= 2025 Eastern Samar local elections =

Local election in the Philippines

- May 12, 2025
- 2025 Eastern Samar gubernatorial election
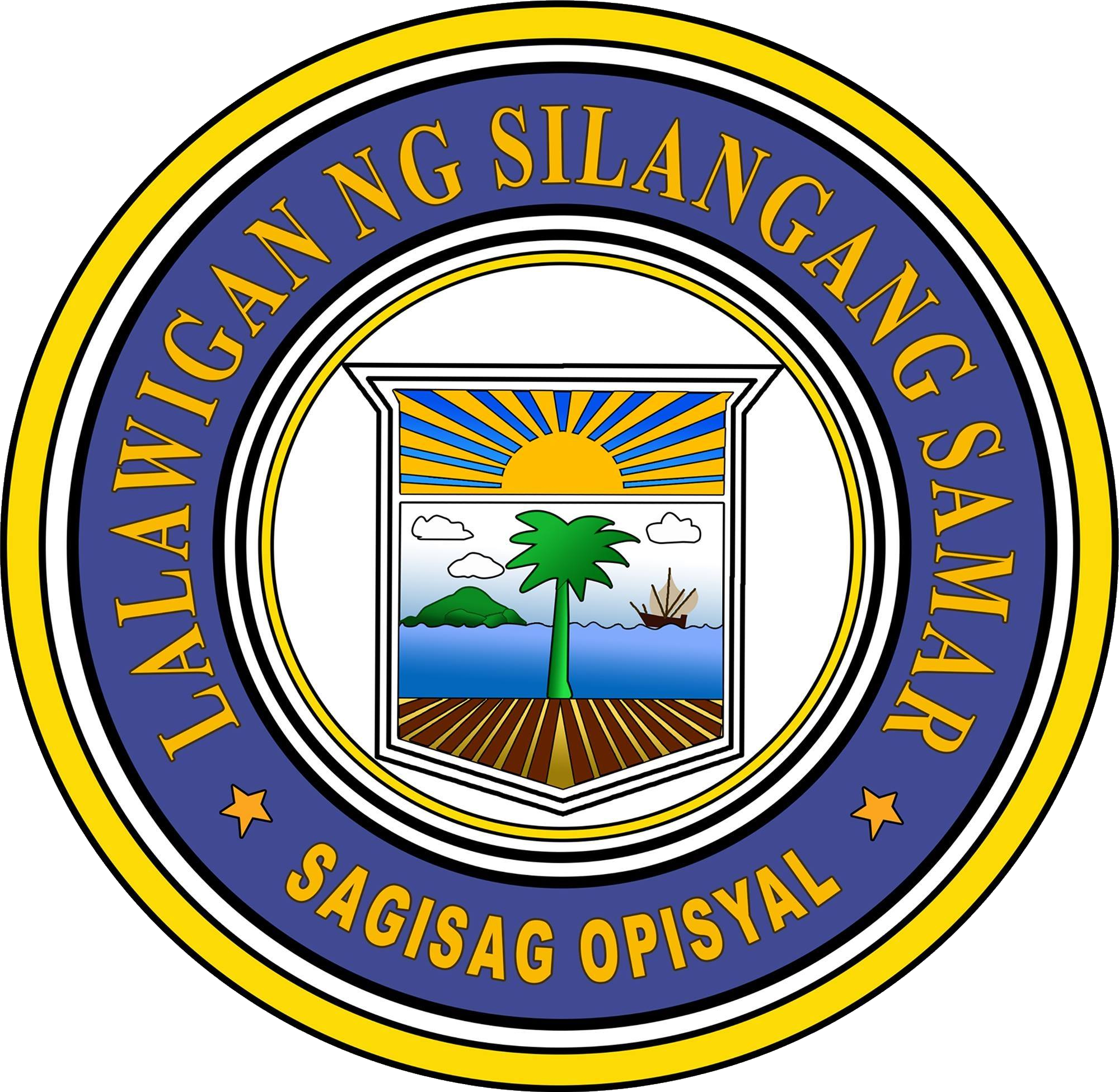
- May 12, 2025
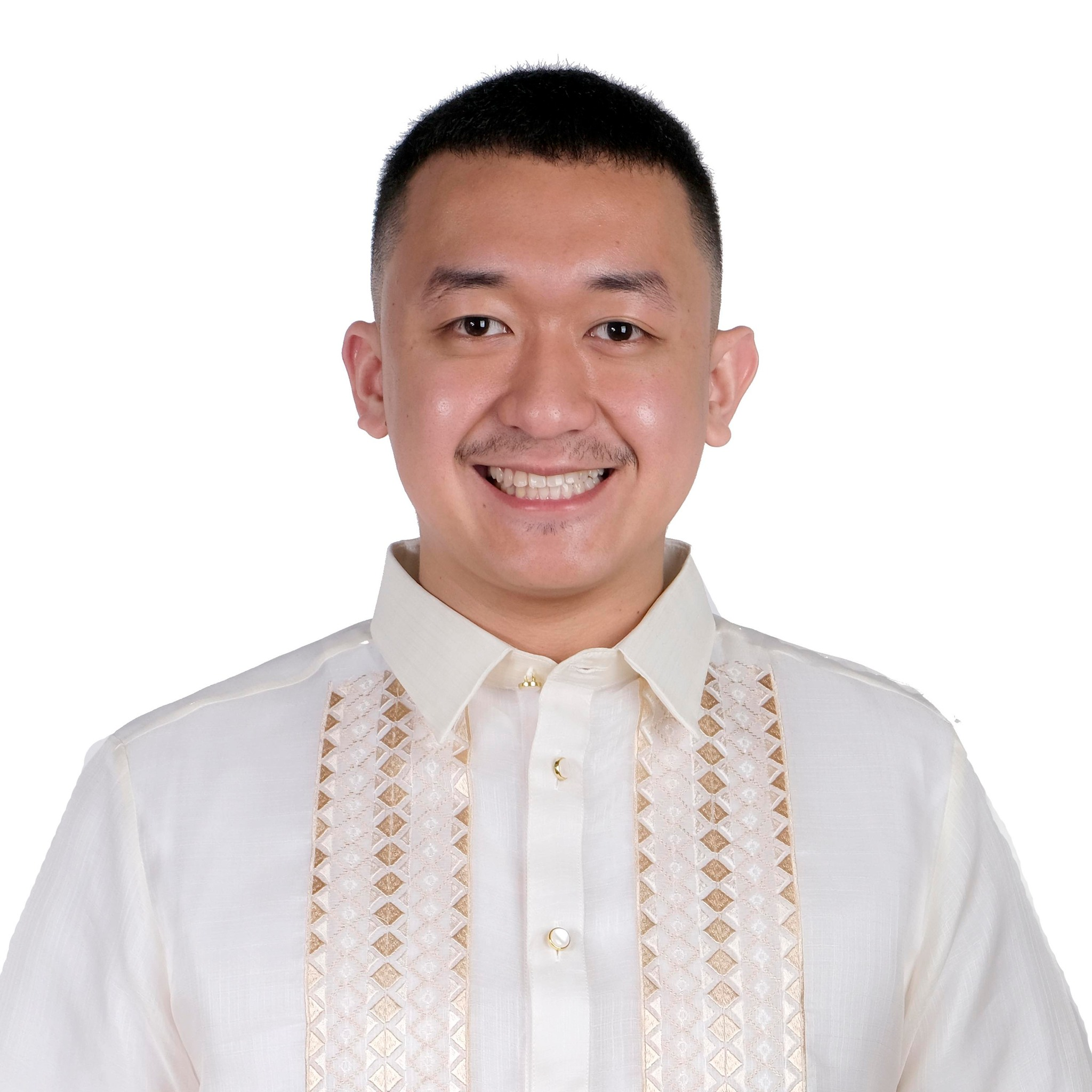

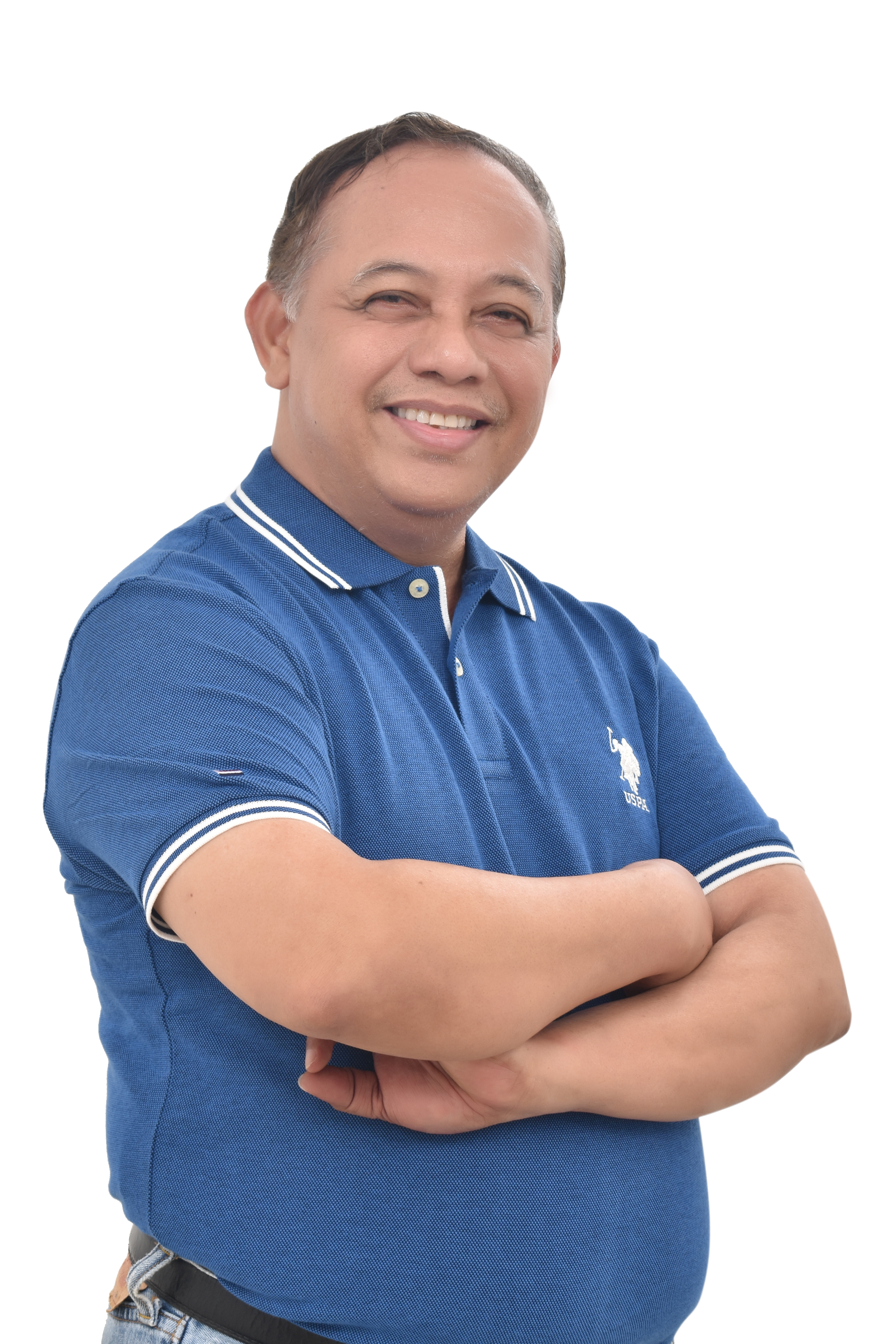
Candidate	RV Evardone	Raffy Asebias
Party	PFP	ABC
Running mate	Maricar Sison	N/A
Popular vote	204,165	77,178
Percentage	72.61	27.39
Governor before election
Ben Evardone
PFP
Elected Governor
RV Evardone
PFP
- 2025 Eastern Samar vice gubernatorial election
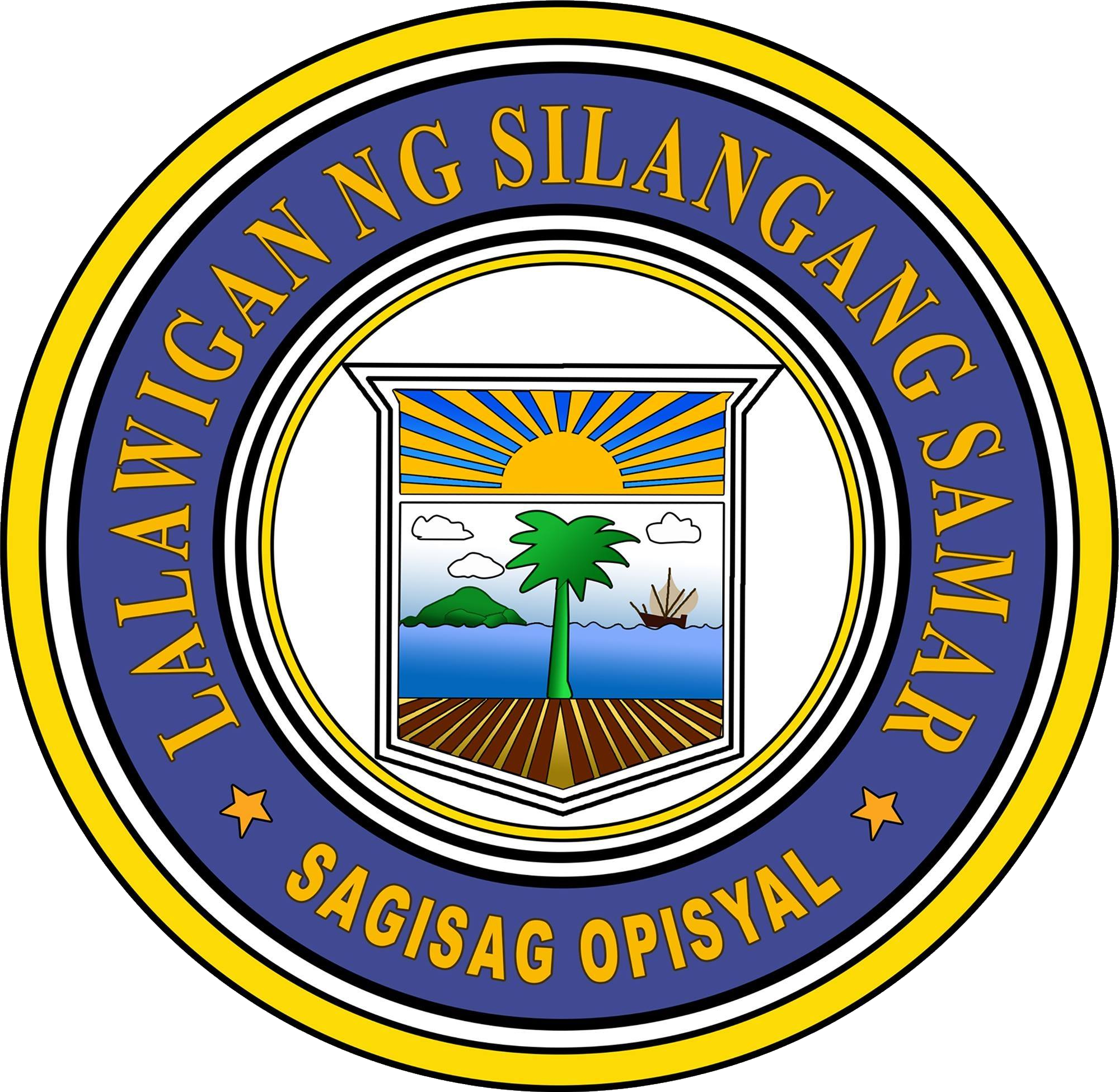
- May 12, 2025
	PFP	IND
Candidate	Maricar Sison	Neil Camenforte
Party	PFP	Independent
Popular vote	166,136	83,697
Percentage	66.55	33.45
Vice Governor before election
Maricar Sison
PFP
Elected Vice Governor
Maricar Sison
PFP

The 2025 Eastern Samar local elections were held on May 12 alongside the 2025 Philippine general election. The gubernatorial, vice-gubernatorial, congressional, Sangguniang Panlalawigan, and all mayoral and vice-mayoral posts were elected. Neither Ben Evardone nor Marcelino Libanan, the original candidates endorsed by Martin Romualdez, ran. Two predominant teams were formed: the Partido Federal ng Pilipinas (PFP) candidates and the Abunda alliance. (Note: Raffy Asebias (Alliance for Barangay Concerns) and Arnold Azura (Independent) ran without teams for governor and congressman, respectively.) RV Evardone was elected governor, Maricar Sison was elected vice governor, and Sheen Gonzales was elected congressman. Notable results included the youngest governor in Eastern Visayas history (Evardone) and the election of all 10 PFP candidates in the Sangguniang Panlalawigan.

== Background and candidates ==
Running as a candidate of the Partido Demokratiko Pilipino (PDP), Ben Evardone defeated Petronilo Abuyen Jr., who ran as a candidate for the Partido Federal ng Pilipinas (PFP), and the independent Bishop Hobayan in the 2022 elections. His running mate Maricar Sison won under PDP against Dindo Picardal of Aksyon Demokratiko, Dado Picardal Jr. of Pederalismo ng Dugong Dakilang Samahan, and Jesse Solidon of PFP. Nine PDP candidates won in the Sangguniang Panlalawigan elections, with the exception of Nestonette Cablao of Aksyon. Maria Fe Abunda won as congresswoman under PDP, beating independent candidate Febida Padel.

On May 1, Evardone switched from PDP-Laban to PFP, the party of President Bongbong Marcos. On August 8, 2024, 58 delegates visited the house of House Speaker Martin Romualdez to ask for their support of Governor Ben Evardone and Congressman Marcelino Libanan's tandem for the upcoming 2025 elections. The delegates included Vice Governor Maricar Goteesan, 13 board members, 19 mayors, and 19 barangay captains. They gave Romualdez a copy of their manifesto to support the duo. Libanan said, "We—Governor Evardone and I—are determined to combine our efforts so that we can improve in a big way the living standards, social conditions, and economic opportunities for individuals and communities in Eastern Samar". Because of this, the duo was named the "Power Duo" by the website Politiko.

On October 1, Libanan withdrew his campaign to support his opposition, Maria Fe Abunda's campaign. On October 8, 19 out of the 23 municipal mayors convinced former Vice Governor Sheen Gonzales to run against incumbent Maria Fe Abunda. Nine days later, Evardone resigned his candidacy to serve as a volunteer for the senatorial team of the PFP, his party. He was replaced by his son, Ralph. Three-term Quinapondan mayor Raffy Asebias decided to run for governor. Neil Camenforte also decided to run against incumbent Vice Governor Maricar Sison.

The PFP fielded Ralph Evardone for governor, Maricar Sison for vice governor, and Sheen Gonzales for congressman. Abunda's alliance consisted of Camenforte for vice governor and her for congresswoman, failing to field a gubernatorial bet. Raffy Asebias ran for governor and Arnold Azura ran for congressman, both without teams.

== Campaign ==
Mock elections were held on January 25 in two select locations in Eastern Samar to simulate the election. The campaign period for congress, provincial, city, and municipal officials started on March 28. Ben Evardone endorsed Kiko Pangilinan for Senator on April 25, posing with the Kiko sign during his visit at the provincial capitol. That same day, two candidates from Eastern Samar, Abunda and councilor candidate Rex Docena, were issued show cause orders, requiring an explanation on vote-buying allegations against them. On April 30, vice mayoral candidate Noel Montallana was told by the Commission on Elections (COMELEC) to explain his remarks in a campaign event on April 23 that may have violated its resolution against discrimination in campaigning. His remarks, according to COMELEC, were "on women and persons with disabilities," adding that "this RV (Evardone) was born at only seven months [...] look at his face in his tarpaulin."

Ballot delivery to Eastern Visayas commenced on May 2. On May 6, an opinion piece released by Charlie V. Manalo of The Manila Times said that the Ombudsman should focus on launching an investigation on Asebias, adding that in one of his rallies, Asebias allegedly said that he did not hesitate to accept money from contractors if the money was given voluntarily. On May 7, an Eastern Visayas unity rally took place for the Alyansa para sa Bagong Pilipinas slate, organized by the Lakas-CMD and Tingog parties. Two Eastern Samar lawmakers, Maria Fe Abunda and Ben Evardone, were invited. On May 10, two days before the election day, the campaign period ended.

== Gubernatorial and vice-gubernatorial results ==
=== Gubernatorial elections ===
Incumbent Quinapondan mayor Raffy Asebias ran against Board Member and Governor Ben Evardone's son RV Evardone.

Candidate	Party	Votes	%
RV Evardone	Partido Federal ng Pilipinas	204,564	72.61
Raffy Asebias	Alliance for Barangay Concerns	77,178	27.39
Total		281,742	100.00
Partido Federal ng Pilipinas hold			
Source: Commission on Elections

=== Vice Gubernatorial elections ===
Incumbent Vice Governor Maricar Sison ran against Neil Camenforte.

Candidate	Party	Votes	%
Maricar Sison (incumbent)	Partido Federal ng Pilipinas	166,525	66.55
Neil Camenforte	Independent	83,702	33.45
Total		250,227	100.00
Partido Federal ng Pilipinas hold			
Source: Commission on Elections

== Congressional results ==
Incumbent Congresswoman Maria Fe Abunda ran against Former Vice Governor Sheen Gonzales and Arnold Azura.

Candidate	Party	Votes	%
Sheen Gonzales	Independent	180,393	61.22
Maria Fe Abunda (incumbent)	Lakas–CMD	108,778	36.92
Arnold Azura	Independent	5,481	1.86
Total		294,652	100.00
Independent gain from Lakas–CMD			
Source: Commission on Elections

== Sangguniang Panlalawigan results ==
Party	Votes	%	Seats	+/–
Partido Federal ng Pilipinas	784,497	79.37	10	+10
Independent	203,904	20.63	0	0
Total	988,401	100.00	10	0
Source: Commission on Elections

=== 1st district ===
Five board members are elected from Eastern Samar's 1st provincial district and eight candidates were included in the ballot.

Candidate	Party	Votes	%
PJ Evardone (incumbent)	Partido Federal ng Pilipinas	119,970	21.97
Byron Suyot (incumbent)	Partido Federal ng Pilipinas	94,792	17.36
Gigi Zacate (incumbent)	Partido Federal ng Pilipinas	87,071	15.94
Jun Quelitano (incumbent)	Partido Federal ng Pilipinas	79,717	14.60
Timmy Campomanes	Partido Federal ng Pilipinas	74,335	13.61
Glenn Escoto	Independent	50,238	9.20
Pascual Robin Jr.	Independent	35,456	6.49
Dionesio Niñora	Independent	4,554	0.83
Total		546,133	100.00
Source: Commission on Elections

=== 2nd district ===
Five board members are elected from Eastern Samar's 2nd provincial district and nine candidates were included in the ballot.

Candidate	Party	Votes	%
Pol Gonzales (incumbent)	Partido Federal ng Pilipinas	72,421	16.37
Christelle Yadao (incumbent)	Partido Federal ng Pilipinas	71,570	16.18
Evet Bandoy-Gaylon (incumbent)	Partido Federal ng Pilipinas	71,092	16.07
Pearl Evardone	Partido Federal ng Pilipinas	60,872	13.76
Nesty Cablao (incumbent)	Partido Federal ng Pilipinas	52,657	11.91
Hayasin Go	Independent	40,516	9.16
Jenny Baldono	Independent	35,467	8.02
Betty Lopez-Reyes	Independent	31,933	7.22
Jessie Guab	Independent	5,740	1.30
Total		442,268	100.00
Source: Commission on Elections

== City and municipal results ==
=== Arteche ===
Arteche mayoral election
Party	Candidate	Votes	%
PFP	Susan Evardone	7,309	60.11
Independent	Inday Mejica	3,022	24.85
Total votes		10,331	84.96
PFP gain from Independent			

Arteche vice mayoral election
Party	Candidate	Votes	%
PFP	Bowad Evardone	7,366	60.58
Independent	Melody Lucido	2,814	23.14
Total votes		10,180	83.72
PFP gain from Independent			

=== Balangiga ===
Balangiga mayoral election
Party	Candidate	Votes	%
PFP	Dana de Lira	5,754	53.36
ABC	Randy Graza	3,223	29.89
Total votes		8,977	83.25
PFP gain from ABC			

Balangiga vice mayoral election
Party	Candidate	Votes	%
Lakas	Arnel Calisay	5,091	47.21
ABC	Nestor Alvarina	3,743	34.71
Total votes		8,834	81.92
Lakas hold			

=== Balangkayan ===
Balangkayan mayoral election
Party	Candidate	Votes	%
PFP	Allan Contado	4,271	53.90
Independent	Jerry Yadao	2,488	31.40
Total votes		6,759	85.30
Lakas hold			

Balangkayan vice mayoral election
Party	Candidate	Votes	%
Lakas	Anne Contado Basco	3,996	50.43
Independent	Charles Culo	2,639	33.30
Total votes		6,635	83.73
Lakas hold			

=== Borongan City ===
Borongan City mayoral election
Party	Candidate	Votes	%
PFP	Dayan Agda	23,249	44.66
Independent	Dindo Picardal	20,475	39.33
Total votes		43,724	83.99
PFP gain from Independent			

Borongan City vice mayoral election
Party	Candidate	Votes	%
Lakas	Emmanuel Tiu Sonco	26,277	50.47
NPC	Kuya Vic Ohoy Franco	16,957	32.57
Total votes		43,234	83.04
Lakas gain from NPC			

=== Can-avid ===
Can-avid mayoral election
Party	Candidate	Votes	%
PFP	Alicia Teves	9,898	57.66
Independent	Gil Allan Germino	4,614	26.88
Independent	Onofre Cesista Sr.	222	1.29
Total votes		14,734	85.83
PFP gain from Independent			

Can-avid vice mayoral election
Party	Candidate	Votes	%
PFP	Modoy Busa	8,284	48.26
Independent	Vilma Germino	5,993	34.91
Total votes		14,227	83.17
PFP gain from Independent			

=== Dolores ===
Dolores mayoral election
Party	Candidate	Votes	%
PFP	Zaldy Carpeso	14,409	44.47
Independent	Lowe Oraya	5,496	16.96
Independent	Delia Benitez	2,472	7.63
Independent	Onoy Rivera	1,853	5.72
Independent	Zaldy Zosa	755	2.33
Independent	Dodoy Tapon	284	0.88
Independent	Neneng Quitorio	153	0.47
Total votes		25,422	78.46
PFP gain from Independent			

Dolores vice mayoral election
Party	Candidate	Votes	%
PFP	Niño Carpeso	12,410	38.30
Independent	Mamay Pomida	10,087	31.13
Independent	Abo Anabo	1,732	5.35
Independent	Fraila Rivera	475	1.47
Total votes		24,704	76.25
PFP gain from Independent			

=== General MacArthur ===
General MacArthur mayoral election
Party	Candidate	Votes	%
PFP	Joel Baldo	4,883	45.61
Independent	Raul Alday	4,144	38.71
Total votes		8,997	84.32
PFP gain from Independent			

General MacArthur vice mayoral election
Party	Candidate	Votes	%
PFP	Buddy Natividad	4,420	41.29
Independent	Luz Japzon	4,247	39.67
Total votes		8,667	80.96
PFP gain from Independent			

=== Giporlos ===
Giporlos mayoral election
Party	Candidate	Votes	%
PFP	Gilbert Go	5,705	53.67
Independent	Iñigo Balagsay	2,981	28.04
Total votes		8,686	81.71
PFP gain from Independent			

Giporlos vice mayoral election
Party	Candidate	Votes	%
PFP	Christopher Go	5,539	52.11
Independent	Roberto Fabilliar	2,975	27.99
Total votes		8,514	80.10
PFP gain from Independent			

=== Guiuan ===
Guiuan mayoral election
Party	Candidate	Votes	%
Nacionalista	Annaliza Kwan	20,686	56.88
Independent	Jearim Tumanda	9,934	27.32
Total votes		30,620	84.20
Nacionalista hold			

Guiuan vice mayoral election
Party	Candidate	Votes	%
Nacionalista	Veronica Cabacaba-Ramirez	25,384	69.80
Independent	Florian Perez	3,860	10.61
Total votes		29,244	80.41
Nacionalista gain from Independent			

=== Hernani ===
Hernani mayoral election
Party	Candidate	Votes	%
Lakas	Amado Candido	3,092	43.88
Independent	Edgar Boco	2,858	40.56
Total votes		5,950	84.44
Lakas gain from Independent			

Hernani vice mayoral election
Party	Candidate	Votes	%
Independent	Socorro Ponferrada	4,277	60.69
Independent	Estela Campo	1,129	16.02
Total votes		5,406	76.71
Independent hold			

=== Jipapad ===
Jipapad mayoral election
Party	Candidate	Votes	%
PFP	Benjamin Ver	3,872	51.19
Independent	Doydoy Monleon	2,777	36.71
Total votes		6,649	87.90
PFP gain from Independent			

Jipapad vice mayoral election
Party	Candidate	Votes	%
PFP	Oscar Amigo	3,847	50.86
Independent	Nonong Montallana	2,696	35.64
Total votes		6,543	86.50
PFP gain from Independent			

=== Lawaan ===
Lawaan mayoral election
Party	Candidate	Votes	%
Lakas	Athene Mendros	6,921	65.46
ABC	Sofronio Ecaldre	2,003	18.94
Total votes		8,924	84.40
Lakas hold			

Lawaan vice mayoral election
Party	Candidate	Votes	%
PFP	Ravi Parker Inciso	6,574	62.18
ABC	Rolando Gacho	1,945	18.40
Total votes		8,519	80.58
PFP gain from ABC			

=== Llorente ===
Llorente mayoral election
Party	Candidate	Votes	%
PFP	Christine Condrada	6,599	45.77
Independent	Tany Hugo	5,866	40.68
Total votes		12,465	86.45
PFP gain from Independent			

Llorente vice mayoral election
Party	Candidate	Votes	%
PFP	Jonnie Condrada	6,609	45.84
Independent	Alan Tan	5,657	39.23
Total votes		12,266	85.07
PFP gain from Independent			

=== Maslog ===
Maslog mayoral election
Party	Candidate	Votes	%
PFP	Septemio Bok Santiago	2,615	71.27
Total votes		2,615	71.27
PFP hold			

Maslog vice mayoral election
Party	Candidate	Votes	%
PFP	Zacarias Santiago	2,532	69.01
Total votes		2,532	69.01
PFP hold			

=== Maydolong ===
Maydolong mayoral election
Party	Candidate	Votes	%
Independent	Louie Borja	5,289	45.33
PFP	Tess Garado	4,886	41.87
Total votes		10,175	87.20
Independent gain from PFP			

Maydolong vice mayoral election
Party	Candidate	Votes	%
Independent	Mimi Garfin	5,057	43.34
PFP	Tantan Guasis	4,991	42.77
Total votes		10,048	86.11
Independent gain from PFP			

=== Mercedes ===
Mercedes mayoral election
Party	Candidate	Votes	%
Lakas	Edwin Quimales	2,882	45.77
Aksyon	Clint Idahosa	2,576	40.91
Total votes		5,458	86.68
Lakas gain from Aksyon			

Mercedes vice mayoral election
Party	Candidate	Votes	%
Aksyon	Aurolino Cabos	2,656	42.18
Lakas	Jose Talagtag	2,588	41.10
Total votes		5,244	83.28
Aksyon gain from Lakas			

=== Oras ===
Oras mayoral election
Party	Candidate	Votes	%
Lakas	Oramismo Ador	13,052	44.98
PFP	Viviane Alvarez	10,904	37.58
Total votes		23,956	82.56
Lakas gain from PFP			

Oras vice mayoral election
Party	Candidate	Votes	%
Lakas	Adolfo Mugas	12,270	42.29
Aksyon	Aldwin Picardal	11,004	37.92
Total votes		23,274	80.21
Lakas gain from Aksyon			

=== Quinapondan ===
Quinapondan mayoral election
Party	Candidate	Votes	%
PFP	Leo Jasper Candido	5,032	46.13
Independent	Nedie Campo	3,905	35.80
Independent	Danny Natividad	72	0.66
Total votes		9,009	82.59
PFP gain from Independent			

Quinapondan vice mayoral election
Party	Candidate	Votes	%
Independent	Norma Quinto	3,307	30.32
Independent	Junrey Germones	2,785	25.53
PFP	Marlit Terencio	2,733	25.06
Total votes		8,825	80.91
Independent gain from PFP			

=== Salcedo ===
Salcedo mayoral election
Party	Candidate	Votes	%
PFP	Melchor Mergal	7,330	42.49
Independent	King Padit	6,272	36.35
Total votes		13,602	78.84
PFP gain from Independent			

Salcedo vice mayoral election
Party	Candidate	Votes	%
Independent	Atty. May Machica	6,712	38.90
PFP	Baye Badanoy	6,514	37.76
Total votes		13,226	76.66
Independent gain from PFP			

=== San Julian ===
San Julian mayoral election
Party	Candidate	Votes	%
Lakas	Ate Dorie Estaron	4,201	38.71
Independent	Eric Aseo	3,754	34.59
Independent	Allan Doligon	839	7.73
PFP	Yurito Acol	380	3.50
Total votes		9,174	84.53
Lakas gain from Independent			

San Julian vice mayoral election
Party	Candidate	Votes	%
Lakas	Dennis Estaron	4,726	43.55
PFP	Joeme Erroba	4,100	37.78
Total votes		8,826	81.33
Lakas gain from PFP			

=== San Policarpo ===
San Policarpo mayoral election
Party	Candidate	Votes	%
PFP	Menlo Nicart	6,798	52.73
Independent	Marcel Lim	4,419	34.28
Total votes		11,217	87.01
PFP gain from Independent			

San Policarpo vice mayoral election
Party	Candidate	Votes	%
PFP	Manang Nicart	6,877	53.34
Independent	Noy-noy Bianes	4,121	31.97
Total votes		11,217	85.31
PFP gain from Independent			

=== Sulat ===
Sulat mayoral election
Party	Candidate	Votes	%
PFP	Javier Zacate	8,683	71.10
Independent	Amado Amigo	1,162	9.51
Total votes		9,845	80.61
PFP gain from Independent			

Sulat vice mayoral election
Party	Candidate	Votes	%
PFP	Dondon Evardone	8,796	72.02
Total votes		8,796	72.02
PFP hold			

=== Taft ===
Taft mayoral election
Party	Candidate	Votes	%
PFP	Amagina Ty	8,341	55.60
Independent	Maricon Adalim-Hilario	4,084	27.22
Independent	Corazon Balmes	218	1.45
Total votes		12,643	84.27
PFP gain from Independent			

Taft vice mayoral election
Party	Candidate	Votes	%
PFP	Lala Dongallo	7,781	51.87
Independent	Badoy Araya	4,571	30.47
Total votes		12,352	82.34
PFP gain from Independent			

== Aftermath ==
Ralph Evardone won the gubernatorial race, becoming the youngest governor in Eastern Visayas history at the age of 25. Evardone vowed to focus on agricultural modernization as a vital sector in Eastern Samar. In a farewell speech during Ralph's inauguration, Ben Evardone thanked the citizens of Eastern Samar for supporting him and his 21-year political career. Sheen Gonzales unseated former congresswoman Maria Fe Abunda, who was seeking a third term, from her seat in Congress. His victory was supported by most local incumbent mayors. In a Facebook post, Abunda thanked her supporters, adding, "It may not be the results we wanted, but our service continues." In his tenure, Evardone tackled the inconsistent power supply in the province through fast-tracking a Renewable Energy Code. He also made numerous changes related to agriculture, such as utilizing mechanization for farmers, crop diversification initiatives, and the creation of value-added facilities. During Sheen Gonzales' first few months as congressman, he aimed to bridge education gaps in remote areas and called for a congressional probe on mining in Homonhon.

== See also ==
- 2025 Philippine House of Representatives elections in Eastern Visayas
- 2025 Philippine local elections in Eastern Visayas
