= 2010 Eastern Visayas local elections =

Local elections were held in Eastern Visayas on May 10, 2010, as part of the 2010 Philippine general election.

== Biliran ==
=== Governor ===
Term-limited incumbent Governor Rogelio Espina of the Nacionalista Party ran for the House of Representatives in Biliran's lone district. Espina's brother, former representative Gerardo Espina Jr., won the election as an independent.

Candidate	Party	Votes	%
Gerardo Espina Jr.	Independent	32,211	42.35
Charles Chong	Lakas–Kampi–CMD	31,106	40.90
Ralph Pastor Salazar	Liberal Party	7,005	9.21
Carlos Chan	Independent	5,256	6.91
Edgardo Ambe	Independent	480	0.63
Total		76,058	100.00
Valid votes		76,058	92.61
Invalid/blank votes		6,069	7.39
Total votes		82,127	100.00
Independent gain from Nacionalista Party			
Source: Commission on Elections

=== Vice Governor ===
Incumbent Vice Governor Lucila Curso of the Nacionalista Party ran for re-election to a second term, but was defeated by Manuel Montejo Jr. of Lakas–Kampi–CMD.

Candidate	Party	Votes	%
Manuel Montejo Jr.	Lakas–Kampi–CMD	27,337	39.37
Lucila Curso	Nacionalista Party	26,779	38.57
Victor del Rosario	Nationalist People's Coalition	7,078	10.19
Jose Gonzales	Liberal Party	6,610	9.52
Pablo Mejia III	Independent	1,633	2.35
Total		69,437	100.00
Valid votes		69,437	84.55
Invalid/blank votes		12,690	15.45
Total votes		82,127	100.00
Lakas–Kampi–CMD gain from Nacionalista Party			
Source: Commission on Elections

=== Provincial Board ===
The Biliran Provincial Board is composed of 11 board members, 8 of whom are elected.

Party	Votes	%	Seats
Nacionalista Party	114,629	49.84	5
Lakas–Kampi–CMD	87,765	38.16	2
Liberal Party	7,801	3.39	0
Independent	19,781	8.60	1
Total	229,976	100.00	8
Total votes	82,127	–	
Source: Commission on Elections

==== 1st district ====
Candidate	Party	Votes	%
Brigido Caneja III	Nacionalista Party	18,074	14.40
Bebiano Jadulco	Lakas–Kampi–CMD	17,754	14.14
Martin Lagat	Lakas–Kampi–CMD	17,389	13.85
Eden Apolinar	Nacionalista Party	16,656	13.27
Jose Genson	Lakas–Kampi–CMD	15,623	12.44
Elizar Sabitsana	Nacionalista Party	15,062	12.00
Teofanes Pacioles	Lakas–Kampi–CMD	12,655	10.08
Tiburcio Morales Jr.	Nacionalista Party	9,620	7.66
Alexander Salas	Independent	2,206	1.76
Ernesto Terado	Independent	511	0.41
Total		125,550	100.00
Total votes		42,303	–
Source: Commission on Elections

==== 2nd district ====
Candidate	Party	Votes	%
Lorenzo Reveldez Jr.	Nacionalista Party	15,845	15.17
Gina Maria Enage	Nacionalista Party	15,115	14.47
Eriberto Tubis Jr.	Nacionalista Party	13,558	12.98
Dominador Corpin	Independent	11,251	10.77
Rolando Sabornido	Nacionalista Party	10,699	10.25
Oscar Banquilay Jr.	Lakas–Kampi–CMD	8,484	8.12
Victor Garcia	Lakas–Kampi–CMD	8,412	8.06
Clarita Napoles	Lakas–Kampi–CMD	7,448	7.13
Philip Veneracion	Liberal Party	7,328	7.02
Guido Raagas	Independent	5,813	5.57
Nicanor Datuin	Liberal Party	473	0.45
Total		104,426	100.00
Total votes		39,824	–
Source: Commission on Elections

== Eastern Samar ==
=== Governor ===
Incumbent Governor Ben Evardone ran for the House of Representatives in Eastern Samar's lone district as an independent. San Policarpo mayor Conrado Nicart Jr. of the Nacionalista Party won the election.

Candidate	Party	Votes	%
Conrado Nicart Jr.	Nacionalista Party	48,186	26.14
Generoso Yu	Lakas–Kampi–CMD	42,121	22.85
Efren Docena	Liberal Party	31,755	17.23
Allan Contado	Nationalist People's Coalition	23,602	12.81
Leander Geli	Pwersa ng Masang Pilipino	21,838	11.85
Jose Ramirez	Lapiang Manggagawa	16,024	8.69
Joanes Alfredo Hobayan	Philippine Green Republican Party	792	0.43
Total		184,318	100.00
Valid votes		184,318	86.24
Invalid/blank votes		29,421	13.76
Total votes		213,739	100.00
Nacionalista Party gain from Independent			
Source: Commission on Elections

=== Vice Governor ===
Incumbent Vice Governor Leander Geli of Pwersa ng Masang Pilipino ran for Governor of Eastern Samar. Sheen Gonzales of Lakas–Kampi–CMD won the election.

Candidate	Party	Votes	%
Sheen Gonzales	Lakas–Kampi–CMD	110,631	66.80
Jose Vicente Opinion	Partido Demokratiko Sosyalista ng Pilipinas	46,137	27.86
Camilo Camenforte	Independent	8,847	5.34
Total		165,615	100.00
Valid votes		165,615	77.48
Invalid/blank votes		48,124	22.52
Total votes		213,739	100.00
Lakas–Kampi–CMD gain from Pwersa ng Masang Pilipino			
Source: Commission on Elections

=== Provincial Board ===
The Eastern Samar Provincial Board is composed of 13 board members, 10 of whom are elected.

Party	Votes	%	Seats
Lakas–Kampi–CMD	337,786	51.21	7
Nacionalista Party	190,667	28.90	2
Partido Demokratiko Sosyalista ng Pilipinas	49,800	7.55	1
Liberal Party	37,839	5.74	0
Nationalist People's Coalition	18,839	2.86	0
Aksyon Demokratiko	4,643	0.70	0
Laban ng Demokratikong Pilipino	2,607	0.40	0
Independent	17,461	2.65	0
Total	659,642	100.00	10
Total votes	213,739	–	
Source: Commission on Elections

==== 1st district ====
Candidate	Party	Votes	%
Joji Montallana	Lakas–Kampi–CMD	42,148	11.73
Floro Balato Sr.	Nacionalista Party	41,606	11.58
Aldwin Aklao	Lakas–Kampi–CMD	40,082	11.15
Celestino Cabato	Nacionalista Party	34,564	9.62
Byron Suyot	Lakas–Kampi–CMD	29,766	8.28
Edita Sepulveda	Lakas–Kampi–CMD	29,530	8.22
Peregerio Balase	Nacionalista Party	27,096	7.54
Christopher Moscare	Nacionalista Party	23,772	6.61
Victor Franco	Nacionalista Party	22,877	6.37
Celerino Johan Bagro Jr.	Lakas–Kampi–CMD	22,043	6.13
Pergentino Deri-on Jr.	Independent	17,461	4.86
Dionisio Libanan	Nationalist People's Coalition	11,958	3.33
Jose Chicano Jr.	Liberal Party	11,868	3.30
Carlito Cabo	Aksyon Demokratiko	4,643	1.29
Total		359,414	100.00
Total votes		117,943	–
Source: Commission on Elections

==== 2nd district ====
Candidate	Party	Votes	%
Gorgonio Cabacaba	Lakas–Kampi–CMD	44,333	14.77
Enerio Sabulao	Lakas–Kampi–CMD	41,039	13.67
Jonas Abuda	Lakas–Kampi–CMD	39,090	13.02
Jenny Baldono	Partido Demokratiko Sosyalista ng Pilipinas	31,869	10.61
Beatriz Reyes	Lakas–Kampi–CMD	31,424	10.47
Susan Sumook	Liberal Party	25,971	8.65
Reynaldo Padit Sr.	Nacionalista Party	22,099	7.36
Clotilde Salazar	Nacionalista Party	18,653	6.21
Ernesto Hilvano	Lakas–Kampi–CMD	18,331	6.11
Fe Cabel	Partido Demokratiko Sosyalista ng Pilipinas	17,931	5.97
Jose Vallejos	Nationalist People's Coalition	6,881	2.29
Facundo Dee Jr.	Laban ng Demokratikong Pilipino	2,607	0.87
Total		300,228	100.00
Total votes		95,796	–
Source: Commission on Elections

== Leyte ==
=== Governor ===
Incumbent Governor Jericho Petilla of Lakas–Kampi–CMD won re-election to a third term.

Candidate	Party	Votes	%
Jericho Petilla	Lakas–Kampi–CMD	445,104	100.00
Total		445,104	100.00
Valid votes		445,104	66.20
Invalid/blank votes		227,281	33.80
Total votes		672,385	100.00
Lakas–Kampi–CMD hold			
Source: Commission on Elections

=== Vice Governor ===
Incumbent Vice Governor Maria Mimietta Bagulaya of the Liberal Party won re-election to a third term.

Candidate	Party	Votes	%
Maria Mimietta Bagulaya	Liberal Party	363,593	100.00
Total		363,593	100.00
Valid votes		363,593	54.08
Invalid/blank votes		308,792	45.92
Total votes		672,385	100.00
Liberal Party hold			
Source: Commission on Elections

=== Provincial Board ===
The Leyte Provincial Board is composed of 13 board members, 10 of whom are elected.

Party	Votes	%	Seats
Lakas–Kampi–CMD	529,687	68.20	9
Liberal Party	97,078	12.50	1
Partido Demokratiko Sosyalista ng Pilipinas	62,173	8.01	0
Pwersa ng Masang Pilipino	27,903	3.59	0
Nationalist People's Coalition	19,906	2.56	0
Nacionalista Party	13,352	1.72	0
Independent	26,557	3.42	0
Total	776,656	100.00	10
Total votes	672,385	–	
Source: Commission on Elections

==== 1st district ====
Candidate	Party	Votes	%
Roque Tiu	Liberal Party	47,924	33.27
Ma. Lourdes Go-Soco	Lakas–Kampi–CMD	32,944	22.87
Proto Brazil Jr.	Nationalist People's Coalition	19,906	13.82
Venancio Bañez Jr.	Lakas–Kampi–CMD	16,702	11.60
Renato Yu	Independent	13,688	9.50
Edwin Jomadiao	Independent	12,869	8.93
Total		144,033	100.00
Total votes		113,072	–
Source: Commission on Elections

==== 2nd district ====
Candidate	Party	Votes	%
Anlie Apostol	Lakas–Kampi–CMD	84,027	46.14
Niccolo Villasin	Lakas–Kampi–CMD	53,033	29.12
Simeon Ongbit Jr.	Partido Demokratiko Sosyalista ng Pilipinas	36,971	20.30
Joaquin Ashley de la Cruz	Pwersa ng Masang Pilipino	8,078	4.44
Total		182,109	100.00
Total votes		181,665	–
Source: Commission on Elections

==== 3rd district ====
Candidate	Party	Votes	%
Bernard Remandaban	Lakas–Kampi–CMD	39,497	31.77
Rolando Piamonte	Lakas–Kampi–CMD	26,452	21.28
Andres Nautilus Salvacion	Partido Demokratiko Sosyalista ng Pilipinas	25,202	20.27
Romulo Ocubillo	Pwersa ng Masang Pilipino	18,223	14.66
Arcadio Lelis	Nacionalista Party	13,352	10.74
Pedro Pates Jr.	Pwersa ng Masang Pilipino	1,602	1.29
Total		124,328	100.00
Total votes		87,451	–
Source: Commission on Elections

==== 4th district ====
Candidate	Party	Votes	%
Deborah Bertulfo	Lakas–Kampi–CMD	56,578	38.22
Antonio Jabilles	Lakas–Kampi–CMD	42,303	28.58
Mario Larrazabal	Liberal Party	30,433	20.56
Juanito Reyes	Liberal Party	18,721	12.65
Total		148,035	100.00
Total votes		116,965	–
Source: Commission on Elections

==== 5th district ====
Candidate	Party	Votes	%
Florante Cayunda Jr.	Lakas–Kampi–CMD	91,894	51.58
Carlo Loreto	Lakas–Kampi–CMD	86,257	48.42
Total		178,151	100.00
Total votes		173,232	–
Source: Commission on Elections

== Northern Samar ==
=== Governor ===
Term-limited incumbent Governor Raul Daza of the Liberal Party ran for the House of Representatives in Northern Samar's 1st district. The Liberal Party nominated Daza's son, representative Paul Daza, who won the election.

Candidate	Party	Votes	%
Paul Daza	Liberal Party	138,287	57.63
Harlin Abayon	Lakas–Kampi–CMD	100,214	41.77
Cesar Liguidliguid	Independent	850	0.35
Wenceslao Pancho Jr.	Independent	589	0.25
Total		239,940	100.00
Valid votes		239,940	88.50
Invalid/blank votes		31,180	11.50
Total votes		271,120	100.00
Liberal Party hold			
Source: Commission on Elections

=== Vice Governor ===
Incumbent Vice Governor Antonio Lucero of the Liberal Party ran for the House of Representatives in Northern Samar's 2nd district. The Liberal Party nominated Galahad Vicencio, who was defeated by Ramp Nielsen Uy of the Nacionalista Party.

Candidate	Party	Votes	%
Ramp Nielsen Uy	Nacionalista Party	110,520	50.42
Galahad Vicencio	Liberal Party	108,672	49.58
Total		219,192	100.00
Valid votes		219,192	80.85
Invalid/blank votes		51,928	19.15
Total votes		271,120	100.00
Nacionalista Party gain from Liberal Party			
Source: Commission on Elections

=== Provincial Board ===
The Northern Samar Provincial Board is composed of 13 board members, 10 of whom are elected.

Party	Votes	%	Seats
Liberal Party	430,437	54.95	8
Lakas–Kampi–CMD	258,935	33.06	2
Nacionalista Party	69,904	8.92	0
Pwersa ng Masang Pilipino	16,118	2.06	0
Independent	7,899	1.01	0
Total	783,293	100.00	10
Total votes	271,120	–	
Source: Commission on Elections

==== 1st district ====
Candidate	Party	Votes	%
Jose Layon	Liberal Party	64,588	14.38
Teodoro Jumamil	Liberal Party	54,214	12.07
Lazaro Ballesta	Liberal Party	53,881	11.99
Beda Bogtong	Liberal Party	43,614	9.71
Alberto Mendador	Liberal Party	43,404	9.66
Gary Lavin	Nacionalista Party	42,887	9.55
Teresita del Valle	Lakas–Kampi–CMD	39,970	8.90
Victorio Singzon II	Lakas–Kampi–CMD	34,608	7.70
Virgilio Villadolid	Lakas–Kampi–CMD	31,715	7.06
Merlo Tan	Nacionalista Party	27,017	6.01
Edgardo Alcera	Pwersa ng Masang Pilipino	7,221	1.61
Bernardo Portes III	Pwersa ng Masang Pilipino	6,157	1.37
Total		449,276	100.00
Total votes		147,200	–
Source: Commission on Elections

==== 2nd district ====
Candidate	Party	Votes	%
Albert Lucero	Liberal Party	39,961	11.96
Marites Gillamac	Lakas–Kampi–CMD	39,474	11.82
Ricardo Daiz	Liberal Party	37,849	11.33
Dionisio Dexter Galit	Lakas–Kampi–CMD	33,105	9.91
Eustaquio Lagrimas	Liberal Party	32,554	9.75
Remus Dulay	Liberal Party	31,019	9.29
Reyzandro Unay	Liberal Party	29,353	8.79
Cleto Pinca	Lakas–Kampi–CMD	27,761	8.31
Miguel Sarmiento	Lakas–Kampi–CMD	26,721	8.00
Joselito Celajes	Lakas–Kampi–CMD	25,581	7.66
Michael Espina	Independent	7,899	2.36
Esteban Sosing	Pwersa ng Masang Pilipino	2,740	0.82
Total		334,017	100.00
Total votes		123,920	–
Source: Commission on Elections

== Ormoc ==
=== Mayor ===
Incumbent Mayor Eric Codilla of Lakas–Kampi–CMD won re-election to a third term.

Candidate	Party	Votes	%
Eric Codilla	Lakas–Kampi–CMD	37,661	55.66
Marcos Larrazabal	Liberal Party	29,335	43.35
Antonio Domino	Independent	588	0.87
Amilo Yoo	Independent	82	0.12
Total		67,666	100.00
Valid votes		67,666	93.10
Invalid/blank votes		5,013	6.90
Total votes		72,679	100.00
Lakas–Kampi–CMD hold			
Source: Commission on Elections

=== Vice Mayor ===
Incumbent Vice Mayor Nepomuceno Aparis of Lakas–Kampi–CMD won re-election to a third term.

Candidate	Party	Votes	%
Nepomuceno Aparis	Lakas–Kampi–CMD	35,680	57.41
Jose Conejos	Liberal Party	26,473	42.59
Total		62,153	100.00
Valid votes		62,153	85.52
Invalid/blank votes		10,526	14.48
Total votes		72,679	100.00
Lakas–Kampi–CMD hold			
Source: Commission on Elections

=== City Council ===
The Ormoc City Council is composed of 12 councilors, 10 of whom are elected.

Party	Votes	%	Seats
Lakas–Kampi–CMD	214,978	43.65	8
Liberal Party	129,348	26.27	1
Independent	148,133	30.08	1
Total	492,459	100.00	10
Total votes	72,679	–	
Source: Commission on Elections

Candidate	Party	Votes	%
Ruben Capahi	Lakas–Kampi–CMD	27,068	5.50
Rolando Villasencio	Liberal Party	24,895	5.06
Claudio Larrazabal	Lakas–Kampi–CMD	23,985	4.87
Mario Rodriguez	Independent	23,193	4.71
Lea Doris Villar	Lakas–Kampi–CMD	22,099	4.49
Filomeno Maglasang	Lakas–Kampi–CMD	22,068	4.48
Jose Alfaro Jr.	Lakas–Kampi–CMD	21,780	4.42
Sotero Pepito	Lakas–Kampi–CMD	21,264	4.32
Demosthenes Togonon	Lakas–Kampi–CMD	20,934	4.25
Rafael Omega Jr.	Lakas–Kampi–CMD	19,712	4.00
Paulito Cotiangco	Liberal Party	19,039	3.87
Fernando Parrilla	Lakas–Kampi–CMD	18,958	3.85
Eusebio Gerardo Penserga	Liberal Party	18,757	3.81
Erlinda Sakai	Liberal Party	18,191	3.69
Ernesto Rojas	Liberal Party	17,738	3.60
Maria Samuel Aviles	Independent	17,158	3.48
Agapito Pongos	Lakas–Kampi–CMD	17,110	3.47
Benjamin Pongos Jr.	Independent	16,714	3.39
Casmer Ampaso	Independent	16,367	3.32
Raquel Kaluza	Liberal Party	15,735	3.20
Roy Pangilinan	Independent	15,363	3.12
James Howard Domino	Liberal Party	14,993	3.04
Edgar de Loyola	Independent	14,973	3.04
Peter Rodney Lladoc	Independent	11,983	2.43
Joel Brazil	Independent	11,429	2.32
Procopio Gaquit	Independent	8,446	1.72
Emma Fragata	Independent	5,051	1.03
Moises Laurente	Independent	3,183	0.65
Valentin Laurente Jr.	Independent	2,307	0.47
Filemon Abonales	Independent	1,966	0.40
Total		492,459	100.00
Total votes		72,679	–
Source: Commission on Elections

== Samar ==
=== Governor ===
Term-limited incumbent Governor Milagrosa Tan of Lakas–Kampi–CMD ran for the House of Representatives in Samar's 2nd district. Lakas–Kampi–CMD nominated Tan's daughter, representative Sharee Ann Tan, who won the election.

Candidate	Party	Votes	%
Sharee Ann Tan	Lakas–Kampi–CMD	126,430	43.07
Casilda Lim	Partido Demokratiko Sosyalista ng Pilipinas	86,081	29.32
Jesus Redaja	Nationalist People's Coalition	74,881	25.51
Pedro Labid	Bangon Pilipinas	4,437	1.51
Pilar Bolok	Independent	1,735	0.59
Total		293,564	100.00
Valid votes		293,564	84.60
Invalid/blank votes		53,423	15.40
Total votes		346,987	100.00
Lakas–Kampi–CMD hold			
Source: Commission on Elections

=== Vice Governor ===
Incumbent Vice Governor Jesus Redaja of the Nationalist People's Coalition (NPC) ran for Governor of Samar. The NPC nominated former San Jorge mayor Joseph Grey, who was defeated by Stephen James Tan of Lakas–Kampi–CMD.

Candidate	Party	Votes	%
Stephen James Tan	Lakas–Kampi–CMD	120,975	44.86
Rosenaida Rosales	Independent	91,853	34.06
Joseph Grey	Nationalist People's Coalition	56,854	21.08
Total		269,682	100.00
Valid votes		269,682	77.72
Invalid/blank votes		77,305	22.28
Total votes		346,987	100.00
Lakas–Kampi–CMD gain from Nationalist People's Coalition			
Source: Commission on Elections

=== Provincial Board ===
The Samar Provincial Board is composed of 13 board members, 10 of whom are elected.

Party	Votes	%	Seats
Lakas–Kampi–CMD	535,146	54.07	8
Nacionalista Party	193,528	19.55	0
Nationalist People's Coalition	90,095	9.10	0
Partido Demokratiko Sosyalista ng Pilipinas	29,139	2.94	0
Liberal Party	17,568	1.77	0
Bangon Pilipinas	5,245	0.53	0
PDP–Laban	3,611	0.36	0
Independent	115,443	11.66	2
Total	989,775	100.00	10
Total votes	346,987	–	
Source: Commission on Elections

==== 1st district ====
Candidate	Party	Votes	%
Charlito Coñejos	Lakas–Kampi–CMD	77,831	14.50
Noel Sermense	Lakas–Kampi–CMD	66,016	12.30
Renato Uy	Lakas–Kampi–CMD	65,530	12.21
Jasper Sumagang	Lakas–Kampi–CMD	62,699	11.68
Prudencio Dy Jr.	Lakas–Kampi–CMD	59,902	11.16
Beatres White	Nacionalista Party	45,560	8.49
Cesar Sabenecio	Nacionalista Party	42,615	7.94
Jose Precioso Rosales	Nacionalista Party	39,205	7.30
Vicky Rumohr	Nacionalista Party	36,494	6.80
Yanicita Edem	Nacionalista Party	29,654	5.52
Arlene Pallones-Lim	Nationalist People's Coalition	8,297	1.55
Antonio Tiu	Independent	2,962	0.55
Total		536,765	100.00
Total votes		155,475	–
Source: Commission on Elections

==== 2nd district ====
Candidate	Party	Votes	%
Eunice Babalcon	Independent	51,534	11.38
Jimmy Dy	Independent	49,554	10.94
Arthur Vaughn Zosa	Lakas–Kampi–CMD	48,733	10.76
Luzviminda Nacario	Lakas–Kampi–CMD	45,927	10.14
Juan Latorre Jr.	Lakas–Kampi–CMD	43,059	9.51
Beethoven Bermejo	Nationalist People's Coalition	40,462	8.93
Perfecta Sabenecio	Lakas–Kampi–CMD	36,026	7.95
John Erwin Teodoro	Lakas–Kampi–CMD	29,423	6.50
Kenneth Mark Perez	Partido Demokratiko Sosyalista ng Pilipinas	29,139	6.43
Felix Hilvano	Nationalist People's Coalition	18,301	4.04
Pablo Cinco	Liberal Party	17,568	3.88
Dominador Cabanganan	Nationalist People's Coalition	16,442	3.63
Antonieto Lee	Independent	11,393	2.51
Salvador Jakosalem	Nationalist People's Coalition	6,593	1.46
Daniel Hizon	Bangon Pilipinas	5,245	1.16
Fernando Niego Sr.	PDP–Laban	3,611	0.80
Total		453,010	100.00
Total votes		191,512	–
Source: Commission on Elections

== Southern Leyte ==
=== Governor ===
Incumbent Governor Damian Mercado of Lakas–Kampi–CMD won re-election to a second term.

Candidate	Party	Votes	%
Damian Mercado	Lakas–Kampi–CMD	132,696	73.18
Marisa Lerias	Nationalist People's Coalition	47,430	26.16
Jerome Roden	Independent	1,190	0.66
Total		181,316	100.00
Valid votes		181,316	87.78
Invalid/blank votes		25,242	12.22
Total votes		206,558	100.00
Lakas–Kampi–CMD hold			
Source: Commission on Elections

=== Vice Governor ===
Incumbent Vice Governor Miguel Maamo II of Lakas–Kampi–CMD won re-election to a third term.

Candidate	Party	Votes	%
Miguel Maamo II	Lakas–Kampi–CMD	124,899	87.05
Ruel Dumancas	Independent	18,584	12.95
Total		143,483	100.00
Valid votes		143,483	69.46
Invalid/blank votes		63,075	30.54
Total votes		206,558	100.00
Lakas–Kampi–CMD hold			
Source: Commission on Elections

=== Provincial Board ===
The Southern Leyte Provincial Board is composed of 11 board members, 8 of whom are elected.

Party	Votes	%	Seats
Lakas–Kampi–CMD	347,717	74.60	8
Nationalist People's Coalition	92,551	19.86	0
Pwersa ng Masang Pilipino	17,482	3.75	0
Independent	8,330	1.79	0
Total	466,080	100.00	8
Total votes	206,558	–	
Source: Commission on Elections

==== 1st district ====
Candidate	Party	Votes	%
Albert Esclamado	Lakas–Kampi–CMD	50,839	21.14
Cesar Rey	Lakas–Kampi–CMD	42,064	17.49
Felicula Escaño	Lakas–Kampi–CMD	40,611	16.89
Teopisto Rojas Jr.	Lakas–Kampi–CMD	39,604	16.47
Eva Tomol	Nationalist People's Coalition	27,097	11.27
Iñigo Costillas	Nationalist People's Coalition	19,235	8.00
Rito Go	Nationalist People's Coalition	12,699	5.28
Gaspar Tagalo	Independent	8,330	3.46
Total		240,479	100.00
Total votes		95,748	–
Source: Commission on Elections

==== 2nd district ====
Candidate	Party	Votes	%
Roberto Lagumbay	Lakas–Kampi–CMD	46,772	20.73
Daisy Gamale	Lakas–Kampi–CMD	46,343	20.54
Florentino Fernandez	Lakas–Kampi–CMD	43,039	19.08
Abelardo Almario	Lakas–Kampi–CMD	38,445	17.04
Jessie Labao	Nationalist People's Coalition	19,902	8.82
Apolonio Baclayon	Nationalist People's Coalition	13,618	6.04
Santy Santiago	Pwersa ng Masang Pilipino	11,423	5.06
Arnel dela Peña	Pwersa ng Masang Pilipino	6,059	2.69
Total		225,601	100.00
Total votes		110,810	–
Source: Commission on Elections

== Tacloban ==
=== Mayor ===
Incumbent Mayor Alfred Romualdez of Lakas–Kampi–CMD won re-election to a second term against city councilor Ranulfo Abellanosa of the Liberal Party.

=== Vice Mayor ===
Incumbent Vice Mayor Arvin Antoni of the Liberal Party won re-election to a second term against former mayor Alfredo Romualdez of PDP–Laban.

=== City Council ===
The Tacloban City Council is composed of 12 councilors, 10 of whom are elected.

The following were elected as councilors.

- Jerry Yaokasin (Independent)
- Cristina Romualdez (Nacionalista Party)
- Edwin Chua (Lakas–Kampi–CMD)
- Victor Emmanuel Domingo (Independent)
- Edward Frederick Chua (Nacionalista Party)
- Jeric Dane Granados (Lakas–Kampi–CMD)
- Jerry Uy (Liberal Party)
- Robert Andrade (Liberal Party)
- Bianco Mate (Lakas–Kampi–CMD)
- Neil Glova (Independent)

The following were the other candidates who ran in the city council election.

- Nestor Abrematea (Independent)
- Patrick Aguilos (Liberal Party)
- Antonio Araneta (Independent)
- Edgar Asoy (Pwersa ng Masang Pilipino)
- Adrian Banzon (Independent)
- Andres Basa Sr. (Pwersa ng Masang Pilipino)
- Roman Becher (Independent)
- Jose Buban (Independent)
- Rodrigo Cinco (Independent)
- Jose Mario Bagulaya (Liberal Party)
- Danilo Chua (Independent)
- Evangeline Esperas (Nacionalista Party)
- Robert Hernandez (Nacionalista Party)
- Raul Ibañez (Independent)
- Noel Lagonoy (Liberal Party)
- Santiago Lee (Lakas–Kampi–CMD)
- Antonio Lopez Jr. (Lakas–Kampi–CMD)
- Daniel Lunzaga (Independent)
- Sarah Mate-Lopez (Liberal Party)
- Gerardo Mondragon (Lakas–Kampi–CMD)
- Marshall Morallos (Liberal Party)
- Luisito Morante (Liberal Party)
- Marco Nardo (Lakas–Kampi–CMD)
- Nestor Opiniano (Independent)
- Ludovico Ortega (Liberal Party)
- Pedro Panis (Liberal Party)
- Rebecca Pacanan (Lakas–Kampi–CMD)
- Renato Sipaco (Independent)
- Sergio Sumayod (Lakas–Kampi–CMD)
- Robert Yap (Lakas–Kampi–CMD)
