= 2025 Philippine local elections in Eastern Visayas =

- May 12, 2025
- Gubernatorial elections
- 6 provincial governors and 2 city mayors
Party	Seats	+/–
Nacionalista	3	0
PFP	2	+2
Lakas	1	New
NPC	1	New
NUP	1	0
This lists parties that won seats. See the complete results below.
- Vice gubernatorial elections
- 6 provincial vice governors and 2 city vice mayors
Party	Seats	+/–
PFP	3	+3
Lakas	2	New
Nacionalista	2	0
NPC	1	New
This lists parties that won seats. See the complete results below.
- Provincial Board elections
- 60 provincial board members and 20 city councilors
Party	Seats	+/–
PFP	22	+22
Lakas	17	+16
Nacionalista	14	−8
NUP	11	+1
NPC	4	New
Liberal	2	0
KANP	1	0
Reporma	1	New
Tingog	1	0
Independent	5	+5
Vacant	2	+2
This lists parties that won seats. See the complete results below.

The 2025 Philippine local elections in Eastern Visayas were held on May 12, 2025.

== Summary ==
=== Governors ===
Province/city	Incumbent	Incumbent's party	Winner	Winner's party	Winning margin
Biliran	Gerard Espina	Nacionalista	Rogelio Espina	Nacionalista	85.42%
Eastern Samar	Ben Evardone	PFP	RV Evardone	PFP	45.22%
Leyte	Jericho Petilla	NPC	Jericho Petilla	NPC	89.96%
Northern Samar	Edwin Ongchuan	PFP	Harris Ongchuan	NUP	61.07%
Ormoc (ICC)	Lucy Torres-Gomez	PFP	Lucy Torres-Gomez	PFP	30.00%
Samar	Sharee Ann Tan	Nacionalista	Sharee Ann Tan	Nacionalista	Unopposed
Southern Leyte	Damian Mercado	Lakas	Damian Mercado	Lakas	2.09%
Tacloban (HUC)	Alfred Romualdez	Nacionalista	Alfred Romualdez	Nacionalista	52.62%

=== Vice governors ===
Province/city	Incumbent	Incumbent's party	Winner	Winner's party	Winning margin
Biliran	Kokoy Caneja	Lakas	Roselyn Espina-Paras	Lakas	Unopposed
Eastern Samar	Maricar Sison	PFP	Maricar Sison	PFP	33.10%
Leyte	Sandy Javier	NPC	Sandy Javier	NPC	Unopposed
Northern Samar	Clarence Dato	PFP	Clarence Dato	PFP	68.10%
Ormoc (ICC)	Carmelo Locsin Sr.	PDP–Laban	Carmelo Locsin Jr.	PFP	23.94%
Samar	Arnold Tan	Nacionalista	Arnold Tan	Nacionalista	Unopposed
Southern Leyte	Milai Mercado	Lakas	Milai Mercado	Lakas	Unopposed
Tacloban (HUC)	Edwin Chua	Aksyon	Raymund Romualdez	Nacionalista	56.70%

=== Provincial boards ===
Province/city	Seats	Party control		Composition
Province/city	Seats	Previous	Result	Composition
Biliran	10 elected 3 ex-officio	Nacionalista	No majority	Nacionalista (4); Lakas (3); Independent (1); Vacant (2)
Eastern Samar	10 elected 3 ex-officio	PDP–Laban	PFP	PFP (10)
Leyte	10 elected 3 ex-officio	PDP–Laban	No majority	NPC (4); NUP (4); PFP (1); Liberal (1)
Northern Samar	10 elected 3 ex-officio	NUP	NUP	NUP (7); PFP (1); Independent (2)
Ormoc (ICC)	10 elected 2 ex-officio	PDP–Laban	PFP	PFP (10)
Samar	10 elected 3 ex-officio	Nacionalista	Nacionalista	Nacionalista (10)
Southern Leyte	10 elected 2 ex-officio	PDP–Laban	Lakas	Lakas (7); Reporma (1); Tingog (1); Independent (1)
Tacloban (HUC)	10 elected 2 ex-officio	No majority	Lakas	Lakas (7); KNP (1); Liberal (1); Independent (1)

== Biliran ==
=== Governor ===
Incumbent Governor Gerard Espina of the Nacionalista Party retired.

The Nacionalista Party nominated Espina's father, former Biliran governor Rogelio Espina, who won the election against two other candidates.

Candidate	Party	Votes	%
Rogelio Espina	Nacionalista Party	74,282	91.59
Edgar Ambe	Independent	5,007	6.17
Jolan Bohol	Independent	1,817	2.24
Total		81,106	100.00
Valid votes		81,106	78.30
Invalid/blank votes		22,483	21.70
Total votes		103,589	100.00
Registered voters/turnout		124,191	83.41
Nacionalista hold			
Source: Commission on Elections

=== Vice Governor ===
Incumbent Vice Governor Kokoy Caneja of Lakas–CMD ran for the Biliran Provincial Board in the 1st provincial district. He was previously affiliated with the Nacionalista Party.

Lakas–CMD nominated provincial board member Roselyn Espina-Paras, who won the election unopposed.

Candidate	Party	Votes	%
Roselyn Espina-Paras	Lakas–CMD	67,506	100.00
Total		67,506	100.00
Valid votes		67,506	65.17
Invalid/blank votes		36,083	34.83
Total votes		103,589	100.00
Registered voters/turnout		124,191	83.41
Lakas hold			
Source: Commission on Elections

=== Provincial Board ===
Since Biliran's reclassification as a 2nd class province in 2025, the Biliran Provincial Board is composed of 13 board members, 10 of whom are elected.

The Nacionalista Party remained as the largest party in the provincial board with three seats, but lost its majority.

Two seats were left vacant as there were only eight candidates. The Local Government Code of 1991 states that vacancies in the provincial board are filled by the President of the Philippines.

Party	Votes	%	Seats	+/–
Nacionalista Party	75,343	51.12	4	–2
Lakas–CMD	60,425	41.00	3	+2
Independent	11,609	7.88	1	+1
Vacant			2	+2
Total	147,377	100.00	10	+2
Total votes	103,589	–		
Registered voters/turnout	124,191	83.41		
Source: Commission on Elections

==== 1st district ====
Biliran's 1st provincial district consists of the municipalities of Almería, Kawayan and Naval. Five board members are elected from this provincial district.

Four candidates were included in the ballot.

Candidate	Party	Votes	%
Kokoy Caneja	Lakas–CMD	25,762	32.48
Lucille Curso-Roa	Nacionalista Party	21,286	26.84
Miguel Casas Jr. (incumbent)	Nacionalista Party	17,745	22.37
Manolo Rubi	Lakas–CMD	14,522	18.31
Total		79,315	100.00
Total votes		51,885	–
Registered voters/turnout		61,929	83.78
Source: Commission on Elections

==== 2nd district ====
Biliran's 2nd provincial district consists of the municipalities of Biliran, Cabucgayan, Caibiran, Culaba and Maripipi. Five board members are elected from this provincial district.

Four candidates were included in the ballot.

Candidate	Party	Votes	%
Charlie Chan (incumbent)	Lakas–CMD	20,141	29.59
Allan Paul Tubis (incumbent)	Nacionalista Party	18,533	27.23
Nilo Peñaflor	Nacionalista Party	17,779	26.12
Lorenzo Reveldez Jr.	Independent	11,609	17.06
Total		68,062	100.00
Total votes		51,704	–
Registered voters/turnout		62,262	83.04
Source: Commission on Elections

== Eastern Samar ==
=== Governor ===
Incumbent Governor Ben Evardone of the Partido Federal ng Pilipinas (PFP) initially ran for a third term, but withdrew on October 8, 2024. He was previously affiliated with PDP–Laban.

The PFP nominated Eastern Samar Philippine Councilors League president RV Evardone, who won the election running against Quinapondan mayor Raffy Asebias (Alliance for Barangay Concerns).

Candidate	Party	Votes	%
RV Evardone	Partido Federal ng Pilipinas	204,564	72.61
Raffy Asebias	Alliance for Barangay Concerns	77,178	27.39
Total		281,742	100.00
Valid votes		281,742	91.01
Invalid/blank votes		27,837	8.99
Total votes		309,579	100.00
Registered voters/turnout		359,570	86.10
PFP hold			
Source: Commission on Elections

=== Vice Governor ===
Incumbent Vice Governor Maricar Sison of the Partido Federal ng Pilipinas ran for a third term. She was previously affiliated with PDP–Laban.

Sison won the election against Neil Camenforte (Independent).

Candidate	Party	Votes	%
Maricar Sison (incumbent)	Partido Federal ng Pilipinas	166,525	66.55
Neil Camenforte	Independent	83,702	33.45
Total		250,227	100.00
Valid votes		250,227	80.83
Invalid/blank votes		59,352	19.17
Total votes		309,579	100.00
Registered voters/turnout		359,570	86.10
PFP hold			
Source: Commission on Elections

=== Provincial Board ===
The Eastern Samar Provincial Board is composed of 13 board members, 10 of whom are elected.

The Partido Federal ng Pilipinas won 10 seats, gaining a majority in the provincial board.

Party	Votes	%	Seats	+/–
Partido Federal ng Pilipinas	784,497	79.37	10	+10
Independent	203,904	20.63	0	0
Total	988,401	100.00	10	0
Total votes	309,579	–		
Registered voters/turnout	359,570	86.10		
Source: Commission on Elections

==== 1st district ====
Eastern Samar's 1st provincial district consists of the city of Borongan and the municipalities of Arteche, Can-avid, Dolores, Jipapad, Maslog, Oras, San Julian, San Policarpo, Sulat and Taft. Five board members are elected from this provincial district.

Eight candidates were included in the ballot.

Candidate	Party	Votes	%
PJ Evardone (incumbent)	Partido Federal ng Pilipinas	119,970	21.97
Byron Suyot (incumbent)	Partido Federal ng Pilipinas	94,792	17.36
Gigi Zacate (incumbent)	Partido Federal ng Pilipinas	87,071	15.94
Jun Quelitano (incumbent)	Partido Federal ng Pilipinas	79,717	14.60
Timmy Campomanes	Partido Federal ng Pilipinas	74,335	13.61
Glenn Escoto	Independent	50,238	9.20
Pascual Robin Jr.	Independent	35,456	6.49
Dionesio Niñora	Independent	4,554	0.83
Total		546,133	100.00
Total votes		176,549	–
Registered voters/turnout		204,997	86.12
Source: Commission on Elections

==== 2nd district ====
Eastern Samar's 2nd provincial district consists of the municipalities of Balangiga, Balangkayan, General MacArthur, Giporlos, Guiuan, Hernani, Lawaan, Llorente, Maydolong, Mercedes, Quinapondan and Salcedo. Five board members are elected from this provincial district.

Nine candidates were included in the ballot.

Candidate	Party	Votes	%
Pol Gonzales (incumbent)	Partido Federal ng Pilipinas	72,421	16.37
Christelle Yadao (incumbent)	Partido Federal ng Pilipinas	71,570	16.18
Evet Bandoy-Gaylon (incumbent)	Partido Federal ng Pilipinas	71,092	16.07
Pearl Evardone	Partido Federal ng Pilipinas	60,872	13.76
Nesty Cablao (incumbent)	Partido Federal ng Pilipinas	52,657	11.91
Hayasin Go	Independent	40,516	9.16
Jenny Baldono	Independent	35,467	8.02
Betty Lopez-Reyes	Independent	31,933	7.22
Jessie Guab	Independent	5,740	1.30
Total		442,268	100.00
Total votes		133,030	–
Registered voters/turnout		154,573	86.06
Source: Commission on Elections

== Leyte ==
=== Governor ===
Incumbent Governor Jericho Petilla of the Nationalist People's Coalition ran for a second term. He was previously affiliated with PDP–Laban.

Petilla won re-election against Romeo Plasquita (Independent).

Candidate	Party	Votes	%
Jericho Petilla (incumbent)	Nationalist People's Coalition	661,299	94.98
Romeo Plasquita	Independent	34,986	5.02
Total		696,285	100.00
Valid votes		696,285	73.65
Invalid/blank votes		249,108	26.35
Total votes		945,393	100.00
Registered voters/turnout		1,093,480	86.46
NPC hold			
Source: Commission on Elections

=== Vice Governor ===
Incumbent Vice Governor Sandy Javier of the Nationalist People's Coalition won re-election for a second term unopposed. He was previously affiliated with PDP–Laban.

Candidate	Party	Votes	%
Sandy Javier (incumbent)	Nationalist People's Coalition	569,092	100.00
Total		569,092	100.00
Valid votes		569,092	60.20
Invalid/blank votes		376,301	39.80
Total votes		945,393	100.00
Registered voters/turnout		1,093,480	86.46
NPC hold			
Source: Commission on Elections

=== Provincial Board ===
The Leyte Provincial Board is composed of 13 board members, 10 of whom are elected.

The Nationalist People's Coalition tied with the National Unity Party at four seats each.

Party	Votes	%	Seats	+/–
Nationalist People's Coalition	440,837	41.79	4	New
National Unity Party	242,307	22.97	4	+3
Partido Federal ng Pilipinas	197,977	18.77	1	New
Liberal Party	64,276	6.09	1	0
Aksyon Demokratiko	49,158	4.66	0	New
Independent	60,216	5.71	0	0
Total	1,054,771	100.00	10	0
Total votes	945,393	–		
Registered voters/turnout	1,093,480	86.46		
Source: Commission on Elections

==== 1st district ====
Leyte's 1st provincial district consists of the same area as Leyte's 1st legislative district excluding the city of Tacloban. Two board members are elected from this provincial district.

Three candidates were included in the ballot.

Candidate	Party	Votes	%
Wilson Uy (incumbent)	Nationalist People's Coalition	67,331	44.82
Bolingling Reposar (incumbent)	Liberal Party	64,276	42.78
Ray Junia	Independent	18,627	12.40
Total		150,234	100.00
Total votes		164,673	–
Registered voters/turnout		189,316	86.98
Source: Commission on Elections

==== 2nd district ====
Leyte's 2nd provincial district consists of the same area as Leyte's 2nd legislative district. Two board members are elected from this provincial district.

Four candidates were included in the ballot.

Candidate	Party	Votes	%
Raissa Villasin (incumbent)	Nationalist People's Coalition	108,558	48.83
Mildred Joy Que	Partido Federal ng Pilipinas	72,162	32.46
Carlo Pilpa	Independent	23,128	10.40
Concesa Emnas	Independent	18,461	8.30
Total		222,309	100.00
Total votes		262,254	–
Registered voters/turnout		305,526	85.84
Source: Commission on Elections

==== 3rd district ====
Leyte's 3rd provincial district consists of the same area as Leyte's 3rd legislative district. Two board members are elected from this provincial district.

Three candidates were included in the ballot.

Candidate	Party	Votes	%
Chinggay Veloso (incumbent)	National Unity Party	53,895	35.09
Alan Ang	National Unity Party	50,551	32.91
Bimbim Remandaban	Aksyon Demokratiko	49,158	32.00
Total		153,604	100.00
Total votes		117,390	–
Registered voters/turnout		133,378	88.01
Source: Commission on Elections

==== 4th district ====
Leyte's 4th provincial district consists of the same area as Leyte's 4th legislative district excluding the city of Ormoc. Two board members are elected from this provincial district.

Four candidates were included in the ballot.

Candidate	Party	Votes	%
Ivan Centino (incumbent)	National Unity Party	70,009	26.55
Rico Codilla	National Unity Party	67,852	25.73
Indoy Arevalo	Partido Federal ng Pilipinas	66,273	25.13
Rex Capanas	Partido Federal ng Pilipinas	59,542	22.58
Total		263,676	100.00
Total votes		171,344	–
Registered voters/turnout		192,048	89.22
Source: Commission on Elections

==== 5th district ====
Leyte's 5th provincial district consists of the same area as Leyte's 5th legislative district. Two board members are elected from this provincial district.

Two candidates were included in the ballot.

Candidate	Party	Votes	%
Mike Cari (incumbent)	Nationalist People's Coalition	137,476	51.89
Carlo Loreto (incumbent)	Nationalist People's Coalition	127,472	48.11
Total		264,948	100.00
Total votes		229,732	–
Registered voters/turnout		273,212	84.09
Source: Commission on Elections

== Northern Samar ==
=== Governor ===
Incumbent Governor Edwin Ongchuan of the Partido Federal ng Pilipinas ran for the House of Representatives in Northern Samar's 2nd legislative district. He was previously affiliated with the National Unity Party.

Ongchuan endorsed his cousin, representative Harris Ongchuan (National Unity Party), who won the election against former representative Harlin Abayon (Aksyon Demokratiko) and Essie Unay (Independent).

Candidate	Party	Votes	%
Harris Ongchuan	National Unity Party	212,471	79.28
Harlin Abayon	Aksyon Demokratiko	48,792	18.21
Essie Unay	Independent	6,750	2.52
Total		268,013	100.00
Valid votes		268,013	74.47
Invalid/blank votes		91,889	25.53
Total votes		359,902	100.00
Registered voters/turnout		449,191	80.12
NUP gain from PFP			
Source: Commission on Elections

=== Vice Governor ===
Incumbent Vice Governor Clarence Dato of the Partido Federal ng Pilipinas ran for a second term. He was previously affiliated with the National Unity Party.

Dato won re-election against Samuel Picardal (Aksyon Demokratiko).

Candidate	Party	Votes	%
Clarence Dato (incumbent)	Partido Federal ng Pilipinas	189,057	84.05
Samuel Picardal	Aksyon Demokratiko	35,872	15.95
Total		224,929	100.00
Valid votes		224,929	62.50
Invalid/blank votes		134,973	37.50
Total votes		359,902	100.00
Registered voters/turnout		449,191	80.12
PFP hold			
Source: Commission on Elections

=== Provincial Board ===
The Northern Samar Provincial Board is composed of 13 board members, 10 of whom are elected.

The National Unity Party won seven seats, maintaining its majority in the provincial board.

Party	Votes	%	Seats	+/–
National Unity Party	538,507	49.50	7	+6
Partido Federal ng Pilipinas	121,999	11.21	1	New
Aksyon Demokratiko	101,089	9.29	0	New
Liberal Party	72,905	6.70	0	–1
Bunyog Party	9,418	0.87	0	New
Independent	244,026	22.43	2	+2
Total	1,087,944	100.00	10	0
Total votes	359,902	–		
Registered voters/turnout	449,191	80.12		
Source: Commission on Elections

==== 1st district ====
Northern Samar's 1st provincial district consists of the same area as Northern Samar's 1st legislative district. Five board members are elected from this provincial district.

12 candidates were included in the ballot.

Candidate	Party	Votes	%
Lope Dorado Jr.	Partido Federal ng Pilipinas	121,999	19.18
Nadia Ong	Independent	113,189	17.79
Yenyen Uy	National Unity Party	110,192	17.32
Neil Hernandez	Independent	88,800	13.96
Vicvic Singzon (incumbent)	National Unity Party	78,536	12.35
Jing Layon (incumbent)	Liberal Party	72,905	11.46
Mark Cloma	Independent	11,488	1.81
Oscar Garalde	Aksyon Demokratiko	11,095	1.74
Dodoy Camposano	Bunyog Party	9,418	1.48
Nicolas Purog Jr.	Aksyon Demokratiko	7,508	1.18
Alvin Salazar	Aksyon Demokratiko	7,035	1.11
Crezan Visaya	Aksyon Demokratiko	3,928	0.62
Total		636,093	100.00
Total votes		205,866	–
Registered voters/turnout		253,112	81.33
Source: Commission on Elections

==== 2nd district ====
Northern Samar's 2nd provincial district consists of the same area as Northern Samar's 2nd legislative district. Five board members are elected from this provincial district.

12 candidates were included in the ballot.

Candidate	Party	Votes	%
Don Abalon (incumbent)	National Unity Party	84,665	18.74
Dex Galit (incumbent)	National Unity Party	76,419	16.91
Gina Ong	National Unity Party	70,651	15.64
Ara Gillamac	National Unity Party	68,605	15.18
Leding Laodenio (incumbent)	National Unity Party	49,439	10.94
Antonio Casio Jr.	Aksyon Demokratiko	26,195	5.80
Frumenz Lagrimas	Independent	22,744	5.03
Marlo Agno	Aksyon Demokratiko	13,310	2.95
Randy Lambino	Aksyon Demokratiko	13,307	2.94
Vic Caparroso	Aksyon Demokratiko	10,677	2.36
Eledio Acibar	Aksyon Demokratiko	8,034	1.78
Oscar Ejercito	Independent	7,805	1.73
Total		451,851	100.00
Total votes		154,036	–
Registered voters/turnout		196,079	78.56
Source: Commission on Elections

== Ormoc ==
=== Mayor ===
Incumbent Mayor Lucy Torres-Gomez of the Partido Federal ng Pilipinas ran for a second term. She was previously affiliated with PDP–Laban.

Torres-Gomez won re-election against Violy Codilla (National Unity Party).

Candidate	Party	Votes	%
Lucy Torres-Gomez (incumbent)	Partido Federal ng Pilipinas	89,123	65.00
Violy Codilla	National Unity Party	47,994	35.00
Total		137,117	100.00
Valid votes		137,117	97.82
Invalid/blank votes		3,062	2.18
Total votes		140,179	100.00
Registered voters/turnout		161,281	86.92
PFP hold			
Source: Commission on Elections

=== Vice Mayor ===
Incumbent Vice Mayor Carmelo Locsin Sr. of the PDP–Laban retired.

Locsin endorsed his son, former Ormoc vice mayor Carmelo Locsin Jr. (Partido Federal ng Pilipinas), who won the election against city councilor Roiland Villasencio (National Unity Party).

Candidate	Party	Votes	%
Carmelo Locsin Jr.	Partido Federal ng Pilipinas	82,733	61.97
Roiland Villasencio	National Unity Party	50,764	38.03
Total		133,497	100.00
Valid votes		133,497	95.23
Invalid/blank votes		6,682	4.77
Total votes		140,179	100.00
Registered voters/turnout		161,281	86.92
PFP gain from PDP–Laban			
Source: Commission on Elections

=== City Council ===
The Ormoc City Council is composed of 12 councilors, 10 of whom are elected.

22 candidates were included in the ballot.

The Partido Federal ng Pilipinas won 10 seats, gaining a majority in the city council.

Party	Votes	%	Seats	+/–
Partido Federal ng Pilipinas	736,983	61.37	10	New
National Unity Party	458,129	38.15	0	New
Partido Lakas ng Masa	2,974	0.25	0	New
Independent	2,705	0.23	0	0
Total	1,200,791	100.00	10	0
Total votes	140,179	–		
Registered voters/turnout	161,281	86.92		
Source: Commission on Elections

Candidate	Party	Votes	%
Ari Larrazabal	Partido Federal ng Pilipinas	78,017	6.50
Edmund Kierulf (incumbent)	Partido Federal ng Pilipinas	76,477	6.37
Tommy Serafica	Partido Federal ng Pilipinas	75,538	6.29
Jasper Lucero (incumbent)	Partido Federal ng Pilipinas	75,323	6.27
Perok Rodriguez (incumbent)	Partido Federal ng Pilipinas	74,308	6.19
Caren Torres-Rama (incumbent)	Partido Federal ng Pilipinas	73,932	6.16
Gerry Penserga	Partido Federal ng Pilipinas	72,782	6.06
Burt Pades (incumbent)	Partido Federal ng Pilipinas	71,868	5.99
Kia Mercadal	Partido Federal ng Pilipinas	70,706	5.89
Lalaine Marcos (incumbent)	Partido Federal ng Pilipinas	68,032	5.67
Jing-Jing Codilla	National Unity Party	48,571	4.04
Dodjie Omega	National Unity Party	48,151	4.01
Fernan Lingo	National Unity Party	47,891	3.99
RJ Deen	National Unity Party	47,171	3.93
Ando Conejos	National Unity Party	46,573	3.88
Doni Cayanong	National Unity Party	45,344	3.78
Larry Singson	National Unity Party	44,330	3.69
Jeffrey del Socorro	National Unity Party	44,087	3.67
Elmer Placido	National Unity Party	43,457	3.62
Ralph Yauna	National Unity Party	42,554	3.54
Camlon Aliniabon	Partido Lakas ng Masa	2,974	0.25
Saldo Solis	Independent	2,705	0.23
Total		1,200,791	100.00
Registered voters/turnout		140,179	–
Source: Commission on Elections

== Samar ==
=== Governor ===
Incumbent Governor Sharee Ann Tan of the Nacionalista Party won re-election for a second term unopposed.

Candidate	Party	Votes	%
Sharee Ann Tan (incumbent)	Nacionalista Party	419,470	100.00
Total		419,470	100.00
Valid votes		419,470	83.35
Invalid/blank votes		83,769	16.65
Total votes		503,239	100.00
Registered voters/turnout		625,543	80.45
Nacionalista hold			
Source: Commission on Elections

=== Vice Governor ===
Incumbent Vice Governor Arnold Tan of the Nacionalista Party won re-election for a second term unopposed.

Candidate	Party	Votes	%
Arnold Tan (incumbent)	Nacionalista Party	405,879	100.00
Total		405,879	100.00
Valid votes		405,879	80.65
Invalid/blank votes		97,360	19.35
Total votes		503,239	100.00
Registered voters/turnout		625,543	80.45
Nacionalista hold			
Source: Commission on Elections

=== Provincial Board ===
The Samar Provincial Board consists of 13 board members, 10 of whom are elected.

The Nacionalista Party won 10 seats, maintaining their majority in the provincial board.

Party	Votes	%	Seats	+/–
Nacionalista Party	1,581,486	94.70	10	0
Liberal Party	34,773	2.08	0	0
Independent	53,665	3.21	0	0
Total	1,669,924	100.00	10	0
Total votes	503,239	–		
Registered voters/turnout	625,543	80.45		
Source: Commission on Elections

==== 1st district ====
Samar's 1st provincial district consists of the same area as Samar's 1st legislative district. Five board members are elected from this provincial district.

Five candidates were included in the ballot.

Candidate	Party	Votes	%
Edward Clemens (incumbent)	Nacionalista Party	179,813	20.31
Abbie Irigon	Nacionalista Party	178,825	20.20
Dawn Diomangay	Nacionalista Party	177,078	20.01
Milay Olaje (incumbent)	Nacionalista Party	176,099	19.89
Anecio Guades (incumbent)	Nacionalista Party	173,346	19.58
Total		885,161	100.00
Total votes		229,519	–
Registered voters/turnout		289,756	79.21
Source: Commission on Elections

==== 2nd district ====
Samar's 2nd provincial district consists of the same area as Samar's 2nd legislative district. Five board members are elected from this provincial district.

Seven candidates were included in the ballot.

Candidate	Party	Votes	%
Bembot Bermejo (incumbent)	Nacionalista Party	149,793	19.09
Yolanda Tan	Nacionalista Party	141,291	18.00
Elpa Estorninos (incumbent)	Nacionalista Party	139,690	17.80
Bebot Nacario (incumbent)	Nacionalista Party	136,285	17.37
Jade Kie Tiu	Nacionalista Party	129,266	16.47
Alex Bolok	Independent	53,665	6.84
Nengneng Sabenecio (incumbent)	Liberal Party	34,773	4.43
Total		784,763	100.00
Total votes		273,720	–
Registered voters/turnout		335,787	81.52
Source: Commission on Elections

== Southern Leyte ==
=== Governor ===
Incumbent Governor Damian Mercado of Lakas–CMD ran for a third term. He was previously affiliated with PDP–Laban.

Mercado won re-election against Amalia Yap (Independent) and Leo Oliverio (Independent).

Candidate	Party	Votes	%
Damian Mercado (incumbent)	Lakas–CMD	126,536	50.65
Amalia Yap	Independent	121,334	48.56
Leo Oliverio	Independent	1,978	0.79
Total		249,848	100.00
Valid votes		249,848	93.67
Invalid/blank votes		16,895	6.33
Total votes		266,743	100.00
Registered voters/turnout		300,005	88.91
Lakas hold			
Source: Commission on Elections

=== Vice Governor ===
Incumbent Vice Governor Milai Mercado of Lakas–CMD won re-election for a second term unopposed. She was previously affiliated with PDP–Laban.

Candidate	Party	Votes	%
Milai Mercado (incumbent)	Lakas–CMD	139,765	100.00
Total		139,765	100.00
Valid votes		139,765	52.40
Invalid/blank votes		126,978	47.60
Total votes		266,743	100.00
Registered voters/turnout		300,005	88.91
Lakas hold			
Source: Commission on Elections

=== Provincial Board ===
Since Southern Leyte's reclassification as a 1st class province in 2025, the Southern Leyte Provincial Board is composed of 12 board members, 10 of whom are elected.

Lakas–CMD won seven seats, gaining a majority in the provincial board.

Party	Votes	%	Seats	+/–
Lakas–CMD	351,340	60.48	7	+7
Partido para sa Demokratikong Reporma	42,738	7.36	1	New
Tingog Sinirangan	48,964	8.43	1	New
Independent	137,852	23.73	1	+1
Total	580,894	100.00	10	+2
Total votes	266,743	–		
Registered voters/turnout	300,005	88.91		
Source: Commission on Elections

==== 1st district ====
Southern Leyte's 1st provincial district consists of the same area as Southern Leyte's 1st legislative district. Five board members are elected from this provincial district.

Six candidates were included in the ballot.

Candidate	Party	Votes	%
Jojo Maraon (incumbent)	Lakas–CMD	51,259	19.87
Alan Jose Aroy	Lakas–CMD	48,166	18.67
Boy Rojas (incumbent)	Lakas–CMD	45,013	17.45
Rolly Manalo	Partido para sa Demokratikong Reporma	42,738	16.57
King Ruales	Lakas–CMD	37,650	14.60
Josefino Cinco	Independent	33,099	12.83
Total		257,925	100.00
Total votes		118,792	–
Registered voters/turnout		134,738	88.17
Source: Commission on Elections

==== 2nd district ====
Southern Leyte's 2nd provincial district consists of the same area as Southern Leyte's 2nd legislative district. Five board members are elected from this provincial district.

Seven candidates were included in the ballot.

Candidate	Party	Votes	%
Nap Regis (incumbent)	Lakas–CMD	61,656	19.09
Rolan Bacoy (incumbent)	Lakas–CMD	57,404	17.77
Roy Dator	Independent	52,788	16.34
Boy Mortera (incumbent)	Lakas–CMD	50,192	15.54
Jay Calva	Tingog Sinirangan	48,964	15.16
Jose Loquinte	Independent	38,170	11.82
Berting Lariba	Independent	13,795	4.27
Total		322,969	100.00
Total votes		147,951	–
Registered voters/turnout		165,267	89.52
Source: Commission on Elections

== Tacloban ==
=== Mayor ===
Incumbent Mayor Alfred Romualdez of the Nacionalista Party ran for a third term.

Romualdez won re-election against Michael dela Cruz (Independent).

Candidate	Party	Votes	%
Alfred Romualdez (incumbent)	Nacionalista Party	78,193	76.31
Michael dela Cruz	Independent	24,274	23.69
Total		102,467	100.00
Valid votes		102,467	86.01
Invalid/blank votes		16,664	13.99
Total votes		119,131	100.00
Registered voters/turnout		146,293	81.43
Nacionalista hold			
Source: Commission on Elections

=== Vice Mayor ===
Incumbent Vice Mayor Edwin Chua of Aksyon Demokratiko retired.

Tacloban Liga ng mga Barangay president Raymund Romualdez (Nacionalista Party), son of Tacloban mayor Alfred Romualdez, won the election against his cousin, Makoy Romualdez (Independent).

Candidate	Party	Votes	%
Raymund Romualdez	Nacionalista	73,038	78.35
Makoy Romualdez	Independent	20,185	21.65
Total		93,223	100.00
Valid votes		93,223	78.25
Invalid/blank votes		25,908	21.75
Total votes		119,131	100.00
Registered voters/turnout		146,293	81.43
Nacionalista hold			
Source: Commission on Elections

=== City Council ===
The Tacloban City Council is composed of 12 councilors, 10 of whom are elected.

20 candidates were included in the ballot.

Lakas–CMD won seven seats, gaining a majority in the city council.

Party	Votes	%	Seats	+/–
Lakas–CMD	422,148	61.40	7	New
Katipunan ng Nagkakaisang Pilipino	72,833	10.59	1	0
Liberal Party	39,149	5.69	1	+1
Tingog Sinirangan	28,362	4.12	0	–1
Independent	125,077	18.19	1	+1
Total	687,569	100.00	10	0
Total votes	119,131	–		
Registered voters/turnout	146,293	81.43		
Source: Commission on Elections

Candidate	Party	Votes	%
Edmund Edward Chua	Lakas–CMD	77,216	11.23
Edward Frederick Chua (incumbent)	Lakas–CMD	74,472	10.83
Jerry Uy (incumbent)	Katipunan ng Nagkakaisang Pilipino	72,833	10.59
Marty Romualdez	Lakas–CMD	70,933	10.32
Eric de Veyra	Independent	50,491	7.34
Dandee Grafil	Lakas–CMD	41,748	6.07
Chris Esperas (incumbent)	Lakas–CMD	40,867	5.94
Brian Granados (incumbent)	Lakas–CMD	40,708	5.92
Jom Bagulaya	Liberal Party	39,149	5.69
Edson Malaki (incumbent)	Lakas–CMD	38,509	5.60
Jeric Granados (incumbent)	Lakas–CMD	37,695	5.48
Leo Bahin (incumbent)	Tingog Sinirangan	28,362	4.12
Bob Abellanosa	Independent	22,149	3.22
Jimmy Laurente	Independent	14,455	2.10
Rulfin Macaya	Independent	9,003	1.31
Rolando Salino	Independent	8,757	1.27
Paking Condalor	Independent	6,264	0.91
Salde Labatos	Independent	6,233	0.91
Chekoy Gambala	Independent	4,290	0.62
Renato Sardeña	Independent	3,435	0.50
Total		687,569	100.00
Total votes		119,131	–
Registered voters/turnout		146,293	81.43
Source: Commission on Elections

== Election-related incidents ==
On April 10, Kerwin Espinosa, a mayoral candidate of Albuera, Leyte who had previously admitted to being a drug trafficker, was shot and injured along with his running-mate for vice mayor and a bystander while at a campaign rally. The next day, suspected explosive materials were discovered abandoned at his campaign headquarters.
