= Legislative districts of Eastern Samar =

Electoral districts of Eastern Samar, Philippines.

The legislative districts of Eastern Samar are the representations of the province of Eastern Samar in the various national legislatures of the Philippines. The province is currently represented in the lower house of the Congress of the Philippines through its lone congressional district.

== History ==
Eastern Samar was represented as the third district of Samar until Republic Act No. 4221 was ratified in November 1965, after which the representative of the third district of Samar automatically served as Eastern Samar's representative. It was part of the representation of Region VIII from 1978 to 1984.

== Lone District ==
- Population (2015): 467,160

Period	Representative
6th Congress; 1965–1969	see 3rd District of Samar
6th Congress; 1965–1969	Felipe J. Abrigo (Note: Elected in 1965 as representative of the third district of Samar. Automatically became representative of the lone district of Eastern Samar upon ratification of R.A. 4221 in November 1965.)
7th Congress; 1969–1972	Felipe J. Abrigo
8th Congress; 1987–1992	Jose T. Ramirez
9th Congress; 1992–1995	Jose T. Ramirez
10th Congress; 1995–1998	Jose T. Ramirez
11th Congress; 1998–2001	Marcelino Libanan (Note: Appointed Commissioner of the Bureau of Immigration on April 18, 2007.)
12th Congress; 2001–2004	Marcelino Libanan
13th Congress; 2004–2007	Marcelino Libanan
14th Congress; 2007–2010	Teodolo M. Coquilla
15th Congress; 2010–2013	Ben Evardone
16th Congress; 2013–2016	Ben Evardone
17th Congress; 2016–2019	Ben Evardone
18th Congress; 2019–2022	Maria Fe Abunda
19th Congress; 2022–2025	Maria Fe Abunda
14th Congress; 2025–2028	Sheen Gonzales

== At-large (defunct) ==
Period	Assemblyman
Regular Batasang Pambansa; 1984–1986	Vicente O. Valley

== See also ==
- Legislative districts of Samar
