= Marcelino Libanan =

Filipino politician (born 1963)

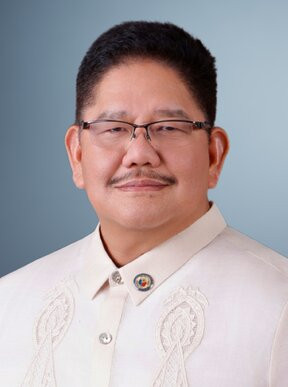
- Official portrait, 2025

House Minority Leader
- Incumbent
- Assumed office July 25, 2022
- Preceded by: Stephen Paduano

Member of the Philippine House of Representatives for the 4Ps Party-list
- Incumbent
- Assumed office June 30, 2022 Serving with Jonathan Clement Abalos

Commissioner of the Bureau of Immigration
- In office May 2007 – July 2010
- Appointed by: Gloria Macapagal Arroyo
- Preceded by: Roy Almoro
- Succeeded by: Ronaldo Ledesma

Member of the Philippine House of Representatives from Eastern Samar's lone district
- In office June 30, 1998 – April 18, 2007
- Preceded by: Jose Mari Tan
- Succeeded by: Teodulo M. Coquilla

Vice Governor of Eastern Samar
- In office June 30, 1992 – June 30, 1995
- Governor: Lutgardo Barbo

Personal details
- Born: Marcelino Chicano Libanan; September 20, 1963 (age 63) Quezon City, Philippines
- Party: 4Ps (party-list; 2021–present)
- Other political affiliations: LAMMP (1998–2001); NPC (2001–2004); Lakas (1992–1995, 2004–2007)
- Spouse: Elda Ellado
- Relatives: Sheen Gonzales (son-in-law)
- Education: Divine Word University (BS, LLB)
- Profession: Politician

Marcelino "Nonoy" Chicano Libanan (born September 20, 1963) is a Filipino lawyer and politician who has served as the House minority leader since 2022. A sectoral representative for 4Ps Partylist, he has been a member of the chamber since 2022 and previously served as the representative for Eastern Samar's lone district from 1998 to 2007.

Libanan entered politics in 1992 after being elected as the vice governor of Eastern Samar, a position he would hold until 1995. He was first elected to Congress in 1998, under Lakas. As a representative, he pursued legislation urging the repatriation of the Balangiga bells to Eastern Samar and was involved in drafting the Human Security Act. He left the chamber early in 2007 to become the commissioner of the Bureau of Immigration, a position he would hold until 2010. After leaving office, he was implicated in the Pork barrel scam.

Libanan returned to electoral politics in 2022, after being elected as the sectoral representative for 4Ps Partylist. In July 2025, he was elected House minority leader. During his tenure, he pursued legislation related to health and education. During the impeachment of Sara Duterte, Libanan was named as the lead prosecutor for the trial.

== Early life ==
Libanan was born in Quezon City, Philippines on September 20, 1963. The family soon relocated to Taft, Eastern Samar, where Libanan spent most of his early life. Libanan's lineage has links to the Philippine Revolution; he is a descendant of Katipunero Valentín Díaz through his great-grandmother, Basília Díaz. The historical connection was highlighted during a budget hearing by Secretary Gilbert Teodoro. For high school, he attended Seminario de Jesús Nazareno as a seminarian. Libanan pursued higher education at Divine Word University.

== Early career (1992–2007) ==
Libanan was elected as the vice governor of Eastern Samar from 1992 to 1995. In 1991, Libanan along with other Samar politicians were accused of "assuming bad faith" against politician Agustin Docena, a replacement of dead member Luis Capito, which led to suspension of their jobs. Libanan started a petition to reinstate his job, which was dismissed. During the 1995 Philippine general election, Libanan ran for the position of congressman for Eastern Samar's at-large congressional district, losing to Jose Tan Ramirez. Libanan filed an election protest, though the petition was dismissed.

In 1998, he was the congressman for Eastern Samar's at-large congressional district for three terms with Lakas–CMD. During his tenure as congressman, he was awarded a standing ovation from the Public Attorney's Office of the Philippines after signing a law giving special allowance to PAO officials. He signed a bill to return the Balangiga bells to Eastern Samar. Nationally, he created a house version of a bill, which was named the Human Security Act. He resigned early to be the Bureau of Immigration Commissioner on April 18, 2007.

== Commissioner of the Bureau of Immigration (2007–2010) ==
During his tenure as Bureau of Immigration Commissioner, 142 foreigners were deported, most in the year 2008. Along with deportation, over 60,000 people have regained Filipino citizenship. Foreign students increased by 63% during his tenure. Libanan implemented a law which requires tourist workers from the Philippines to sign a waiver removing them from any type of blame from their destination country. Inside the Bureau of Immigration, he set a removal of noontime for workers for supposed faster service. In 2009, Libanan was involved in controversy following alleged fund misuse in the Bureau of Immigration; no charges were pressed against him.

== Outside government (2010–2022) ==
In 2015, he was involved in the Pork barrel scam when Energy Regulatory Commission Chief Zenaida Ducut, managed the pork-barrel fund of Libanan, from which she managed the fund of Janet Lim-Napoles, a Filipino businesswoman and convicted criminal.

In July 2017, Libanan was indicted by the Office of the Ombudsman for graft in the purchase of 2,164 bags of fertilizer worth ₱3.25 million as part of the fertilizer fund scam, but was cleared in the purchase of 1,168 bags of fertilizer worth ₱1.63 million. The graft offense was found after they allegedly bought from Akame Marketing International in 2004.

== Congressional bids (2022, 2025) ==
=== 2022 ===
In the 2022 Philippine general election, Libanan sought election to the House of Representatives under the 4Ps party-list as its first nominee. Watchdog groups, including Partylist Watch, criticized 4Ps as a "fake" party-list, stating that the organization " [had] no experience in championing the interests of the poor" and "has links to personalities implicated in corruption in the past", citing Libanan's 2017 graft case. His party would receive 4.30% of the vote, securing a seat in Congress.

=== 2025 ===
In 2025, Libanan initially planned to run for representative in Eastern Samar's lone district, while remaining a member of 4Ps. He was floated as a candidate for governor of Eastern Samar, with 58 representatives asking Speaker Martin Romualdez to support Libanan for governor with Ben Evardone as his running mate. He would decline a run for either office after meeting with Maria Fe Abunda, where they decided she would run unopposed in her district. Libanan also asked Abunda not to field candidates against his local allies and support his legislative priorities.

Libanan ran for reelection as the representative for 4Ps, running again as its first nominee. The party would receive 3.51% of the votes, gaining two seats and securing a second term in office.

== House of Representatives (since 2022) ==
Libanan took office as a representative on June 30, 2022. During his term, Libanan expressed solidarity with President Bongbong Marcos and UniTeam. On the other hand, Libanan strictly opposed the tenure of Rodrigo Duterte and Ronald dela Rosa, criticizing their actions. He criticized Sara Duterte's decision to skip a debate on the planned ₱2.307 billion Office of the Vice President budget.

=== House Minority Leader ===
On July 26, 2025, the House minority elected Libanan as House minority leader. Representative Edcel Lagman criticized his election as minority leader, deeming the minority bloc "co-opted" under his leadership.

As a representative, Libanan introduced a bill to expand the languages taught under the Department of Education.

He called to create a panel to investigate drug war killings, similar to the Agrava Fact-Finding Board. Following his statement, he urged protection for the Quad Committee witnesses, stating that witnesses and their family members are "extremely vulnerable to potential reprisals."

Libanan urged Congress to make a patient information system to improve health care in the country.

Libanan planned the formation of the Samar Island Region through House Bill 10727. If accepted, the region would be the 19th region in the Philippines. Locally, Libanan created a task force to protect the island of Homonhon, where Ferdinand Magellan first landed in the Philippines.

On February 5, 2025, Libanan joined the prosecution team consisting of 11 lawmakers for the Impeachment of Sara Duterte. On March 25, he was picked as the lead prosecutor in the trial.

In the 20th Congress of the Philippines, Libanan was reelected as the House Minority Leader, gaining the support of 29 opposition lawmakers.

== Personal life ==
Libanan is married to Elda Libanan, who has been active in local politics. Elda ran for the Eastern Samar lone district seat in the 2007 Philippine general election as a Lakas-CMD party candidate but did not win. His son-in-law is congressman Sheen Gonzales, who was a former vice governor and a two-time mayor of Guiuan.

House of Representatives of the Philippines
Preceded by Stephen Paduano	Minority Floor Leader of the House of Representatives of the Philippines; 2022–present	Incumbent
