= Sulat =

Municipality in Eastern Samar, Philippines

- Municipality
- Municipality of Sulat
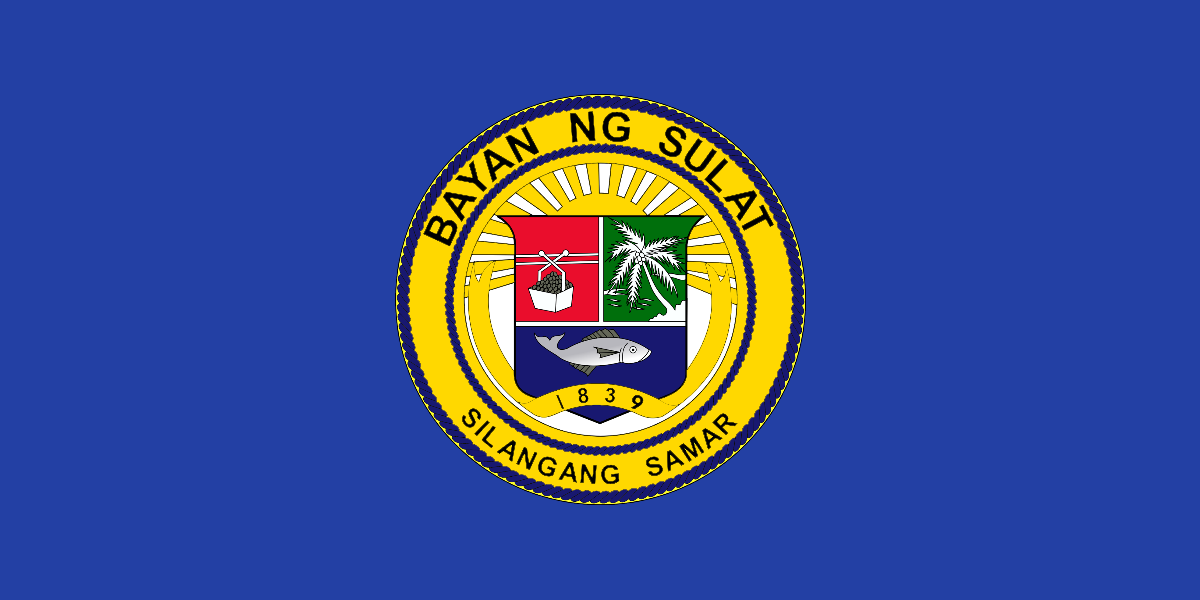
- Flag Seal

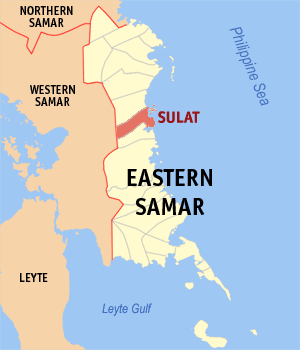
- Map of Eastern Samar with Sulat highlighted
- Interactive map of Sulat
- Location within the Philippines
- Coordinates: 11°49′N 125°27′E
- Country: Philippines
- Region: Eastern Visayas
- Province: Eastern Samar
- District: Lone district
- Barangays: 18 (see Barangays)

Government
  - Type: Sangguniang Bayan
  - Mayor: Javier E. Zacate
  - Vice Mayor: Dionesio L. Evardone
  - Representative: Maria Fe R. Abunda
  - Councilors: List: • Ralph Vincent Evardone; • Alvin Orenda; • Sofia Isabelle Zacate; • Noe Aclan; • Paul Z. Sumbilla; • Romeo A. Limbo; • Carol Balagapo; • Ma. Socorro P. Chacon; DILG Masterlist of Officials
  - Electorate: 12,213 voters (2025)

Area
  - Total: 169.75 km^{2} (65.54 sq mi)
- Elevation: 15 m (49 ft)
- Highest elevation: 182 m (597 ft)
- Lowest elevation: 0 m (0 ft)

Population (2024 census)
  - Total: 15,776
  - Density: 92.937/km^{2} (240.70/sq mi)
  - Households: 4,013

Economy
  - Income class: 4th municipal income class
  - Poverty incidence: 29.17% (2023)
  - Revenue: ₱ 127.1 million (2024)
  - Assets: ₱ 298.2 million (2024)
  - Expenditure: ₱ 115.3 million (2024)
  - Liabilities: ₱ 40.99 million (2024)

Service provider
  - Electricity: Eastern Samar Electric Cooperative (ESAMELCO)
- Time zone: UTC+8 (PST)
- ZIP code: 6815
- PSGC: 0802622000
- IDD : area code: +63 (0)55
- Native languages: Waray; Tagalog
- Patron saint: Saint Ignatius of Loyola
- Website: www.sulat-esamar.gov.ph

Sulat, officially the Municipality of Sulat (Waray: Bungto han Sulat; Tagalog: Bayan ng Sulat), is a municipality in the province of Eastern Samar, Philippines. According to the 2024 census, it has a population of 15,776 people.

== Geography ==
=== Barangays ===
Sulat is politically subdivided into 18 barangays. Each barangay consists of puroks and some have sitios.

- A-et
- Abucay (Poblacion)
- Baybay (Poblacion)
- Del Remedio (Candaracol)
- Kandalakit
- Loyola Heights (Poblacion)
- Tabi (Poblacion)
- Mabini
- Maglipay
- Maramara (Poblacion)
- Riverside (Poblacion)
- San Francisco
- San Isidro (Maytigbao)
- San Juan
- San Mateo
- San Vicente (Puro/Catalab-an)
- Santo Niño
- Santo Tomas (Pagnas)

=== Climate ===
Climate data for Sulat, Eastern Samar
Month	Jan	Feb	Mar	Apr	May	Jun	Jul	Aug	Sep	Oct	Nov	Dec	Year
Mean daily maximum °C (°F)	27 (81)	28 (82)	28 (82)	30 (86)	30 (86)	30 (86)	29 (84)	29 (84)	29 (84)	29 (84)	28 (82)	28 (82)	29 (84)
Mean daily minimum °C (°F)	22 (72)	22 (72)	22 (72)	23 (73)	24 (75)	24 (75)	24 (75)	24 (75)	24 (75)	24 (75)	23 (73)	23 (73)	23 (74)
Average precipitation mm (inches)	114 (4.5)	81 (3.2)	94 (3.7)	81 (3.2)	119 (4.7)	192 (7.6)	186 (7.3)	158 (6.2)	167 (6.6)	185 (7.3)	202 (8.0)	176 (6.9)	1,755 (69.2)
Average rainy days	18.6	14.7	16.8	17.8	22.3	25.9	27.5	26.2	26.6	27.0	24.6	22.3	270.3
Source: Meteoblue

== Demographics ==
Population census of Sulat
Year	Pop.	±% p.a.
1903	5,266	—
1918	6,331	+1.24%
1939	8,004	+1.12%
1948	8,642	+0.86%
1960	9,927	+1.16%
1970	11,535	+1.51%
1975	12,226	+1.17%
1980	12,357	+0.21%
1990	12,738	+0.30%
1995	14,010	+1.80%
2000	14,193	+0.28%
2007	19,322	+4.35%
2010	15,184	−8.40%
2015	15,377	+0.24%
2020	15,758	+0.52%
2024	15,776	+0.03%
Source: Philippine Statistics Authority

The population of Sulat in the 2024 census was 15,776 people, with a density of 93 inhabitants per square kilometre or 240 inhabitants per square mile.

== Economy ==
Poverty incidence of Sulat (%)

Source: Philippine Statistics Authority

== Tourism ==
Sulat River
Sulat River possesses beautiful sceneries of the sunrise and sunset with water flowing in from the Pacific Ocean. The river is primarily used by native fishing boats and passenger boats making trips to nearby islands.

Luyang Beach
Luyang Beach has patches of corals in ancient underwater limestone formations with a wide variety of tropical aquatic life along the Pacific coast.

Makati Island
Makati Island has a pristine white sand beach and seasonal waves for surfers and skimboarders. The island has accommodation for visitors to stay overnight and is being considered by the Department of Tourism for further development.

Panini-hian Sunrise View Pacific Resort
Panini-hian Sunrise View Pacific Resort is within walking distance of Luyang Beach. Cottages for rent are available in the resort under the supervision of the Local Government Unit. Further development is ongoing.

Podpod
A traditional Waray fishcake dish prevalent in Barangay Santa Vicente. The fishcake is made by first boiling fish with water and salt. Once cooked, the fish meat is separated from the stock and its bones. The meat is then squeezed so take out the liquid. Afterwards, the fish meat is packed into bamboo shapers until the fish meat is flat and in circular shape. The fishmeat is then taken out from the mold and smoked. The podpod can be eaten as it is or used in the od'ong, a traditional Waray soup and noodle dish.

== Education ==
=== Secondary schools ===
- Sulat National High School
- Santo Niño National High School
- San Vicente Integrated School
- MSH Loyola Academy

=== Elementary schools ===
- A-et Elementary School
- San Francisco Elementary School
- Maglipay Elementary School
- Kandalakit Elementary School
- Del Remedio Elementary School
- Mabini Elementary School
- San Juan Elementary School
- San Mateo Elementary School
- San Vicente Elementary School
- Santo Niño Elementary School
- Hamorawon PS
- Sulat CES
- San Isidro Elementary School
- Santo Tomas Elementary School

== Notable people ==
- Ben Evardone - Filipino politician, representative, Governor of Eastern Samar
- RV Evardone - Eastern Samar Philippine Councilors League president, Governor-Elect of Eastern Samar
