= Eastern Samar's at-large congressional district =

Legislative district of the Philippines

- Constituency for the House of Representatives of the Philippines
- Location of Eastern Samar within the Philippines
- Province: Eastern Samar
- Region: Eastern Visayas
- Population: 477,168 (2020)
- Electorate: 359,570 (2025)
- Area: 4,660.47 km^{2} (1,799.42 sq mi)

Current constituency
- Created: 1965
- Representative: Sheen Gonzales
- Political party: NUP
- Congressional bloc: Minority

Eastern Samar's at-large congressional district is the sole congressional district of the Philippines in the province of Eastern Samar. Also known as Eastern Samar's lone district, it has been represented in the House of Representatives of the Philippines since 1965. It first elected a representative provincewide at-large for the 6th Congress of the Third Philippine Republic under the old configuration of Samar's 3rd congressional district in 1965 and automatically transitioned into this district once the concurrent Samar division plebiscite officially ratified Republic Act No. 4221. It has remained a single-member district for the House of Representatives as well as the Fourth Philippine Republic parliament known as the Regular Batasang Pambansa from 1984 to 1986.

The district is currently represented in the 20th Congress by Sheen Gonzales of the National Unity Party (NUP).

== Representation history ==
#	Image	Member	Term of office		Congress	Party	Electoral history
#	Image	Member	Start	End	Congress	Party	Electoral history
=== Eastern Samar's at-large district for the House of Representatives of the Philippines ===
District created June 19, 1965.
1		Felipe J. Abrigo	December 30, 1965	September 23, 1972	6th	Liberal	Redistricted from Samar's 3rd district and re-elected in 1965.
1		Felipe J. Abrigo	December 30, 1965	September 23, 1972	7th	Nacionalista	Re-elected in 1969. Removed from office after imposition of martial law.
District dissolved into the ten-seat Region VIII's at-large district for the Interim Batasang Pambansa.
#	Image	Member	Term of office		Batasang Pambansa	Party	Electoral history
#	Image	Member	Start	End	Batasang Pambansa	Party	Electoral history
=== Eastern Samar's at-large district for the Regular Batasang Pambansa ===
District re-created February 1, 1984.
2		Vicente O. Valley	July 23, 1984	March 25, 1986	2nd	KBL	Elected in 1984.
#	Image	Member	Term of office		Congress	Party	Electoral history
#	Image	Member	Start	End	Congress	Party	Electoral history
=== Eastern Samar's at-large district for the House of Representatives of the Philippines ===
District re-created February 2, 1987.
3		Jose Tan Ramirez	June 30, 1987	June 30, 1998	8th	Liberal	Elected in 1987.
3		Jose Tan Ramirez	June 30, 1987	June 30, 1998	9th	Lakas	Re-elected in 1992.
3		Jose Tan Ramirez	June 30, 1987	June 30, 1998	10th	Lakas	Re-elected in 1995.
4		Marcelino C. Libanan	June 30, 1998	April 18, 2007	11th	LAMMP	Elected in 1998.
4		Marcelino C. Libanan	June 30, 1998	April 18, 2007	12th	NPC	Re-elected in 2001.
4		Marcelino C. Libanan	June 30, 1998	April 18, 2007	13th	Lakas	Re-elected in 2004. Resigned on appointment as Bureau of Immigration commissioner.
-		vacant	April 18, 2007	June 30, 2007	13th		No special election held to fill vacancy.
5		Teodulo M. Coquilla	June 30, 2007	June 30, 2010	14th	Lakas	Elected in 2007.
5		Teodulo M. Coquilla	June 30, 2007	June 30, 2010	14th	Independent	Elected in 2007.
6		Ben P. Evardone	June 30, 2010	June 30, 2019	15th	Liberal	Elected in 2010.
6		Ben P. Evardone	June 30, 2010	June 30, 2019	16th	Liberal	Re-elected in 2013.
6		Ben P. Evardone	June 30, 2010	June 30, 2019	17th	PDP–Laban	Re-elected in 2016.
7		Maria Fe R. Abunda	June 30, 2019	June 30, 2025	18th	Liberal	Elected in 2019.
7		Maria Fe R. Abunda	June 30, 2019	June 30, 2025	19th	PDP–Laban	Re-elected in 2022.
7		Maria Fe R. Abunda	June 30, 2019	June 30, 2025	19th	Lakas	Re-elected in 2022.
8		Sheen Gonzales	June 30, 2025	Incumbent	20th	Independent	Elected in 2025.
8		Sheen Gonzales	June 30, 2025	Incumbent	20th	NUP	Elected in 2025.

== Election results ==
=== 2025 ===
Candidate	Party	Votes	%
Sheen Gonzales	Independent	180,393	61.22
Maria Fe Abunda (incumbent)	Lakas–CMD	108,778	36.92
Arnold Azura	Independent	5,481	1.86
Total		294,652	100.00
Valid votes		294,652	95.18
Invalid/blank votes		14,927	4.82
Total votes		309,579	100.00
Registered voters/turnout		359,570	86.10
Independent gain from Lakas–CMD			
Source: Commission on Elections

=== 2022 ===
2022 Philippine House of Representatives elections
Party	Candidate	Votes	%
PDP–Laban	Maria Fe Abunda (incumbent)	219,583	
Independent	Febida Padel	12,592	
Total votes			100.00%
PDP–Laban hold			

=== 2019 ===
2019 Philippine House of Representatives elections
Party	Candidate	Votes	%
Liberal	Maria Fe Abunda	95,208	
Nacionalista	Sheen Gonzales	88,008	
NPC	Conrado Nicart III	46,164	
PFP	Shaudy Gonzales	1,875	
PDDS	Febida Padel	921	
Total votes			100.00%
Liberal gain from PDP–Laban			

=== 2016 ===
2016 Philippine House of Representatives elections
Party	Candidate	Votes	%
Liberal	Ben Evardone (incumbent)	132,089	58.32%
Nacionalista	Annaliz Gonzales-Kwan	94,388	41.68%
Valid ballots		226,477	88.32%
Margin of victory		37,701	16.65%
Invalid or blank votes		29,959	11.68%
Total votes		256,436	100.00%
Liberal hold			

=== 2013 ===
2013 Philippine House of Representatives elections
Party	Candidate	Votes	%
Liberal	Ben Evardone (incumbent)	79,083	47.16
Nacionalista	Annaliza Gonzales-Kwan	75,131	44.81
Independent	Febidal Fadel	402	0.24
Margin of victory		3,952	2.36%
Invalid or blank votes		13,060	7.79
Total votes		167,676	100.00
Liberal hold			

=== 2010 ===
2010 Philippine House of Representatives elections
Party	Candidate	Votes	%
Independent	Ben Evardone	74,082	38.07
Independent	Teodulo Coquilla (incumbent)	66,222	34.03
NPC	Raymond Apita	25,932	13.33
PMP	Mateo Biong, Jr.	17,682	9.09
Nacionalista	Maximo Aljibe	9,108	4.68
Independent	Conrado Macasa, Sr.	806	0.41
Independent	Angelo Miguel	577	0.30
PGRP	Febidal Padel	193	0.10
Valid ballots		194,602	91.05
Invalid or blank votes		19,137	8.95
Total votes		213,739	100.00
Independent hold			

== See also ==
- Legislative district of Eastern Samar
