= RV Evardone =

Filipino politician

Ralph Vincent Maniago Evardone
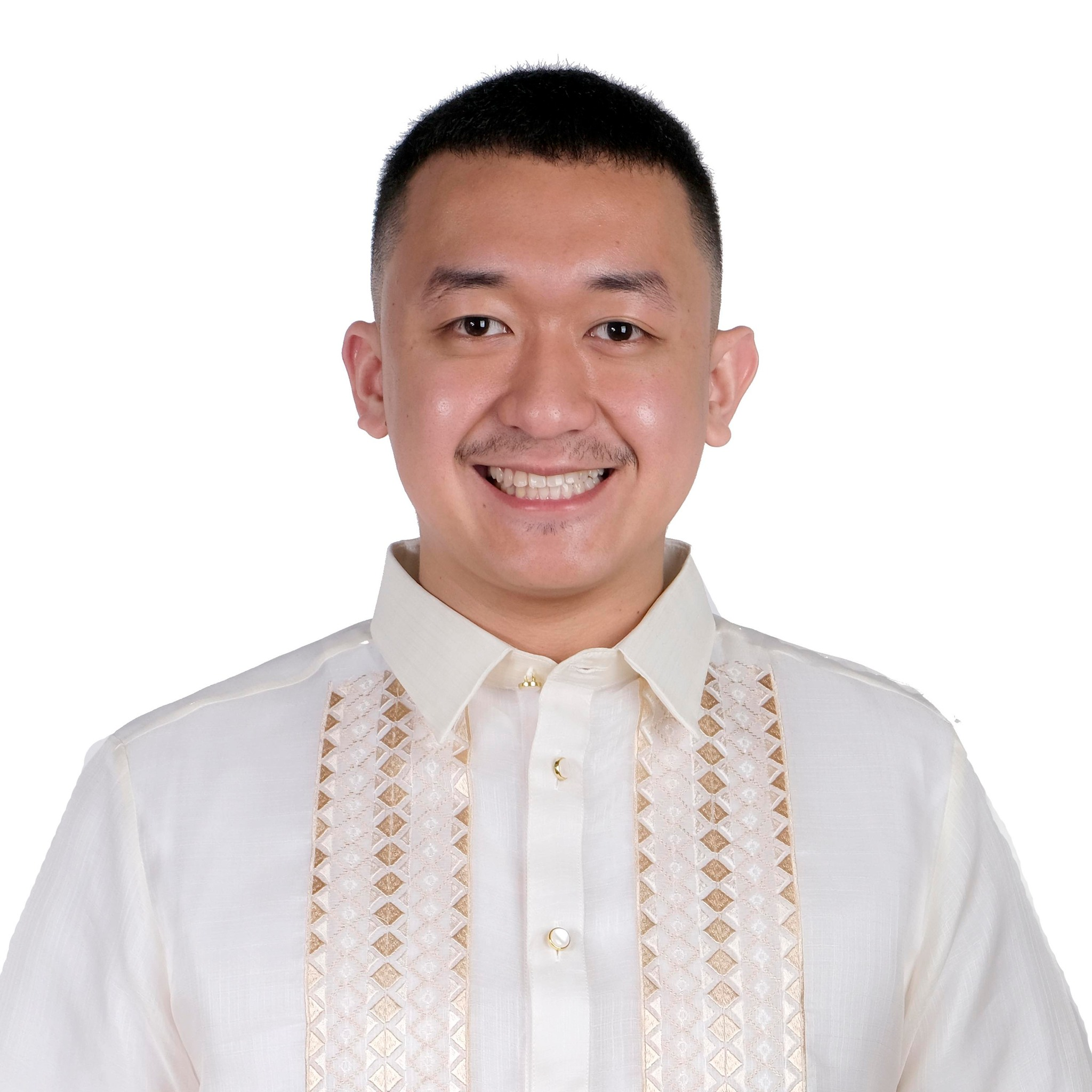
- Official portrait, 2025

10th Governor of Eastern Samar
- Incumbent
- Assumed office June 30, 2025
- Vice Governor: Maricar Sison
- Preceded by: Ben Evardone

President of the Eastern Samar Chapter of the Philippine Councilors League
- In office June 30, 2022 – June 30, 2025

Councilor of Sulat, Eastern Samar
- In office June 30, 2022 – June 30, 2025

Personal details
- Born: Ralph Vincent Maniago Evardone; February 24, 2000 (age 26) Quezon City, Metro Manila, Philippines
- Party: PFP (2024–present)
- Other political affiliations: PDP–Laban (2021–2024)
- Parent: Ben Evardone (father)
- Occupation: Politician
- Profession: Economist

Ralph Vincent Maniago Evardone (born February 14, 2000) is a Filipino politician who is the governor of Eastern Samar since 2025. He previously served as a member of the Eastern Samar Provincial Board. He is the son of former governor Ben Evardone.

== Early life and education ==
Ralph Vincent Maniago Evardone was born on February 14, 2000, in Quezon City, Metro Manila. He had his elementary in the Ateneo de Manila Grade School. He was a former basketball varsity player during his days in the Ateneo, playing under multiple leagues. He also graduated in Ateneo De Manila University under the School of Management's program, Bachelor of Arts in Management Economics. He is the son of former Eastern Samar governor Ben Evardone.

== Political career ==
=== Sangguniang Panlalawigan/Councilor ===
Evardone ran for councilor of Sulat under Partido Demokratiko Pilipino. In the elections, he gained 8,119 votes, 77.01 percent of the votes. Due to this, he gained 1st place. He was the president of the Eastern Samar chapter of the Philippine Councilors League. Due to this, he became a board member. On July 4, 2024, he teamed up with the Philippine Daily Inquirer and Department of Education, making a program named "INQskwela".

=== 2025 gubernatorial bid ===
On October 8, 2024, incumbent Governor Ben Evardone withdrew his candidacy for governor in the 2025 elections. RV had filed his candidacy as a councilor of Sulat. Instead, Ralph Vincent substituted Ben, making him a candidate in the elections. Their campaign was named "Solido para Progreso" (transl. Solid for progress).

On April 30, 2025, Jipapad vice mayoral candidate Noel Montalla said that Evardone was "prematurely born at seven months". After, COMELEC told Montalla to explain his "abnormal remarks".

On May 1, a barangay leader for Evardone's campaign was murdered.

In the election, Evardone gained 204,165 votes, 56.78 percent of the votes under the Partido Federal ng Pilipinas party, defeating Alliance for Barangay Concerns candidate Raffy Asebias. He was inaugurated as governor on June 30, 2025.

== Electoral history ==
Electoral history of RV Evardone
Year	Office	Party	Votes received				Result
Year	Office	Party	Total	%	P.	Swing	Result
2022	Councilor of Sulat	PDP–Laban	8,119	77.01%	1st	—N/a	Won
2025	Governor of Eastern Samar	PFP	204,564	72.61%	1st	—N/a	Won
