= Maria Fe Abunda =

Filipino politician

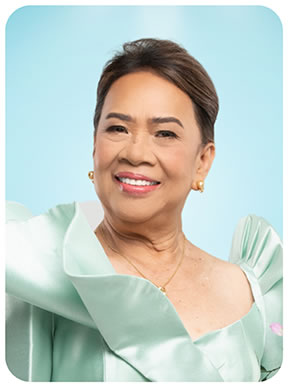
- Official portrait, 2022

Member of the Philippine House of Representatives from Eastern Samar's Lone District
- In office June 30, 2019 – June 30, 2025
- Preceded by: Ben Evardone
- Succeeded by: Sheen Gonzales

Mayor of Borongan
- In office June 30, 2010 – June 30, 2019
- Preceded by: Fidel V. Anacta
- Succeeded by: Jose Ivan Dayan Agda

Personal details
- Born: Maria Fe Romerica Abunda; November 3, 1957 (age 68) Borongan, Samar, Philippines
- Party: Lakas (2023–present)
- Other political affiliations: PDP–Laban (2021–2023); Liberal (2012–2021)
- Relatives: Boy Abunda (brother)
- Profession: Politician

Maria Fe Romerica Abunda (Tagalog pronunciation: [ʔaˈbʊnda]; born November 8, 1957) is a Filipino politician. She served as a member of the Philippine House of Representatives representing Eastern Samar's Lone District from 2019 to 2025. She served as the mayor of Borongan from 2010 to 2019. She became the first woman to be elected as Eastern Samar representative. She is the sister of television host Boy Abunda.

== Political career ==
=== Mayor of Borongan (2010–2019) ===
Abunda became the Mayor of Borongan, the capital city of the province of Eastern Samar, from 2010 to 2019. During her mayoral tenure, she received criticism regarding her affiliations with political parties.

=== House of Representatives (2019–2025) ===
Having been elected in 2019, Abunda represented Eastern Samar's Lone District. She was re-elected in 2022 but lost re-election in 2025 to Guiuan Mayor Sheen Gonzales. While in Congress, she authored and co-authored several House bills and republic acts.

=== Other appointments (2022–2025) ===
- Vice-Chairman, Committee on Basic Education And Culture
- Vice-Chairman, Committee on Higher And Technical Education
- Vice-Chairman, Committee on Poverty Alleviation
- Member, Committee on Foreign Affairs
- Member, Committee on Health
- Member, Committee on Social Services
- Member, Committee on Tourism
- Member, Committee on Trade And Industry
- Member, Committee on Visayas Development
- Member, Committee on Women And Gender Equality

House of Representatives of the Philippines
Preceded by Ben Evardone	Member of the House of Representatives from Eastern Samar's at-large district 2019–2025	Succeeded by Sheen Gonzales
