= Sheen Gonzales =

Filipino politician

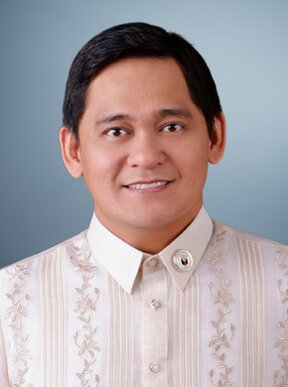
- Official portrait, 2026

Member of the Philippine House of Representatives from Eastern Samar's lone district
- Incumbent
- Assumed office June 30, 2025
- Preceded by: Maria Fe Abunda

Assistant Minority Floor Leader
- Incumbent
- Assumed office July 30, 2025
- Leader: Marcelino Libanan

Mayor of Guiuan
- In office June 30, 2013 – June 30, 2019
- Preceded by: Annaliza Kwan
- Succeeded by: Annaliza Kwan

Personal details
- Born: Christopher Sheen Projemo Gonzales; May 7, 1980 (age 46) Guiuan, Eastern Samar, Philippines
- Party: NUP (2026–present)
- Other political affiliations: Independent (2024–2026); Nacionalista (2012–2024)
- Occupation: Politician

Christopher Sheen Projemo Gonzales (born May 7, 1980) is a Filipino politician who has served as the representative for Eastern Samar's lone district since 2025. He previously served as the mayor of Guiuan from 2013 to 2019, overseeing the municipality's response to Typhoon Haiyan, which mostly positive reception from government agencies, drawing praise from President Benigno Aquino III but probe from the Commission on Audit.

== Early life ==
Gonzales was born in Guiuan, Eastern Samar, on May 7, 1980.

== Mayor of Guiuan (2013–2019) ==
Gonzales was elected as mayor of Guiuan in 2013. During his tenure, Typhoon Haiyan struck Guiuan. During a state visit to the country, French President François Hollande noted the scale of destruction in the municipality as an effect of climate change and cited its experiences at the 2015 United Nations Climate Change Conference.

Gonzales led the recovery efforts of the typhoon, which received mixed responses from government agencies. President Benigno Aquino III praised him for his preparedness, deeming him as a standard for chief executives. Meanwhile, the Commission on Audit scrutinized his administration's solid waste management. On February 28, 2019, Gonzales was ordered to be suspended by the Office of the Ombudsman after he was politically implicated for the fund for Typhoon Haiyan. Contrary to the findings of state auditors, Guiuan submitted a report on how it spent its local disaster funds and a certification letter from COA showing that the local government unit had already complied with its reporting requirements for 2014. Furthermore, Gonzales replied by stating that the suspension order was "political harassment".

Despite Gonzales' suspension, under his tenure, Guiuan was awarded the Seal of Good Financial Housekeeping from the Department of Interior and Local Government from 2014–2019. Furthermore, in 2017, the DILG stated that among Eastern Visayas' 143 towns, only 23 qualified for the award including Guiuan.

Gonzales ran under the Nacionalista Party for his second term as mayor, winning with 18,024 votes.

== House of Representatives (since 2025) ==
=== Elections ===
==== 2019 ====
Gonzales ran under the Nacionalista Party in the 2019 Philippine House of Representatives elections. Gonzales gained second place in the elections with 86,330 votes and was beaten by then-Borongan mayor Maria Fe Abunda.

==== 2025 ====
In late 2024, 19 mayors expressed disdain and disappointment towards Abunda, pushing Gonzales to lead them and run for representative instead. On October 8, 2024, Gonzales filed his certificate of candidacy for representative as an independent candidate. He was endorsed by the Partido Federal ng Pilipinas, the party of President Bongbong Marcos. Gonzales won the election by a landslide, beating the incumbent Abunda. He gained 177,413 votes, 49.34 percent of the votes.

=== Tenure ===
Gonzales took office on June 30, 2025. As representative, he proposed bills on agriculture and fisheries including the "Act establishing a Coconut Oil Milling and Refinery Plant in Quinapondan" and for the establishment of fishing ports in Dolores and Oras, Eastern Samar. He has also proposed several bills directed towards education, establishing accessible public college institutions in Balangiga and Arteche and increasing public school teachers' incentive pay.. Furthermore, he is a principal author of bills that aims to strengthen basic education curriculum and build classrooms in underserved and conflict-ridden areas of the country.

As co-author, Gonzales has worked on a bill to create a college of medicine in the public Eastern Samar State University system in Borongan. He has also co-authored bills aimed at optimizing carbon projects and lowering footprints in the economy as well as increasing conditional cash grants by the 4Ps program of the country. Furthermore, Gonzales has authored a resolution directing the appropriate committees of the House of Representatives to conduct a comprehensive investigation, in aid of legislation, into the environmental, social, and economic impacts of mining operations on Homonhon Island, Guiuan, Eastern Samar, with the end in view of ensuring responsible resource management, protecting the rights and welfare of local communities, and preserving the island’s historical and ecological integrity.

== Personal life ==
Gonzales is youngest of eight siblings and the brother of incumbent Guiuan mayor Annaliza Gonzales-Kwan. He is the son-in-law of House Minority Leader Marcelino Libanan.

House of Representatives of the Philippines
Preceded by Maria Fe Abunda	Member of the House of Representatives from Eastern Samar's at-large district 2025–present	Incumbent
