= Governor of Eastern Samar =

Local chief executive

- Gobernador ng Silangang Samar
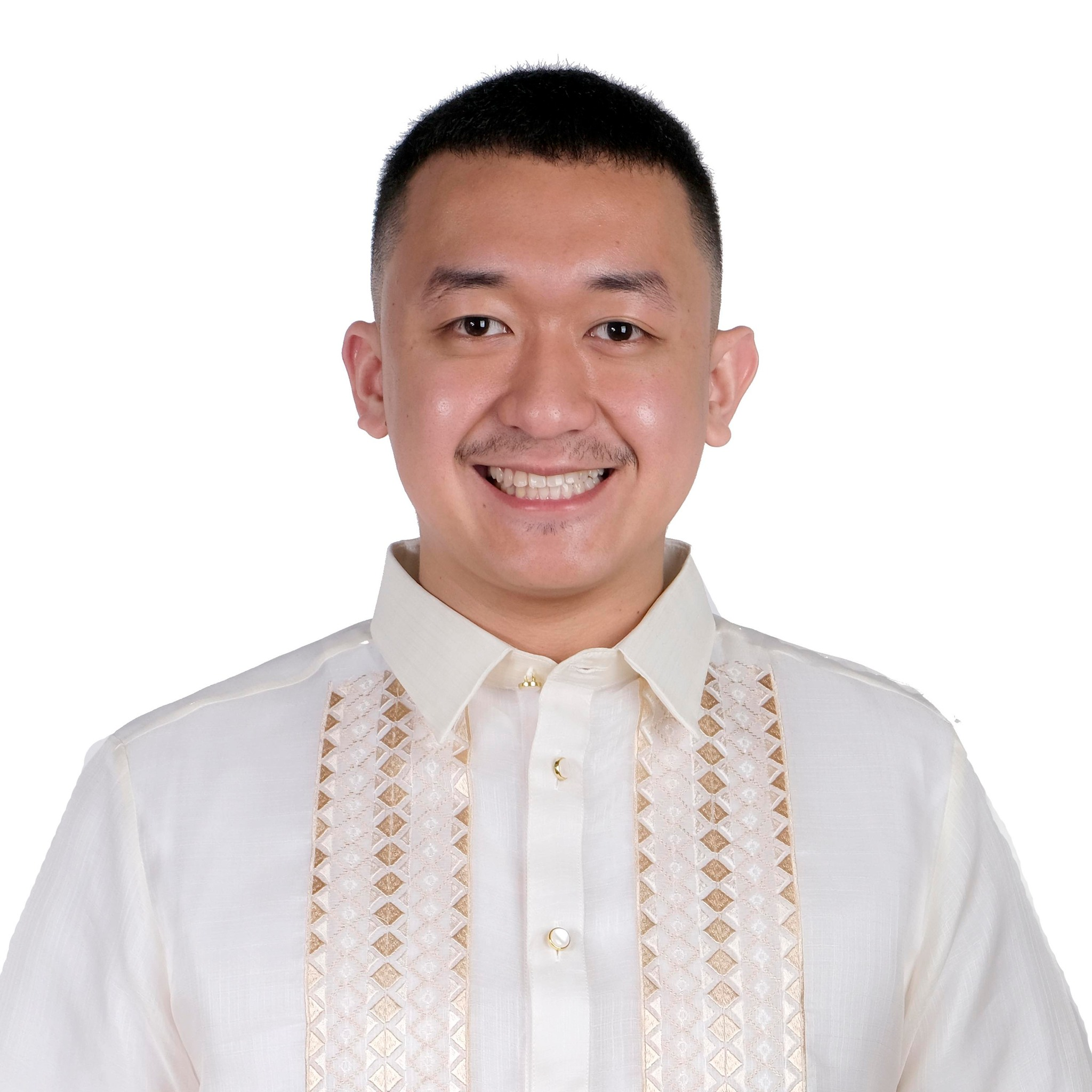
- Incumbent; RV Evardone since June 30, 2025
- Style: The Honorable
- Seat: Eastern Samar Provincial Capitol, Borongan
- Term length: 3 years, renewable maximum not eligible for re-election immediately after three consecutive terms
- Inaugural holder: Victor Amasa
- Formation: June 1, 1968
- Deputy: Vice Governor

The governor of Eastern Samar is the local chief executive and head of the Provincial Government of Eastern Samar in the Philippines. Along with the governors of Biliran, Leyte, Northern Samar, Samar, and Southern Leyte, the province's chief executive is a member of the Regional Development Council of the Eastern Visayas Region.

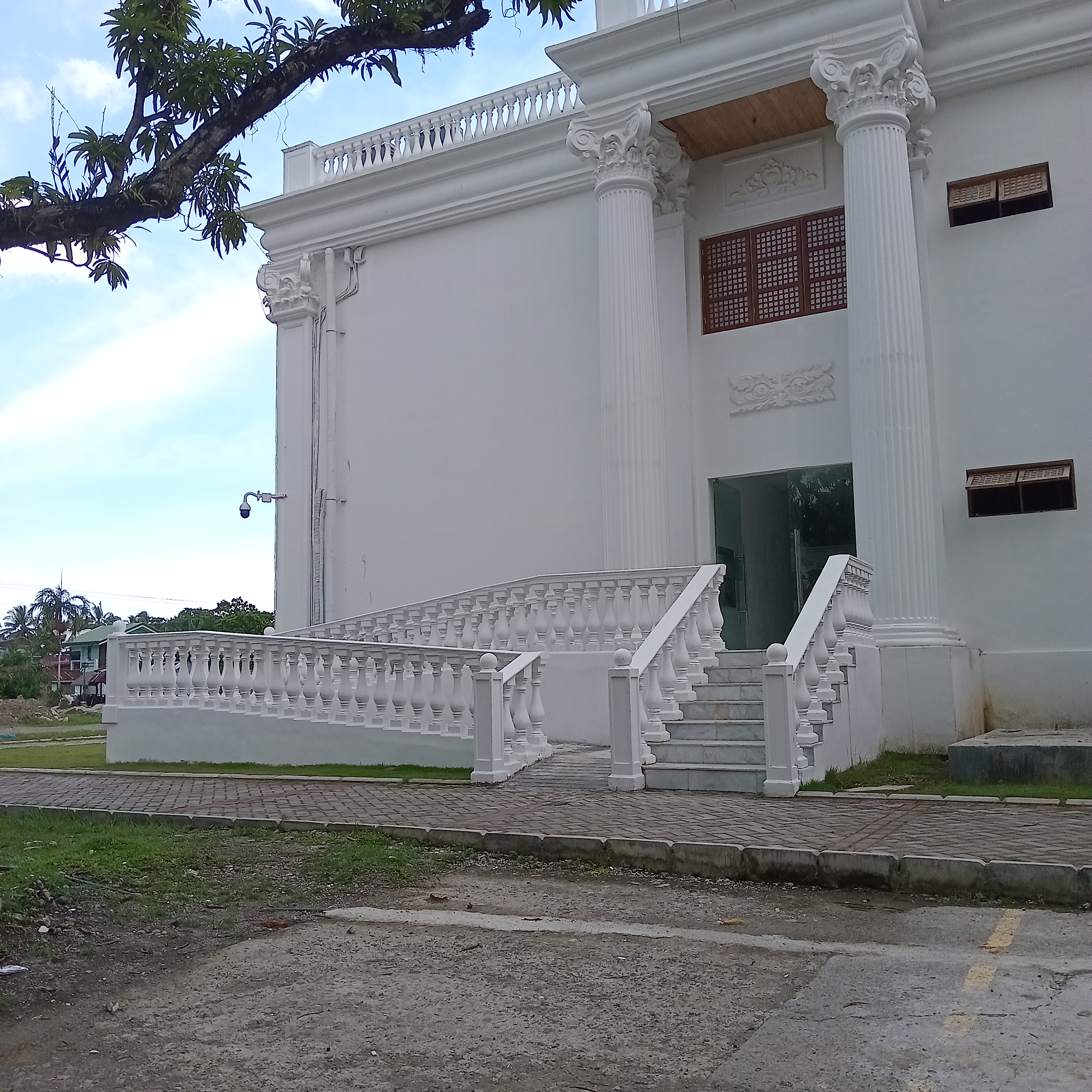
The Seat of the Governor of Eastern Samar

== List of governors of Eastern Samar ==
Governors of Eastern Samar

1. THIRD PHILIPPINE REPUBLIC (1960–1980)
| No. | Name | Term | Origin | Note(s) |
|---|---|---|---|---|
| 1 | Victor Amasa | January 1, 1968 - June 30, 1980 | Borongan | First elected governor. Elected twice. Former mayor of Borongan. |

2. FOURTH PHILIPPINE REPUBLIC (1980–1986)
| No. | Name | Term | Origin | Note(s) |
|---|---|---|---|---|
| 2 | Frederico Oraya Mengote | June 30, 1980 - March 15, 1986 | Oras | Elected twice. |

3. FIFTH PHILIPPINE REPUBLIC (1986–present)
| No. | Image | Name | Term | Origin | Note(s) |
|---|---|---|---|---|---|
| 3 | | Lutgardo Barbo | March 16, 1986 - June 30, 1988 | Borongan | Appointed by President Corazon C. Aquino. |
| 3 | | Lutgardo Barbo | June 30, 1988 - June 30, 1998 | Borongan | Elected in 3 consecutive terms |
| 4 | | Ruperto A. Ambil Jr. | June 30, 1998 - June 30, 2001 | Borongan | Elected. |
| 5 | | Clotilde Hilaria Japzon-Salazar | June 30, 2001- June 30, 2004 | Gen. MacArthur | First female elected governor. |
| 6 | | Ben Evardone | June 30, 2004 - June 30, 2010 | Sulat | Elected twice. |
| 7 | | Conrado B. Nicart Jr. | June 30, 2010 - August 24, 2017 | San Policarpo | Elected in 3 consecutive terms. Died while in office. |
| 8 | | Marcelo Ferdinand A. Picardal | August 25, 2017 - April 16, 2019 | Borongan | Acting governor, in lieu of the incumbent, who took medical leave. |
| 8 | | Marcelo Ferdinand A. Picardal | April 17, 2019 - June 30, 2019 | Borongan | Succeeded after the death of the incumbent. |
| 9 | | Ben Evardone | June 30, 2019 - June 30, 2025 | Sulat | Elected twice. Longest serving governor. |
| 10 | | RV Evardone | June 30, 2025- present | Sulat | Elected. |
