= Ben Evardone =

Filipino governor and politician

Governor of Eastern Samar
- In office June 30, 2019 – June 30, 2025
- Vice Governor: Maricar Sison
- Preceded by: Marcelo Ferdinand Picardal
- Succeeded by: RV Evardone
- In office June 30, 2004 – June 30, 2010
- Preceded by: Clotilde Hilaria Japzon-Salazar
- Succeeded by: Conrado Nicart Jr.

Member of the Philippine House of Representatives from Eastern Samar's at-large congressional district
- In office June 30, 2010 – June 30, 2019
- Preceded by: Teodulo Coquila
- Succeeded by: Maria Fe Abunda

Personal details
- Born: Ben Pagaran Evardone; September 30, 1963 (age 63) Sulat, Samar
- Party: PFP (2024–present)
- Other political affiliations: PDP–Laban (2016–2024); Liberal (2010–2016); Independent (2009–2010); Lakas (2007–2009); LDP (1995–2007)
- Relations: RV Evardone (child)
- Occupation: Politician

Ben Pagaran Evardone (born September 30, 1963) was the governor of Eastern Samar, Philippines and was the Congressman of Eastern Samar; he was born in Sulat, Eastern Samar (then part of undivided Samar), on September 30, 1963.

== Early life ==
Ben Pagaran Evardone was born on September 30, 1963. Evardone was a former journalist who covered the final years of the Marcos dictatorship. He was also the student council president for the University of the East in 1983.

== Political career ==
=== First installation as Governor of Eastern Samar (2004-2010) ===
Evardone served as the governor of Eastern Samar from 2004 to 2010 through two terms: from 2004 to 2007 and from 2007 to 2010. He was an ally of President Gloria Macapagal Arroyo, supporting the idea of the establishment of a regional government if she were ousted and replaced with a junta.

=== Eastern Samar Representative (2010-2019) ===
Evardone, along with Walden Bello, Kaka Bag-ao, Teddy Baguilat, and 20 members of the press, left Manila through two commercial planes to Palawan to pick up a few passengers. They then went to Thitu Island, the planes being the first to land there and the first congregational delegation to visit the island.

=== Second installation as Governor of Eastern Samar (2022-2025) ===
Evardone ran for governor in 2022; he also actively voiced his support for then-vice president Leni Robredo's presidential campaign. He got elected as Governor of Eastern Samar. He was also the longest-serving governor and he was the vice president of PDP–Laban for the Visayas. In 2024, Evardone withdrew his candidacy for reelection in the 2025 Philippine general election and was replaced by his son, RV Evardone, who won the election.

== Personal life ==
Evardone is married to Grace Maniago.

== Electoral history ==
Electoral history of Ben Evardone
Year	Office	Party	Votes received				Result
Year	Office	Party	Total	%	P.	Swing	Result
2004	Governor of Eastern Samar	LDP	75,445	50.20%	1st	—N/a	Won
2007	Governor of Eastern Samar	Lakas–CMD	122,467	84.18%	1st	+33.98	Won
2019	Governor of Eastern Samar	PDP–Laban	127,857	56.36%	1st	-27.82	Won
2022	Governor of Eastern Samar	PDP–Laban	211,554	88.52%	1st	+32.16	Won
1995	Representative (Eastern Samar)	LDP	27,888	25.89%	3rd	—N/a	Lost
2010	Representative (Eastern Samar)	IND	74,082	38.07%	1st	+12.18	Won
2013	Representative (Eastern Samar)	Liberal	79,083	47.16%	1st	+9.09	Won
2016	Representative (Eastern Samar)	Liberal	132,089	58.32%	1st	+11.16	Won
