= Legislative districts of Samar =

Congressional districts of Samar

The legislative districts of Samar are the representations of the province of Samar in the various national legislatures of the Philippines. The province is currently represented in the lower house of the Congress of the Philippines through its first and second congressional districts.

== History ==
The former province of Samar was divided into three legislative districts from 1907 until 1965.

Its division into three different provinces was only approved in a plebiscite held together with the general elections on November 19, 1965, as mandated by Republic Act No. 4221, which meant that voters still elected representatives under the old district configuration. After the ratification of RA 4221 the representatives of the second and third districts automatically served as the representatives of the lone districts of Western Samar and Eastern Samar, respectively, while the representative of the first district only served until 1967, when special elections were held to determine the new representative for Northern Samar. In 1969 Western Samar was renamed, and it is just this portion of the original undivided province that now assumes the title Samar.

Samar was part of the representation of Region VIII from 1978 to 1984, and from 1984 to 1986 it elected 2 assemblymen at-large. In 1986 it was redistricted into two legislative districts.

== Current districts ==
Western Samar's current congressional delegation is composed of two members.

Nacionalista (1)
Lakas–CMD (1)

Legislative districts and representatives of Western Samar
District	Current Representative		Party	Constituent LGUs	Population (2020)	Area	Map
District	Image	Name	Party	Constituent LGUs	Population (2020)	Area	Map
1st		Stephen James Tan (since 2022); Calbayog	Nacionalista	List: Almagro; Calbayog; Gandara; Matuguinao; Pagsanghan; San Jorge; Santa Margarita; Santo Niño; Tagapul-an; Tarangnan	338,230	2,269.14 km²	
2nd		Reynolds Michael T. Tan (since 2022); Catbalogan	Lakas–CMD	List: Basey; Calbiga; Catbalogan; Daram; Hinabangan; Jiabong; Marabut; Motiong; Paranas; Pinabacdao; San Jose de Buan; San Sebastian; Santa Rita; Talalora; Villareal; Zumarraga	454,953	3,778.89 km²	

== Historical districts ==
=== 3rd District (defunct) ===
- Municipalities: Balangiga, Borongan, Dolores, Guiuan, Llorente, Oras, San Julian, Sulat, Taft, Salcedo (re-established 1908), Hernani (re-established 1912), Quinapondan (re-established 1946), General MacArthur (established 1947), Mercedes (established 1948), Can-avid (established 1948), San Policarpo (established 1948), Giporlos (established 1949), Arteche (established 1951), Maydolong (established 1951), Balangkayan (established 1959), Lawaan (established 1959), Jipapad (established 1965), Maslog (established as municipal district 1919)

Period	Representative
1st Philippine Legislature; 1907–1909	Eugenio D. Daza
2nd Philippine Legislature; 1909–1912	Eladio Cinco
3rd Philippine Legislature; 1912–1916	Mariano Alde
4th Philippine Legislature; 1916–1919	Jose Lugay Raquel
5th Philippine Legislature; 1919–1922	Jose Lugay Raquel
6th Philippine Legislature; 1922–1925	Iñigo Abenis
7th Philippine Legislature; 1925–1928	Gerardo Morrero
8th Philippine Legislature; 1928–1931	Gregorio B. Abogado
9th Philippine Legislature; 1931–1934	Gerardo Morrero
10th Philippine Legislature; 1934–1935	Gerardo Morrero
1st National Assembly; 1935–1938	Juan L. Bocar
2nd National Assembly; 1938–1941	Juan L. Bocar
1st Commonwealth Congress; 1945	Felix Opimo
1st Congress; 1946–1949	Adriano D. Lomuntad
2nd Congress; 1949–1953	Gregorio B. Abogado
3rd Congress; 1953–1957	Gregorio B. Abogado
4th Congress; 1957–1961	Felipe J. Abrigo (Note: Automatically became representative of the lone district of Eastern Samar upon ratification of Republic Act No. 4221.)
5th Congress; 1961–1965	Felipe J. Abrigo
6th Congress; 1965–1969	Felipe J. Abrigo
6th Congress; 1965–1969	see Lone District of Eastern Samar

=== Lone District (defunct) ===
Period	Representative
6th Congress; 1965–1969	Fernando R. Veloso (Note: Automatically became representative of the lone district of Western Samar upon ratification of Republic Act No. 4221.)
7th Congress; 1969–1972	Fernando R. Veloso

=== At-Large (defunct) ===
==== 1943-1944 ====
Period	Representative
National Assembly; 1943–1944	Cayetano Lucero
National Assembly; 1943–1944	Serafin S. Marabut

==== 1984-1986 ====
Period	Representative
Regular Batasang Pambansa; 1984–1986	Jose A. Roño
Regular Batasang Pambansa; 1984–1986	Fernando R. Veloso

== See also ==
- Legislative district of Eastern Samar
- Legislative district of Northern Samar
