= 2022 Eastern Samar local elections =

Local elections in the Philippines

2022 Eastern Samar gubernatorial election
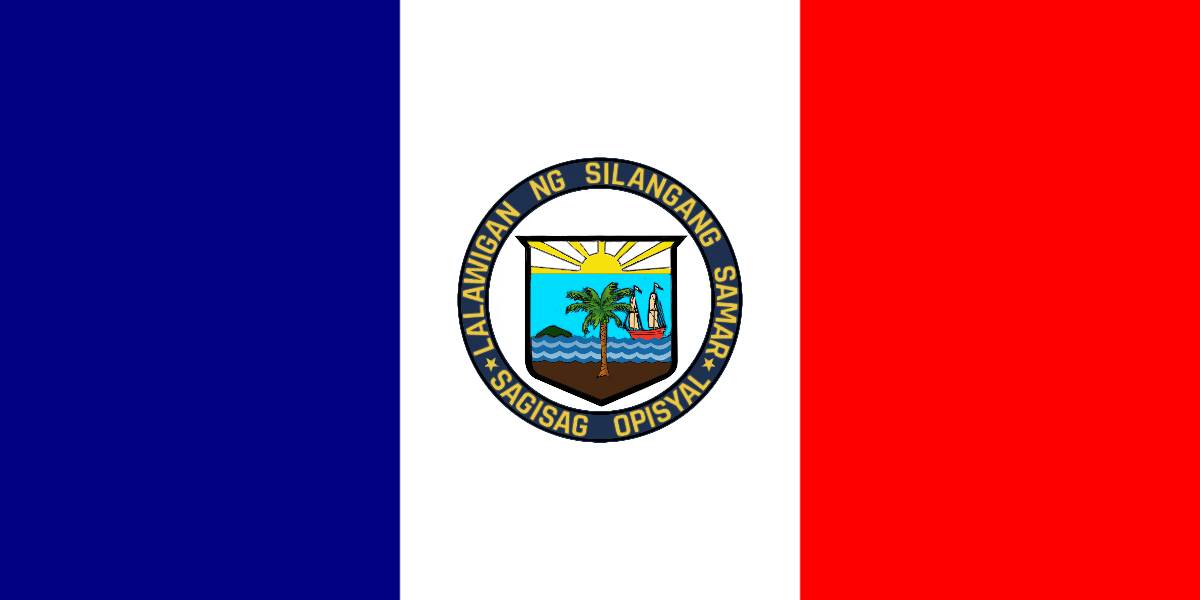
- May 9, 2022
- Registered: 347,616
- Turnout: 84.32%
		PFP	IND
Nominee	Ben Evardone	Petronilo Abuyen Jr.	Bishop Hobayan
Party	PDP–Laban	PFP	Independent
Running mate	Maricar Sison	Jesse Solidon	N/A
Popular vote	211,039	21,440	6,000
Percentage	88.49%	8.99%	2.52%
Governor before election
Ben Evardone
PDP–Laban
Elected Governor
Ben Evardone
PDP–Laban
- 2022 Eastern Samar vice gubernatorial election
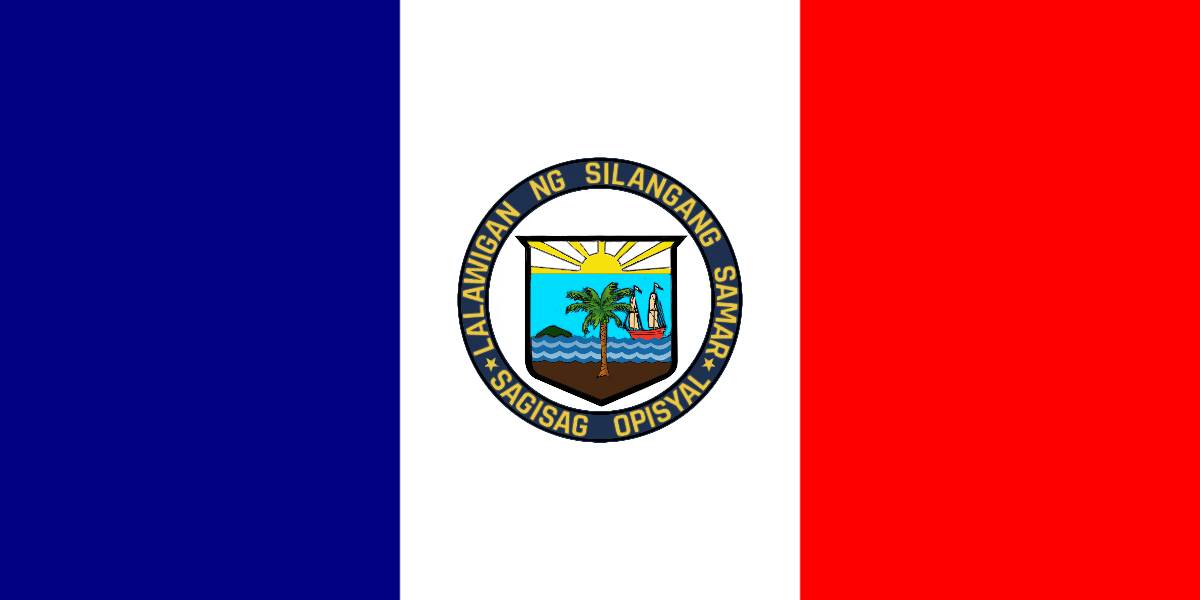
- May 9, 2022
- Registered: 347,616
- Turnout: 84.32%
	PDPLBN	AKSYON	PDDS
Nominee	Maricar Sison	Dindo Picardal	Dado Picardal Jr.
Party	PDP–Laban	Aksyon	PDDS
Popular vote	129,556	87,783	13,392
Percentage	55.25%	37.44%	5.71%
Vice Governor of Eastern Samar before election
Maricar Sison
PDP–Laban
Elected Vice Governor of Eastern Samar
Maricar Sison
PDP–Laban

Local elections were held in Eastern Samar on May 9, 2022, as a part of the 2022 Philippine general election. Eastern Samar is part of the 81 Provinces of the Philippines participating in the elections while having its own local elections. Eastern Samar has two Sangguniang Panlalawigan districts and a lone congressional district.

Incumbent Governor Ben Evardone ran for governor along with Vice Governor Maricar Sison and Congresswoman Maria Fe Abunda. Petronilo Abuyen Jr. from Guiuan ran for governor along with his running mate Jesse Solidon. Former Governor Dindo Picardal ran for vice governor, opposing his relative Dado Picardal Jr. Bishop Hobayan ran independently for Governor. The entire slate of Evardone won for governor, vice governor, and congress.

== Presidential election ==
The main opposition in Eastern Samar were Leni Robredo and Bongbong Marcos. Robredo was supported by multiple mayors and government officials with a caravan and had a rally on March 29. Marcos also had support and had a grand rally in Borongan on April 9. Pacquiao and Moreno also visited Eastern Samar.

In the results, Robredo won in total, gaining 123,868 votes, 45.31 percent of the votes. Marcos gained second place, with 107,415 votes, 39.29 percent.

Party	Candidate	Votes	%
Independent	Leni Robredo	123,868	45.31%
PFP	Bongbong Marcos	107,415	39.29%
PROMDI	Manny Pacquiao	27,365	10.01%
Aksyon	Isko Moreno	8,660	3.17%
Reporma	Panfilo Lacson	2,806	1.03%
Independent	Ernesto Abella	1,112	0.41%
PDSP	Norberto Gonzales	905	0.33%
PLM	Leody de Guzman	683	0.25%
DPP	Jose Montemayor Jr.	361	0.13%
KTPNAN	Faisal Mangondato	190	0.07%
Total Votes		273,365	78.64%
Registered Voters		347,616	

== Gubernatorial and Vice gubernatorial election ==
Incumbent Eastern Samar Governor Ben Evardone filed his certificate of candidacy for governor on October 8 with PDP-Laban with his running mate Maricar Sison. Alongside Evardone, Petronilo Abuyen Jr from Guiuan ran for governor with Partido Federal ng Pilipinas alongside Borongan Councilor Jessie Solidon. Bishop Hobayan ran independently for governor. Two other candidates, Former Governor Dindo Picardal ran for vice governor under Aksyon Demokratiko. Another Picardal, Dado Picardal Jr, ran for vice governor with the Pederalismo ng Dugong Dakilang Samahan party.

=== Gubernatorial ===
Evardone gained the majority of the votes, with 211,039 votes or 88.49 percent. Petronilo Abuyen Jr. gained 21,440 votes or 8.99 percent of the votes. Bishop Hobayan gained 6,000 votes, or 2.52 percent of the votes.

Eastern Samar Gubernatorial Election
Party	Candidate	Votes	%
PDP–Laban	Ben Evardone	211,039	88.49
PFP	Petronilo Abuyen Jr.	21,440	8.99
Independent	Bishop Hobayan	6,000	2.52
Total votes		238,479	100
PDP–Laban hold			

==== Per city/municipality ====
City/Municipality	Ben Evardone		Petronilo Abuyen Jr.		Bishop Hobayan	
City/Municipality	Votes	%	Votes	%	Votes	%
Arteche	7,826	97.16	163	2.02	66	0.82
Balangiga	5,794	84.09	880	12.77	216	3.13
Balangkayan	4,881	89.26	473	8.65	114	2.08
Borongan	31,404	89.42	2,614	7.44	1,102	3.14
Can-avid	10,085	88.43	692	6.07	627	5.50
Dolores	17,153	85.32	2,066	10.28	886	4.41
General MacArthur	6,080	86.83	803	11.47	119	1.70
Giporlos	5,265	76.78	1,498	21.85	94	1.37
Guiuan	24,726	90.73	1,956	7.18	570	2.09
Hernani	3,995	87,00	527	11.48	70	1.52
Jipapad	75,016	71.83	26,741	25.61	1,326	1.27
Lawaan	3,967	91.85	292	6.76	60	1.39
Llorente	8,279	87.63	1,049	11.10	120	1.27
Maslog	2,225	99.02	19	0.85	3	0.13
Maydolong	6,108	81.01	1,213	16.09	219	2.90
Mercedes	3,415	86.11	484	12.20	67	1.69
Oras	15,983	90.28	1,215	6.86	505	2.85
Quinapondan	6,417	87.00	862	11.69	97	1.32
Salcedo	9,883	86.77	1,041	9.35	209	1.88
San Julian	6,516	86.97	817	10.90	159	2.12
San Policarpo	7,944	94.99	302	3.61	117	1.40
Sulat	8,848	95.72	262	2.83	134	1.45
Taft	8,845	88.29	902	9.00	271	2.71
TOTAL	211,039	88.49	21,440	8.99	6,000	2.52

=== Vice gubernatorial ===
Evardone's running mate, Incumbent Vice Governor Maricar Sison, gained half of the votes with 129,556 votes or 55.25 percent. Former Governor Dindo Picardal gained 87,783 votes or 37.44 percent. Dado Picardal Jr. gained 13,392 votes with 5.71 percent of the votes, and Abuyen's running mate, Jesse Solidon, gained 3,759 votes or 1.60 percent of the votes.

Eastern Samar Vice gubernatorial election
Party	Candidate	Votes	%
PDP–Laban	Maricar Sison	129,556	55.25
Aksyon	Dindo Picardal	87,783	37.44
PDDS	Dado Picardal Jr.	13,392	5.71
PFP	Jesse Solidon	3,759	1.60
Total votes		234,490	100
PDP–Laban hold			

==== Per city/municipality ====
City/Municipality	Maricar Sison		Dindo Picardal		Dado Picardal Jr.		Jesse Solidon	
City/Municipality	Votes	%	Votes	%	Votes	%	Votes	%
Arteche	6,414	79.24	1,473	18.20	166	2.05	41	0.51
Balangiga	3,816	57.24	2,236	33.54	530	7.95	85	1.27
Balangkayan	3,149	59.67	1,760	33.35	332	6.29	36	0.68
Borongan	11,748	30.88	22,421	58.94	2,257	5.93	1,616	4.25
Can-avid	5,985	55.80	3,896	36.32	720	6.71	125	1.17
Dolores	9,490	48.47	8,395	42.88	1,417	7.24	277	1.41
General MacArthur	4,620	68.68	1,633	24.28	370	5.50	104	1.55
Giporlos	3,683	59.15	1,891	30.37	531	8.53	122	1.96
Guiuan	21,015	78.12	4,788	17.80	878	3.26	220	0.82
Hernani	2,740	60.29	1,470	32.34	319	7.02	16	0.35
Jipapad	2,029	56.41	1,230	34.20	187	5.20	151	4.20
Lawaan	4,296	63.37	1,922	28.35	519	7.66	42	0.62
Llorente	4,895	52.85	3,795	40.97	522	5.64	50	0.54
Maslog	1,950	94.80	74	3.60	20	0.97	13	0.63
Maydolong	4,040	53.12	2,963	38.96	471	6.19	131	1.72
Mercedes	2,657	68.43	1,005	25.88	194	5.00	27	0.70
Oras	7,402	44.32	8,027	48.06	1,074	6.43	198	1.19
Quinapondan	4,393	62.82	2,060	29.46	469	6.71	71	1.02
Salcedo	7,214	65.62	3,184	28.96	527	4.79	68	0.62
San Julian	3,775	49.38	3,488	45.62	309	4.04	73	0.95
San Policarpo	4,220	52.68	3,294	41.12	433	5.41	63	0.79
Sulat	5,301	61.11	2,872	33.11	407	4.69	94	1.08
Taft	4,724	49.69	3,906	41.09	776	8.16	100	1.05
TOTAL	129,556	55.25	87,783	37.44	13,392	5.71	3,759	1.60

== Congressional election ==
Incumbent congresswoman Maria Fe Abunda ran against independent candidate Febida Padel. In the results, Abunda gained a large majority of the votes, gaining 219,583 votes or 94.58 percent of the votes. Padel gained 12,592 votes or 5.42 percent of the votes.

2022 Philippine House of Representatives election in Eastern Samar's at-large congressional district
Party	Candidate	Votes	%
PDP–Laban	Maria Fe Abunda	219,583	94.58
Independent	Febida Padel	12,592	5.42
Total votes		232,175	100
PDP–Laban hold			

== Sangguniang Panlalawigan elections ==
Party	Votes	%	Seats
PDP-Laban	593,551	65.96	8
Aksyon	106,800	11.87	1
PDDS	89,500	9.95	1
IND	60,222	6.69	0
PFP	49,798	5.53	0
Total	899,871	100.00	10

=== 1st district ===
13 candidates are running in the 1st district. Three of the candidates are incumbent board members, Gigi Zacate, Byron Suyot, and Annabelle Capito. A total of four parties are participating in the election. Pederalismo ng Dugong Dakilang Samahan (PDDS) with one candidate, PDP-Laban with five candidates, Aksyon Demokratiko with two candidates, and Partido Federal ng Pilipinas (PFP) with three candidates. In the results, four PDP-Laban candidates and one PDDS candidate won the election.

2022 Provincial Board Election in 1st District of Eastern Samar
Party	Candidate	Votes	%
PDDS	Philip Evardone Jr.	89,500	30.59
PDP–Laban	Gigi Zacate	83,896	28.68
PDP–Laban	Byron Suyot	78,755	26.92
PDP–Laban	Annabelle Capito	63,402	21.67
PDP–Laban	Jun Quelitano	57,535	19.67
Independent	Renato Bagacay	49,231	16.83
Aksyon	Glenn Escoto	33,564	11.47
Aksyon	FBI Bagro	15,662	5.35
Independent	Gio Baquilod	10,991	3.76
PFP	Benedicto Gudes Sr.	7,387	2.53
PDP–Laban	Juan Buna Jr.	6,769	2.31
PFP	Thelma Dalina	6,699	2.29
PFP	Nicolas Hicao	3,017	1.03
Total votes		506,408	100

=== 2nd district ===
11 candidates are running in the 2nd district. Three of the candidates were incumbents, Pol Gonzales, Christelle Yadao, and Nestonette Cablao. Three parties joined the election, PDP-Laban with five candidates, PFP with five candidates, and Aksyon Demokratiko with one candidate. In the results, four PDP-Laban candidates and one Aksyon Demokratiko candidate won.

2022 Provincial Board Election in 2nd District of Eastern Samar
Party	Candidate	Votes	%
PDP–Laban	Pol Gonzales	71,946	24.59
PDP–Laban	Evet Bandoy-Gaylon	65,199	22.29
PDP–Laban	Christelle Yadao	64,796	22.15
PDP–Laban	Mergal Melchor	58,126	19.87
Aksyon	Nestonette Cablao	57,574	19.68
PDP–Laban	Maning Velasco	43,127	14.74
PFP	Boyboy Baldono	11,857	4.05
PFP	Rodito Fabillar	7,683	2.63
PFP	Camilo Salazar	6,753	2.31
PFP	Doniego Alluso	3,599	1.23
PFP	Jose Vallejos	2,803	0.96
Total votes		393,463	100

== City and municipal elections ==
=== Arteche ===
Arteche mayoral election
Party	Candidate	Votes	%
PDP–Laban	Bowad Evardone	8,028	100
Total votes		8,028	100
PDP–Laban hold			

Arteche vice mayoral election
Party	Candidate	Votes	%
PDP–Laban	Rolando Evardone	7,928	100
Total votes		7,928	100
PDP–Laban hold			

=== Balangiga ===
Balangiga mayoral election
Party	Candidate	Votes	%
PDDS	Dana De Lira	4,688	54.95
PDP–Laban	Randy Graza	3,800	44.54
PFP	Norma Salazar	44	0.52
Total votes		8,532	100
PDDS gain from PDP–Laban			

Balangiga vice mayoral election
Party	Candidate	Votes	%
Lakas	Dandan Ablay	4,691	57.02
PDP–Laban	Gina Congzon	3,536	42.98
Total votes		8,227	100
Lakas gain from PDP–Laban			

=== Balangkayan ===
Balangkayan mayoral election
Party	Candidate	Votes	%
PDP–Laban	Anne Contado Basco	5,162	83.73
PFP	Rano Gesite	1,003	16.27
Total votes		6,165	100
PDP–Laban gain from Liberal			

Balangkayan vice mayoral election
Party	Candidate	Votes	%
Liberal	Nerafie Contado	3,744	60.51
PFP	Charles Culo	2,443	39.49
Total votes		6,187	100
Liberal gain from PDP–Laban			

=== Borongan City ===
Borongan mayoral election
Party	Candidate	Votes	%
PDP–Laban	Dayan Agda	28,160	74.15
Aksyon	Jennifer Anacio	9,816	25.85
Total votes		37,976	100
PDP–Laban gain from NUP			

Borongan vice mayoral election
Party	Candidate	Votes	%
PDP–Laban	Emmanuel Tiu Sonco	31,693	100
Total votes		31,693	100
PDP–Laban gain from LDP			

=== Can-avid ===
Can-avid mayoral election
Party	Candidate	Votes	%
Independent	Vilma Germino	6,627	50.92
PDP–Laban	Vanessa Kerrigan	5,734	44.06
Independent	Jinky Geli-khoo	561	4.31
Aksyon	Juana Liza Alcansado	93	0.71
Total votes		13,015	100
Independent gain from PDP–Laban			

Can-avid vice mayoral election
Party	Candidate	Votes	%
PDP–Laban	Toytoy Germino	7,454	60.87
Independent	Gene Albert Coles	4,117	33.62
Aksyon	Joaquin Gayda	486	3.97
PFP	Virgilio Lavado	108	0.88
Reporma	Dionesio Ninora	81	0.66
Total votes		12,246	100
PDP–Laban hold			

=== Dolores ===
Dolores mayoral election
Party	Candidate	Votes	%
Independent	Onoy Rivera	11,508	51.25
PDP–Laban	Zaldy Carpeso	10,946	48.75
Total votes		22,454	100
Independent gain from PDP–Laban			

Dolores, Eastern Samar vice mayoral election
Party	Candidate	Votes	%
PDP–Laban	Shonny Nino Carpeso	13,275	100
Total votes		13,275	100
PDP–Laban hold			

=== General MacArthur ===
General MacArthur mayoral election
Party	Candidate	Votes	%
PDP–Laban	Flora Ty	5,234	65.33
PFP	Rogel Ida	2,264	28.26
Independent	Tibong Merillo	514	6.42
Total votes		8,012	100
PDP–Laban hold			

General MacArthur vice mayoral election
Party	Candidate	Votes	%
PDP–Laban	Joel Baldo	5,197	67.40
PFP	Luz Japzon	2,448	31.75
Independent	Eusebio Batlangao Jr.	66	0.86
Total votes		7,711	100
PDP–Laban hold			

=== Giporlos ===
Giporlos mayoral election
Party	Candidate	Votes	%
PDP–Laban	Gilbert Go	4,576	53.11
LDP	Mark Biong	4,040	46.89
Total votes		8,616	100
PDP–Laban gain from Liberal			

Giporlos vice mayoral election
Party	Candidate	Votes	%
PROMDI	Christopher Go	4,576	54.33
LDP	Licel Biong	3,847	45.67
Total votes		8,423	100
PROMDI gain from PDP–Laban			

=== Guiuan ===
Guiuan mayoral election
Party	Candidate	Votes	%
Nacionalista	Annaliza Kwan	16,401	56.04
Aksyon	Jearim Tumanda	8,707	29.75
Liberal	Goyo Cabacaba	4,156	14.20
Total votes		29,264	100
Nacionalista hold			

Guiuan vice mayoral election
Party	Candidate	Votes	%
PDP–Laban	Vero Cabacaba-Ramirez	22,531	83.66
Aksyon	Fanny Egargo	4,401	16.34
Total votes		26,932	100
PDP–Laban gain from Nacionalista			

=== Hernani ===
Hernani mayoral election
Party	Candidate	Votes	%
PDP–Laban	Amado Candido	3,006	53.92
Liberal	Edgar Boco	2,569	46.08
Total votes		5,575	100
PDP–Laban hold			

Hernani vice mayoral election
Party	Candidate	Votes	%
Liberal	Cesar Tagon Jr.	2,792	51.53
PDP–Laban	Imelyn Montero	2,626	48.47
Total votes		5,418	100
Liberal gain from PDP–Laban			

=== Jipapad ===
Jipapad mayoral election
Party	Candidate	Votes	%
PDP–Laban	Benjamin Ver	3,089	52.10
PFP	Delia Monleon	2,840	47.90
Total votes		5,929	100
PDP–Laban hold			

Jipapad vice mayoral election
Party	Candidate	Votes	%
PDP–Laban	Oscar Amigo	2,903	50.69
PFP	Neil Norombaba	2,824	49.31
Total votes		5,418	100
PDP–Laban hold			

=== Lawaan ===
Lawaan mayoral election
Party	Candidate	Votes	%
Lakas	Athene Mendros	4,917	56.28
Aksyon	Rebecca Almeda	3,820	43.72
Total votes		8,737	100
Lakas gain from PFP			

Jipapad vice mayoral election
Party	Candidate	Votes	%
PDP–Laban	Ravi Parker Inciso	4,481	52.19
Aksyon	Sofronio Ecaldre	4,105	47.81
Total votes		8,586	100
PDP–Laban gain from Lakas			

=== Llorente ===
Llorente mayoral election
Party	Candidate	Votes	%
Lakas	Daniel Boco	8,627	100
Total votes		8,627	100
Lakas gain from PDP–Laban			

Llorente vice mayoral election
Party	Candidate	Votes	%
PDP–Laban	Jonnie Condrada	8,104	100
Total votes		8,104	100
PDP–Laban hold			

=== Maslog ===
Maslog mayoral election
Party	Candidate	Votes	%
PDP–Laban	Rac Santiago	2,225	100
Total votes		2,225	100
PDP–Laban hold			

Maslog vice mayoral election
Party	Candidate	Votes	%
PDP–Laban	Dok Santiago	2,226	100
Total votes		2,226	100
PDP–Laban hold			

=== Maydolong ===
Maydolong mayoral election
Party	Candidate	Votes	%
PDP–Laban	Goody Garado	6,376	71.77
PFP	Jenny Baldono	2,506	28.23
Total votes		8,456	100
PDP–Laban hold			

Maydolong vice mayoral election
Party	Candidate	Votes	%
PDP–Laban	Louie Borja	6,319	74.73
PLM	Hilo-Hilo Corado	2,137	25.27
Total votes		8,456	100
PDP–Laban hold			

=== Mercedes ===
Mercedes mayoral election
Party	Candidate	Votes	%
PDP–Laban	Edwin Quiminales	3,628	79.01
Liberal	Enrique Cabos	964	20.99
Total votes		4,592	100
PDP–Laban gain from Nacionalista			

Mercedes vice mayoral election
Party	Candidate	Votes	%
PDP–Laban	Jose Talagtag	2,522	55.40
Liberal	Aurolino Cabos	2,030	44.60
Total votes		4,552	100
PDP–Laban gain from Nacionalista			

=== Oras ===
Oras mayoral election
Party	Candidate	Votes	%
PDDS	Oramismo Ador	13,704	62.96
PDP–Laban	Neil Alvarez	8,062	37.04
Total votes		21,766	100
PDDS gain from PDP–Laban			

Oras vice mayoral election
Party	Candidate	Votes	%
PDDS	Adolfo Mugas	12,077	57.12
PDP–Laban	Irvin Pormida	9,065	42.88
Total votes		21,142	100
PDDS gain from PDP–Laban			

=== Quinapondan ===
Quinapondan mayoral election
Party	Candidate	Votes	%
PDP–Laban	Rafael Asebias	6,196	100
Total votes		6,196	100
PDP–Laban hold			

Quinapondan vice mayoral election
Party	Candidate	Votes	%
PDP–Laban	Jasper Candido	5,158	62.42
Independent	Elena Macawile	3,105	37.58
Total votes		8,263	100
PDP–Laban hold			

=== Salcedo ===
Salcedo mayoral election
Party	Candidate	Votes	%
PDP–Laban	Rochelle Mergal	6,215	49.42
CDP	King Padit	6,139	48.82
KBL	Felis Regis	166	1.32
Aksyon	Joselito Abrugar Sr.	55	0.44
Total votes		12,575	100
PDP–Laban hold			

Salcedo vice mayoral election
Party	Candidate	Votes	%
PDP–Laban	Maricris Fabillar	7,660	78.69
PFP	Amado Garcia	2,075	21.31
Total votes		9,735	100
PDP–Laban gain from PFP			

=== San Julian ===
San Julian mayoral election
Party	Candidate	Votes	%
PDP–Laban	Dennis Estaron	5,102	57.98
KBL	Jojo Erroba	3,698	42.02
Total votes		8,800	100
PDP–Laban hold			

San Julian vice mayoral election
Party	Candidate	Votes	%
PDP–Laban	Yuri Acol	4,943	60.74
KBL	Bato Colico	3,195	39.26
Total votes		8,138	100
PDP–Laban hold			

=== San Policarpo ===
San Policarpo mayoral election
Party	Candidate	Votes	%
PDP–Laban	Conrado Nicart III	5,043	51.09
PDDS	Marcel Lim	4,827	48.91
Total votes		9,870	100
PDP–Laban gain from PMP			

San Policarpo vice mayoral election
Party	Candidate	Votes	%
PDP–Laban	Thelma Nicart	5,033	51.55
PDDS	Virginia Acol	4,731	48.45
Total votes		9,764	100
PDP–Laban hold			

=== Sulat ===
Sulat mayoral election
Party	Candidate	Votes	%
PDP–Laban	Javier Zacate	6,233	61.95
Independent	Amado Amigo	3,776	37.53
Independent	Adelina Acong	52	0.52
Total votes		10,061	100
PDP–Laban hold			

Sulat vice mayoral election
Party	Candidate	Votes	%
PDP–Laban	Dondon Evardone	6,912	71.54
Independent	Cora Tikiko	2,750	28.46
Total votes		9,662	100
PDP–Laban hold			

=== Taft ===
Taft mayoral election
Party	Candidate	Votes	%
PDP–Laban	Ama Gina Ty	9,156	86.85
PFP	Gaspar Quebec	747	7.09
Independent	Santos Simborios	639	6.06
Total votes		10,542	100
PDP–Laban hold			

Taft vice mayoral election
Party	Candidate	Votes	%
PDP–Laban	Maricon Adalim-Hilario	7,042	65.65
Independent	Diego Lim	3,685	34.35
Total votes		10,727	100
PDP–Laban hold			
