= Samar Island Natural Park =

Protected area in the Philippines

- Samar Natural Park
- IUCN category II (national park)
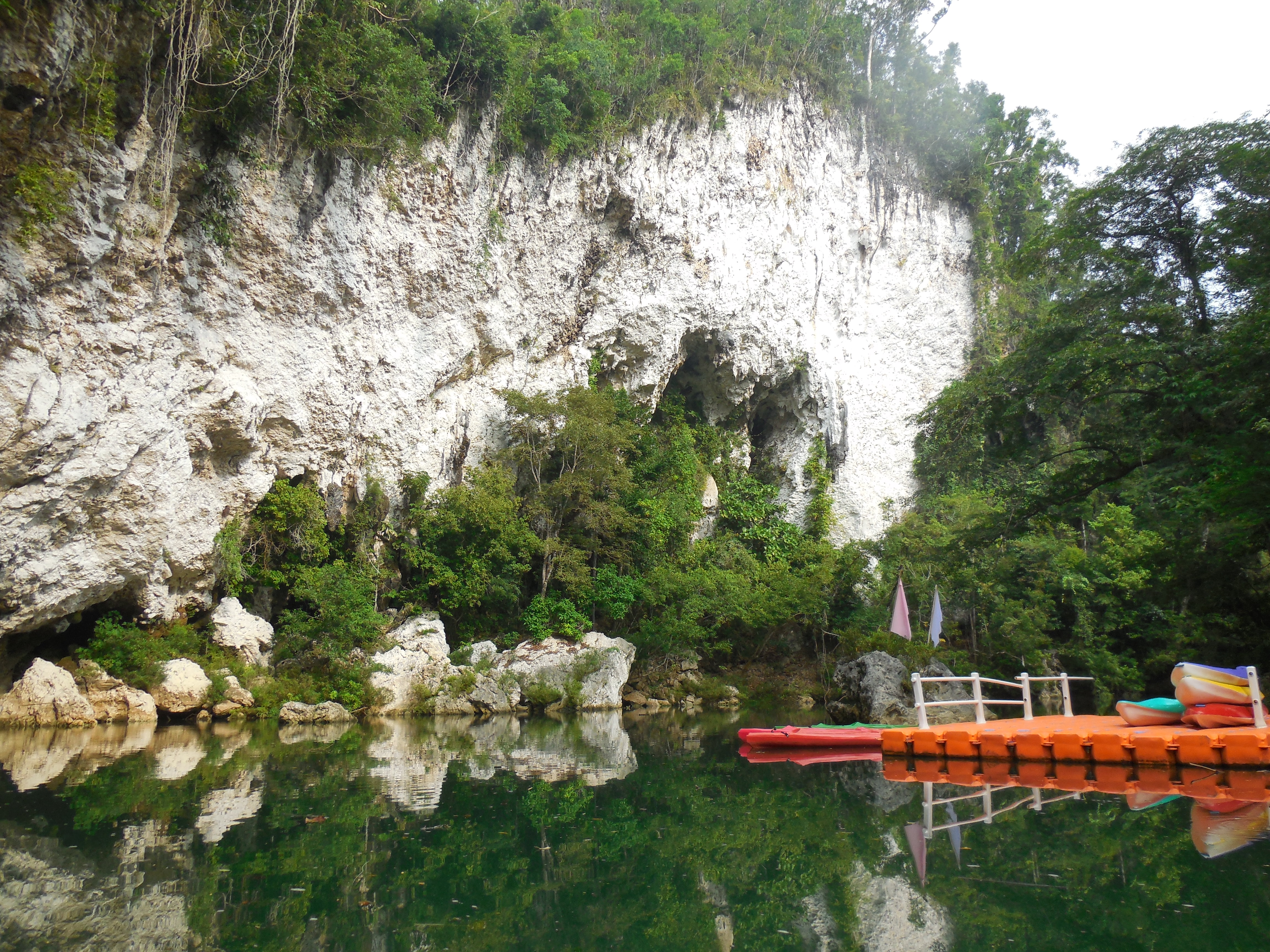
- Entrance to the Panhulugan Cave at the Sohoton Natural Bridge Park

- Location within Philippines
- Location: Samar
- Nearest city: Tacloban
- Coordinates: 12°2′10″N 125°12′40″E
- Area: 333,300 hectares (824,000 acres)
- Established: February 20, 1996 (forest reserve); August 13, 2003 (natural park)
- Governing body: Department of Environment and Natural Resources

The Samar Island Natural Park, in Samar, is the largest contiguous tract of old-growth forest in the Philippines. It is the country's largest terrestrial protected area, with an area of 333,300 hectares (824,000 acres). The buffer is spread north to south over the island's three provinces (Eastern Samar, Northern Samar and Samar province) and totals 458,700 hectares (1,133,000 acres), about a third of the entire island of Samar.

The park includes some of the island's well-known natural landmarks and landscapes which have been earlier designated for protection, namely the former Sohoton Natural Bridge National Park, the former Calbiga Caves Protected Landscape, the former Taft Forest Wildlife Sanctuary, the former Jicontol Watershed Forest Reserve and the former Bulosao Watershed Forest Reserve. It has a large biodiversity. It is a center of plant and animal diversity and endemism in the Philippines containing a number of threatened species belonging to the Eastern Visayas and Mindanao biogeographic region.

Samar Island Natural Park was declared a national park under Republic Act No. 11038 (Expanded National Integrated Protected Areas System Act of 2018) signed by President Rodrigo Duterte in July 2018.

== Geography ==
The Samar Island Natural Park occupies the low rugged central mountain range of the island of Samar shared by all three provinces in the island. It extends from the Northern Samar municipalities of Catubig, Las Navas, Lope de Vega, Mondragon and Silvino Lobos in the north to the Eastern Samar municipalities of Arteche, Balangiga, Balangkayan, Borongan, Can-avid, Dolores, General MacArthur, Giporlos, Hernani, Jipapad, Lawaan, Llorente, Maslog, Maydolong, Oras, Quinapondan, San Julian, Sulat and Taft; and the Samar Province municipalities of Basey, Calbayog, Calbiga, Catbalogan, Gandara, Hinabangan, Jiabong, Marabut, Matuguinao, Motiong, Paranas, Pinabacdao, San Jorge and San Jose de Buan in the island's central and southern regions.

The headwaters of 25 watersheds begin from the slopes in the natural park. The largest is the Suribao watershed with an area of 60,145 hectares (148,620 acres), followed by Can-avid (58,653 hectares (144,930 acres)), Dolores (48,033 hectares (118,690 acres)), Catubig (43,050 hectares (106,400 acres)), Gandara (39,943 hectares (98,700 acres)), and Taft (37,127 hectares (91,740 acres)).

The natural park consists of an interior highland with marked accordant peaks and a surrounding limestone or karst terrain. In the southern portion, the landscape is composed of jungle-covered limestone ridges. Its geology is mostly Miocene and Holocene with a sedimentary formation consisting of basement rocks and overlying clastic rocks or limestone. Its ecosystems include grasslands, agroforestry areas, forest-over-limestone, riparian ecosystem, lowland mixed dipterocarp forest, and mossy or cloud forest.

The park is a known habitat of the Philippine eagle. It also has a significant population of the Philippine eagle-owl, Philippine tarsier, Philippine flying lemur and Philippine tree squirrel. It was declared a forest reserve in 1996 but raised to the status of natural park in 2003.

=== Sohoton Natural Bridge Park ===
The Sohoton Natural Bridge Park is a conservation area and ecotourism site in the municipality of Basey known for its geological features including its natural stone bridge which connects two mountain ridges across a gorge, and an extensive cave system with unique limestone formations. It covers 840 hectares (2,100 acres) and was earlier established on July 19, 1935, through Proclamation No. 831 issued by Governor-General Frank Murphy.

=== Calbiga Caves Park ===
The Langun-Gobingob cave system is in the natural park. It is considered the biggest cave in the Philippines.

=== Taft Forest ===
In the municipality of Taft, Eastern Samar, 3,728.98 hectares (9,214.5 acres) of rainforest have been protected as a wildlife sanctuary since 1999. The area is a known nesting site and natural habitat of the critically endangered Philippine eagle. The endemic giant forest raptor was first spotted in the island in the municipality of Paranas on June 15, 1856, by the British explorer John Whitehead.

=== Jicontol Forest ===
The Jicontol Watershed Forest Reserve, first gazetted in 1992 and reclassified as a natural park in 1998, covers 6,483 hectares (16,020 acres) in the municipalities of Dolores, Can-avid and Maslog. It is a component of the Mounts Cabalantian-Capotoan Complex, an important bird area, which comprises the mountains of central Samar at the border of Eastern Samar and Samar provinces. This forest is home to many threatened and restricted-range species of the Mindanao and Eastern Visayas Endemic Bird Area, such as the Samar hornbill, Visayan broadbill and yellow-breasted tailorbird. Its forest cover consists of typical dipterocarp and molave-dipterocarp with mid mountain type vegetation in the highest peaks reaching to 850 metres (2,790 ft). There have also been sightings of the Southern silvery kingfisher and the Philippine eagle in the forest.

=== Bulosao Watershed ===
The Bulosao watershed reserve in the forests of the southern Samar mountain range adjacent to the MacArthur mountains was established in 1992 to preserve and maintain the usefulness of the Bulosao River as a source of water for domestic use and irrigation of the municipalities of Marabut and Lawaan. The 4,055-hectare (10,020-acre) forest park borders the Sulat River to the north and west, and includes Mount Honop, its highest peak at 731 metres (2,398 ft).

== See also ==
- List of natural parks of the Philippines
