= 2022 Philippine presidential election in Eastern Samar =

- May 9, 2022
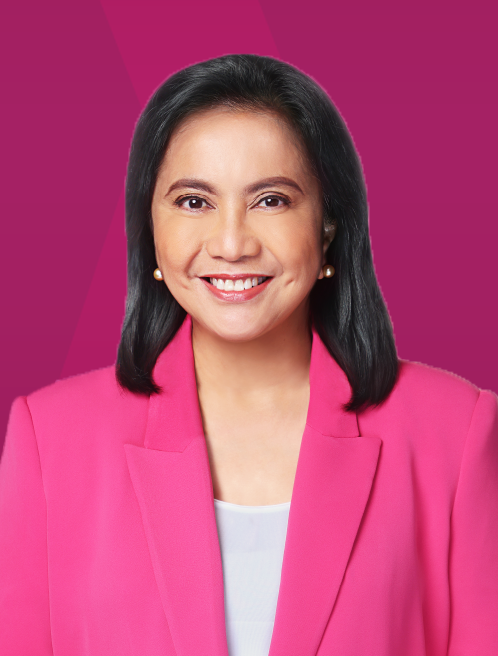

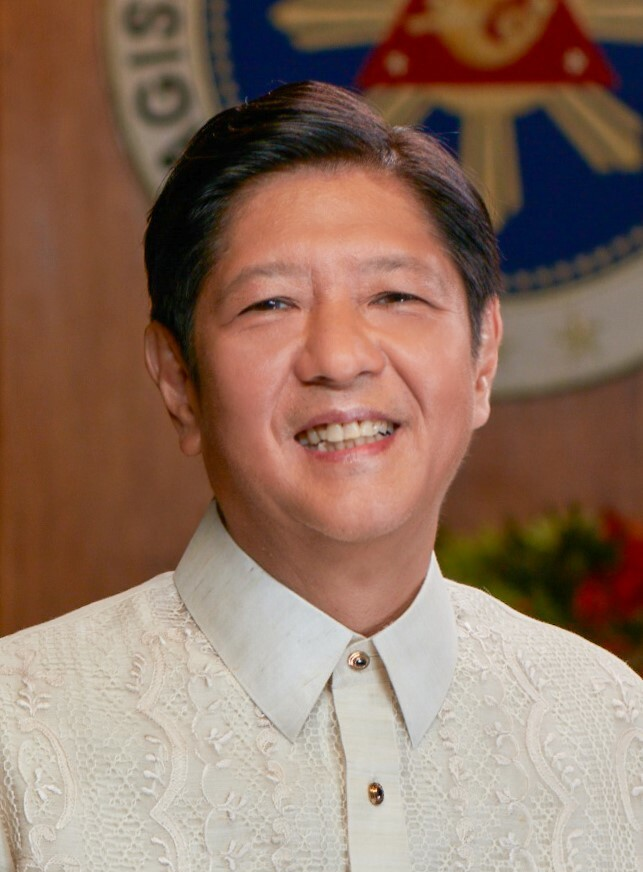
Candidate	Leni Robredo	Bongbong Marcos
Party	Independent	Partido Federal ng Pilipinas
Running mate	Kiko Pangilinan	Sara Duterte
Popular vote	123,868	107,415
Percentage	45.31	39.29
President before election
Rodrigo Duterte
PDP–Laban
Elected President
Bongbong Marcos
PFP

In the 2022 Philippine presidential election in Eastern Samar, ten candidates were present. The eventual winner was Leni Robredo locally, with Bongbong Marcos in 2nd place, and Manny Pacquiao in third place.

On February 8, the first campaign started in Eastern Samar, when Leni Robredo started a caravan with thousands of people. The next month, 19 mayors, the governor himself, and the congresswoman expressed their support for Leni Robredo after the Kakampink rally in Baybay Boulevard. Bongbong Marcos also started a rally on April 9. Manny Pacquiao and Isko Moreno also visited Eastern Samar.

== Background ==
There are 10 candidates for president, with the top two of them clashing in the 2016 Philippine vice-presidential election, where Robredo won in total and in Eastern Samar.

=== Campaigns ===
==== Leni Robredo (Independent) ====
On February 8, a caravan started in Eastern Samar, with thousands of people joining, including mayors and vice mayors in Eastern Samar. On February 10, eight mayors, two vice mayors, and one councilor supported Leni Robredo in the Kakampink headquarters in Borongan, Eastern Samar. On March 29, 19 mayors out of the 23 total mayors of the province joined Ben Evardone to support Leni Robredo just after the local campaign rally in Baybay Boulevard. Congresswoman Maria Fe Abunda and Boy Abunda also supported Robredo, with the latter praising her for her anti-poverty efforts. Some controversy was made when Ben Evardone supported Leni Robredo, since Evardone was the vice president of the Partido Demokratiko Pilipino party in the Visayas, though the leader of the party supported rival Sara Duterte and Bongbong Marcos.

==== Bongbong Marcos (Partido Federal ng Pilipinas) ====
On April 9, a rally was held for Bongbong Marcos in Eastern Samar. Marcos allegedly ignored his pilot's instruction coming to Samar because of bad weather, stating that "When it rains, it should get cooler. But here in Borongan, when it rains, it gets warmer". The rally was held in Borongan Plaza. During the show, a 95-year-old fan named Alejandro Duzon gained an honorable mention in the rally. Marcos stated that he was a "very important person" and "loyalist". Senator Ronald dela Rosa was Marcos's campaign manager in Eastern Visayas.

==== Other campaigns ====
Manny Pacquiao visited Eastern Samar on April 27. Isko Moreno also visited Eastern Samar, promising funding for the Samar provinces.

== Results ==
2022 Presidential election in Eastern Samar
Party	Candidate	Votes	%
IND	Leni Robredo	123,868	45.31%
PFP	Bongbong Marcos	107,415	39.29%
PROMDI	Manny Pacquiao	27,365	10.01%
Aksyon	Isko Moreno	8,660	3.17%
Reporma	Ping Lacson	2,806	1.03%
IND	Ernie Abella	1,112	0.41%
PDSP	Norberto Gonzales	905	0.33%
PLM	Leody de Guzman	683	0.25%
DPP	Jose Montemayor Jr.	361	0.13%
Katipunan	Faisal Mangondato	190	0.07%
Total votes		273,365	99.60%

=== Result by municipality/city ===
Result per municipality / city
Municipality	Robredo		Marcos		Pacquiao		Moreno		Lacson		Various Candidates		Total Votes Cast
Municipality	Votes	%	Votes	%	Votes	%	Votes	%	Votes	%	Votes	%	Total Votes Cast
Arteche	7,696	85.47	1,079	11.98	132	1.47	27	0.30	13	0.14	57	0.63	12,240
Balangiga	1,794	21.77	4,135	50.18	1,857	22.54	231	2.80	90	1.15	128	1.56	10,617
Balangkayan	3,773	60.52	1,799	28.86	420	6.74	144	2.31	37	0.59	61	0.97	7,721
Borongan	17,761	42.49	17,159	41.05	4,796	11.47	1,219	2.92	534	1.28	330	0.71	50,258
Can-avid	5,442	42.08	5,753	44.49	1,175	9.09	248	1.92	146	1.13	167	1.28	12,931
Dolores	12,846	55.61	6,969	30.17	2,269	9.82	428	1.85	230	1.00	359	1.56	23,101
General MacArthur	4,027	50.78	2,328	29.35	1,221	15.40	177	2.23	71	0.90	107	1.34	7,931
Giporlos	2,039	25.05	3,814	46.86	1,893	23.26	226	2.78	72	0.88	96	1.18	8,140
Guiuan	11,736	39.73	12,019	40.69	2,233	7.56	2,677	9.08	411	1.39	463	1.57	29,539
Hernani	2,372	44.66	2,400	45.19	326	6.14	116	2.18	54	1.02	43	0.80	5,311
Jipapad	2,441	46.66	1,901	36.34	641	12.25	132	2.52	41	0.78	75	1.43	5,231
Lawaan	2,323	27.60	3,869	45.97	1,815	21.56	238	2.83	82	0.97	90	1.07	8,417
Llorente	3,675	33.49	6,760	61.60	384	3.50	78	0.71	21	0.19	56	0.51	10,974
