= Leyte Gulf =

Gulf located east of the island of Leyte in the Philippines

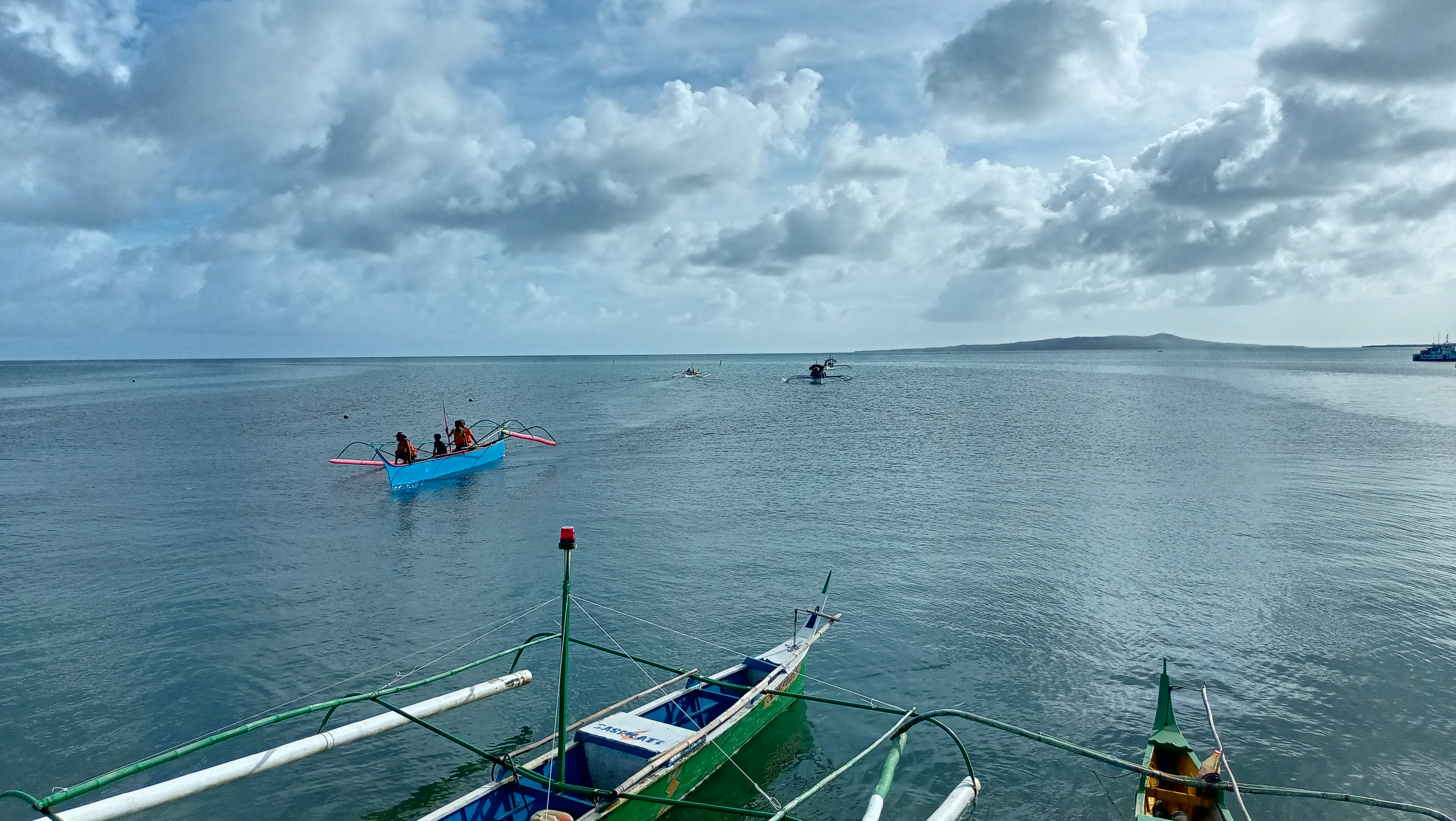
- Motorized outrigger boats over Leyte Gulf in the Eastern Samar town of Guiuan, with Manicani Island in the distance

- Location within the Philippines Leyte Gulf (Philippines)
- Location: Eastern Visayas
- Coordinates: 10°50′00″N 125°25′00″E
- Type: gulf
- Etymology: Leyte
- Part of: Philippine Sea
- Settlements: Abuyog; Balangiga; Basey; Dulag; Giporlos; Guiuan; Hinunangan; Hinundayan; Javier; Lawaan; Loreto MacArthur; Marabut; Mayorga; Mercedes; Palo; Quinapondan; Salcedo; Silago; Tacloban; Tanauan; Tolosa

Leyte Gulf, also known simply as the Leyte, is a gulf in the Eastern Visayan region in the Philippines. The bay is part of the Philippine Sea of the Pacific Ocean, and is bounded by two islands; Samar in the north and Leyte in the west. On the south of the bay is Mindanao Island, separated from Leyte by the Surigao Strait. Dinagat Island partly encloses the gulf to the southeast, and the small Homonhon Island and Suluan Island, sit astride the eastern entrance to the Gulf. It is approximately 130 km (81 mi) north-south, and 60 km (37 mi) east-west.

Several municipalities are situated on the coast of the gulf: Balangiga, Giporlos, Guiuan, Lawaan, Mercedes, Quinapondan and Salcedo. There are also eleven marine reserves in the gulf region.

Leyte Gulf was also the scene of the Battle of Leyte Gulf, which extends to Surigao Strait during the Battle of Surigao Strait, the largest naval battle of World War II and started the end of Japanese occupation in the Philippines. During World War II the gulf was part of a large US Navy base Leyte-Samar Naval Base.

In 2013, Typhoon Haiyan stirred up a storm surge in Leyte Gulf, resulting in massive loss of lives, agricultural land and property along Leyte's shores.

== Fishing ==
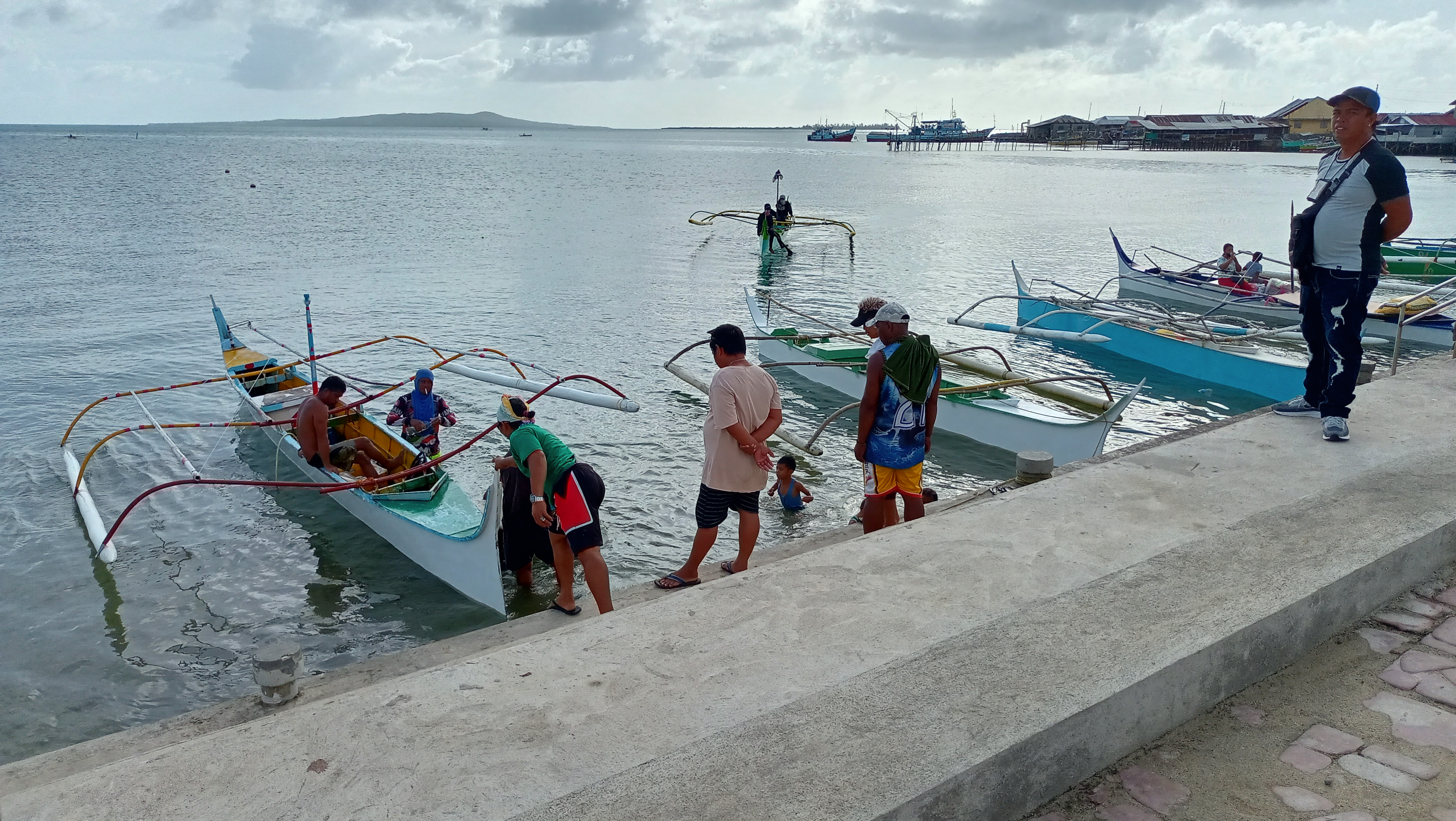
Leyte Gulf fisherfolks unloading their catch in the Guiuan Integrated Transport Terminal

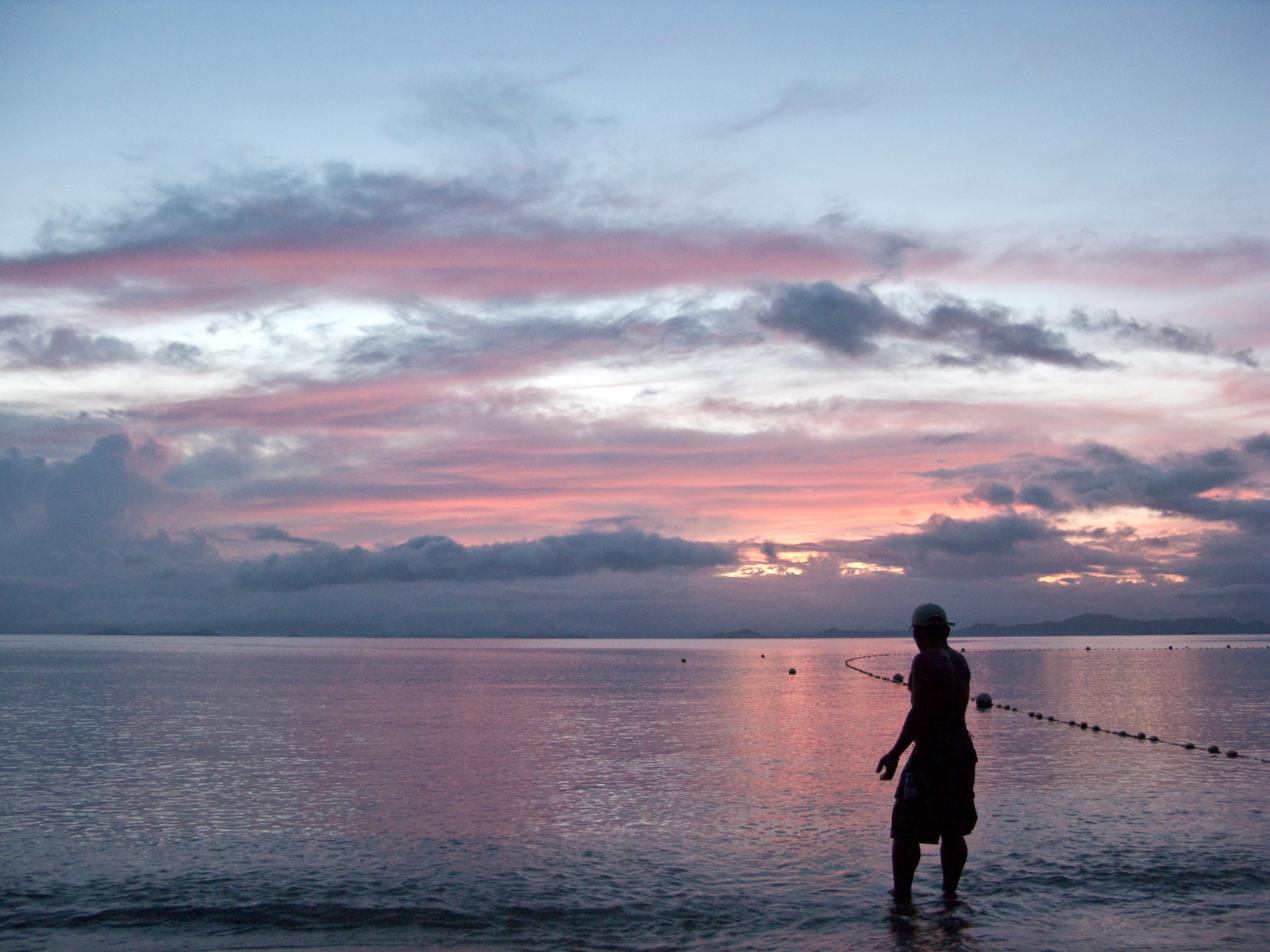
A man fishing in Leyte Gulf at twilight in Marabut

Leyte Gulf is identified by the Leyte State University as one of the important fishing grounds of Leyte and Samar. Like other rich fishing grounds such as Maqueda Bay and Carigara Bay, the gulf is known for abundant catches of anchovies, herring, shrimp and crabs. It was also once one of the richest sources of mud crabs in 1985. Fish harvest has been in decline in the gulf due to the use of dynamite fishing. Typhoon Haiyan has damaged the hard coral cover within the gulf's area, further reducing the fish harvest.

== Gallery ==
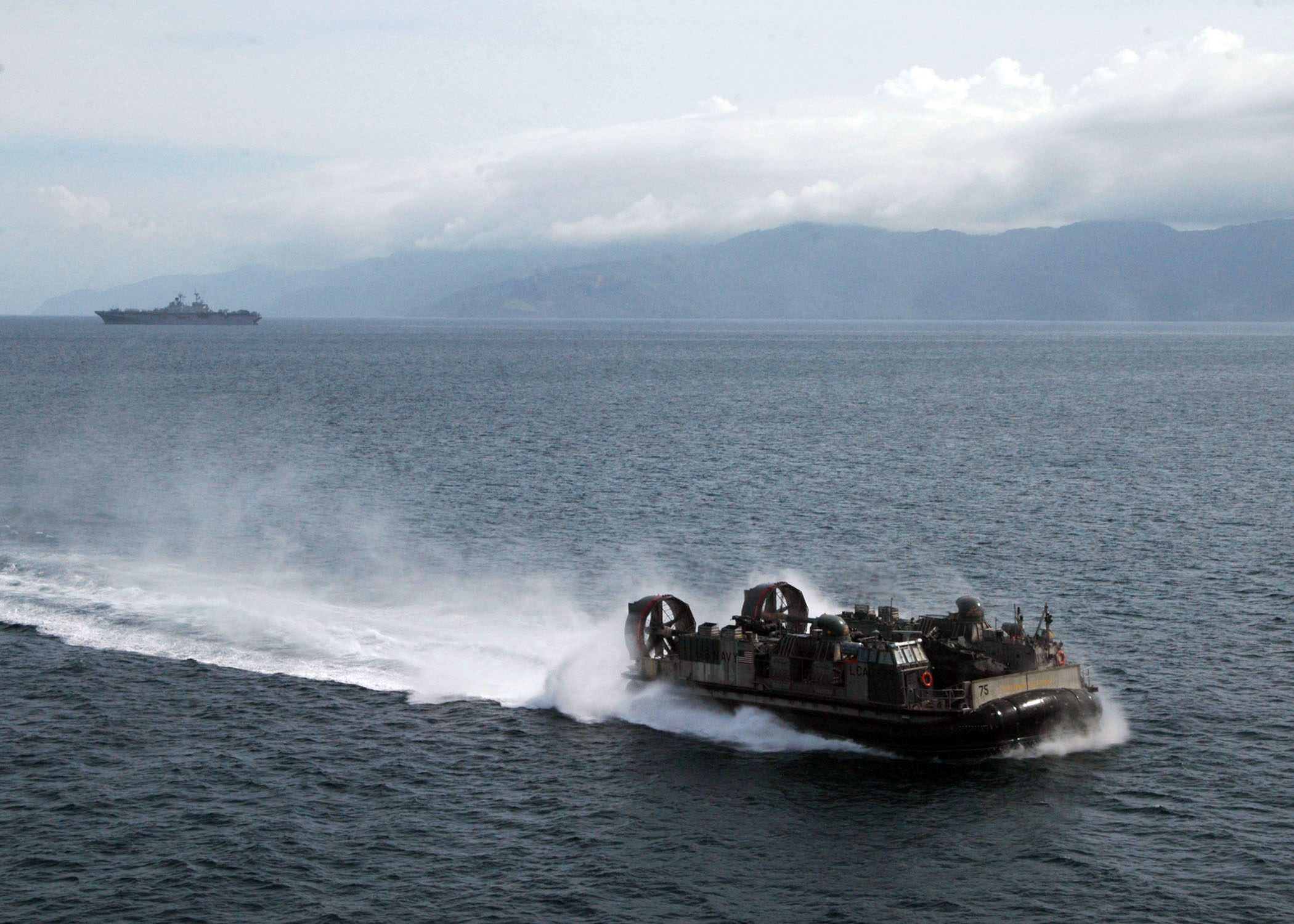
US Navy over Leyte Gulf for disaster relief efforts on the aftermath of the 2006 landslide in Guinsaugon, Saint Bernard, Southern Leyte

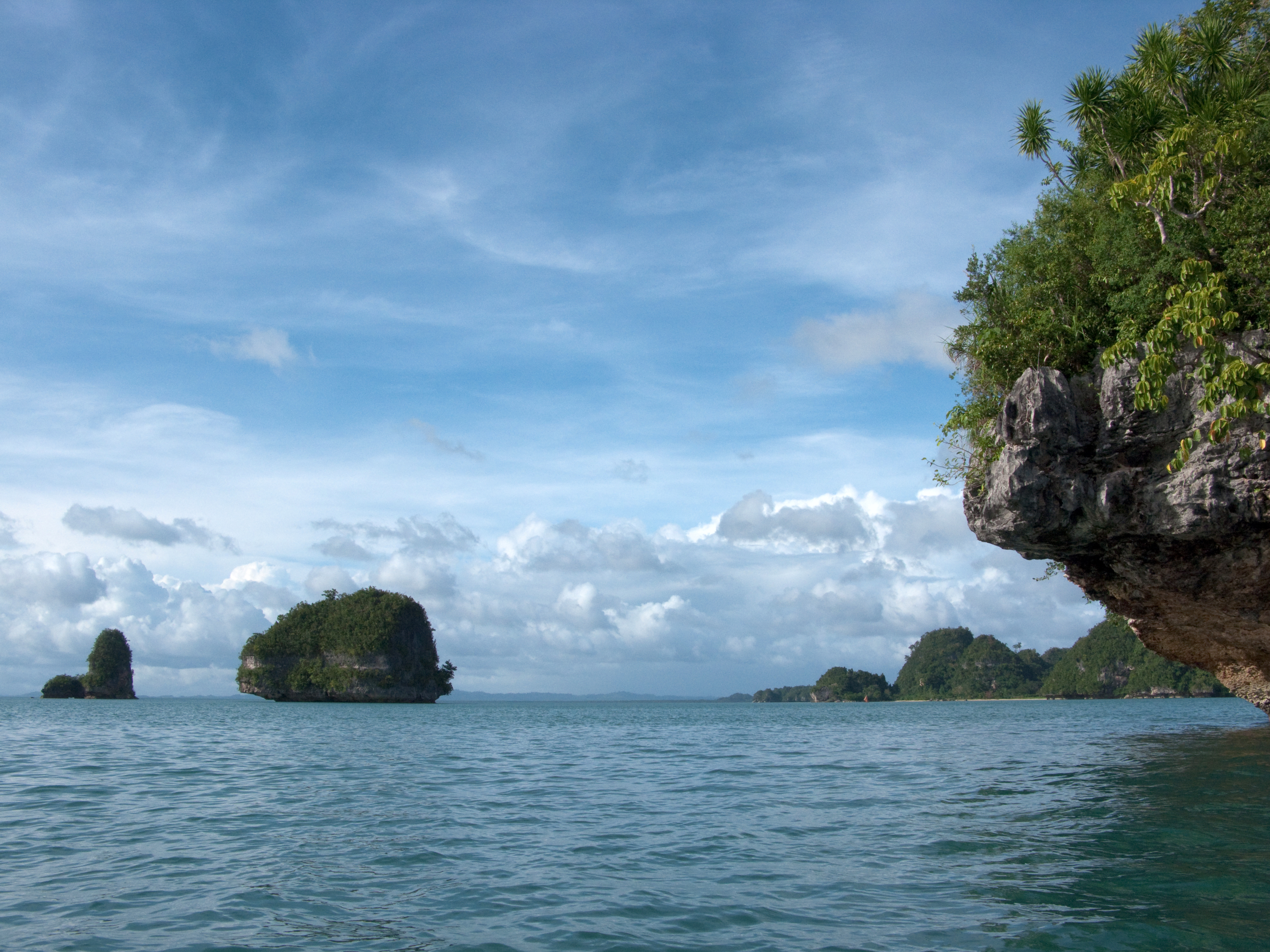
In Marabut, Samar: rock formations in the San Pedro Bay, in the northwest end of Leyte Gulf

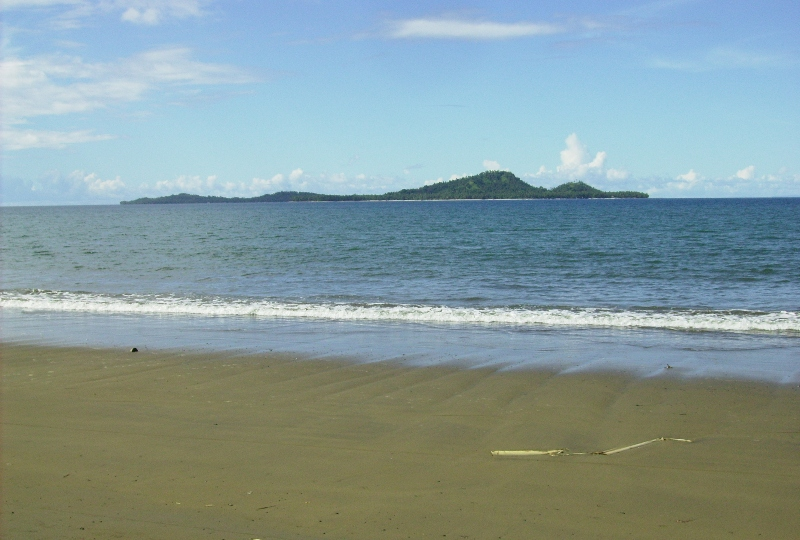
View of Leyte Gulf in Hinunangan, with the San Pedro and San Pablo Islands in the distance
