= Maslog =

Municipality in Eastern Samar, Philippines

- Municipality
- Municipality of Maslog
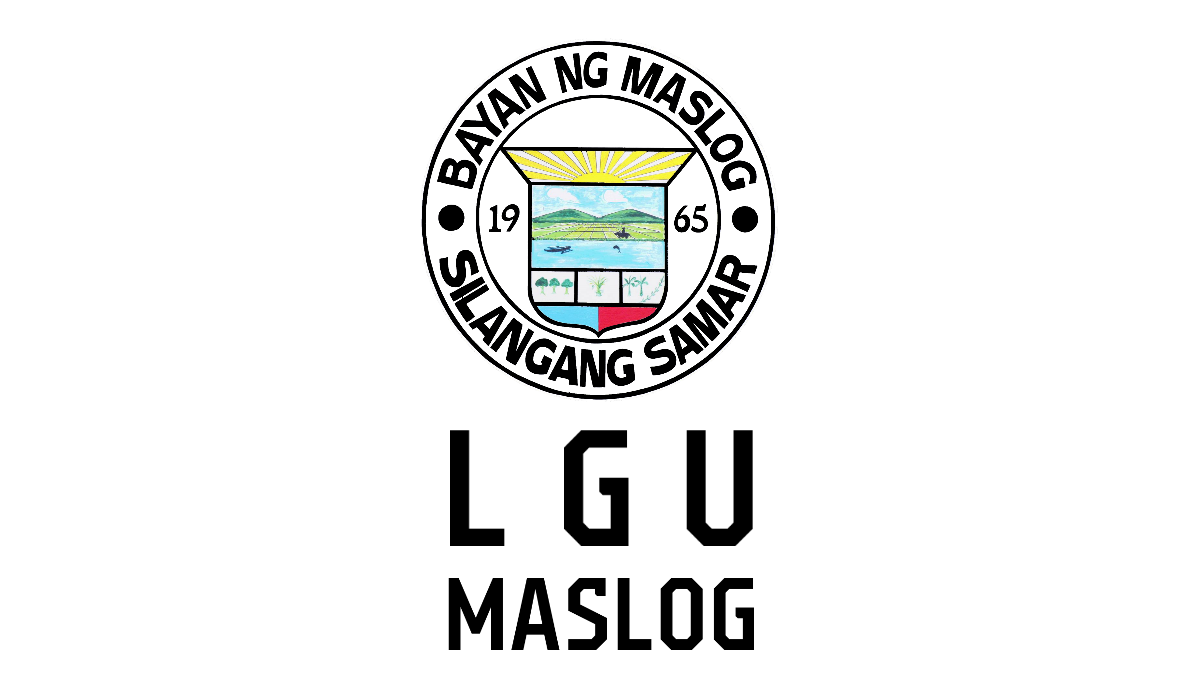
- Flag

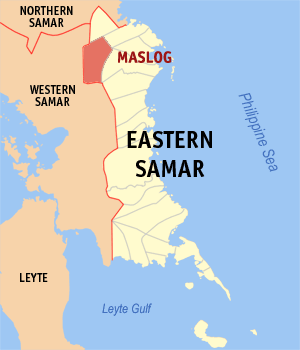
- Map of Eastern Samar with Maslog highlighted
- Interactive map of Maslog
- Location within the Philippines
- Coordinates: 12°09′33″N 125°14′49″E
- Country: Philippines
- Region: Eastern Visayas
- Province: Eastern Samar
- District: Lone district
- Barangays: 12 (see Barangays)

Government
  - Type: Sangguniang Bayan
  - Mayor: Heraclio C. Santiago
  - Vice Mayor: Septemio Bok C. Santiago
  - Representative: Maria Fe R. Abunda
  - Councilors: List: • Zacarias C. Santiago; • Elden A. Campomanes; • Leonardo R. Lazarra; • Mary Ann C. Lazarra; • Isidro L. Abestruz; • Carlito G. Quiba; • Avelino P. Opada; • Lucilo N. Valles; DILG Masterlist of Officials
  - Electorate: 3,669 voters (2025)

Area
  - Total: 249.8 km^{2} (96.4 sq mi)
- Elevation: 73 m (240 ft)
- Highest elevation: 329 m (1,079 ft)
- Lowest elevation: 7 m (23 ft)

Population (2024 census)
  - Total: 5,438
  - Density: 21.77/km^{2} (56.38/sq mi)
  - Households: 1,148

Economy
  - Income class: 4th municipal income class
  - Poverty incidence: 45.67% (2023)
  - Revenue: ₱ 125.9 million (2024)
  - Assets: ₱ 375.6 million (2024)
  - Expenditure: ₱ 112.6 million (2024)
  - Liabilities: ₱ 91.86 million (2024)

Service provider
  - Electricity: Eastern Samar Electric Cooperative (ESAMELCO)
- Time zone: UTC+8 (PST)
- ZIP code: 6820
- PSGC: 0802614000
- IDD : area code: +63 (0)55
- Native languages: Waray; Tagalog
- Website: www.maslog-esamar.gov.ph

Maslog, officially the Municipality of Maslog (Waray: Bungto han Maslog; Tagalog: Bayan ng Maslog), is a municipality in the province of Eastern Samar, Philippines. According to the 2024 census, it has a population of 5,438 people, making it the least populated town in the province and in the Visayas.

== Geography ==
=== Barangays ===
Maslog is politically subdivided into 12 barangays. Each barangay consists of puroks and some have sitios.

- Bulawan
- Carayacay
- Libertad
- Malobago
- Maputi
- Barangay 1 (Poblacion)
- Barangay 2 (Poblacion)
- San Miguel
- San Roque
- Tangbo
- Taytay
- Tugas

=== Climate ===
Climate data for Maslog, Eastern Samar
Month	Jan	Feb	Mar	Apr	May	Jun	Jul	Aug	Sep	Oct	Nov	Dec	Year
Mean daily maximum °C (°F)	27 (81)	27 (81)	28 (82)	29 (84)	30 (86)	30 (86)	29 (84)	29 (84)	29 (84)	29 (84)	28 (82)	28 (82)	29 (83)
Mean daily minimum °C (°F)	22 (72)	22 (72)	22 (72)	23 (73)	24 (75)	24 (75)	24 (75)	24 (75)	24 (75)	24 (75)	23 (73)	23 (73)	23 (74)
Average precipitation mm (inches)	97 (3.8)	64 (2.5)	69 (2.7)	58 (2.3)	98 (3.9)	161 (6.3)	167 (6.6)	140 (5.5)	158 (6.2)	171 (6.7)	169 (6.7)	154 (6.1)	1,506 (59.3)
Average rainy days	17.1	13.4	14.8	15.2	21.1	25.2	26.8	25.4	25.5	26.5	23.0	20.3	254.3
Source: Meteoblue

== Demographics ==
Population census of Maslog
Year	Pop.	±% p.a.
1918	408	—
1939	769	+3.06%
1948	1,131	+4.38%
1960	1,593	+2.89%
1970	1,988	+2.24%
1975	1,886	−1.05%
1980	1,956	+0.73%
1990	3,089	+4.68%
1995	3,634	+3.09%
2000	4,009	+2.13%
2007	4,788	+2.48%
2010	4,781	−0.05%
2015	5,407	+2.37%
2020	5,463	+0.22%
2024	5,438	−0.11%
Source: Philippine Statistics Authority

The population of Maslog in the 2024 census was 5,438 people, with a density of 220 inhabitants per square kilometre or 570 inhabitants per square mile.

== Economy ==
Poverty incidence of Maslog (%)

Source: Philippine Statistics Authority
