= Maydolong =

Municipality in Eastern Samar, Philippines

- Municipality
- Municipality of Maydolong
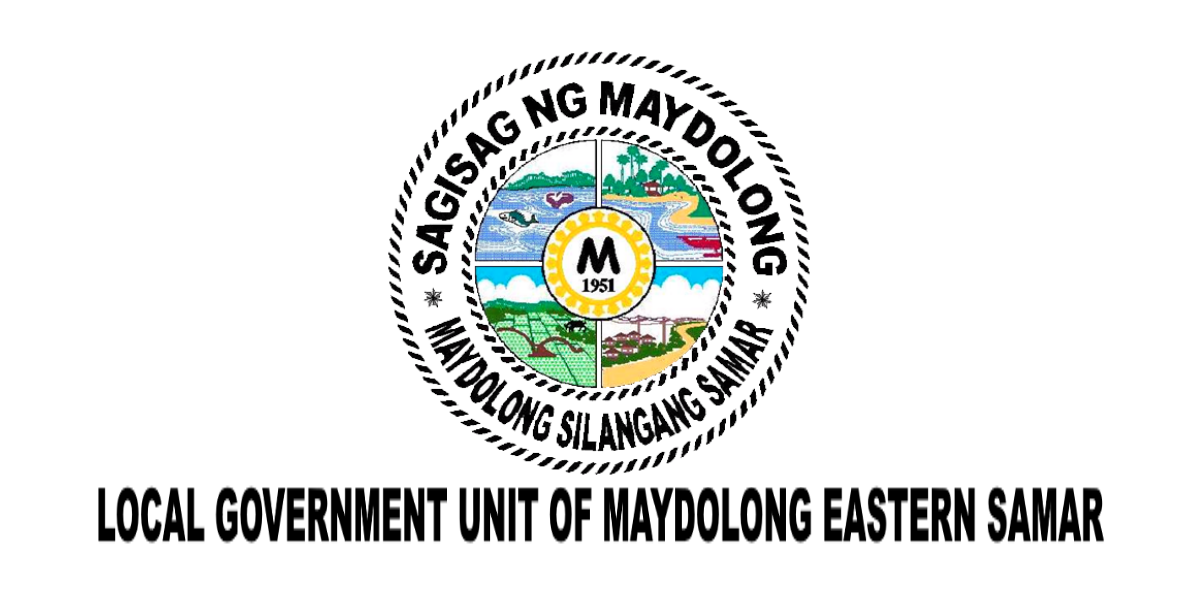
- Flag

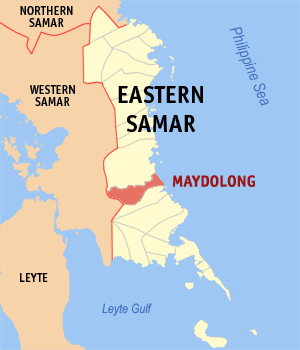
- Map of Eastern Samar with Maydolong highlighted
- Interactive map of Maydolong
- Location within the Philippines
- Coordinates: 11°30′N 125°30′E
- Country: Philippines
- Region: Eastern Visayas
- Province: Eastern Samar
- District: Lone district
- Founded: May 1, 1951
- Barangays: 20 (see Barangays)

Government
  - Type: Sangguniang Bayan
  - Mayor: Louie A. Borja
  - Vice Mayor: Emmanuel M. Garfin
  - Representative: Sheen P. Gonzales
  - Councilors: List: • Jun A. Bajado; • Daniel E. Baldono; • Nancy G. Camora; • Marissa L. Titular; • Victor Augustus B. Afable; • Gilberto B. Colima; • Marifel T. Garado; • Jeric Nelson A. Montes; DILG Masterlist of Officials
  - Electorate: 11,669 voters (2025)

Area
  - Total: 399.63 km^{2} (154.30 sq mi)
- Elevation: 18 m (59 ft)
- Highest elevation: 153 m (502 ft)
- Lowest elevation: 0 m (0 ft)

Population (2024 census)
  - Total: 15,456
  - Density: 38.676/km^{2} (100.17/sq mi)
  - Households: 3,562

Economy
  - Income class: 2nd municipal income class
  - Poverty incidence: 31.64% (2023)
  - Revenue: ₱ 193.2 million (2024)
  - Assets: ₱ 491.1 million (2024)
  - Expenditure: ₱ 162.3 million (2024)
  - Liabilities: ₱ 52.3 million (2020), 44.05 million (2024)

Service provider
  - Electricity: Eastern Samar Electric Cooperative (ESAMELCO)
- Time zone: UTC+8 (PST)
- ZIP code: 6802
- PSGC: 0802615000
- IDD : area code: +63 (0)55
- Native languages: Waray; Tagalog
- Website: www.maydolong-esamar.gov.ph

Maydolong, officially the Municipality of Maydolong (Waray: Bungto han Maydolong; Tagalog: Bayan ng Maydolong), is a municipality in the province of Eastern Samar, Philippines. According to the 2024 census, it has a population of 15,456 people.

== Etymology ==
The story officially accepted by the Sangguniang Bayan is that fishermen once traveled to the village of Matnog. Because they needed to rest along the east coast of Samar, they used to say "Matnog it Dolong" ("the bow must point to Matnog"). This was shortened to Maydolong and eventually became the village's name.

== Subdivision ==
Maydolong once comprised the barrios Maydolong, Balogo, Maybocog, Omawas, Tagaslian, Kampakirit, Suribao, Mayburak, Kanmanungdong, Malobago, Tabi, Maytigbao and Kanluterio, and belonged to the Municipality of Borongan, Eastern Samar. It is now politically subdivided into 20 barangays. Each has puroks and some have sitios.

- Camada
- Campakerit (Botay)
- Canloterio
- Del Pilar
- Guindalitan
- Lapgap
- Malobago
- Maybocog
- Maytigbao
- Omawas
- Patag
- Barangay Poblacion 1
- Barangay Poblacion 2
- Barangay Poblacion 3
- Barangay Poblacion 4
- Barangay Poblacion 5
- Barangay Poblacion 6
- Barangay Poblacion 7
- San Gabriel
- Tagaslian

== Climate ==
Climate data for Maydolong, Eastern Samar
Month	Jan	Feb	Mar	Apr	May	Jun	Jul	Aug	Sep	Oct	Nov	Dec	Year
Mean daily maximum °C (°F)	27 (81)	28 (82)	28 (82)	30 (86)	30 (86)	30 (86)	29 (84)	29 (84)	29 (84)	29 (84)	28 (82)	28 (82)	29 (84)
Mean daily minimum °C (°F)	22 (72)	22 (72)	22 (72)	23 (73)	24 (75)	24 (75)	24 (75)	24 (75)	24 (75)	24 (75)	23 (73)	23 (73)	23 (74)
Average precipitation mm (inches)	114 (4.5)	81 (3.2)	94 (3.7)	81 (3.2)	119 (4.7)	192 (7.6)	186 (7.3)	158 (6.2)	167 (6.6)	185 (7.3)	202 (8.0)	176 (6.9)	1,755 (69.2)
Average rainy days	18.6	14.7	16.8	17.8	22.3	25.9	27.5	26.2	26.6	27.0	24.6	22.3	270.3
Source: Meteoblue

== Demographics ==
Population census of Maydolong
Year	Pop.	±% p.a.
1960	7,827	—
1970	8,424	+0.74%
1975	12,317	+7.92%
1980	11,353	−1.62%
1990	10,656	−0.63%
1995	12,201	+2.57%
2000	11,741	−0.82%
2007	12,766	+1.16%
2010	13,614	+2.37%
2015	14,743	+1.53%
2020	15,314	+0.80%
2024	15,456	+0.22%
Source: Philippine Statistics Authority

The population of Maydolong in the 2024 census was 15,456 people, with a density of 39 inhabitants per square kilometre or 100 inhabitants per square mile.

== Economy ==
Poverty incidence of Maydolong

Source: Philippine Statistics Authority
