= Mercedes, Eastern Samar =

Municipality in Eastern Samar, Philippines

Mercedes
- Municipality
- Municipality of Mercedes
- Seal

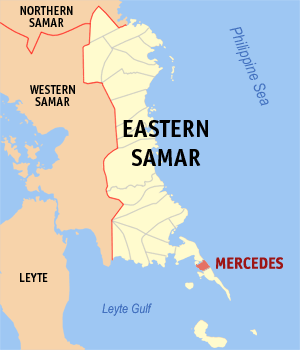
- Map of Eastern Samar with Mercedes highlighted
- Interactive map of Mercedes
- Location within the Philippines
- Coordinates: 11°05′58″N 125°42′33″E
- Country: Philippines
- Region: Eastern Visayas
- Province: Eastern Samar
- District: Lone district
- Founded: 1948
- Barangays: 16 (see Barangays)

Government
  - Type: Sangguniang Bayan
  - Mayor: Edwin B. Quiminales
  - Vice Mayor: Jose P. Talagag
  - Representative: Maria Fe R. Abunda
  - Councilors: List: • Lucia R. Abong; • Alfredo Q. Estor; • Clodualdo C. Navidad; • Zacarias M. Naldo; • Remberto H. Macapugas; • Roque M. Abringe; • Ianne June M. Evans; • Primitivo B. Waniwan; DILG Masterlist of Officials
  - Electorate: 6,297 voters (2025)

Area
  - Total: 23.32 km^{2} (9.00 sq mi)
- Elevation: 13 m (43 ft)
- Highest elevation: 132 m (433 ft)
- Lowest elevation: 0 m (0 ft)

Population (2024 census)
  - Total: 6,114
  - Density: 262.2/km^{2} (679.0/sq mi)
  - Households: 1,620

Economy
  - Income class: 5th municipal income class
  - Poverty incidence: 30.01% (2023)
  - Revenue: ₱ 71.43 million (2024)
  - Assets: ₱ 248.4 million (2024)
  - Expenditure: ₱ 77.62 million (2024)
  - Liabilities: ₱ 130.7 million (2024)

Service provider
  - Electricity: Eastern Samar Electric Cooperative (ESAMELCO)
- Time zone: UTC+8 (PST)
- ZIP code: 6808
- PSGC: 0802616000
- IDD : area code: +63 (0)55
- Native languages: Waray; Tagalog
- Website: www.mercedes-esamar.gov.ph

Mercedes (IPA: [ˌmɛrˈsɛdɛs]; Waray: Bungto han Mercedes, Tagalog: Bayan ng Mercedes), officially the Municipality of Mercedes, is a municipality in the province of Eastern Samar, Philippines. According to the 2024 census, it has a population of 6,114 people.

Act No. 960 of the Philippine Commission incorporated the town of Mercedes comprising the barrios of Busay, Anoron, Sungan, Bobon, Banoyo and Boyayawon into Guiuan. In 1948, Republic Act No. 262 recreated the town.

== Geography ==
=== Barangays ===
Mercedes is politically subdivided into 16 barangays. Each barangay consists of puroks and some have sitios.

- Anuron
- Banuyo
- Bobon
- Busay
- Buyayawon
- Cabunga-an
- Cambante
- Palamrag (Cabiliri-an)
- Barangay 1 Poblacion
- Barangay 2 Poblacion
- Barangay 3 Poblacion
- Barangay 4 Poblacion
- Port Kennedy
- San Jose
- San Roque
- Sung-an

=== Climate ===
Climate data for Mercedes, Eastern Samar
Month	Jan	Feb	Mar	Apr	May	Jun	Jul	Aug	Sep	Oct	Nov	Dec	Year
Mean daily maximum °C (°F)	28 (82)	28 (82)	29 (84)	30 (86)	30 (86)	30 (86)	29 (84)	30 (86)	30 (86)	29 (84)	29 (84)	28 (82)	29 (84)
Mean daily minimum °C (°F)	22 (72)	22 (72)	22 (72)	23 (73)	24 (75)	24 (75)	24 (75)	24 (75)	24 (75)	24 (75)	23 (73)	23 (73)	23 (74)
Average precipitation mm (inches)	90 (3.5)	67 (2.6)	82 (3.2)	70 (2.8)	97 (3.8)	145 (5.7)	152 (6.0)	127 (5.0)	132 (5.2)	152 (6.0)	169 (6.7)	144 (5.7)	1,427 (56.2)
Average rainy days	17.0	13.5	16.0	16.5	20.6	24.3	26.0	25.4	25.2	26.4	23.0	21.1	255
Source: Meteoblue

== Demographics ==
Population census of Mercedes
Year	Pop.	±% p.a.
1903	2,681	—
1948	5,265	+1.51%
1960	6,424	+1.67%
1970	4,605	−3.27%
1975	3,846	−3.55%
1980	4,848	+4.74%
1990	4,505	−0.73%
1995	5,473	+3.71%
2000	4,857	−2.53%
2007	5,041	+0.51%
2010	5,369	+2.32%
2015	6,070	+2.36%
2020	6,112	+0.15%
2024	6,114	+0.01%
Source: Philippine Statistics Authority

The population of Mercedes in the 2024 census was 6,114 people, with a density of 260 inhabitants per square kilometre or 670 inhabitants per square mile.

== Economy ==
Poverty incidence of Mercedes (%)

Source: Philippine Statistics Authority
