= General MacArthur, Eastern Samar =

Municipality in Eastern Samar, Philippines

General MacArthur
- Municipality
- Municipality of General MacArthur
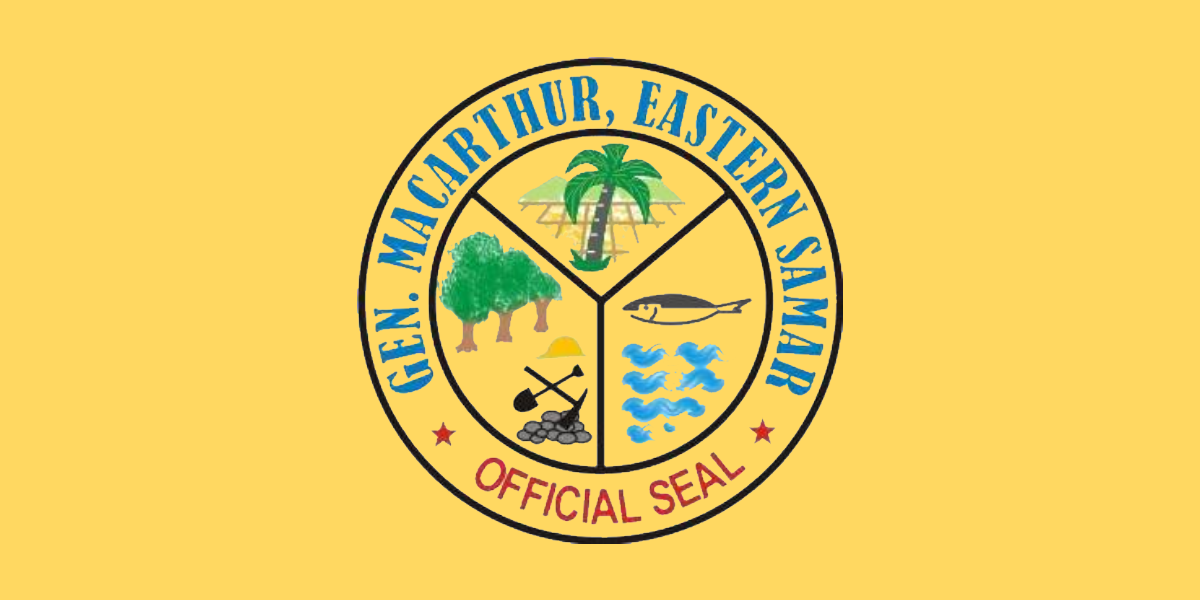
- Flag

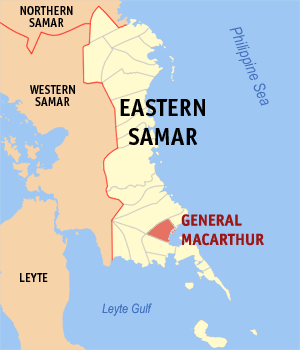
- Map of Eastern Samar with General MacArthur highlighted
- Interactive map of General MacArthur
- Location within the Philippines
- Coordinates: 11°14′55″N 125°32′24″E
- Country: Philippines
- Region: Eastern Visayas
- Province: Eastern Samar
- District: Lone district
- Founded: June 22, 1947
- Named for: Douglas MacArthur
- Barangays: 30 (see Barangays)

Government
  - Type: Sangguniang Bayan
  - Mayor: Flora C. Ty
  - Vice Mayor: Joel D. Baldo
  - Representative: Maria Fe R. Abunda
  - Councilors: List: • Edgar S. Alday; • Lucio Rineil T. Monteclaro; • Debbie Dawn P. Pajares; • Daniel P. Dagale; • Amelita N. Thong; • Emerita R. Go; • Elvira A. Navidad; • Rogelio A. Ida; DILG Masterlist of Officials
  - Electorate: 10,705 voters (2025)

Area
  - Total: 117.29 km^{2} (45.29 sq mi)
- Elevation: 51 m (167 ft)
- Highest elevation: 268 m (879 ft)
- Lowest elevation: 0 m (0 ft)

Population (2024 census)
  - Total: 14,606
  - Density: 124.53/km^{2} (322.53/sq mi)
  - Households: 3,325

Economy
  - Income class: 4th municipal income class
  - Poverty incidence: 37.19% (2023)
  - Revenue: ₱ 119.1 million (2024)
  - Assets: ₱ 251.9 million (2024)
  - Expenditure: ₱ 128.3 million (2024)
  - Liabilities: ₱ 85.69 million (2024)

Service provider
  - Electricity: Eastern Samar Electric Cooperative (ESAMELCO)
- Time zone: UTC+8 (PST)
- ZIP code: 6805
- PSGC: 0802607000
- IDD : area code: +63 (0)55
- Native languages: Waray; Tagalog
- Website: www.general-macarthur-esamar.gov.ph

General MacArthur (IPA pronunciation in Waray-waray: [ˈdʒɛnɛral ˌmɐkˈʔaɾtur]), officially the Municipality of General MacArthur (Waray: Bungto han General MacArthur; Tagalog: Bayan ng General MacArthur), is a municipality in the province of Eastern Samar, Philippines. According to the 2024 census, it has a population of 14,606 people.

The town was created from the barrios of Pambujan Sur, Calutan, San Isidro, Vigan, Binalay, Camcueves, Domrog and Pingan of the town of Hernani by virtue of Republic Act No. 193, enacted on June 22, 1947. It was created in honor of General Douglas MacArthur, who was instrumental in the victory of the Battle of Leyte Gulf during World War II.

== Barangays ==
General MacArthur is politically subdivided into 30 barangays. Each barangay consists of puroks and some have sitios.

- Aguinaldo
- Alang-alang
- Binalay
- Calutan
- Camcuevas
- Domrog
- Limbujan
- Macapagal
- Magsaysay
- Osmeña
- Pingan
- Poblacion Barangay 1
- Poblacion Barangay 2
- Poblacion Barangay 3
- Poblacion Barangay 4
- Poblacion Barangay 5
- Poblacion Barangay 6
- Poblacion Barangay 7
- Poblacion Barangay 8
- Laurel
- Roxas
- Quezon
- Quirino
- San Isidro
- San Roque
- Santa Cruz (Opong)
- Santa Fe
- Tandang Sora
- Tugop
- Vigan

== Demographics ==
Population census of General MacArthur
Year	Pop.	±% p.a.
1948	6,832	—
1960	7,662	+0.96%
1970	8,026	+0.46%
1975	9,040	+2.41%
1980	7,937	−2.57%
1990	9,627	+1.95%
1995	10,041	+0.79%
2000	10,452	+0.86%
2007	11,625	+1.48%
2010	12,214	+1.81%
2015	14,550	+3.39%
2020	14,411	−0.20%
2024	14,606	+0.32%
Source: Philippine Statistics Authority

The population of General MacArthur, Eastern Samar, in the 2024 census was 14,606 people, with a density of 120 inhabitants per square kilometre or 310 inhabitants per square mile.

== Climate ==
Climate data for General MacArthur, Eastern Samar
Month	Jan	Feb	Mar	Apr	May	Jun	Jul	Aug	Sep	Oct	Nov	Dec	Year
Mean daily maximum °C (°F)	28 (82)	28 (82)	29 (84)	30 (86)	30 (86)	30 (86)	29 (84)	30 (86)	30 (86)	29 (84)	29 (84)	28 (82)	29 (84)
Mean daily minimum °C (°F)	22 (72)	22 (72)	22 (72)	23 (73)	24 (75)	24 (75)	24 (75)	24 (75)	24 (75)	24 (75)	23 (73)	23 (73)	23 (74)
Average precipitation mm (inches)	90 (3.5)	67 (2.6)	82 (3.2)	70 (2.8)	97 (3.8)	145 (5.7)	152 (6.0)	127 (5.0)	132 (5.2)	152 (6.0)	169 (6.7)	144 (5.7)	1,427 (56.2)
Average rainy days	17.0	13.5	16.0	16.5	20.6	24.3	26.0	25.4	25.2	26.4	23.0	21.1	255
Source: Meteoblue

== Economy ==
Poverty incidence of General MacArthur (%)

Source: Philippine Statistics Authority
