= Balangkayan =

Municipality in Eastern Samar, Philippines

- Municipality
- Municipality of Balangkayan
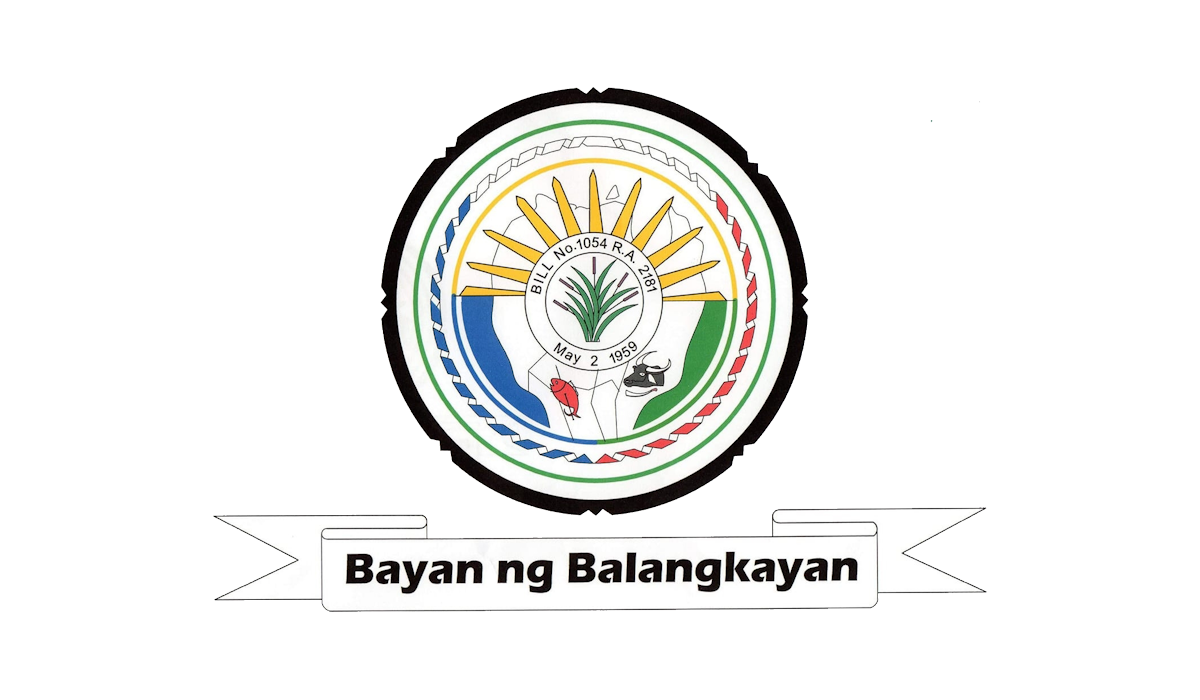
- Flag

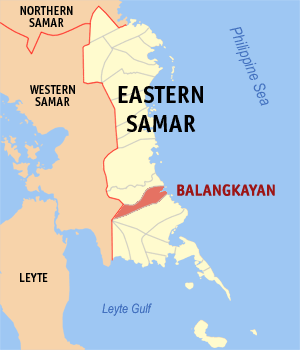
- Map of Eastern Samar with Balangkayan highlighted
- Interactive map of Balangkayan
- Location within the Philippines
- Coordinates: 11°28′22″N 125°30′39″E
- Country: Philippines
- Region: Eastern Visayas
- Province: Eastern Samar
- District: Lone district
- Barangays: 15 (see Barangays)

Government
  - Type: Sangguniang Bayan
  - Mayor: Allan C. Contado
  - Vice Mayor: Alice G. Abunales
  - Representative: Maria Fe R. Abunda
  - Councilors: List: • Cleofe C. Caratay; • Nerafie G. Contado; • Dadit V. Gesite; • Mathew D. Gesite; • Anelyn G. Lacaba; • Allahnah May B. Glino; • Ernesto C. Yadao; • Jose B. Glino; DILG Masterlist of Officials
  - Electorate: 7,924 voters (2025)

Area
  - Total: 207.05 km^{2} (79.94 sq mi)
- Elevation: 16 m (52 ft)
- Highest elevation: 137 m (449 ft)
- Lowest elevation: 0 m (0 ft)

Population (2024 census)
  - Total: 10,014
  - Density: 48.365/km^{2} (125.27/sq mi)
  - Households: 2,464

Economy
  - Income class: 4th municipal income class
  - Poverty incidence: 33.31% (2023)
  - Revenue: ₱ 129.3 million (2024)
  - Assets: ₱ 356.6 million (2024)
  - Expenditure: ₱ 133.8 million (2024)
  - Liabilities: ₱ 90.13 million (2024)

Service provider
  - Electricity: Eastern Samar Electric Cooperative (ESAMELCO)
- Time zone: UTC+8 (PST)
- ZIP code: 6801
- PSGC: 0802603000
- IDD : area code: +63 (0)55
- Native languages: Waray; Tagalog
- Website: www.balangkayan-esamar.gov.ph

Balangkayan (IPA: [ˌbalaŋˈkajan]), officially the Municipality of Balangkayan (Waray: Bungto han Balangkayan; Tagalog: Bayan ng Balangkayan), is a municipality in the province of Eastern Samar, Philippines. According to the 2024 census, it has a population of 10,014 people.

== Geography ==
=== Barangays ===
Balangkayan is politically subdivided into 15 barangays. Each barangay consists of puroks and some have sitios.

- Balogo
- Bangon
- Cabay
- Caisawan
- Cantubi
- General Malvar
- Guinpoliran
- Julag
- Magsaysay
- Maramag
- Poblacion I
- Poblacion II
- Poblacion III
- Poblacion IV
- Poblacion V

=== Climate ===
Climate data for Balangkayan, Eastern Samar
Month	Jan	Feb	Mar	Apr	May	Jun	Jul	Aug	Sep	Oct	Nov	Dec	Year
Mean daily maximum °C (°F)	28 (82)	28 (82)	29 (84)	30 (86)	30 (86)	30 (86)	29 (84)	30 (86)	30 (86)	29 (84)	29 (84)	28 (82)	29 (84)
Mean daily minimum °C (°F)	22 (72)	22 (72)	22 (72)	23 (73)	24 (75)	24 (75)	24 (75)	24 (75)	24 (75)	24 (75)	23 (73)	23 (73)	23 (74)
Average precipitation mm (inches)	90 (3.5)	67 (2.6)	82 (3.2)	70 (2.8)	97 (3.8)	145 (5.7)	152 (6.0)	127 (5.0)	132 (5.2)	152 (6.0)	169 (6.7)	144 (5.7)	1,427 (56.2)
Average rainy days	17.0	13.5	16.0	16.5	20.6	24.3	26.0	25.4	25.2	26.4	23.0	21.1	255
Source: Meteoblue

== Demographics ==
Population census of Balangkayan
Year	Pop.	±% p.a.
1960	4,615	—
1970	5,557	+1.87%
1975	7,671	+6.68%
1980	8,703	+2.56%
1990	7,609	−1.33%
1995	8,849	+2.87%
2000	8,134	−1.79%
2007	8,249	+0.19%
2010	9,046	+3.41%
2015	10,125	+2.17%
2020	10,185	+0.12%
2024	10,014	−0.41%
Source: Philippine Statistics Authority

In the 2024 census, the population of Balangkayan was 10,014 people, with a density of 48 inhabitants per square kilometre or 120 inhabitants per square mile.

== Economy ==
Poverty incidence of Balangkayan

Source: Philippine Statistics Authority

== Tourism ==
The Minasangay Island Marine Ecological Park and Resort known for its cliff diving, scuba diving, mangroves and coral reefs is a popular gateway for the locals of the province.

== Education ==
Balangkayan has many elementary schools and secondary schools.

Elementary schools:

- Balangkayan Central Elementary School
- Balogo Elementary School
- Cabay Elementary School
- Caisawan Elementary School
- Guinpoliran Elementary School
- Maramag Elementary School
- Talisay Elementary School

Secondary school:

- Balangkayan National High School
- Balangkayan Senior High School
