= Quinapondan =

Municipality in Eastern Samar, Philippines

- Municipality
- Municipality of Quinapondan
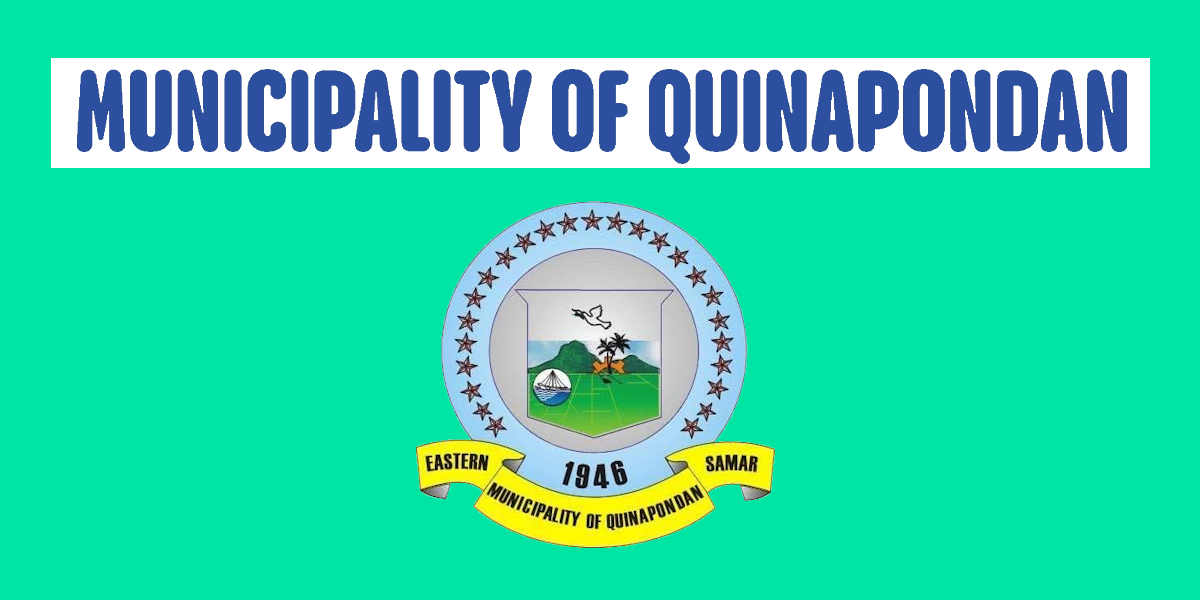
- Flag

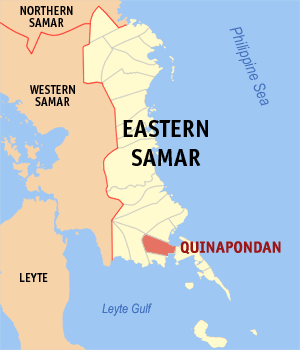
- Map of Eastern Samar with Quinapondan highlighted
- Interactive map of Quinapondan
- Location within the Philippines
- Coordinates: 11°09′28″N 125°31′15″E
- Country: Philippines
- Region: Eastern Visayas
- Province: Eastern Samar
- District: Lone district
- Barangays: 25 (see Barangays)

Government
  - Type: Sangguniang Bayan
  - Mayor: Raffy S. Asebias
  - Vice Mayor: Leo Jasper M. Candido
  - Representative: Maria Fe R. Abunda
  - Councilors: List: • Elena S. Macawile; • Norma Q. Pacaanas; • Lope A. Anguren; • Marlito C. Terencio; • Arliegh D. Aserias; • Nelia B. Germones; • Ma. Susan R. Biong; • Elmer Q. Ripalda; DILG Masterlist of Officials
  - Electorate: 10,908 voters (2025)

Area
  - Total: 83.24 km^{2} (32.14 sq mi)
- Elevation: 45 m (148 ft)
- Highest elevation: 318 m (1,043 ft)
- Lowest elevation: 0 m (0 ft)

Population (2024 census)
  - Total: 14,624
  - Density: 175.7/km^{2} (455.0/sq mi)
  - Households: 3,605

Economy
  - Income class: 4th municipal income class
  - Poverty incidence: 33.8% (2023)
  - Revenue: ₱ 109.6 million (2024)
  - Assets: ₱ 363.2 million (2024)
  - Expenditure: ₱ 136.4 million (2024)
  - Liabilities: ₱ 135.5 million (2024)

Service provider
  - Electricity: Eastern Samar Electric Cooperative (ESAMELCO)
- Time zone: UTC+8 (PST)
- ZIP code: 6808
- PSGC: 0802618000
- IDD : area code: +63 (0)55
- Native languages: Waray; Tagalog
- Website: quinapondan-esamar.gov.ph

Quinapondan (IPA: [ˌkinɐˈpondan]), officially the Municipality of Quinapondan (Waray: Bungto han Quinapondan; Tagalog: Bayan ng Quinapondan), is a municipality in the province of Eastern Samar, Philippines. According to the 2024 census, it has a population of 14,624 people.

== Geography ==
=== Barangays ===
Quinapondan is politically subdivided into 25 barangays. Each barangay consists of puroks and some have sitios.

- Barangay Anislag
- Bagte
- Barangay No. 1 (Poblacion)
- Barangay No. 2 (Poblacion)
- Barangay No. 3 (Poblacion)
- Barangay No. 4 (Poblacion)
- Barangay No. 5 (Poblacion)
- Buenavista
- Caculangan
- Cagdaja
- Cambilla
- Cantenio
- Naga
- Paco
- Rizal (Pana-ugan)
- San Pedro
- San Vicente
- Santa Cruz (Loro Diyo)
- Santa Margarita
- Santo Niño
- Palactad (Valley)
- Alang-alang
- Barangay No. 6 (Poblacion)
- Barangay No. 7 (Poblacion)
- San Isidro

=== Climate ===
Climate data for Quinapondan, Eastern Samar
Month	Jan	Feb	Mar	Apr	May	Jun	Jul	Aug	Sep	Oct	Nov	Dec	Year
Mean daily maximum °C (°F)	28 (82)	28 (82)	29 (84)	30 (86)	30 (86)	30 (86)	29 (84)	30 (86)	30 (86)	29 (84)	29 (84)	28 (82)	29 (84)
Mean daily minimum °C (°F)	22 (72)	22 (72)	22 (72)	23 (73)	24 (75)	24 (75)	24 (75)	24 (75)	24 (75)	24 (75)	23 (73)	23 (73)	23 (74)
Average precipitation mm (inches)	90 (3.5)	67 (2.6)	82 (3.2)	70 (2.8)	97 (3.8)	145 (5.7)	152 (6.0)	127 (5.0)	132 (5.2)	152 (6.0)	169 (6.7)	144 (5.7)	1,427 (56.2)
Average rainy days	17.0	13.5	16.0	16.5	20.6	24.3	26.0	25.4	25.2	26.4	23.0	21.1	255
Source: Meteoblue

== Demographics ==
Population census of Quinapondan
Year	Pop.	±% p.a.
1903	2,194	—
1948	8,204	+2.97%
1960	9,173	+0.93%
1970	9,180	+0.01%
1975	10,530	+2.79%
1980	11,355	+1.52%
1990	10,986	−0.33%
1995	12,644	+2.67%
2000	11,721	−1.61%
2007	12,339	+0.71%
2010	13,841	+4.27%
2015	14,779	+1.26%
2020	14,507	−0.39%
2024	14,624	+0.19%
Source: Philippine Statistics Authority

The population of Quinapondan in the 2024 census was 14,624 people, with a density of 180 inhabitants per square kilometre or 470 inhabitants per square mile.

== Economy ==
Poverty incidence of Quinapondan (%)

Source: Philippine Statistics Authority
