= Jipapad =

Municipality in Eastern Samar, Philippines

- Municipality
- Municipality of Jipapad
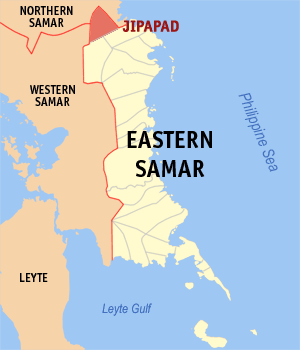
- Map of Eastern Samar with Jipapad highlighted
- Interactive map of Jipapad
- Location within the Philippines
- Coordinates: 12°17′10″N 125°14′06″E
- Country: Philippines
- Region: Eastern Visayas
- Province: Eastern Samar
- District: Lone district
- Established: March 5, 1919 (as a municipal district); July 1, 1964 (as a regular municipality)
- Barangays: 13 (see Barangays)

Government
  - Type: Sangguniang Bayan
  - Mayor: Benjamin E. Ver
  - Vice Mayor: Oscar Amigo
  - Representative: Maria Fe R. Abunda
  - Councilors: List: • Antonio Ada; • Baying Norcio; • Tammy Recare; • Julian Engo; • Hans Pecayo; • Malou Tomenio; • Joel Lomuntad; • Elsa Oros
  - Electorate: 7,564 voters (2025)

Area
  - Total: 234.8 km^{2} (90.7 sq mi)
- Elevation: 51 m (167 ft)
- Highest elevation: 177 m (581 ft)
- Lowest elevation: 5 m (16 ft)

Population (2024 census)
  - Total: 8,726
  - Density: 37.16/km^{2} (96.25/sq mi)
  - Households: 1,941

Economy
  - Income class: 4th municipal income class
  - Poverty incidence: 38.96% (2023)
  - Revenue: ₱ 128.3 million (2024)
  - Assets: ₱ 352.7 million (2024)
  - Expenditure: ₱ 131.8 million (2024)
  - Liabilities: ₱ 55.72 million (2024)

Service provider
  - Electricity: Eastern Samar Electric Cooperative (ESAMELCO)
- Time zone: UTC+8 (PST)
- ZIP code: 6804
- PSGC: 0802611000
- IDD : area code: +63 (0)55
- Native languages: Waray; Tagalog
- Website: www.jipapad-esamar.gov.ph

Jipapad, officially the Municipality of Jipapad (Waray: Bungto han Jipapad; Tagalog: Bayan ng Jipapad), is a municipality in the province of Eastern Samar, Philippines. According to the 2024 census, it has a population of 8,726 people.

== Barangays ==
Jipapad is politically subdivided into 13 barangays. Each barangay consists of puroks and some have sitios.

- Agsaman
- Cagmanaba
- Dorillo
- Jewaran
- Mabuhay
- Magsaysay
- Barangay 1 (Poblacion)
- Barangay 2 (Poblacion)
- Barangay 3 (Poblacion)
- Barangay 4 (Poblacion)
- Recare
- Roxas
- San Roque

== Demographics ==
Population census of Jipapad
Year	Pop.	±% p.a.
1918	17,013	—
1939	1,347	−11.38%
1948	2,005	+4.52%
1960	2,201	+0.78%
1970	3,769	+5.52%
1975	4,497	+3.61%
1980	4,586	+0.39%
1990	5,207	+1.28%
1995	6,222	+3.39%
2000	6,596	+1.26%
2007	6,882	+0.59%
2010	7,397	+2.66%
2015	7,885	+1.22%
2020	8,439	+1.44%
2024	8,726	+0.81%
Source: Philippine Statistics Authority

The population of Jipapad in the 2024 census was 8,726 people, with a density of 37 inhabitants per square kilometre or 96 inhabitants per square mile.

== Climate ==
Climate data for Jipapad, Eastern Samar
Month	Jan	Feb	Mar	Apr	May	Jun	Jul	Aug	Sep	Oct	Nov	Dec	Year
Mean daily maximum °C (°F)	27 (81)	27 (81)	28 (82)	29 (84)	30 (86)	30 (86)	29 (84)	29 (84)	29 (84)	29 (84)	28 (82)	28 (82)	29 (83)
Mean daily minimum °C (°F)	22 (72)	22 (72)	22 (72)	23 (73)	24 (75)	24 (75)	24 (75)	24 (75)	24 (75)	24 (75)	23 (73)	23 (73)	23 (74)
Average precipitation mm (inches)	105 (4.1)	67 (2.6)	65 (2.6)	53 (2.1)	86 (3.4)	129 (5.1)	135 (5.3)	113 (4.4)	131 (5.2)	163 (6.4)	167 (6.6)	162 (6.4)	1,376 (54.2)
Average rainy days	17.6	13.2	15.5	14.9	19.6	24.3	26.6	25.4	24.9	25.4	22.9	20.9	251.2
Source: Meteoblue

== Economy ==
Poverty incidence of Jipapad (%)

Source: Philippine Statistics Authority
