= Arteche =

Municipality in Eastern Samar, Philippines

- Municipality
- Municipality of Arteche
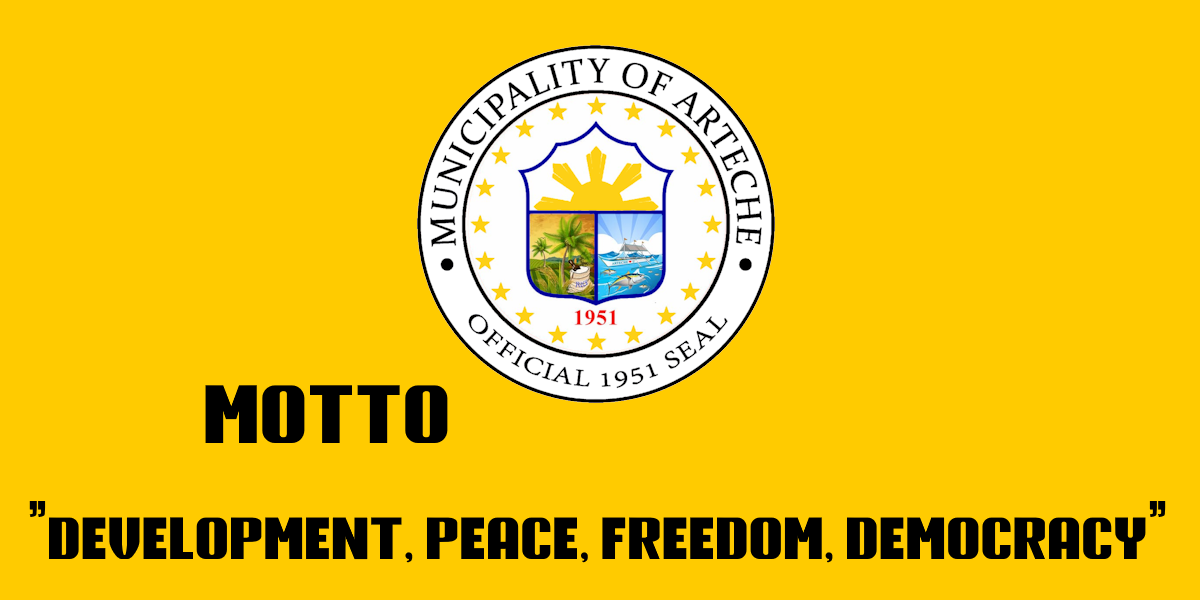
- Flag

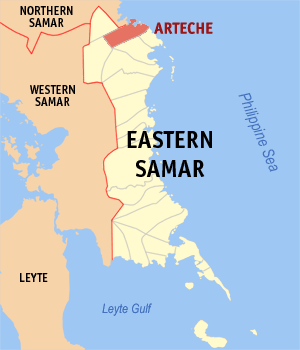
- Map of Eastern Samar with Arteche highlighted
- Interactive map of Arteche
- Location within the Philippines
- Coordinates: 12°16′10″N 125°22′16″E
- Country: Philippines
- Region: Eastern Visayas
- Province: Eastern Samar
- District: Lone district
- Founded: 1950
- Barangays: 20 (see Barangays)

Government
  - Type: Sangguniang Bayan
  - Mayor: Roland Boie M. Evardone
  - Vice Mayor: Rolando B. Evardone
  - Representative: Maria Fe R. Abunda
  - Councilors: List: • Ralph Adrian T. Ramos; • Marissa M. Dalit; • George E. Pajanustan; • Antonio B. Evardone; • Restituta A. Nuguit; • Natalio A. Orsal; • Adulf M. Panajustan; • Jerico S. Moscosa; DILG Masterlist of Officials
  - Electorate: 12,160 voters (2025)

Area
  - Total: 169.82 km^{2} (65.57 sq mi)
- Elevation: 27 m (89 ft)
- Highest elevation: 124 m (407 ft)
- Lowest elevation: 0 m (0 ft)

Population (2024 census)
  - Total: 16,648
  - Density: 98.033/km^{2} (253.90/sq mi)
  - Households: 3,908

Economy
  - Income class: 4th municipal income class
  - Poverty incidence: 35.57% (2023)
  - Revenue: ₱ 177.1 million (2024)
  - Assets: ₱ 518.5 million (2024)
  - Expenditure: ₱ 130 million (2024)
  - Liabilities: ₱ 224 million (2024)

Service provider
  - Electricity: Eastern Samar Electric Cooperative (ESAMELCO)
- Time zone: UTC+8 (PST)
- ZIP code: 6822
- PSGC: 0802601000
- IDD : area code: +63 (0)55
- Native languages: Waray; Tagalog
- Website: www.arteche-esamar.gov.ph

Arteche (IPA: [arˈtɛtʃe]), officially the Municipality of Arteche (Waray: Bungto han Arteche; Tagalog: Bayan ng Arteche), is a municipality in the province of Eastern Samar, Philippines. According to the 2024 census, it has a population of 16,648 people.

In the southeast, it is bounded by San Policarpo, to the south by Oras. To the north, it is bounded by Pacific Ocean and in the north-west by Lapinig, and a neighbor of Maslog.

== History ==
Arteche was created in 1950 from the barrios of San Ramon, Carapdapan, Beri, Tangbo, Catumsan, Bego, Concepcion, Casidman, Tawagan, and Tibalawon of the Municipality of Oras.

== Geography ==
=== Barangays ===
Arteche is politically subdivided into 20 barangays. Each barangay consists of puroks and some have sitios.

- Aguinaldo
- Balud (Poblacion)
- Bato (San Luis)
- Beri
- Bigo
- Buenavista
- Cagsalay
- Campacion
- Carapdapan
- Casidman
- Catumsan
- Central (Poblacion)
- Concepcion
- Garden (Poblacion)
- Inayawan
- Macarthur
- Rawis (Poblacion)
- Tangbo
- Tawagan
- Tebalawon

=== Climate ===
Climate data for Arteche, Eastern Samar
Month	Jan	Feb	Mar	Apr	May	Jun	Jul	Aug	Sep	Oct	Nov	Dec	Year
Mean daily maximum °C (°F)	27 (81)	27 (81)	28 (82)	29 (84)	30 (86)	30 (86)	30 (86)	30 (86)	29 (84)	29 (84)	28 (82)	27 (81)	29 (84)
Mean daily minimum °C (°F)	23 (73)	22 (72)	22 (72)	23 (73)	24 (75)	24 (75)	24 (75)	24 (75)	24 (75)	24 (75)	24 (75)	23 (73)	23 (74)
Average precipitation mm (inches)	105 (4.1)	67 (2.6)	65 (2.6)	53 (2.1)	86 (3.4)	129 (5.1)	135 (5.3)	113 (4.4)	131 (5.2)	163 (6.4)	167 (6.6)	162 (6.4)	1,376 (54.2)
Average rainy days	17.6	13.2	15.5	14.9	19.6	24.3	26.6	25.4	24.9	25.4	22.9	20.9	251.2
Source: Meteoblue

== Demographics ==
Population census of Arteche
Year	Pop.	±% p.a.
1960	8,647	—
1970	9,330	+0.76%
1975	10,246	+1.90%
1980	11,686	+2.66%
1990	11,245	−0.38%
1995	12,538	+2.06%
2000	13,024	+0.82%
2007	14,354	+1.35%
2010	15,164	+2.02%
2015	16,026	+1.06%
2020	16,360	+0.44%
2024	16,648	+0.42%
Source: Philippine Statistics Authority

In the 2024 census, the population of Arteche was 16,648 people, with a density of 98 inhabitants per square kilometre or 250 inhabitants per square mile.

== Economy ==
Poverty incidence of Arteche

Source: Philippine Statistics Authority
