= Can-avid =

Municipality in Eastern Samar, Philippines

- Municipality
- Municipality of Can-avid
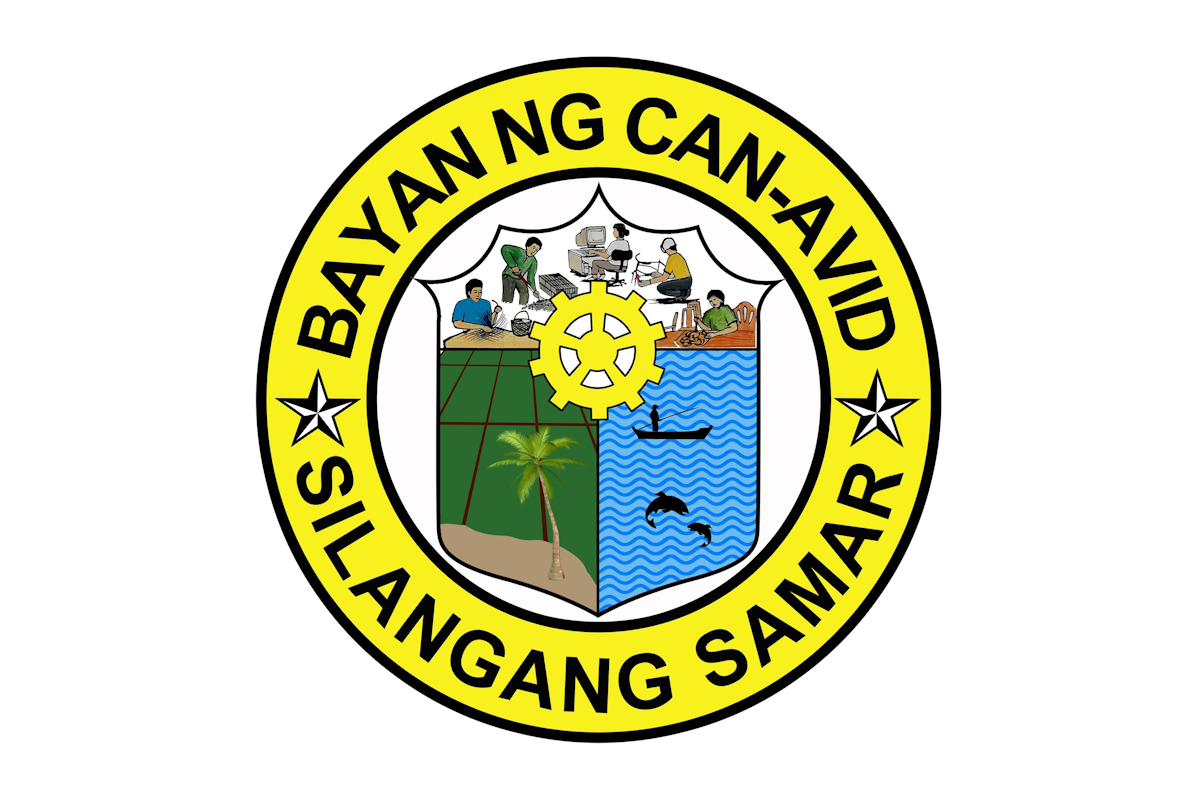
- Flag
- Motto: Upai Can-avid... Upayon Ta, Panlawas, Agrikultura ngan mga Industriya han Can-avid
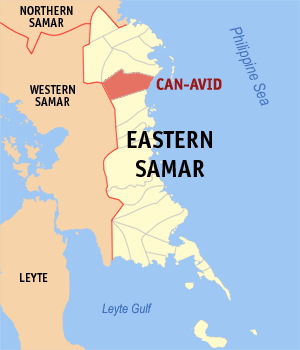
- Map of Eastern Samar with Can-avid highlighted
- Interactive map of Can-avid
- Location within the Philippines
- Coordinates: 12°00′N 125°27′E
- Country: Philippines
- Region: Eastern Visayas
- Province: Eastern Samar
- District: Lone district
- Founded: July 4, 1948
- Barangays: 28 (see Barangays)

Government
  - Type: Sangguniang Bayan
  - Mayor: Gil Norman P. Germino
  - Vice Mayor: Vilma A. Germino
  - Representative: Maria Fe R. Abunda
  - Councilors: List: • Wilfredo B. Busa; • Norberto C. Hobayan; • Gil A. Cebrero; • Brando G. Gulferic; • Milven C. Coso; • Salvador C. Busa; • Omer J. Obiena; • Pia C. Elgera; DILG Masterlist of Officials
  - Electorate: 17,166 voters (2025)

Area
  - Total: 288.7 km^{2} (111.5 sq mi)
- Elevation: 14 m (46 ft)
- Highest elevation: 105 m (344 ft)
- Lowest elevation: 0 m (0 ft)

Population (2024 census)
  - Total: 21,942
  - Density: 76.00/km^{2} (196.8/sq mi)
  - Households: 5,102

Economy
  - Income class: 2nd municipal income class
  - Poverty incidence: 33.11% (2023)
  - Revenue: ₱ 177.2 million (2024)
  - Assets: ₱ 859 million (2024)
  - Expenditure: ₱ 181 million (2024)
  - Liabilities: ₱ 461.9 million (2024)

Service provider
  - Electricity: Eastern Samar Electric Cooperative (ESAMELCO)
- Time zone: UTC+8 (PST)
- ZIP code: 6806
- PSGC: 0802605000
- IDD : area code: +63 (0)55
- Native languages: Waray; Tagalog
- Website: www.can-avid-esamar.gov.ph

Can-avid (IPA: [ˌkɐnˈʔavɪd]), officially the Municipality of Can-avid (Waray: Bungto han Can-avid; Tagalog: Bayan ng Can-avid), is a municipality in the province of Eastern Samar, Philippines. According to the 2024 census, it has a population of 21,942 people.

== History ==
Can-avid was created in 1948 from the barrios of Can-avid, Carolina, Barok, Cansangaya, Mabuhay, Camantang, Canilay, Pandol and Balagon, formerly part of Dolores, Eastern Samar, by virtue of Republic Act No. 264.

== Geography ==
=== Barangays ===
Can-avid is politically subdivided into 28 barangays. Each barangay consists of puroks and some have sitios.

- Balagon
- Baruk
- Boco
- Caghalong
- Camantang
- Can-ilay
- Cansangaya
- Canteros
- Carolina
- Guibuangan
- Jepaco
- Mabuhay
- Malogo
- Obong
- Pandol
- Barangay 1 Poblacion
- Barangay 2 Poblacion
- Barangay 3 Poblacion
- Barangay 4 Poblacion
- Barangay 5 Poblacion
- Barangay 6 Poblacion
- Barangay 7 Poblacion
- Barangay 8 Poblacion
- Barangay 9 Poblacion
- Barangay 10 Poblacion
- Salvacion
- Solong
- Rawis

=== Climate ===
Climate data for Can-avid, Eastern Samar
Month	Jan	Feb	Mar	Apr	May	Jun	Jul	Aug	Sep	Oct	Nov	Dec	Year
Mean daily maximum °C (°F)	27 (81)	27 (81)	28 (82)	29 (84)	30 (86)	30 (86)	29 (84)	29 (84)	29 (84)	29 (84)	28 (82)	28 (82)	29 (83)
Mean daily minimum °C (°F)	22 (72)	22 (72)	22 (72)	23 (73)	24 (75)	24 (75)	24 (75)	24 (75)	24 (75)	24 (75)	23 (73)	23 (73)	23 (74)
Average precipitation mm (inches)	97 (3.8)	64 (2.5)	69 (2.7)	58 (2.3)	98 (3.9)	161 (6.3)	167 (6.6)	140 (5.5)	158 (6.2)	171 (6.7)	169 (6.7)	154 (6.1)	1,506 (59.3)
Average rainy days	17.1	13.4	14.8	15.2	21.1	25.2	26.8	25.4	25.5	26.5	23.0	20.3	254.3
Source: Meteoblue (Use with caution: this is modeled/calculated data, not measured locally.)

== Demographics ==
Population census of Can-avid
Year	Pop.	±% p.a.
1948	5,987	—
1960	8,409	+2.87%
1970	9,695	+1.43%
1975	11,135	+2.82%
1980	12,196	+1.84%
1990	13,254	+0.84%
1995	15,759	+3.30%
2000	17,228	+1.93%
2007	18,173	+0.74%
2010	19,785	+3.14%
2015	21,015	+1.16%
2020	21,682	+0.66%
2024	21,942	+0.29%
Source: Philippine Statistics Authority

In the 2024 census, the population of Can-avid was 21,942 people, with a density of 76 inhabitants per square kilometre or 200 inhabitants per square mile.

== Economy ==
Poverty incidence of Can-avid (%)

Source: Philippine Statistics Authority
