= Giporlos =

Municipality in Eastern Samar, Philippines

- Municipality
- Municipality of Giporlos
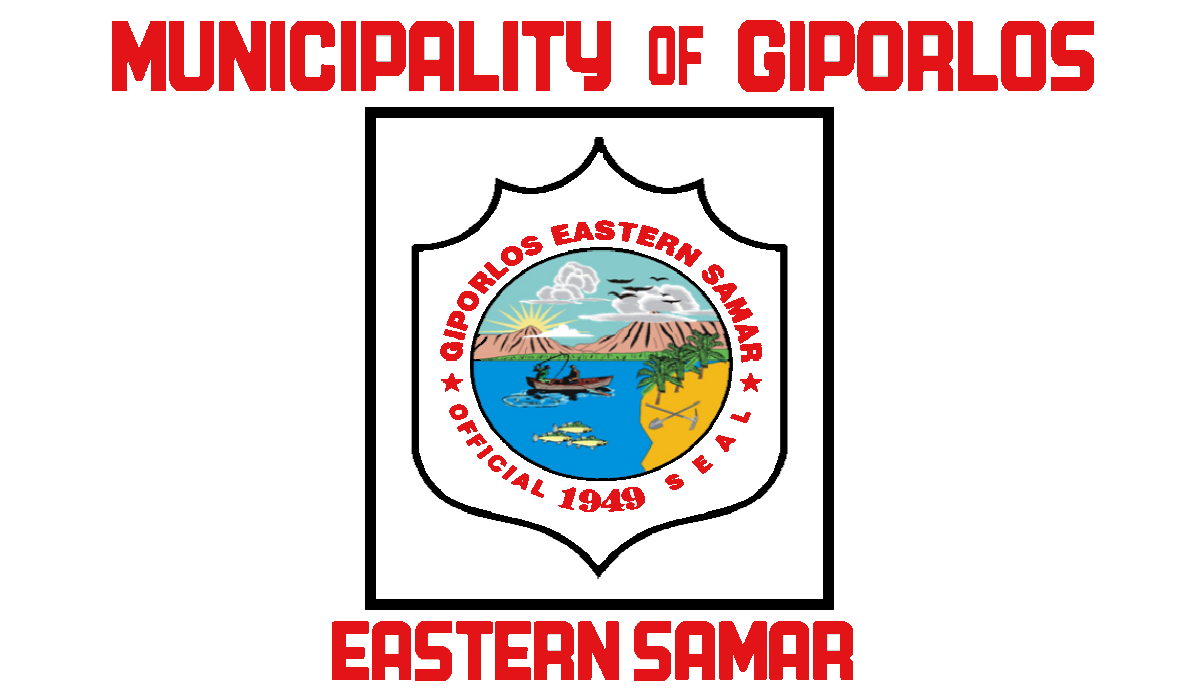
- Flag
- Etymology: Waray-waray podlos, 'to slip from capture'
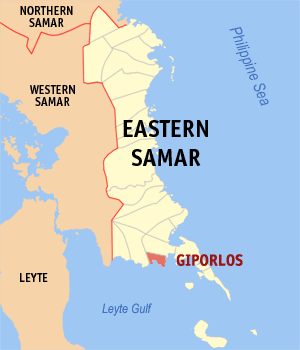
- Map of Eastern Samar with Giporlos highlighted
- Interactive map of Giporlos
- Location within the Philippines
- Coordinates: 11°07′15″N 125°26′58″E
- Country: Philippines
- Region: Eastern Visayas
- Province: Eastern Samar
- District: Lone district
- Barangays: 18 (see Barangays)

Government
  - Type: Sangguniang Bayan
  - Mayor: Gilbert I. Go
  - Vice Mayor: Licelle N. Biong
  - Representative: Maria Fe R. Abunda
  - Councilors: List: • Hyacinth B. Go; • Roberto P. Fabillar; • Rosalinda P. Llavado; • Elisa R. Mestiola; • Marvin C. Gonzales; • Inigo F. Balagasay; • Ernesto P. Elecho; • Lilia S. Longatang; DILG Masterlist of Officials
  - Electorate: 10,630 voters (2025)

Area
  - Total: 97.51 km^{2} (37.65 sq mi)
- Elevation: 57 m (187 ft)
- Highest elevation: 338 m (1,109 ft)
- Lowest elevation: 0 m (0 ft)

Population (2024 census)
  - Total: 12,974
  - Density: 133.1/km^{2} (344.6/sq mi)
  - Households: 3,167

Economy
  - Income class: 4th municipal income class
  - Poverty incidence: 37.16% (2023)
  - Revenue: ₱ 136.2 million (2022)
  - Assets: ₱ 374 million (2022)
  - Expenditure: ₱ 90.72 million (2022)
  - Liabilities: ₱ 41.86 million (2022)

Service provider
  - Electricity: Eastern Samar Electric Cooperative (ESAMELCO)
- Time zone: UTC+8 (PST)
- ZIP code: 6811
- PSGC: 0802608000
- IDD : area code: +63 (0)55
- Native languages: Waray; Tagalog
- Website: www.giporlos-esamar.gov.ph

Giporlos (IPA: [ˌhiˈporlɔs]), officially the Municipality of Giporlos (Waray: Bungto han Giporlos; Tagalog: Bayan ng Giporlos), is a municipality in the province of Eastern Samar, Philippines. According to the 2024 census, it has a population of 12,974 people.

Formerly, Giporlos was a barangay of the municipality of Balangiga, named San Bernardino.

== Etymology ==
The name of the municipality was taken from the Waray-waray word Hi Podlos ('the sly one'), the nickname given to a woman who was nearly kidnapped by marauding "Moros" (Muslims). A folk story in the town tells of two women who went to a coastal area called "Rawis" to gather seashells only to be confronted by Moro men. One of the women, who was quite observant to her surroundings, was able to escape with haste. The other woman, who was already being dragged by the Moros to their vinta, squirmed her way out of their clutches like an eel (Waray: podlos, 'to slip from capture'), leaving them clutching her skirt while she fled triumphantly, earning the name Hi Podlos. It is said that this name was changed to Hi Porlos to name the place or the whole area of settlement and was modified further by the Spaniards into its current spelling: Giporlos.

== Barangays ==
Giporlos is politically subdivided into 18 barangays. Each barangay consists of puroks and some have sitios.

- Barangay 1 (Poblacion)
- Barangay 2 (Poblacion)
- Barangay 3 (Poblacion)
- Barangay 4 (Poblacion)
- Barangay 5 (Poblacion)
- Barangay 6 (Poblacion)
- Barangay 7 (Poblacion)
- Barangay 8 (Poblacion)
- Biga
- Coticot
- Gigoso
- Huknan
- Parina
- Paya
- President Roxas
- San Miguel
- Santa Cruz (Cansingkol)
- San Isidro (Malabag)

== Demographics ==
Population census of Giporlos
Year	Pop.	±% p.a.
1960	10,043	—
1970	8,773	−1.34%
1975	10,015	+2.69%
1980	10,128	+0.22%
1990	11,001	+0.83%
1995	10,050	−1.68%
2000	10,218	+0.36%
2007	11,286	+1.38%
2010	12,040	+2.38%
2015	13,308	+1.93%
2020	13,117	−0.30%
2024	12,974	−0.26%
Source: Philippine Statistics Authority

The population of Giporlos in the 2024 census was 12,974 people, with a density of 130 inhabitants per square kilometre or 340 inhabitants per square mile.

== Climate ==
Climate data for Giporlos, Eastern Samar
Month	Jan	Feb	Mar	Apr	May	Jun	Jul	Aug	Sep	Oct	Nov	Dec	Year
Mean daily maximum °C (°F)	28 (82)	28 (82)	29 (84)	30 (86)	30 (86)	30 (86)	29 (84)	30 (86)	30 (86)	29 (84)	29 (84)	28 (82)	29 (84)
Mean daily minimum °C (°F)	22 (72)	22 (72)	22 (72)	23 (73)	24 (75)	24 (75)	24 (75)	24 (75)	24 (75)	24 (75)	23 (73)	23 (73)	23 (74)
Average precipitation mm (inches)	90 (3.5)	67 (2.6)	82 (3.2)	70 (2.8)	97 (3.8)	145 (5.7)	152 (6.0)	127 (5.0)	132 (5.2)	152 (6.0)	169 (6.7)	144 (5.7)	1,427 (56.2)
Average rainy days	17.0	13.5	16.0	16.5	20.6	24.3	26.0	25.4	25.2	26.4	23.0	21.1	255
Source: Meteoblue

== Economy ==
Poverty incidence of Giporlos (%)

Source: Philippine Statistics Authority
