= Hernani, Eastern Samar =

Municipality in Eastern Samar, Philippines

Hernani
- Municipality
- Municipality of Hernani
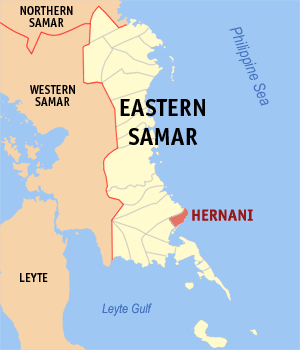
- Map of Eastern Samar with Hernani highlighted
- Interactive map of Hernani
- Location within the Philippines
- Coordinates: 11°19′26″N 125°37′05″E
- Country: Philippines
- Region: Eastern Visayas
- Province: Eastern Samar
- District: Lone district
- Founded: January 4, 1864
- Barangays: 13 (see Barangays)

Government
  - Type: Sangguniang Bayan
  - Mayor: Amado L. Candido
  - Vice Mayor: Socorro D. Ponferrada
  - Representative: Christopher Sheen P. Gonzales
  - Councilors: List: • Imelyn B. Montero; • Cesar G. Tagon; • Leo B. Candido; • Renato C. Orocay; • Julie C. Habagat; • Roderick B. Dequilla; • Jose P. Antipolo; • Marcial B. Baje; DILG Masterlist of Officials
  - Electorate: 7,047 voters (2025)

Area
  - Total: 49.42 km^{2} (19.08 sq mi)
- Elevation: 31 m (102 ft)
- Highest elevation: 276 m (906 ft)
- Lowest elevation: 0 m (0 ft)

Population (2024 census)
  - Total: 8,296
  - Households: 2,264

Economy
  - Income class: 5th municipal income class
  - Poverty incidence: 30.2% (2023)
  - Revenue: ₱ 84.44 million (2024)
  - Assets: ₱ 247.8 million (2024)
  - Expenditure: ₱ 81.12 million (2024)
  - Liabilities: ₱ 26.46 million (2024)

Service provider
  - Electricity: Eastern Samar Electric Cooperative (ESAMELCO)
- Time zone: UTC+8 (PST)
- ZIP code: 6804
- PSGC: 0802610000
- IDD : area code: +63 (0)55
- Native languages: Waray; Tagalog
- Website: hernani-esamar.gov.ph

Hernani, officially the Municipality of Hernani (Waray: Bungto han Hernani; Tagalog: Bayan ng Hernani), is a municipality in the province of Eastern Samar, Philippines. According to the 2024 census, it has a population of 8,296 people.

It was formerly called Nag-as, after the name of the river flowing southeast of the town center.

== History ==
Hernani was founded around the year 1850 by a settler from Guiuan named Miguel Candido. Hernani, was created into a municipality by virtue of a Royal Order on January 4, 1864.

On October 12, 1897, giant tidal waves struck Hernani. More than 300 people were killed, and public buildings and houses were destroyed, including the newly–built stone church. Following the disaster, the survivors relocated the town center to a more secure place about one–half kilometer inland. This site is now the present location.

Immediately following the Philippine-American War, the political status of Hernani was reduced into a barrio under the jurisdiction of Lanang (now Llorente). In 1912, its status as a municipality was restored but the seat of local government was transferred to Pambujan (now General MacArthur). However, in 1926, the municipality of Hernani regained back the township by virtue of an Executive Order issued by then American Government–General Leonard Wood.

== Barangays ==
Hernani is politically subdivided into 13 barangays. Each barangay consists of puroks and some have sitios.

Four barangays, located in the poblacion, are known primarily by number.

- Barangay 1
- Barangay 2
- Barangay 3
- Barangay 4
- Batang
- Nagaja
- Padang
- Carmen
- Garawon
- San Isidro
- Canciledes
- San Miguel
- Cacatmonan

== Demographics ==
Population census of Hernani
Year	Pop.	±% p.a.
1903	4,150	—
1918	5,253	+1.58%
1939	9,405	+2.81%
1948	5,035	−6.71%
1960	6,622	+2.31%
1970	6,216	−0.63%
1975	7,315	+3.32%
1980	7,032	−0.79%
1990	6,840	−0.28%
1995	8,055	+3.11%
2000	7,642	−1.12%
2007	7,974	+0.59%
2010	8,070	+0.44%
2015	8,573	+1.16%
2020	8,531	−0.10%
2024	8,296	−0.67%
Source: Philippine Statistics Authority

The population of Hernani in the 2024 census was 8,296 people, with a density of 170 inhabitants per square kilometre or 440 inhabitants per square mile.

== Climate ==
Climate data for Hernani, Eastern Samar
Month	Jan	Feb	Mar	Apr	May	Jun	Jul	Aug	Sep	Oct	Nov	Dec	Year
Mean daily maximum °C (°F)	28 (82)	28 (82)	29 (84)	30 (86)	30 (86)	30 (86)	29 (84)	30 (86)	30 (86)	29 (84)	29 (84)	28 (82)	29 (84)
Mean daily minimum °C (°F)	22 (72)	22 (72)	22 (72)	23 (73)	24 (75)	24 (75)	24 (75)	24 (75)	24 (75)	24 (75)	23 (73)	23 (73)	23 (74)
Average precipitation mm (inches)	90 (3.5)	67 (2.6)	82 (3.2)	70 (2.8)	97 (3.8)	145 (5.7)	152 (6.0)	127 (5.0)	132 (5.2)	152 (6.0)	169 (6.7)	144 (5.7)	1,427 (56.2)
Average rainy days	17.0	13.5	16.0	16.5	20.6	24.3	26.0	25.4	25.2	26.4	23.0	21.1	255
Source: Meteoblue

== Economy ==
Poverty incidence of Hernani (%)

Source: Philippine Statistics Authority
