= Samar's 3rd congressional district =

Philippines constituency, 1907 to 1965

Samar's 3rd congressional district was one of the three congressional districts of the Philippines in the province of Samar in existence between 1907 and 1965. It was created under the Philippine Organic Act from former territories of the province. The district was originally composed of the municipalities of Balangiga, Borongan, Dolores, Guiuan, Llorente, Oras, San Julian, Sulat and Taft which now constitute the province of Eastern Samar. It was a single-member district throughout the ten legislatures of the Insular Government of the Philippine Islands from 1907 to 1935, the three legislatures of the Commonwealth of the Philippines from 1935 to 1946, and the first five congresses of the Third Philippine Republic from 1946 to 1965.

The district was represented by a total of eleven representatives throughout its existence. It was abolished in 1965 following the passage of Republic Act No. 4221 which created the province of Eastern Samar. It was last represented by Felipe J. Abrigo of the Nacionalista Party (NP).

== Representation history ==
#	Image	Member	Term of office		Legislature	Party	Electoral history	Constituent LGUs
#	Image	Member	Start	End	Legislature	Party	Electoral history	Constituent LGUs
=== Samar's 3rd district for the Philippine Assembly ===
District created January 9, 1907.
1		Eugenio D. Daza	October 16, 1907	October 16, 1909	1st	Independent	Elected in 1907.	1907–1909; Balangiga, Borongan, Dolores, Guiuan, Llorente, Oras, San Julian, Sulat, Taft
2		Eladio Cinco	October 16, 1909	October 16, 1912	2nd	Nacionalista	Elected in 1909.	1909–1912; Balangiga, Borongan, Dolores, Guiuan, Llorente, Oras, Salcedo, San Julian, Sulat, Taft
3		Mariano Alde	October 16, 1912	October 16, 1916	3rd	Nacionalista	Elected in 1912.	1912–1916; Balangiga, Borongan, Dolores, Guiuan, Hernani, Llorente, Oras, Salcedo, San Julian, Sulat, Taft
=== Samar's 3rd district for the House of Representatives of the Philippine Islands ===
4		José Lugay Raquel	October 16, 1916	June 6, 1922	4th	Nacionalista	Elected in 1916.	1916–1935; Balangiga, Borongan, Dolores, Guiuan, Hernani, Llorente, Oras, Salcedo, San Julian, Sulat, Taft
4		José Lugay Raquel	October 16, 1916	June 6, 1922	5th	Nacionalista	Re-elected in 1919.	1916–1935; Balangiga, Borongan, Dolores, Guiuan, Hernani, Llorente, Oras, Salcedo, San Julian, Sulat, Taft
5		Íñigo Abenis	June 6, 1922	June 2, 1925	6th	Nacionalista; Colectivista	Elected in 1922.	1916–1935; Balangiga, Borongan, Dolores, Guiuan, Hernani, Llorente, Oras, Salcedo, San Julian, Sulat, Taft
6		Gerardo Morrero	June 2, 1925	June 5, 1928	7th	Nacionalista; Consolidado	Elected in 1925.	1916–1935; Balangiga, Borongan, Dolores, Guiuan, Hernani, Llorente, Oras, Salcedo, San Julian, Sulat, Taft
7		Gregorio B. Abogado	June 5, 1928	June 2, 1931	8th	Nacionalista; Consolidado	Elected in 1928.	1916–1935; Balangiga, Borongan, Dolores, Guiuan, Hernani, Llorente, Oras, Salcedo, San Julian, Sulat, Taft
(6)		Gerardo Morrero	June 2, 1931	September 16, 1935	9th	Nacionalista; Consolidado	Elected in 1931.	1916–1935; Balangiga, Borongan, Dolores, Guiuan, Hernani, Llorente, Oras, Salcedo, San Julian, Sulat, Taft
(6)		Gerardo Morrero	June 2, 1931	September 16, 1935	10th	Nacionalista; Democrático	Re-elected in 1934.	1916–1935; Balangiga, Borongan, Dolores, Guiuan, Hernani, Llorente, Oras, Salcedo, San Julian, Sulat, Taft
#	Image	Member	Term of office		National Assembly	Party	Electoral history	Constituent LGUs
#	Image	Member	Start	End	National Assembly	Party	Electoral history	Constituent LGUs
=== Samar's 3rd district for the National Assembly (Commonwealth of the Philippines) ===
8		Juan L. Bocar	November 15, 1935	December 30, 1941	1st	Nacionalista; Democrático	Elected in 1935.	1935–1941; Balangiga, Borongan, Dolores, Guiuan, Hernani, Llorente, Oras, Salcedo, San Julian, Sulat, Taft
8		Juan L. Bocar	November 15, 1935	December 30, 1941	2nd	Nacionalista	Re-elected in 1938.	1935–1941; Balangiga, Borongan, Dolores, Guiuan, Hernani, Llorente, Oras, Salcedo, San Julian, Sulat, Taft
District dissolved into the two-seat Samar's at-large district for the National Assembly (Second Philippine Republic).
#	Image	Member	Term of office		Common wealth Congress	Party	Electoral history	Constituent LGUs
#	Image	Member	Start	End	Common wealth Congress	Party	Electoral history	Constituent LGUs
=== Samar's 3rd district for the House of Representatives of the Commonwealth of the Philippines ===
District re-created May 24, 1945.
9		Félix Opimo	June 9, 1945	May 25, 1946	1st	Nacionalista	Elected in 1941.	1945–1946; Balangiga, Borongan, Dolores, Guiuan, Hernani, Llorente, Oras, Salcedo, San Julian, Sulat, Taft
#	Image	Member	Term of office		Congress	Party	Electoral history	Constituent LGUs
#	Image	Member	Start	End	Congress	Party	Electoral history	Constituent LGUs
=== Samar's 3rd district for the House of Representatives of the Philippines ===
10		Adriano D. Lomuntad	May 25, 1946	December 30, 1949	1st	Liberal	Elected in 1946.	1946–1949; Balangiga, Borongan, Dolores, Guiuan, Hernani, Llorente, Oras, Salcedo, San Julian, Sulat, Taft
(7)		Gregorio B. Abogado	December 30, 1949	December 30, 1957	2nd	Liberal	Elected in 1949.	1949–1953; Balangiga, Borongan, Can-avid, Dolores, General MacArthur, Giporlos, Guiuan, Hernani, Llorente, Mercedes, Oras, Quinapondan, Salcedo, San Julian, San Policarpo, Sulat, Taft
(7)		Gregorio B. Abogado	December 30, 1949	December 30, 1957	3rd	Liberal	Re-elected in 1953.	1953–1961; Arteche, Balangiga, Borongan, Can-avid, Dolores, General MacArthur, Giporlos, Guiuan, Hernani, Llorente, Maydolong, Mercedes, Oras, Quinapondan, Salcedo, San Julian, San Policarpo, Sulat, Taft
11		Felipe J. Abrigo	December 30, 1957	December 30, 1965	4th	Nacionalista	Elected in 1957.	1953–1961; Arteche, Balangiga, Borongan, Can-avid, Dolores, General MacArthur, Giporlos, Guiuan, Hernani, Llorente, Maydolong, Mercedes, Oras, Quinapondan, Salcedo, San Julian, San Policarpo, Sulat, Taft
11		Felipe J. Abrigo	December 30, 1957	December 30, 1965	5th	Nacionalista	Re-elected in 1961. Redistricted to Eastern Samar's at-large district.	1961–1965; Arteche, Balangiga, Balangkayan, Borongan, Can-avid, Dolores, General MacArthur, Giporlos, Guiuan, Hernani, Lawaan, Llorente, Maydolong, Mercedes, Oras, Quinapondan, Salcedo, San Julian, San Policarpo, Sulat, Taft
District dissolved into Eastern Samar's at-large district.

== See also ==
- Legislative districts of Samar
