= Samar (historical province) =

Former province of the Philippines

- Province of the Philippines
- 1768-1965
- Coat of arms

- Location of the historical province of Samar.
- Capital: Catbalogan; Capul (1848–1852)
- History
  - Established: 1768
  - Final split from Leyte: 1777
  - Final split from Leyte approved in Madrid: 1786
  - Final split from Leyte became effective: 1799
  - Declared province by Royal Decree: 11 August 1841
  - Disestablished: 19 June 1965
Preceded by
Leyte
Succeeded by
Western Samar
Northern Samar
Eastern Samar
- Today part of: · Eastern Samar · Northern Samar · Samar

Samar was a province in the Philippines which is coterminous with the island of Samar and its outlying islands. Samar is significant in the Philippine history because some historians believe that the oldest ancient kingdom of the country is in Samar. It existed from the Spanish colonization era until its division into three provinces—Eastern Samar, Northern Samar, and Western Samar (now simply called as Samar)—in 1965.

== History ==
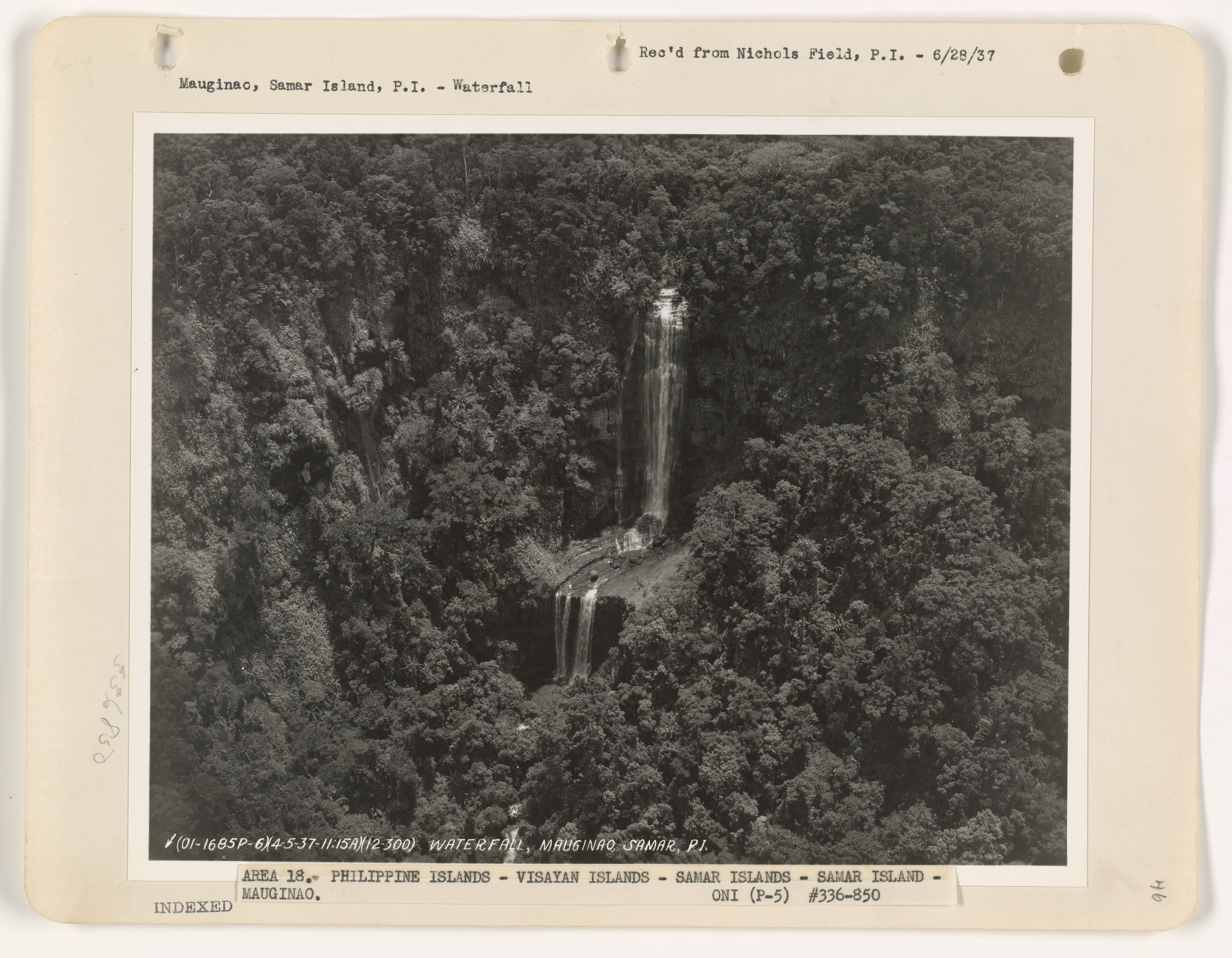
Waterfall in Matuguinao, then a municipal district part of Gandara, 1937

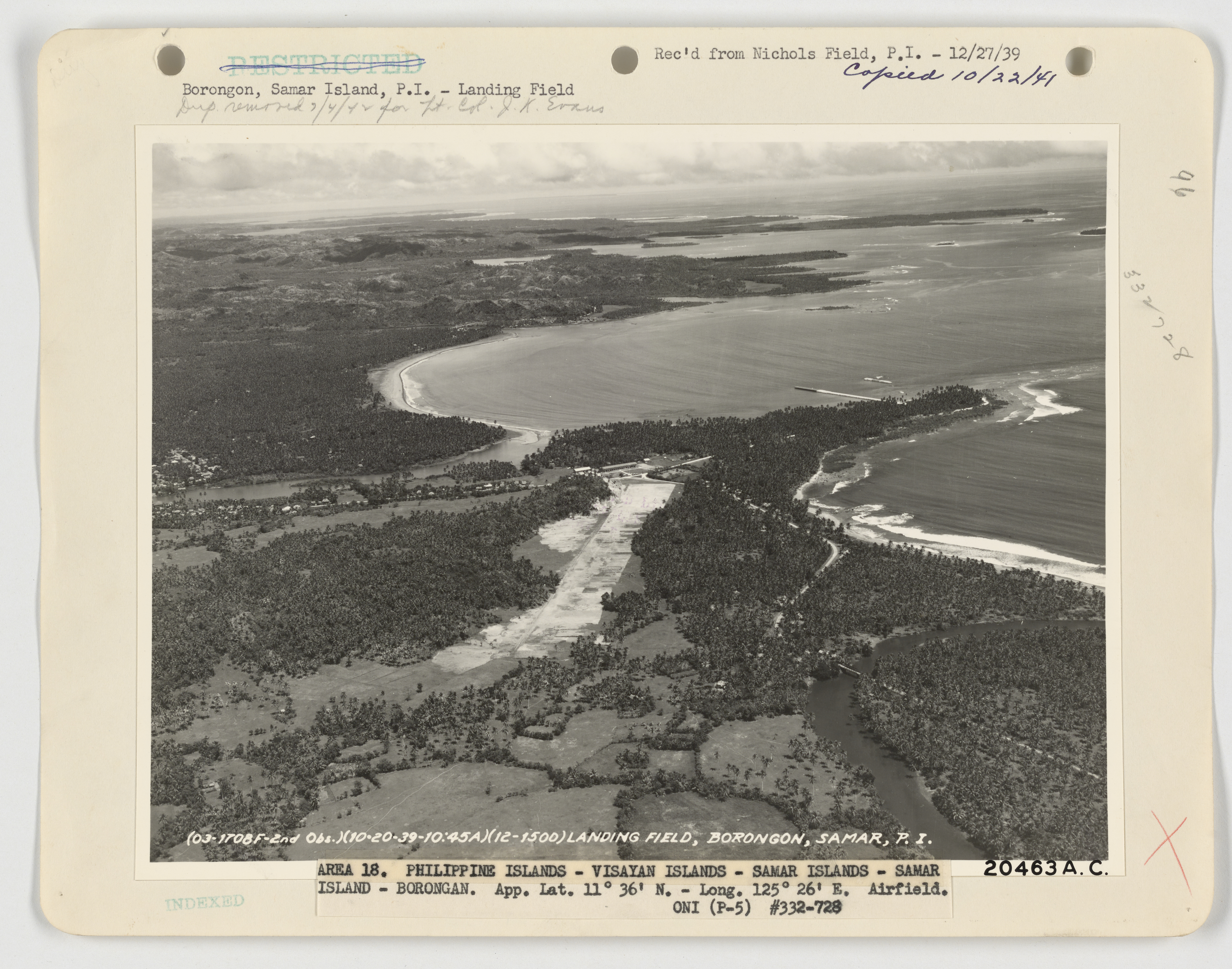
Landing field in Borongan, 1939

Samar was established as a distinct province in 1768 after it got separated from the province of Leyte, which it had been part of since separating from Cebu in 1735. An earlier division between Samar and Leyte happened in 1747 but was reversed in 1762 with the approval of the King of Spain, following complaints from the Jesuits. In 1777, Samar and Leyte split for the last time when it was approved in Madrid in 1786 and had been effective in 1799.

In 1803, the towns of Guiuan, Balangiga and Basey were turned over to the Franciscans for the lack of Augustinian priests. On August 11, 1841, Queen Isabella II of Spain signed a Royal Decree declaring Samar as a province. The 1835 Census showed Samar had 18,671 native families and also had 174 Spanish-Filipino families.

In 1898, the Americans landed on the beach of Catarman and organized a revolutionary army led by General Vicente Lukban who fought the invaders armed with cannons and rifles with only bolos and paltiks. Although defeated, they, however, continued to harass the Americans through guerrilla warfare. In April 1900, the Battle of Catubig saw Filipino guerrillas ambush the U.S. 43rd Infantry Regiment, forcing their retreat after four days. On September 28, 1901, the Balangiga massacre during the Philippine–American War led to the deaths of 48 American soldiers, prompting General Jacob H. Smith to order them to turn Samar into a "howling wilderness." After which, the Pacification of Samar occurred, overseeing an estimate of 2,000 to 5,000 deaths due to famine and disease until 1902. In 1910, Pope Pius X established the Diocese of Calbayog, separating Samar and Leyte from Cebu.

In 1942, Imperial Japanese forces occupied Samar. On October 24, 1944, the Battle off Samar occurred and resulted in significant losses for both sides, but ultimately did not alter the course of the Philippines campaign.

On June 19, 1965, the Philippine Congress along with the three Samar Representatives, Eladio T. Balite (1st District), Fernando R. Veloso (2nd District) and Felipe J. Abrigo (3rd District), approved Republic Act No. 4221 dividing the province of Samar into three divisions: Northern Samar, Eastern Samar, and Western Samar. Each province adopted a new capital: Catbalogan (Western Samar), Borongan (Eastern Samar), and Catarman (Northern Samar). The division was later ratified through a plebiscite held on November 9, 1965. On June 21, 1969, under Republic Act No. 5650, Western Samar was renamed simply into Samar, with Catbalogan still as the capital.

== Geography ==
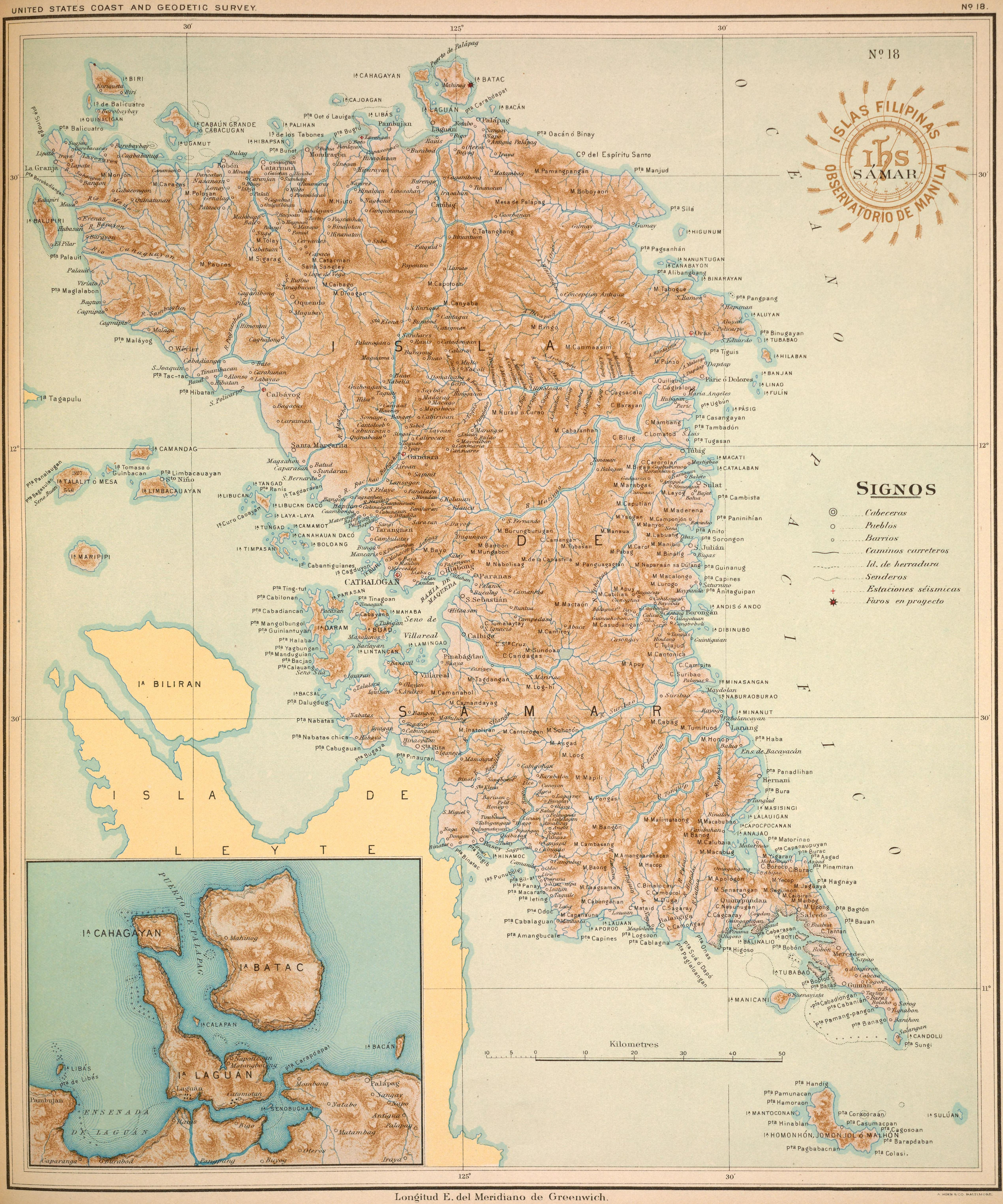
1899 map of Samar

Samar was coterminous with its namesake island and its outlying islands. By the time of its division in 1965, Samar comprised 58 municipalities and 1 city:

- Allen
- Arteche
- Almagro
- Balangkayan
- Balangiga
- Basey
- Borongan
- Bobon
- Calbayog
- Calbiga
- Can-avid
- Capul
- Catarman
- Catbalogan (capital)
- Catubig
- Daram
- Dolores
- Gamay
- Gandara
- General MacArthur
- Giporlos
- Guiuan
- Hernani
- Hinabangan
- Jiabong
- Laoang
- Lapinig
- Las Navas
- Lavezares
- Lawaan
- Llorente
- Marabut
- Maydolong
- Mercedes
- Mondragon
- Motiong
- Oras
- Palapag
- Pambujan
- Pinabacdao
- Quinapundan
- Salcedo
- San Antonio
- San Isidro
- San Jose
- San Jose de Buan
- San Julian
- San Policarpo
- San Roque
- San Sebastian
- Santa Rita
- Santo Niño
- Sulat
- Taft
- Talalora
- Tarangnan
- Villareal
- Wright
- Zumarraga

Catbalogan served as the provincial capital; Capul also served as such from 1848 to 1852.

== Government ==
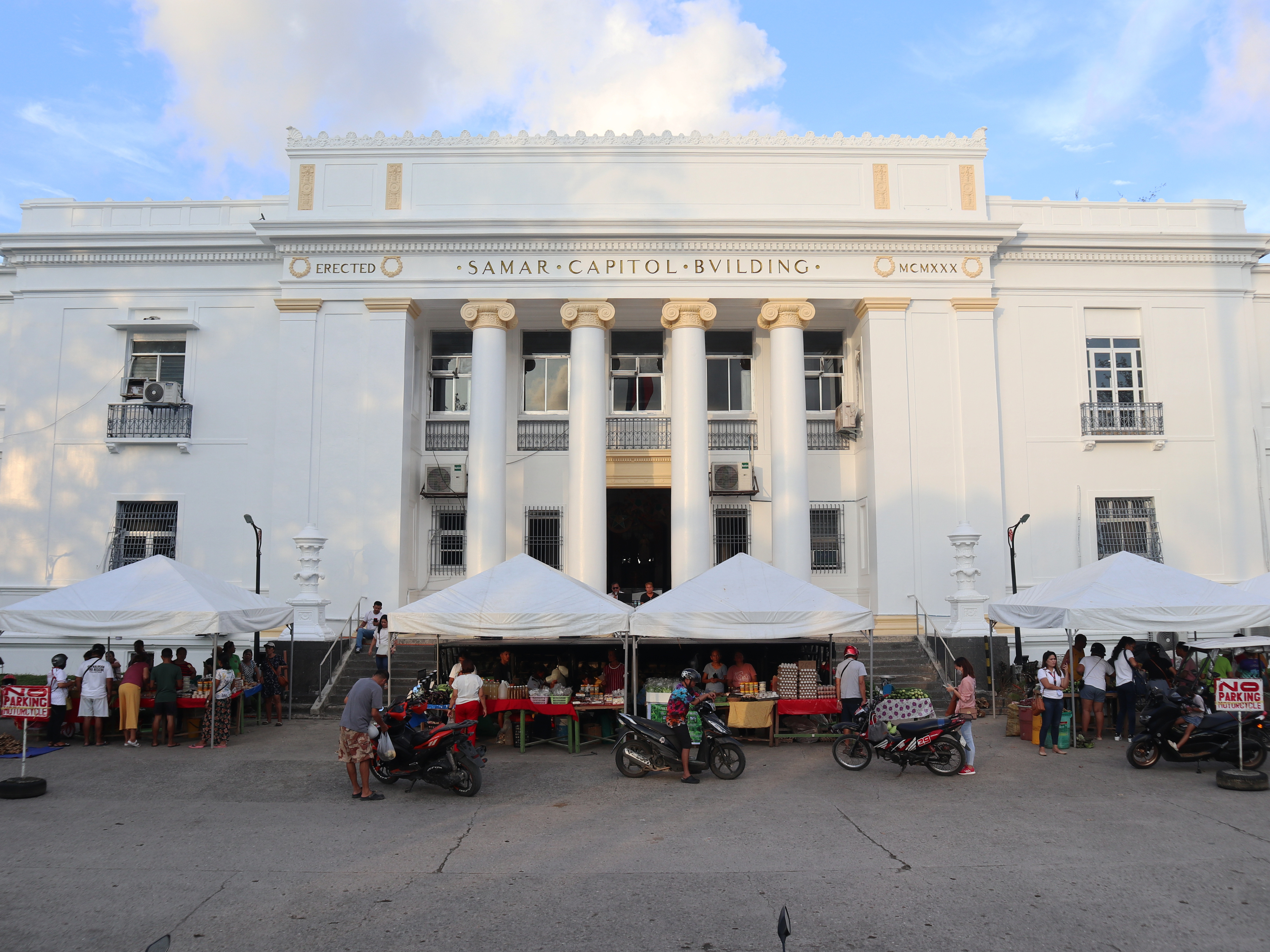
Samar Provincial Capitol in Catbalogan, built in 1930, served as the province's final seat of government and later became the seat for Western Samar (modern-day Samar), a status it retains to the present.

Samar's provincial government was last headed by the governor. The province was also last represented at the Congress through its three congressional districts, which existed from 1907 to 1965, except during the World War II when it was represented as an at-large congressional district in the National Assembly of the Second Philippine Republic from 1943 to 1944. Previously, it was part of the 9th senatorial district from 1916 to 1935 and was also represented at-large during the Malolos Congress of the First Philippine Republic from 1898 to 1899.

== See also ==
- Samar
- Samar (province)
- Northern Samar
- Eastern Samar
