= José Lugay Raquel =

Filipino doctor and politician

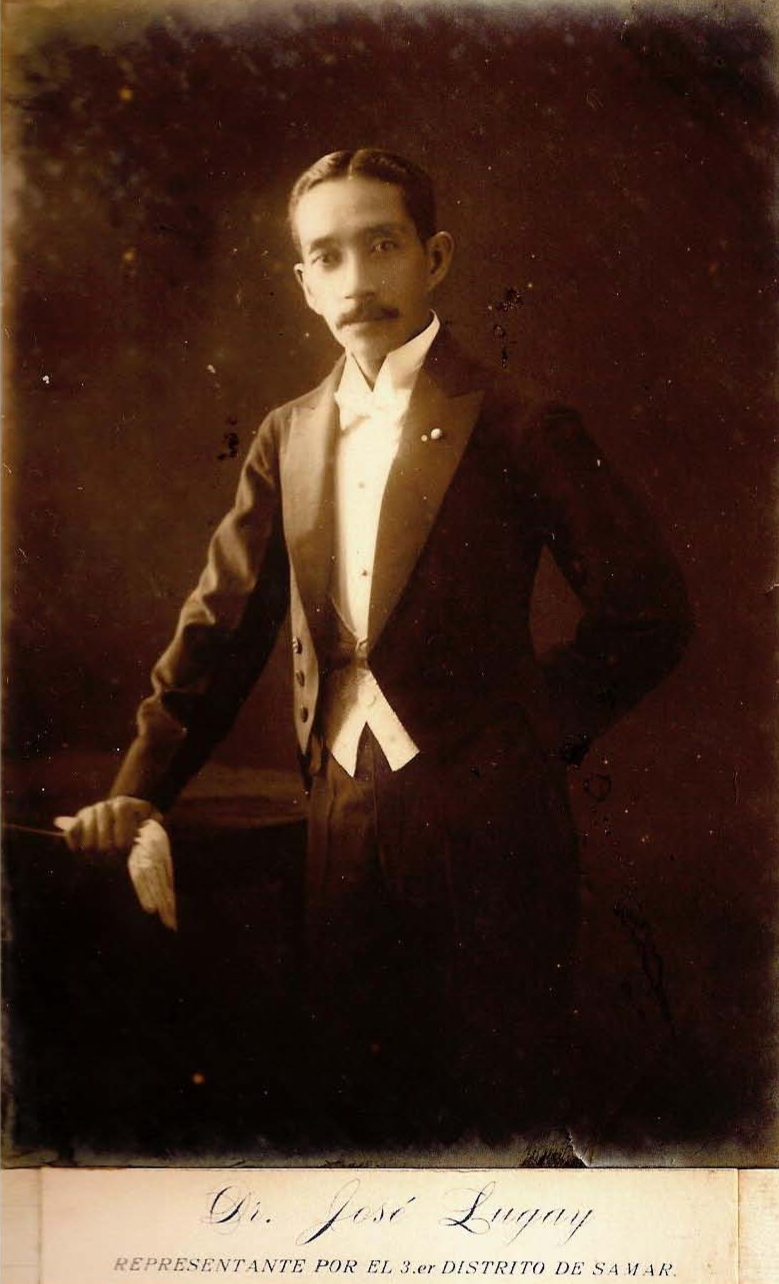
- Raquel as member of the Philippine House of Representatives, c. 1917

Member of the Philippine House of Representatives from Samar's 3rd district
- In office 1916–1922
- Preceded by: Mariano Alde
- Succeeded by: Íñigo Abenis

Personal details
- Born: 23 October 1874 San Roque, Cavite, Captaincy General of the Philippines
- Died: Unknown
- Party: Nacionalista
- Education: Colegio de San Juan de Letran; University of Santo Tomas

José Lugay Raquel (October 23, 1874 — unknown) was a Filipino medical doctor and politician who represented Samar's third district from 1916 to 1922.

== Biography ==
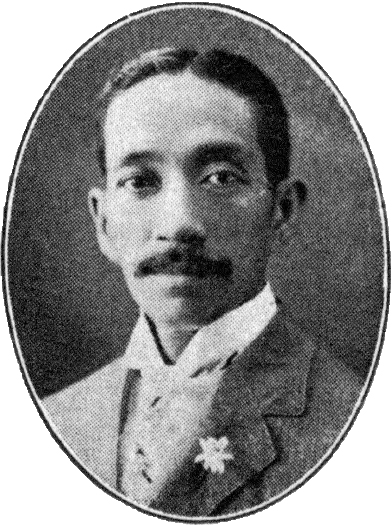
Portrait published by the Bureau of Printing, c. 1917

He was born in San Roque, Cavite, on October 23, 1874. He finished his primary education at Don Julián Arceda Cruz's school and secondary education at Don José Basa Enríquez's school then to Colegio de San Juan de Letran in Manila from 1886 to 1891, where he earned a bachelor of arts degree. He studied medicine and surgery at the Faculty of Medicine from 1891 to 1898 and at the University of Santo Tomás from 1901 to 1902, earning his medical and surgical degrees. He joined the revolutionary forces while still a student, working as a medical assistant during the revolution in Cavite.

He then took on various medical roles in military hospitals and health departments, especially in Manila and Nueva Vizcaya. He served in health-related positions, including provincial president of Nueva Vizcaya in 1904 and health president of the Guiuan and Salcedo district. He was a member of the Fourth Philippine Legislature representing Samar's 3rd district and was reelected for the Fifth Legislature in 1919. He served until 1922.
