= Borongan Airport =

Borongan Airport Luparan han Borongan Tugpahanan sa Borongan Paliparan ng Borongan
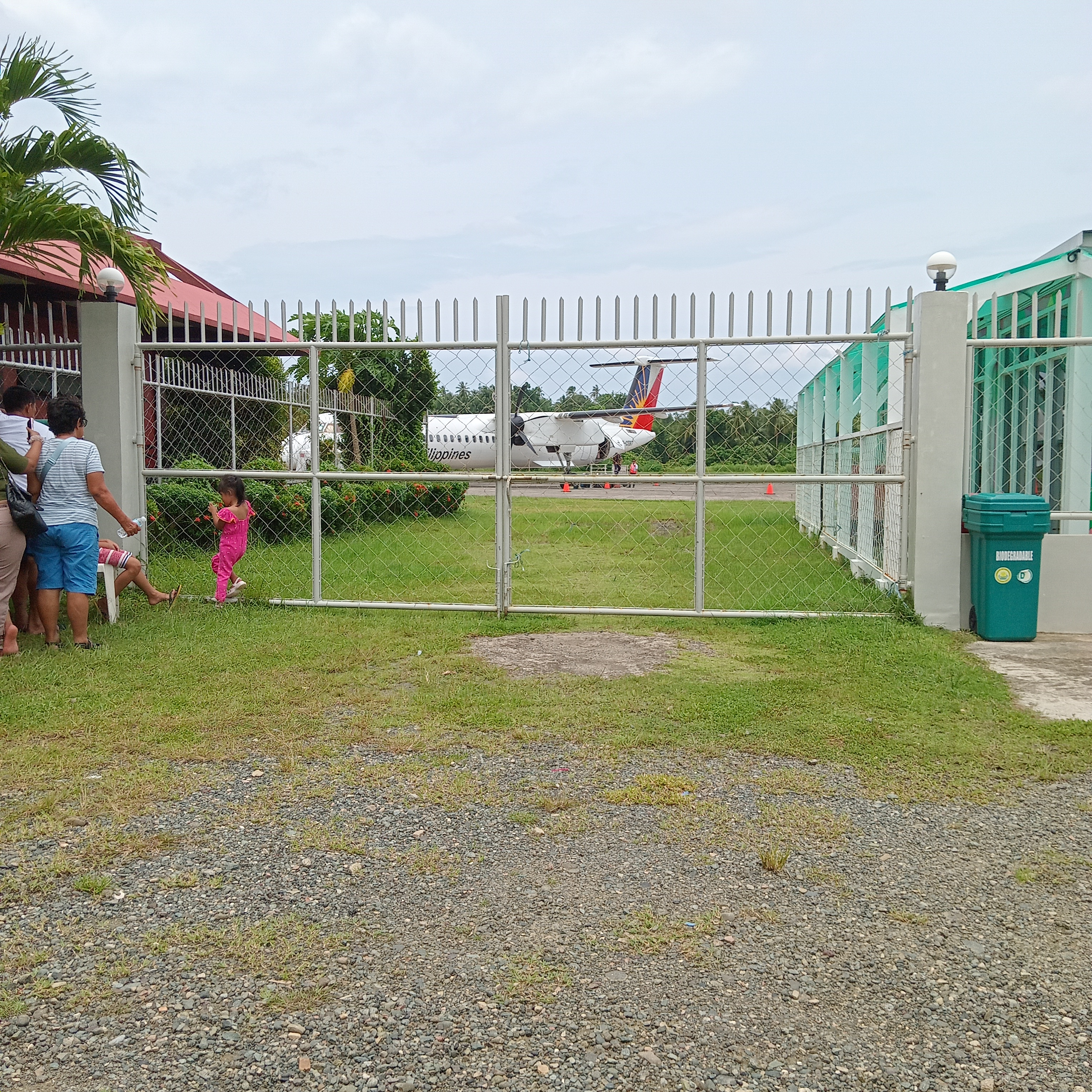
- IATA: BPA; ICAO: RPVW

Summary
- Airport type: Public
- Owner/Operator: Civil Aviation Authority of the Philippines
- Serves: Borongan
- Location: Barangay Punta Maria, Borongan, Eastern Samar
- Elevation AMSL: 2 m / 7 ft
- Coordinates: 11°40′27″N 125°28′4″E

Map
- Location in the Philippines

Runways
Direction	Length		Surface
Direction	m	ft	Surface
02/20	1,600	5,249	Asphalt
- Source: DAFIF

Borongan Airport (Waray: Luparan han Borongan, Cebuano: Tugpahanan sa Borongan, Filipino: Paliparan ng Borongan) (IATA: BPA, ICAO: RPVW) is an airport serving the general area of Borongan, the capital of the province of Eastern Samar, located in the province of Eastern Samar in the Philippines. It is classified as a community airport by the Civil Aviation Authority of the Philippines (CAAP), an attached agency of the Department of Transportation. The airport was conceptualized in the 1960s and 1970s and the runway was finished in the 1980s. Numerous airlines have expressed their intention to operate at the airport: Asian Spirit in 2007 and Air Juan in 2018. Three airlines have operated in the airport: South East Asian Airlines (SEAIR) in 2008, Leading Edge Air Services Corporation (LEASCOR) in 2018, and Philippine Airlines since 2022. The airport was described by local politicians as a benefit to Eastern Samar's agricultural and entrepreneurial economy.

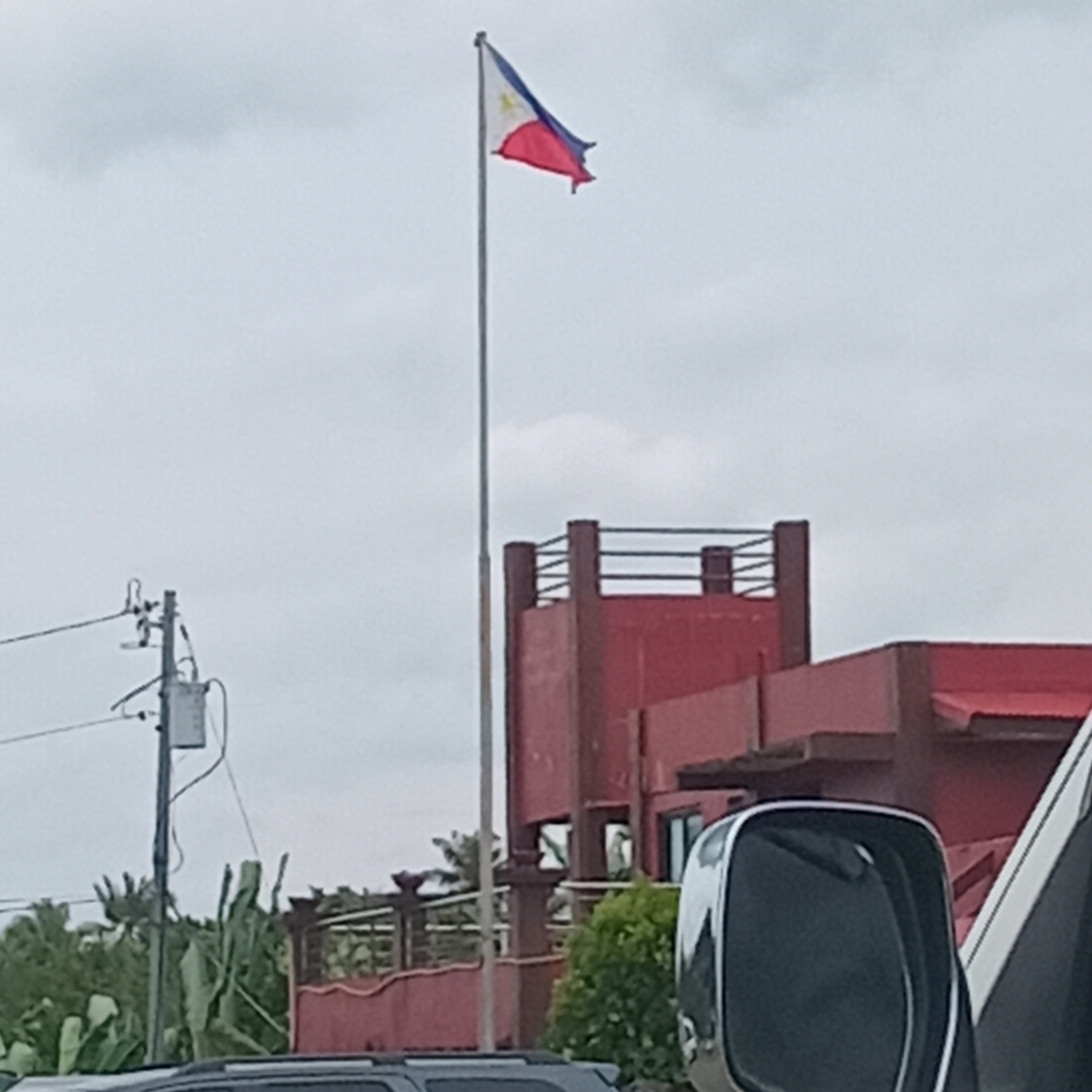
A view of the airport

== History ==
=== Conception and first flight (1960-2014) ===
Before the creation of Borongan Airport, the province was originally isolated, with citizens required to go to Calbayog and Catarman to fly to Manila. In the 1960s and 1970s, the airport was conceptualized, and construction started, leading to the completion of the runway in the 1980s. In 2007, the rehabilitation of the airport was brought up, but Provincial Engineer Dindo Picardal said that 60 million pesos was needed for rehabilitation to make the airport operational. By that time, Asian Spirit had signified its intention to operate at the airport. President Gloria Macapagal Arroyo prioritized the creation of the airport, according to Governor Ben Evardone, releasing 20 million pesos initially and allocating 20 million pesos more for the project's development while Eastern Samar Congressman Teodulo Coquilla said the rehabilitation of the airport, among other projects, remained his primary concern. Evardone invited South East Asian Airlines (SEAIR) President Avelino Zapanta for SEAIR to operate in the airport, who described the invitation's acceptance as a "gamble" on their part, nevertheless accepting after seeing the potential of Eastern Samar as a tourist destination. Due to an inspection by the Air Traffic Office, a test flight was launched on August 25, 2008, before any passengers launched from the airport. On September 2, Borongan Airport was opened by Evardone, stating, "We have arrived. We made history today, and we will continue to make history. A lot of opportunities are waiting out there for Eastern Samar." The first flight, operated by SEAIR, launched from the Ninoy Aquino International Airport at 10:50 a.m. utilizing their Dornier 328, a 32-seater aircraft. After 20 minutes, the aircraft landed that same day. The flight schedule consisted of two weekly flights on Monday and Friday from Borongan to Manila and vice versa. Operations stopped that same year.

=== Airline negotiations and PAL maiden flight (2014-2022) ===
On December 8, 2014, a Philippine Air Force airplane transported relief goods for victims of Typhoon Hagupit in Samar through Borongan Airport, but the airplane got stuck due to a tire bursting. The airplane returned to Cebu shortly after. In 2017, the Leading Edge Air Services Corporation (LEASCOR) expressed its intention to operate in Borongan Airport, leading to Aviation Cadet Development Inc. (ACDI) announcing in March 2018 Cebu to Borongan routes utilizing Fokker 50 aircraft that would start in April. Shortly after, the CAAP told the airline Air Juan to fly to smaller destinations in Eastern Visayas due to its small fleet, suggesting routes such as Borongan-Cebu and vice versa. In October 2018, officials of ACDI and the CAAP conducted the final check of LEASCOR aircraft to be used in the upcoming Clark to Borongan route. LEASCOR operations started in November. In May 2019, LEASCOR considered establishing a Borongan-Ormoc-Cebu route.

A study by the Cebu Pacific Flight Operations Safety and Security Team that studied the viability of a route to the airport took place from September 14 to 16, 2022. Cebu Pacific Captain Carlo Aclan then told city officials that there were no obstacles in operating the airport once again, leading the CAAP to report that city officials were ready to accept deals with airlines. City Mayor Dayan Agda reported on October 11 that the city government would sign an agreement on October 25 with Philippine Airlines (PAL) for a route from Manila to Borongan, adding that the planned maiden flight was on November 25. In December 2022, the scheduled PAL maiden flight from Cebu to Borongan was reported to be on December 19 instead. On December 5, the route also extended to Manila via Cebu. Ahead of the flight, a city ordinance was passed detailing the rules for citizens near and on the airport. The PAL maiden flight commenced that same day, servicing 73 passengers aboard a De Havilland Dash 8 aircraft that launched at 11:05 a.m. and landed 50 minutes later. The flight was welcomed by Evardone, Agda, PAL Vice President for Sales Salvador Britanico, PAL AVP for Network and Fleet Planning Bryan Ang, and CAAP Area 8 Manager Danilo Abareta. After the flight, the PAL schedule consisted of a Cebu-Borongan flight on Mondays and a Borongan-Cebu flight on Fridays.

=== Further improvements (2022-present) ===
On December 21, 2022, House Minority Floor Leader Marcelino Libanan had a meeting with DOTr Secretary Jaime Bautista to fund several improvements of the airport. Libanan and Bautista planned to implement a runway extension from the original 1.2 kilometres (0.75 miles) runway to 2 km (1.2 mi) to accommodate larger airplanes. Another planned improvement was to enlarge the terminal building from the original departure area, which could seat 60 people. Other improvements included the creation of a hangar and the enabling of nighttime flights. To encourage tourism to the city following the COVID-19 pandemic, the city government offered fare discounts and a free shuttle ride to the airport in the first months of 2023. The construction of the new airport terminal started in March, utilizing container vans. After three months of construction, the airport terminal was done. A memorandum of agreement was signed by CAAP with the city government on June 13 to cover the development and maintenance of the local airport. On June 19, the city government of Borongan opened a new terminal to passengers and travelers, with Agda describing it as a "symbol of hope" with a cost of 11.68 million pesos. The new terminal had an improved capacity of 120 passengers and a cold storage facility that could preserve the shelf life of perishable foods; the building was a steel-made modular facility that could easily be moved, with a cheap construction cost, and could withstand typhoons. In late 2023, the city government planned to renew the contract with PAL and requested them to change the flight frequency to thrice a week. On January 2, Libanan reported that he secured 200 million pesos, funding from the Philippine government to improve the airport. Manila-Cebu-Borongan flights were planned to be added in July 2024, according to a report in January. In July, 25 companies bid funding for four airports, including Borongan Airport, with Borongan receiving 193.9 million pesos. In September 2024, PAL confirmed the launching of a third weekly flight every Wednesday starting September 18. Bislig City Officials visited the airport on October 18 to gain ideas and replicate the airport's flight model to improve Bislig Airport. In September 2025, Typhoon Bualoi led to the cancellation of a Borongan-Cebu flight. Due to the winds of Typhoon Kalmaegi, the airport suffered minor damage in the terminal roof, the CAAP reported on November 5.

== Reception and effects ==
Libanan described the airport as a "bridge in the sky" that needed to be fortified and strengthened. The opening of the airport was described as a benefit to the province's tourism industry, with Evardone saying that the airport would bring wider opportunities to the province. Agda stated that the airport could foster more economic activity and help grow Borongan's agriculture and tourism sectors. He said that the transportation system benefited entrepreneurs transporting farm and sea products to Manila, also helping the beneficiars of the local program "Dukwag Agricultura" to negotiate their products outside of Borongan. OpinYon News said that the airport not only provided links between Eastern Samar and Cebu City but also "opened up new economic opportunities for what was once one of Eastern Visayas’ poorest provinces." Eastern Samar Governor Dindo Picardal said that the airport was an "economic driver" for the province, stating, "We see this as a tool for local development, allowing us to be linked and connected to other provinces and regions because as of the moment we consider this province as isolated."

== Airlines and destinations ==
Airlines	Destinations
PAL Express	Cebu

== Statistics ==
Passenger and aircraft movement statistics (2022–2025)

Year	Passengers	Change	Aircraft movements	Change
2022	455	0.0%	16	0.0%
2023	11,338	▲2391.9%	414	▲2487.5%
2024	11,207	▼1.2%	193	▼53.4%
2025	15,806	▲41.0%	291	▲50.8%
