= Eastern Samar =

Eastern Samar Silangang Samar (Filipino)
- Province
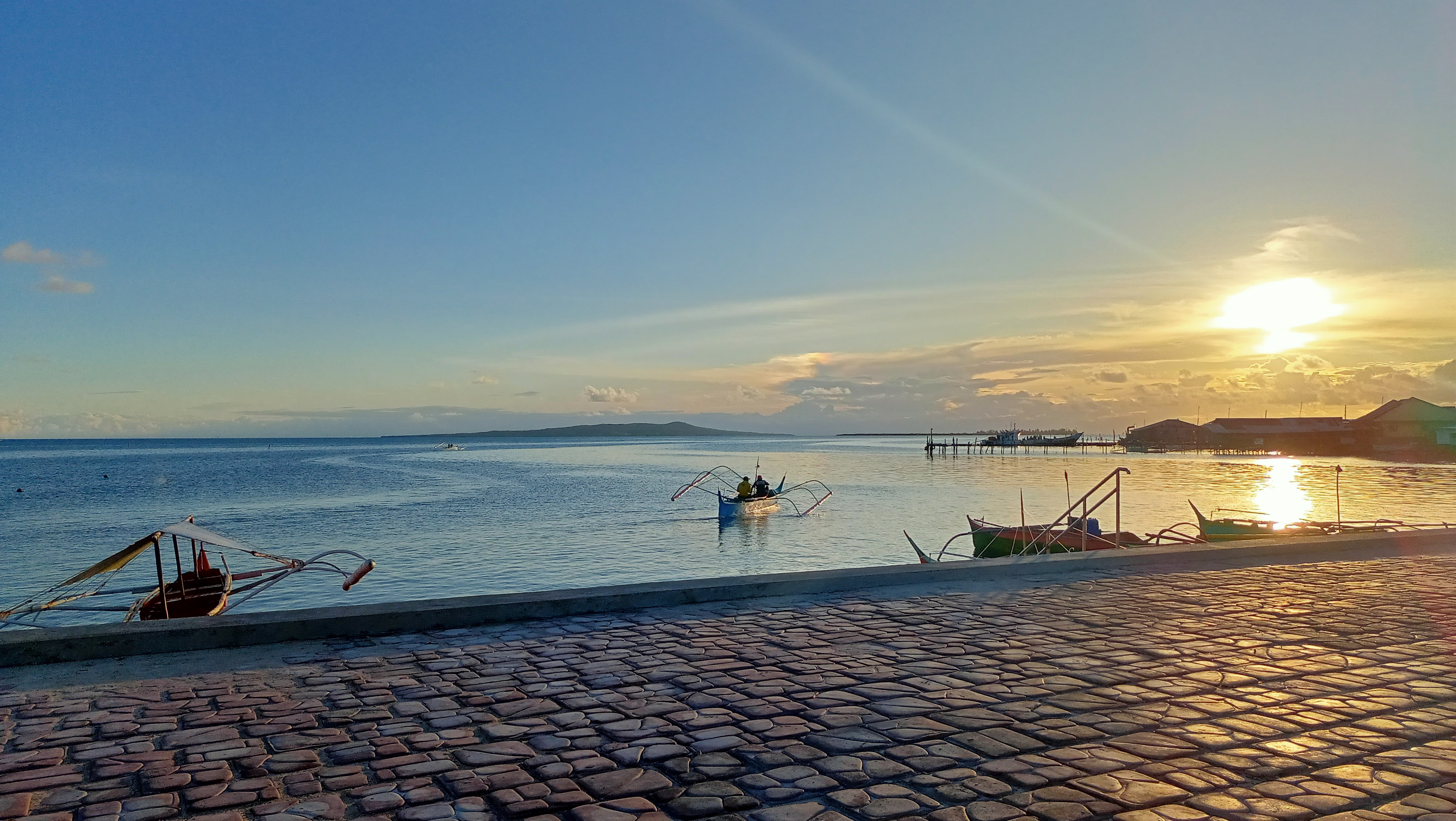
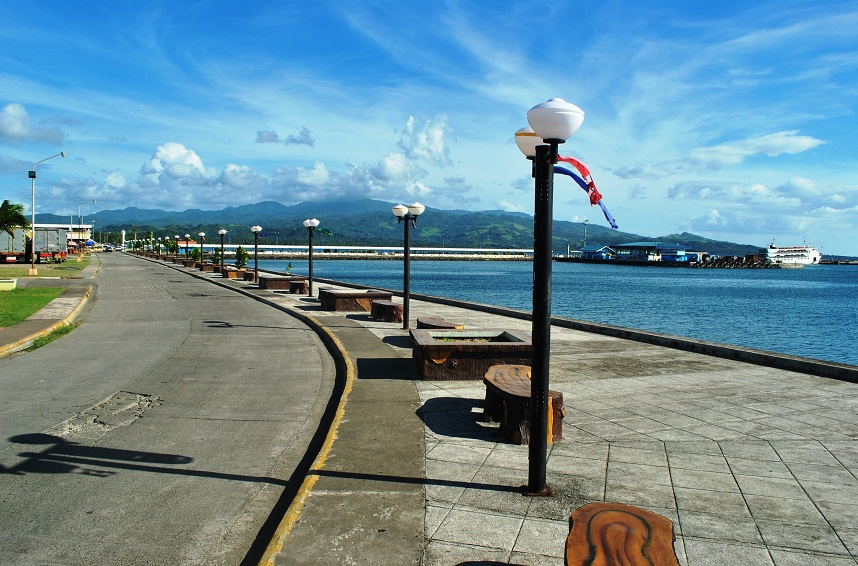
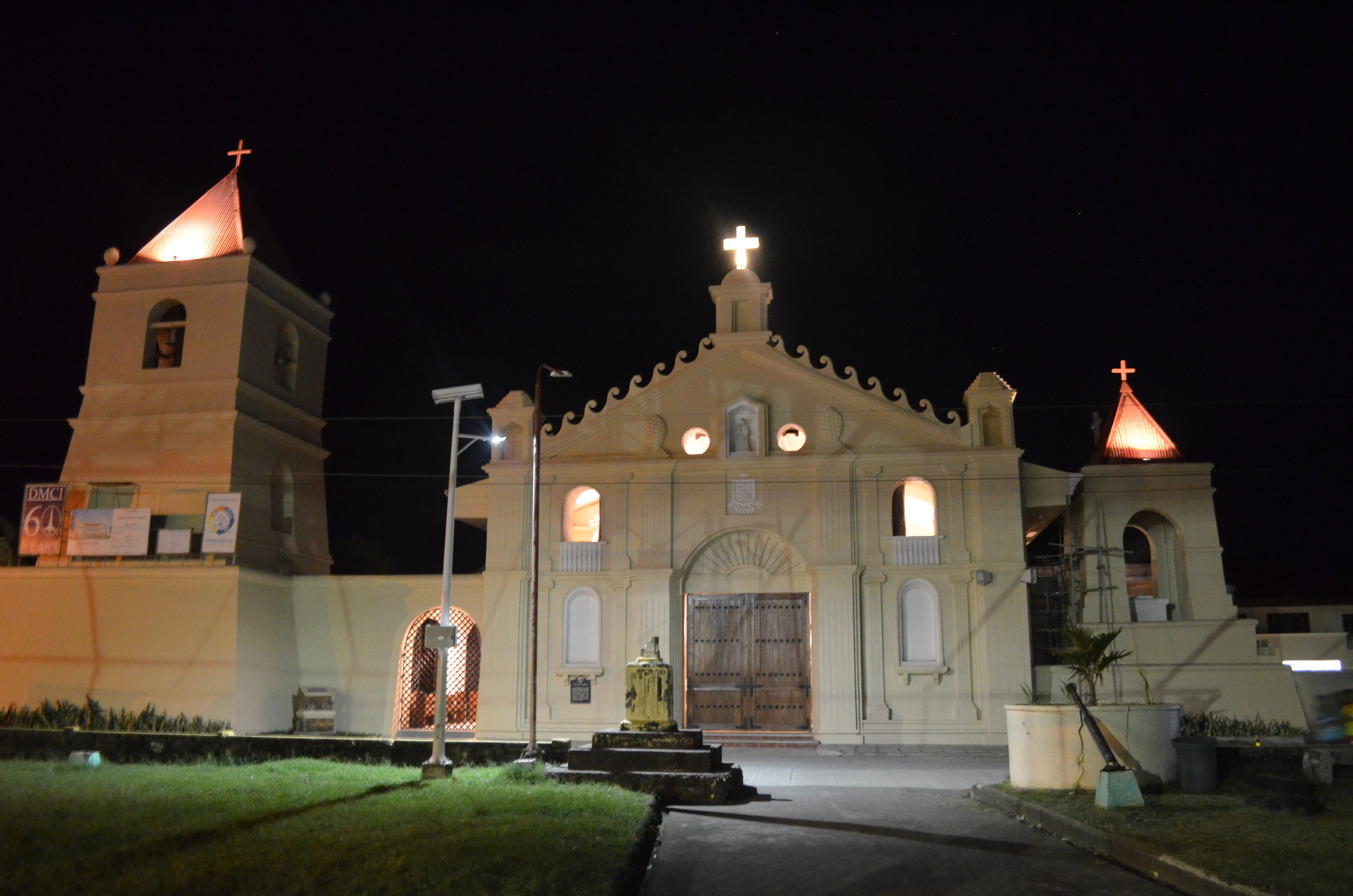
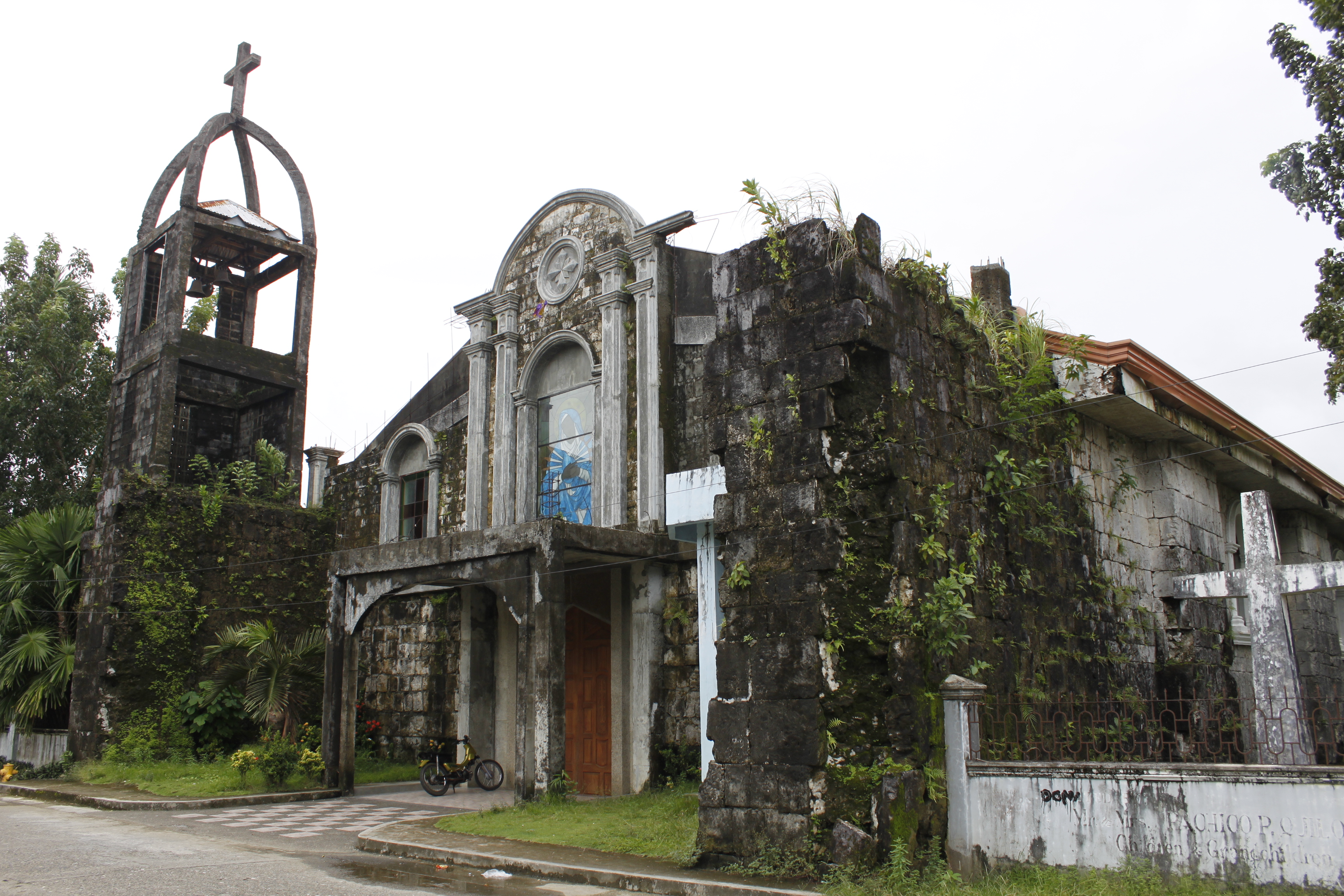
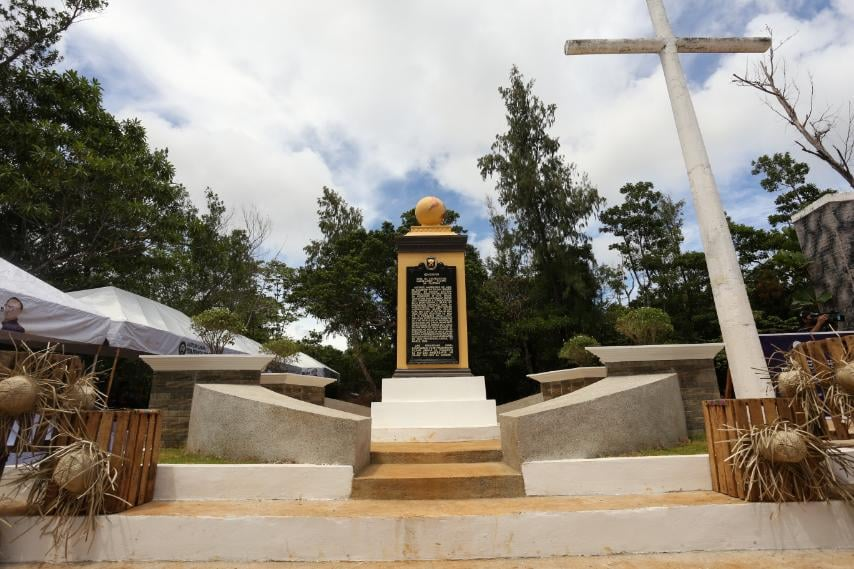
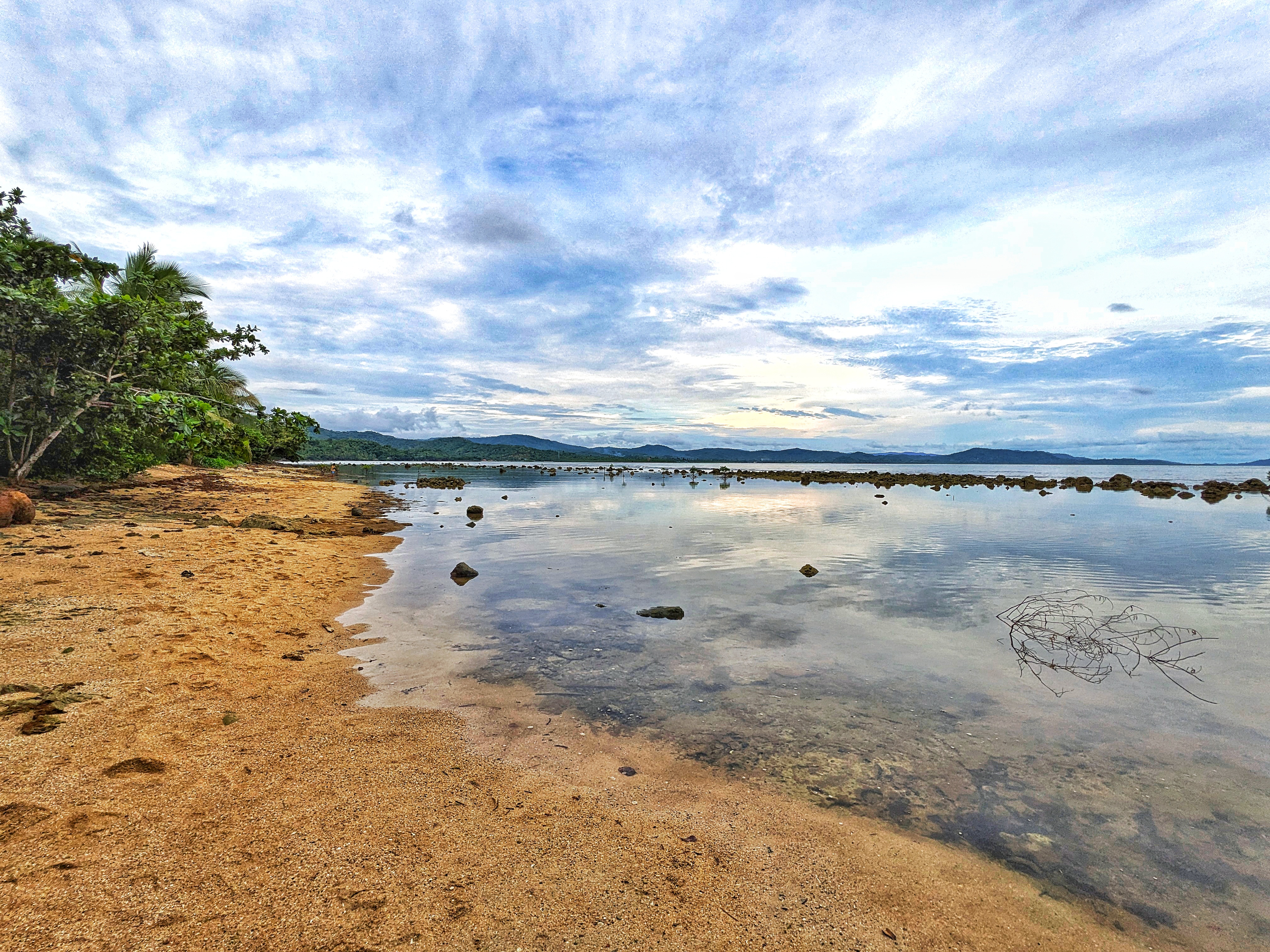
- (from top: left to right) Port section of the Guiuan Integrated Transport Terminal, Baybay Boulevard in Borongan, Balangiga Church, Church of San Julian, Homonhon and Olot Beach.

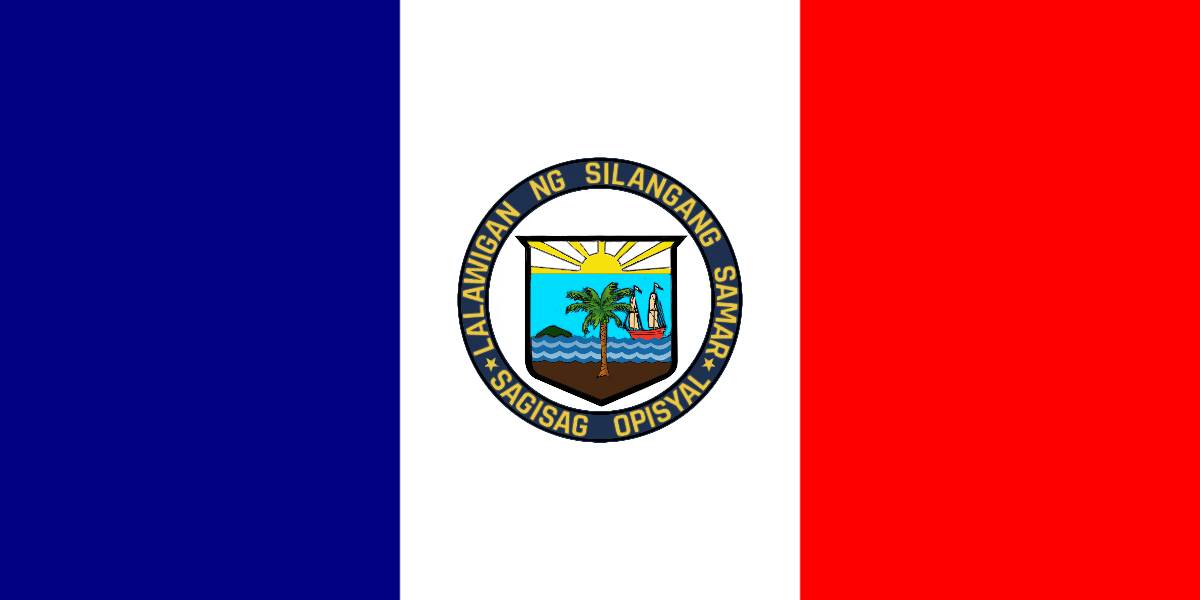
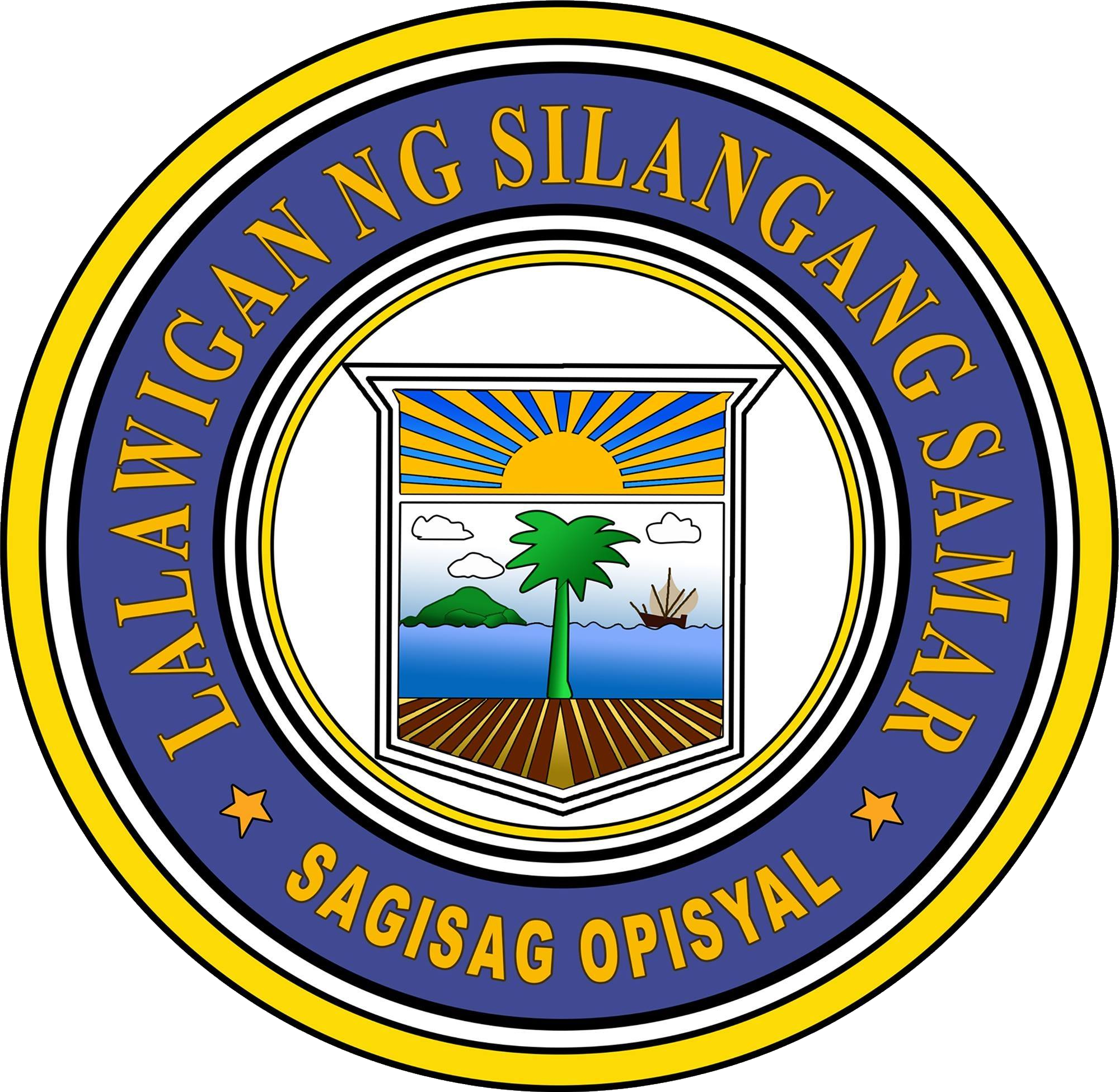
- Flag Seal

- Location in the Philippines
- Interactive map of Eastern Samar
- Coordinates: 11°40′N 125°25′E
- Country: Philippines
- Region: Eastern Visayas
- Founded: June 11, 1965
- Ratified: November 14, 1967
- Capital and largest city: Borongan

Government
  - Governor: Ralph Vincent M. Evardone (PFP)
  - Vice Governor: Maria Caridad S. Goteesan (PFP)
  - Representative: Sheen Gonzales
  - Legislature: Eastern Samar Provincial Board
  - Electorate: 359,570 voters (2025)

Area
  - Total: 4,660.47 km^{2} (1,799.42 sq mi)
  - Rank: 24th out of 82
- Highest elevation (Mount Mactaon): 673 m (2,208 ft)

Population (2024 census)
  - Total: 472,683
  - Rank: 60th out of 82
  - Density: 101.424/km^{2} (262.687/sq mi)
  - Rank: 69th out of 82
  - Households: 115,777

Divisions
  - Independent cities: 0
  - Component cities: 1: Borongan
  - Municipalities: 22: Arteche; Balangiga; Balangkayan; Can-avid; Dolores; General MacArthur; Giporlos; Guiuan; Hernani; Jipapad; Lawaan; Llorente; Maslog; Maydolong; Mercedes; Oras; Quinapondan; Salcedo; San Julian; San Policarpo; Sulat; Taft
  - Barangays: 597
  - Districts: Legislative districts of Eastern Samar

Economy
  - Income class: 1st provincial income class
  - Poverty incidence: 24.7% (2023)
  - Revenue: ₱ 2,141 million (2024)
  - Assets: ₱ 6,659 million (2024)
  - Expenditure: ₱ 1,857 million (2024)
  - Liabilities: ₱ 1,663 million (2024)
- Time zone: UTC+8 (PHT)
- PSGC: 082600000
- IDD : area code: +63 (0)55
- ISO 3166 code: PH-EAS
- Spoken languages: Waray; Cebuano; Tagalog; English
- Website: www.easternsamar.gov.ph

Eastern Samar (Waray-Waray: Sinirangan Samar; Tagalog: Silangang Samar), officially the Province of Eastern Samar, is a province in the Philippines located in the Eastern Visayas region. Its capital is the city of Borongan, which is the most populous. Eastern Samar occupies the eastern portion of the island of Samar. Bordering the province to the north is the province of Northern Samar and to the west is Samar province. To the east lies the Philippine Sea, part of the vast Pacific Ocean, while to the south lies Leyte Gulf.

== History ==
=== Spanish colonial era ===
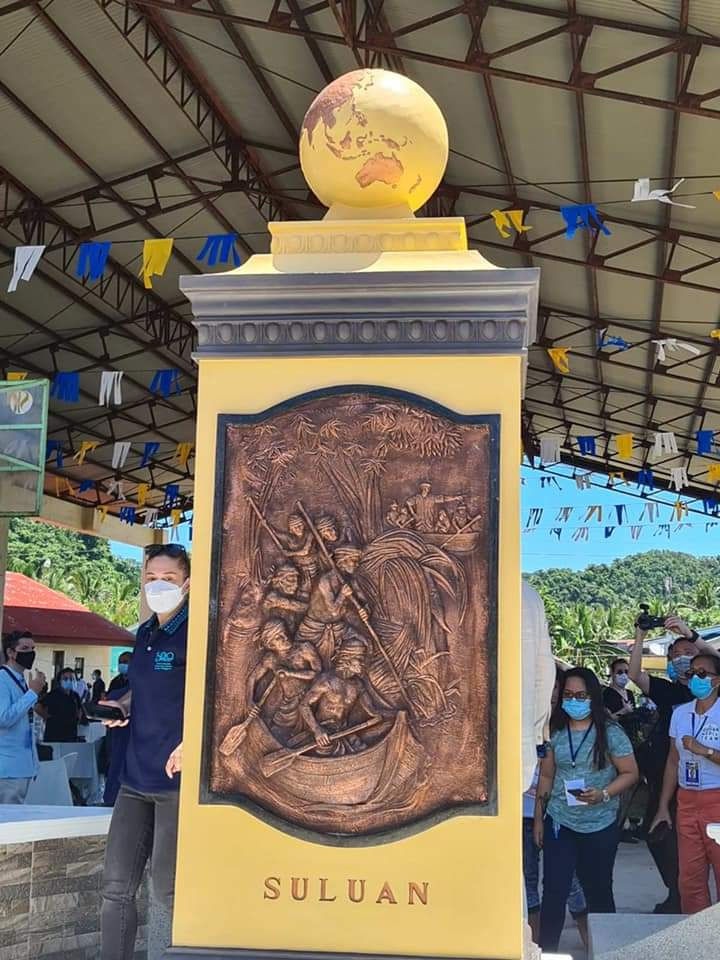
Quincentennial historical marker of Ferdinand Magellan's arrival in Suluan, Guiuan

During his circumnavigation of the globe, Ferdinand Magellan had set foot on the tiny island of Homonhon in the southern part of the province. On March 16, 1521, the area of what is now Eastern Samar is said to be the first Philippine landmass spotted by Magellan and his crew.

In 1596, many names, such as Samal, Ibabao, and Tandaya, were given to Samar Island prior to the coming of the Spaniards in 1596. During the early days of Spanish occupation, Samar was under the jurisdiction of Cebu. Samar and Leyte were later separated from Cebu in 1735. They were split in 1747 but was reversed in 1762 with the approval of the King of Spain, following complaints from the Jesuits. The province of Samar was later established as a distinct province in 1768 after it got separated from the province of Leyte. In 1777, Samar and Leyte split for the last time when it was approved in Madrid in 1786 and had been effective in 1799.

=== American colonial era ===
==== Philippine-American War ====
Maj. Eugenio Daza Area Commander of General Lukbán's forces for Southeastern Samar

=== Japanese occupation ===
In 1944, combined Filipino-American troops involved in the liberation of the Philippines from Japan built in the town of Guiuan the largest military base in the Pacific. In the same town in 1949, approximately 5,000 Russian refugees escaping from communist China temporarily settled on Tubabao Island until 1951, when they were transferred to Australia and the United States.

=== Philippine independence ===
==== Foundation ====
Eastern Samar, as a province, was created from Samar province through Republic Act No. 4221 on June 19, 1965. Approved by Congress in 1963, it was authored by Samar congressmen Eladio T. Balite (1st district), Fernando R. Veloso (2nd district), and Felipe J. Abrigo (3rd district). The law, ratified in a plebiscite on June 19, 1965, divided Samar into three: Northern Samar, Eastern Samar and (Western) Samar. The first provincial officials of Eastern Samar, aside from the lone district representative, were elected on November 14, 1967, and on January 1, 1968, they officially assumed office.

=== Contemporary ===
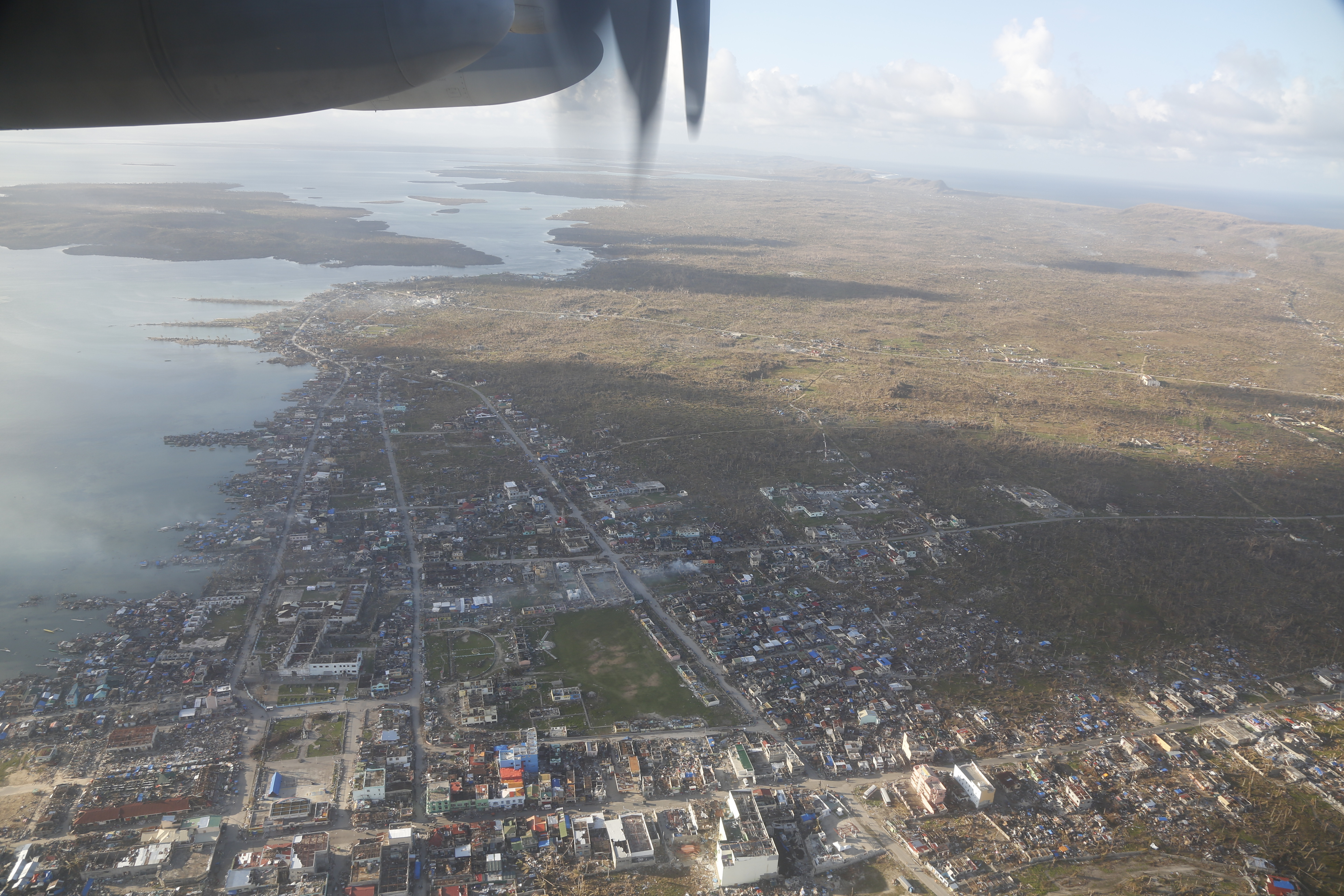
Aerial view of Guiuan in November 2013 on the aftermath of Typhoon Haiyan (Yolanda)

The capital town of Borongan became a component city by virtue of Republic Act No. 9394 which sought to convert the municipality into a city. The law was ratified on June 21, 2007. However, the cityhood status was lost twice in the years 2008 and 2010 after the LCP questioned the validity of the cityhood law. The cityhood status was reaffirmed after the court finalized its ruling on February 15, 2011, declaring the cityhood law constitutional.

Typhoon Haiyan (Yolanda), one of the strongest typhoons ever recorded, made its first landfall in the coastal town of Guiuan in November 2013.

== Geography ==
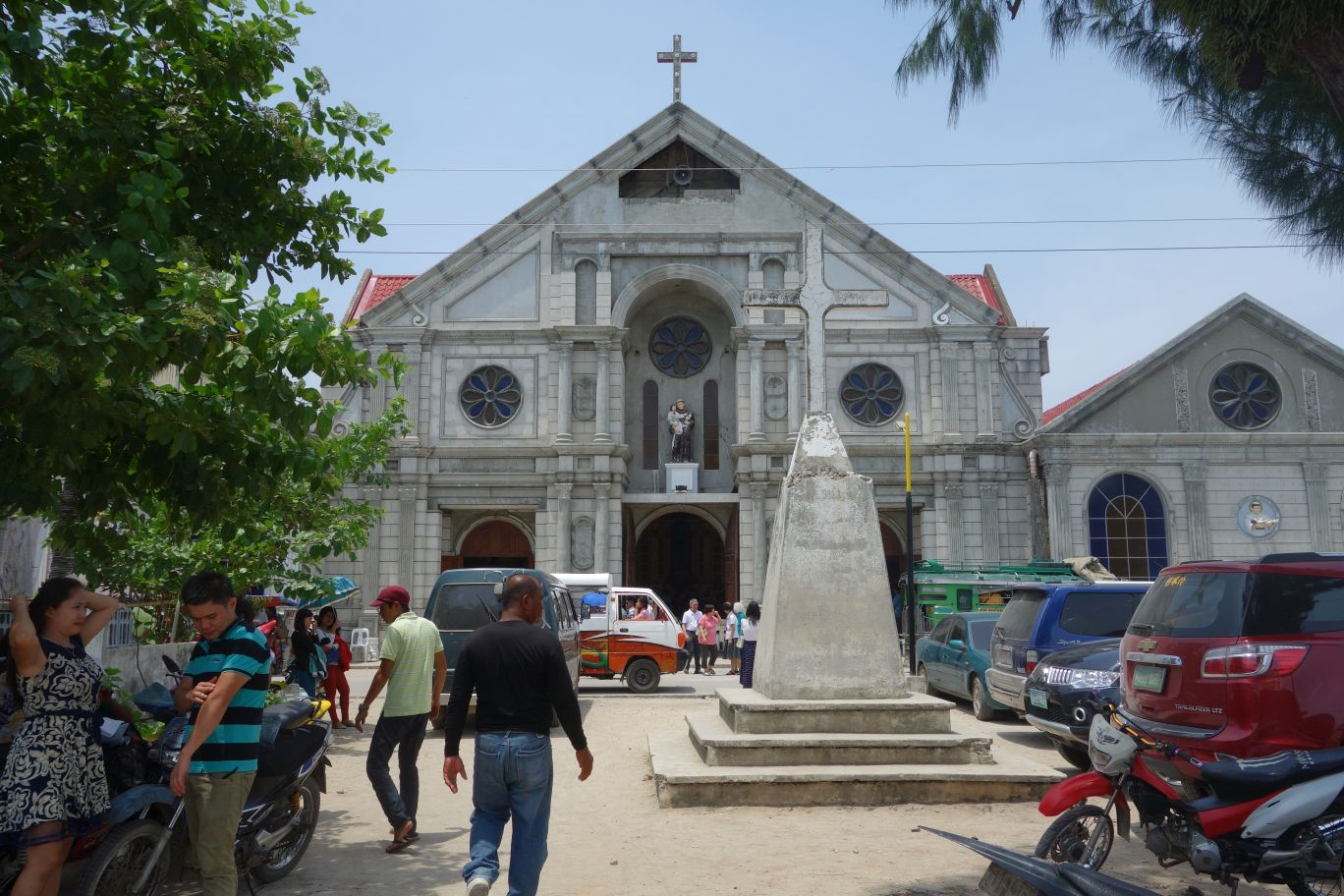
Church in Sulangan Island.

Eastern Samar covers a total area of 4,660.47 square kilometers (1,799.42 sq mi) occupying the eastern section and majority of southern Samar's coast of Samar Island in the Eastern Visayas region. The province is bordered to the north by Northern Samar and to the west by Samar. To the east lies the Philippine Sea, part of the vast Pacific Ocean, while to the south lies Leyte Gulf.

Because it faces the Philippine Sea of the Pacific Ocean, Eastern Samar suffers heavily from powerful typhoons.

=== Administrative divisions ===
Eastern Samar comprises 22 municipalities and one city, all encompassed by an two congressional districts and two provincial districts that elect a representative and provincial board members, respectively.

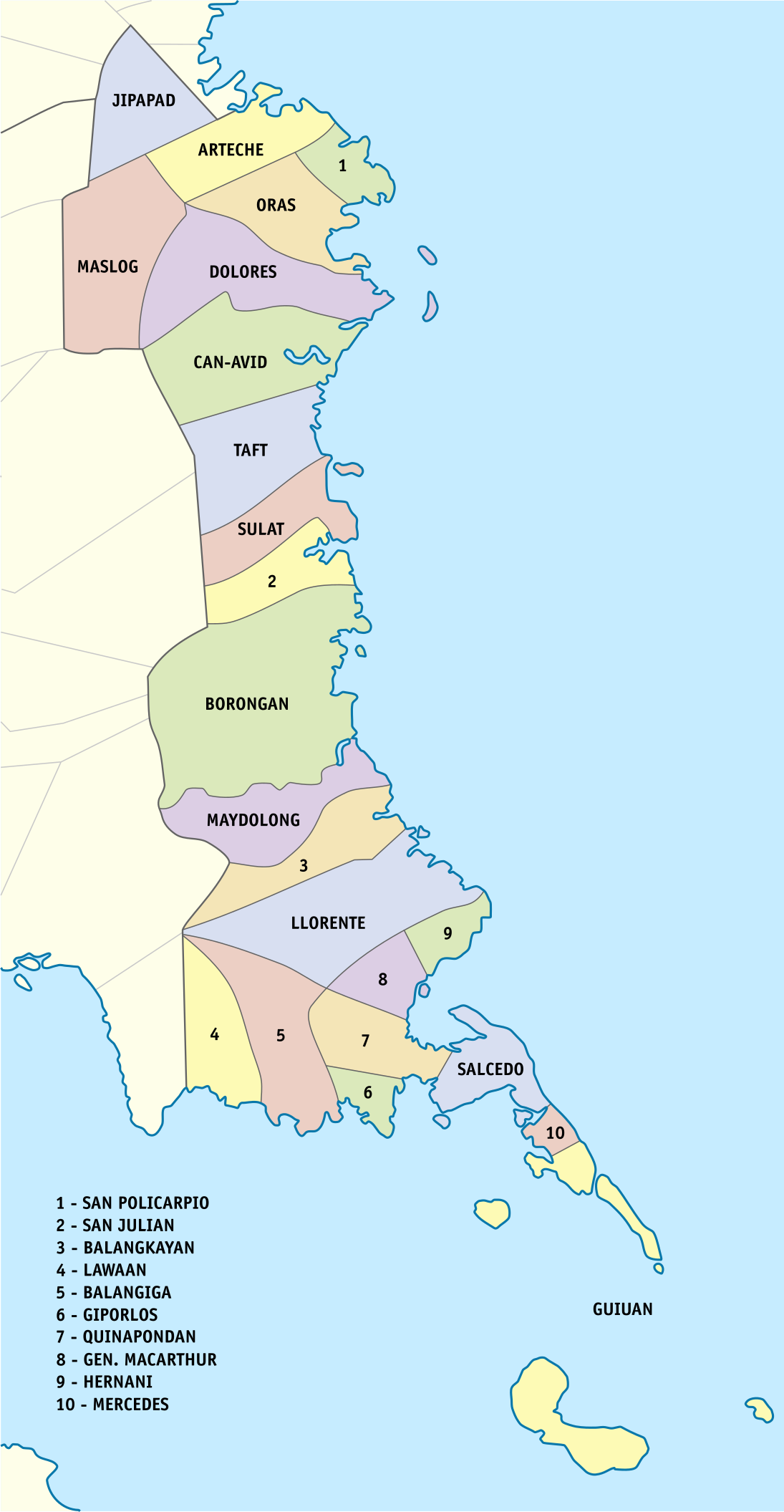
Political divisions of Eastern Samar

City or municipality (Note: The globe icon marks the city/town center.)		Population			±% p.a.	Area		Density		Barangay
		(2020)		(2015)		km^{2}	sq mi	/km^{2}	/sq mi	
Arteche		3.4%	16,360	16,026	+0.39%	138.81	53.59	120	310	20
Balangiga		3.0%	14,341	14,085	+0.34%	190.05	73.38	75	190	13
Balangkayan		2.1%	10,185	10,125	+0.11%	207.05	79.94	49	130	15
Borongan City	†	15.1%	71,961	69,297	+0.72%	475.00	183.40	150	390	61
Can-avid		4.5%	21,682	21,015	+0.60%	288.70	111.47	75	190	28
Dolores		9.4%	44,626	42,866	+0.77%	308.58	119.14	140	360	46
General MacArthur		3.0%	14,411	14,550	−0.18%	117.29	45.29	120	310	30
Giporlos		2.7%	13,117	13,308	−0.27%	97.51	37.65	130	340	18
Guiuan		11.2%	53,361	52,991	+0.13%	175.49	67.76	300	780	60
Hernani		1.8%	8,531	8,573	−0.09%	49.42	19.08	170	440	13
Jipapad		1.8%	8,439	7,885	+1.30%	234.80	90.66	36	93	13
Lawaan		2.7%	13,003	12,742	+0.39%	162.56	62.76	80	210	16
Llorente		4.5%	21,459	20,149	+1.21%	496.07	191.53	43	110	33
Maslog		1.1%	5,463	5,407	+0.20%	249.80	96.45	22	57	12
Maydolong		3.2%	15,314	14,743	+0.73%	399.63	154.30	38	98	20
Mercedes		1.3%	6,112	6,070	+0.13%	23.32	9.00	260	670	16
Oras		7.8%	37,451	36,540	+0.47%	188.70	72.86	200	520	42
Quinapondan		3.0%	14,507	14,779	−0.35%	83.24	32.14	170	440	25
Salcedo		4.6%	22,136	22,532	−0.34%	113.80	43.94	190	490	41
San Julian		3.1%	14,800	14,498	+0.39%	150.62	58.15	98	250	16
San Policarpo		3.2%	15,365	14,687	+0.86%	65.70	25.37	230	600	17
Sulat		3.3%	15,758	15,377	+0.47%	169.75	65.54	93	240	18
Taft		3.9%	18,786	18,915	−0.13%	231.27	89.29	81	210	24
Total			477,168	467,160	+0.40%	4,617.16	1,782.70	100	260	597
	† Provincial capital and component city					Municipality				

== Demographics ==
Population census of Eastern Samar
Year	Pop.	±% p.a.
1903	79,645	—
1918	117,348	+2.62%
1939	154,347	+1.31%
1948	197,734	+2.79%
1960	237,747	+1.55%
1970	271,000	+1.32%
1975	287,149	+1.17%
1980	320,637	+2.23%
1990	329,335	+0.27%
1995	362,324	+1.80%
2000	375,822	+0.79%
2007	405,114	+1.04%
2010	428,877	+2.10%
2015	467,160	+1.64%
2020	477,168	+0.45%
2024	472,683	−0.23%
Source: Philippine Statistics Authority

The population of Eastern Samar in the 2024 census was 472,683 people, with a density of 100 inhabitants per square kilometre or 260 inhabitants per square mile. The predominant language is Waray and it is the main lingua franca of the entire island of Samar.

In the 2000 Census, Warays comprised 97.78% (366,787) of the total provincial population of 375,124 at that time. Kapampangan came second at 0.55% (2,067), Bisaya/Binisaya 0.43% (1,613), Cebuano at 0.18% (680), and Tagalog at 0.17% (621).

Population by ethnicity (2000)
Ethnicity	Number
Waray	366,787 (97.78%)
Kapampangan	2,067 (0.55%)
Bisaya/Binisaya	1,613 (0.43%)
Cebuano	680 (0.18%)
Tagalog	621 (0.17%)
Others	2,510 (0.67%)
Not Reported	846 (0.23%)

=== Religion ===
==== Catholicism ====
The people of the province are devoted Catholics where a majority adhere to Roman Catholicism. The dominant Catholic faith influences the events of the provincial education, politics and social functions of the people.

==== Others ====
Other Christians usually form the remaining groups of believers such as the Born-again Christians, Protestants, Iglesia Filipina Independiente or Aglipayan church, Jehovah's Witnesses, Iglesia ni Cristo, Baptists, Methodists, The Church of Jesus Christ of Latter-day Saints, and Seventh-day Adventists. Non Christians (mostly Muslims) are also found.

== Transportation ==
The province has one operational airport; Borongan Airport located in the capital city. Currently, only Leascor operates out of Borongan Airport with flights weekly to serve locals and tourists to and from Cebu.

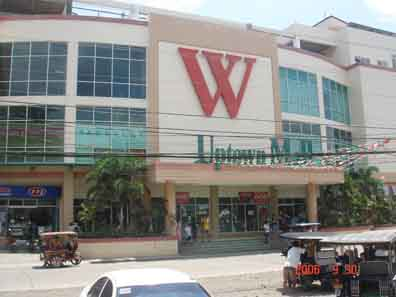
Borongan's Wilsam Uptown Mall, the largest shopping mall in the province

By land, mini buses and vans ply from the regional center in Tacloban, Catbalogan, and Calbayog in Samar province and to some towns in Eastern Samar. From Borongan, buses ply to Metro Manila. Motorized boats plies through Leyte Gulf ferrying passengers going to Tacloban City seaport.

== Economy ==
Poverty incidence of Eastern Samar (%)

Source: Philippine Statistics Authority

Commercial activities in the province are centered on the provincial capital of Borongan while tourism activities are centered in Guiuan town where Calicoan Island and the historical Homonhon Island are located. Generally, the province's major economic resource is fishery and agriculture which include production of coconut, copra, corn, rice, sugar, and vegetables. Tourism potential is untapped on the northern part of the province.

== Government ==
Current Provincial Government Officials (2025-2028)

- Governor: Ralph Vincent M. Evardone (PFP)
- Vice-Governor: Maria Cardidad S. Goteesan (PFP)

Sangguniang Panlalawigan Members

1st District

- Philip C. Evardone Jr. (PFP)
- Byron M. Suyot (PFP)
- Virginia R. Zacarte (PFP)
- Estanislao N. Quelitano Jr. (PFP)
- Ma. Timotea C. Barizo (PFP)

2nd District

- Mark Pol P. Gonzales (PFP)
- Adel Jo Christelle G. Yadao (PFP)
- Susana Lourdes B. Gaylon (PFP)
- Pearl Fatima L. Evardone (PFP)
- Nesty Anthony R. Cablao (PFP)

Ex-Officio Members

- Eloise P. Evardone (President, Liga ng mga Barangay)
- TBD (President, PCL)
- Gilberto Germino Jr. (President, Panlalawigang Pederasyon ng Sangguniang Kabataan)

== House of Representatives ==
District	Representative	Party	Term	Bloc
Lone	Christopher Sheen P. Gonzales	NUP	1	Minority

== Notable people ==
- Boy Abunda - television host, publicist, talent manager and celebrity endorser.
- Maria Fe Abunda - politician; Eastern Samar's representative in the House of Representatives of the Philippines. 8th and 19th Congress.
- Aster Amoyo - entertainment writer, television host, and talent manager.
- Gabrielle Camille Basiano - model and beauty pageant titleholder, Binibining Pilipinas Intercontinental 2022.
- K Brosas - actress, comedienne and singer.
- Eugenio Daza - Area Commander Southeastern Samar during the Philippine-American War. Organizer of the Balangiga Encounter. Rep. of Samar's 3rd District to the First Philippine Legislature.
- Gabriel Daza - Knight Commander with Star of the Order of St. Sylvester, knighted by Pope Pius XII. Co-founder Boy Scouts of the Philippines.
- R-Ji Lim - singer, actor and model; member of P-pop group Alamat.
- Jewel Ponferada - PBA professional basketball player, currently playing for Rain or Shine Elasto Painters.
- Art Ramasasa - singer, songwriter and musician in the Waray-Waray language.
- Mastermind - dance group, made popular in their performance in Pilipinas Got Talent season 5. They finally settled for 4th place in the Grand Finals.
- Freddie Abuda - retired professional basketball player, currently serving as an assistant coach to the San Beda Red Lions (NCAA).
- Lutgardo Barbo - Former governor of Eastern Samar, Candidate for the 2022 Senate Elections.
- Marcelino Libanan - Filipino politician. Minority Leader 19th and 20th Congress. 4P's Partylist Representative
- Ben Evardone - Congressman of Eastern Samar and 6th Governor of Eastern Samar.
- RV Evardone - Governor, Province of Eastern Samar. Former President of the Eastern Samar chapter of the Philippine Councilors League,
- Sheen Gonzales - Two-term mayor of Guiuan, Representative, Lone District of Eastern Samar. Assistant Minority Leader of the 2oth Congress.
- Andres Pagaran - poet and songwriter
