= San Policarpo, Eastern Samar =

Municipality in Eastern Samar, Philippines

San Policarpo
- Municipality
- Municipality of San Policarpo
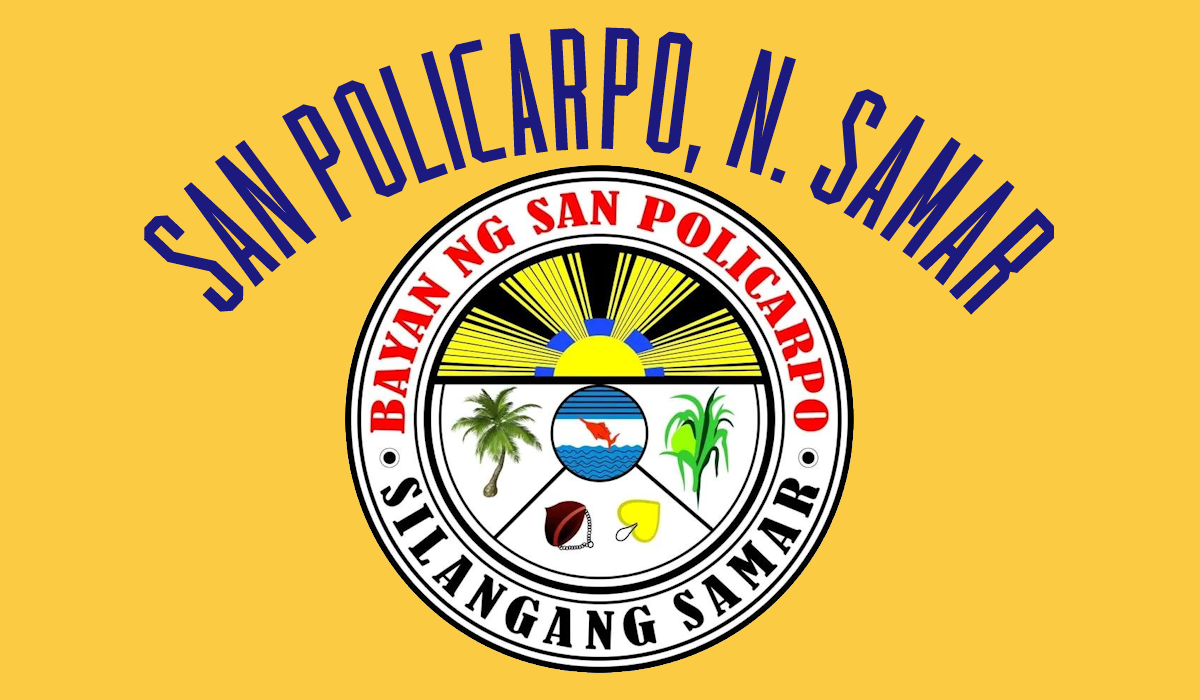
- Flag

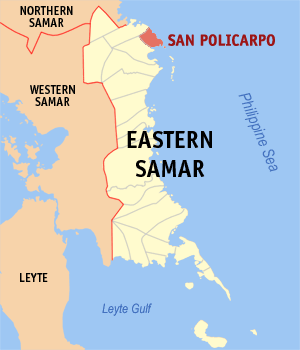
- Map of Eastern Samar with San Policarpo highlighted
- Interactive map of San Policarpo
- Location within the Philippines
- Coordinates: 12°10′45″N 125°30′26″E
- Country: Philippines
- Region: Eastern Visayas
- Province: Eastern Samar
- District: Lone district
- Founded: June 16, 1948
- Inaugurated: February 5, 1949
- Barangays: 17 (see Barangays)

Government
  - Type: Sangguniang Bayan
  - Mayor: Conrado U. Nicart III
  - Vice Mayor: Thelma U. Nicart
  - Representative: Maria Fe R. Abunda
  - Councilors: List: • Editha N. Rebmann; • Marshall O. Morallos; • Daniel M. Calda; • Thomas T. Jata-as; • Mae B. Bonafe; • Edito G. Mengote; • Cayetano N. Baldoza; • Bonifacio R. Nicart; DILG Masterlist of Officials
  - Electorate: 12,892 voters (2025)

Area
  - Total: 78 km^{2} (30 sq mi)
- Elevation: 6.0 m (19.7 ft)
- Highest elevation: 63 m (207 ft)
- Lowest elevation: 0 m (0 ft)

Population (2024 census)
  - Total: 15,597
  - Density: 200/km^{2} (520/sq mi)
  - Households: 3,602

Economy
  - Income class: 4th municipal income class
  - Poverty incidence: 36.34% (2023)
  - Revenue: ₱ 106.3 million (2024)
  - Assets: ₱ 397.5 million (2024)
  - Expenditure: ₱ 108.7 million (2024)
  - Liabilities: ₱ 244.2 million (2024)

Service provider
  - Electricity: Eastern Samar Electric Cooperative (ESAMELCO)
- Time zone: UTC+8 (PST)
- ZIP code: 6821
- PSGC: 0802621000
- IDD : area code: +63 (0)55
- Native languages: Waray; Tagalog
- Website: www.sanpolicarpo-esamar.gov.ph

San Policarpo, officially the Municipality of San Policarpo (Waray: Bungto han San Policarpo; Tagalog: Bayan ng San Policarpo), is a municipality in the province of Eastern Samar, Philippines. According to the 2024 census, it has a population of 15,597 people.

In the north-west, it is bounded by Arteche, in the north-east by the vast Pacific Ocean and in the south by Oras.

== History ==
San Policarpo was established as a barrio in 1837. The Municipality of San Policarpo was created from the barrios of San Policarpo, Bahay, Alugan, Pangpang, Japunan, Tabo, Binogawan and Cajagwayan of the municipality of Oras, then in the old province of Samar, by virtue of Republic Act No. 281 signed on June 16, 1948 and inaugurated on February 5, 1949. In 1952, the barrio of Santa Monica was transferred from Oras to San Policarpo. On June 19, 1965, the municipality was annexed to the newly-established province of Eastern Samar through a plebiscite and the sitios of Santa Cruz, Tan-awan, Bangon, Guin-osokan, Barras, Lipata and Libas were converted into barrios.

The town was formerly named "Bunga", derived from the plant called bunga which was very abundant in the present site of the town. "Bunga" means fruit, thus the name indicates the fruit of the toils of its founders.

== Geography ==
=== Barangays ===
San Policarpo is politically subdivided into 17 barangays. Each barangay consists of puroks and some have sitios.

- Alugan
- Bahay
- Bangon
- Baras (Lipata)
- Binogawan
- Cajagwayan
- Japunan
- Natividad
- Pangpang
- Barangay No. 1 (Poblacion)
- Barangay No. 2 (Poblacion)
- Barangay No. 3 (Poblacion)
- Barangay No. 4 (Poblacion)
- Barangay No. 5 (Poblacion)
- Santa Cruz
- Tabo
- Tanauawan

=== Climate ===
Climate data for San Policarpo, Eastern Samar
Month	Jan	Feb	Mar	Apr	May	Jun	Jul	Aug	Sep	Oct	Nov	Dec	Year
Mean daily maximum °C (°F)	27 (81)	27 (81)	28 (82)	29 (84)	30 (86)	30 (86)	30 (86)	30 (86)	29 (84)	29 (84)	28 (82)	27 (81)	29 (84)
Mean daily minimum °C (°F)	23 (73)	22 (72)	22 (72)	23 (73)	24 (75)	24 (75)	24 (75)	24 (75)	24 (75)	24 (75)	24 (75)	23 (73)	23 (74)
Average precipitation mm (inches)	105 (4.1)	67 (2.6)	65 (2.6)	53 (2.1)	86 (3.4)	129 (5.1)	135 (5.3)	113 (4.4)	131 (5.2)	163 (6.4)	167 (6.6)	162 (6.4)	1,376 (54.2)
Average rainy days	17.6	13.2	15.5	14.9	19.6	24.3	26.6	25.4	24.9	25.4	22.9	20.9	251.2
Source: Meteoblue

== Demographics ==
Population census of San Policarpo
Year	Pop.	±% p.a.
1948	4,779	—
1960	8,051	+4.44%
1970	9,140	+1.28%
1975	9,280	+0.31%
1980	12,258	+5.72%
1990	9,970	−2.05%
1995	11,565	+2.82%
2000	12,403	+1.51%
2007	13,689	+1.37%
2010	13,836	+0.39%
2015	14,687	+1.14%
2020	15,365	+0.95%
2024	15,597	+0.36%
Source: Philippine Statistics Authority

The population of San Policarpo, Eastern Samar, in the 2024 census was 15,597 people, with a density of 200 inhabitants per square kilometer or 520 inhabitants per square mile.

== Economy ==
Poverty incidence of San Policarpo (%)

Source: Philippine Statistics Authority

The local economy of San Policarpo, one of the country's poorest towns, is dependent on fishing and farming.
