= Taft, Eastern Samar =

Municipality in Eastern Samar, Philippines

Taft Tubig
- Municipality
- Municipality of Taft
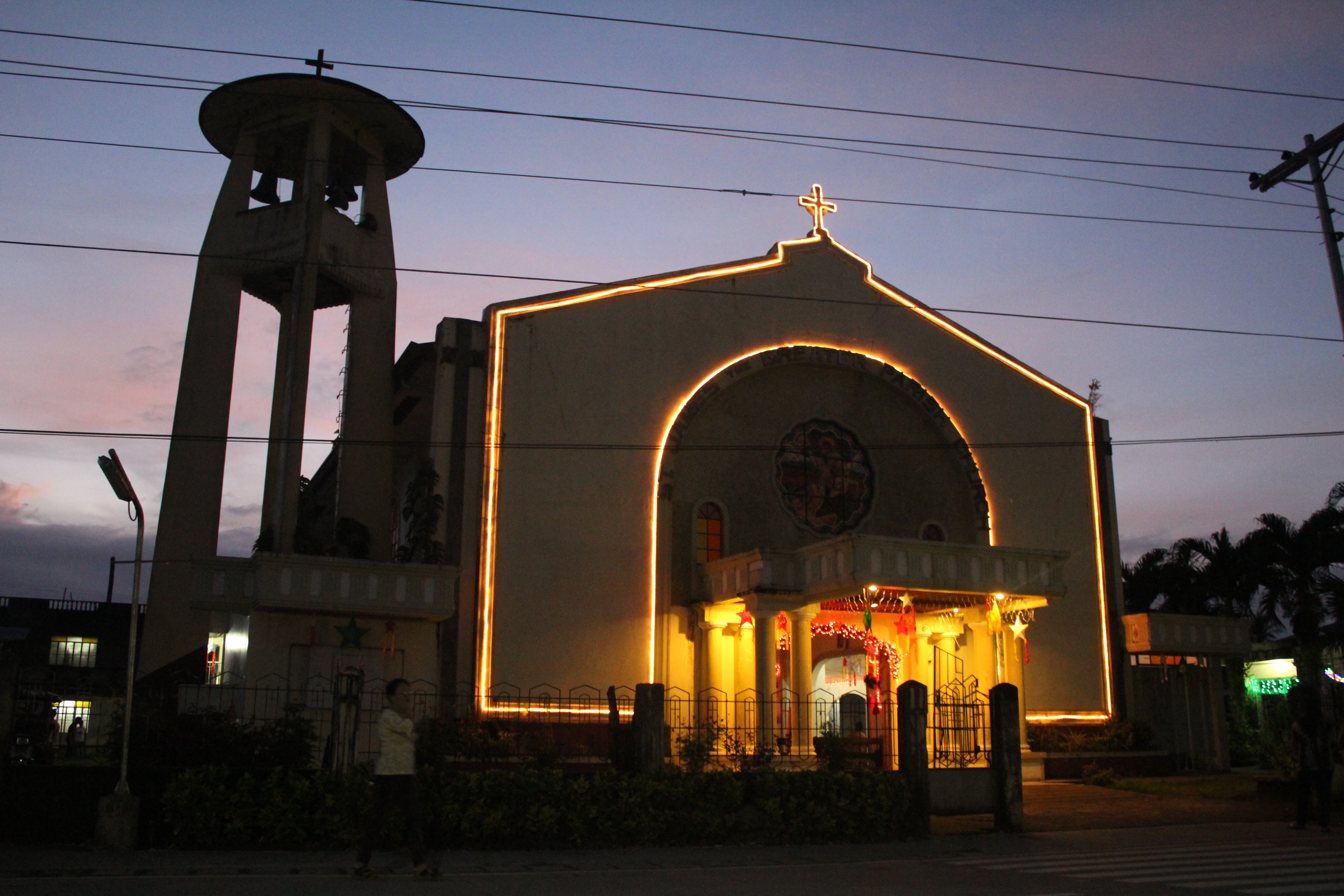
- St. James the Greater Parish Church

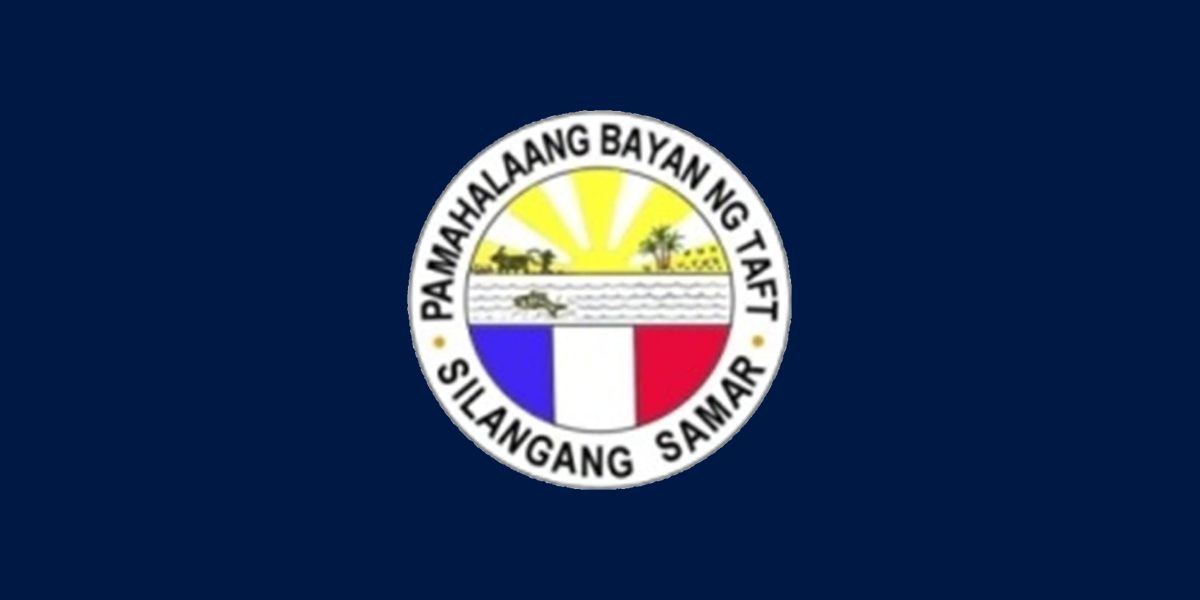
- Flag
- Motto: Diri natumba, naluros nala
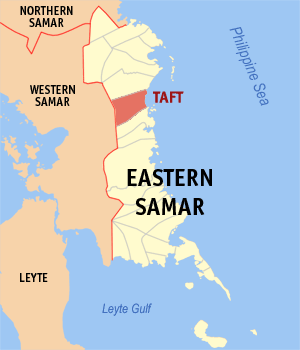
- Map of Eastern Samar with Taft highlighted
- Interactive map of Taft
- Location within the Philippines
- Coordinates: 11°54′21″N 125°25′05″E
- Country: Philippines
- Region: Eastern Visayas
- Province: Eastern Samar
- District: Lone district
- Named for: William Howard Taft
- Barangays: 24 (see Barangays)

Government
  - Type: Sangguniang Bayan
  - Mayor: Gina A. Ty
  - Vice Mayor: Ma. Concepcion A. Hilario
  - Representative: Maria Fe R. Abunda
  - Councilors: List: • Rosjane T. White; • Aldwin Matthew S. Ty; • Myra S. Sudario; • Ma. Alma D. Balibag; • Salvador C. Araya; • Pascual A. Docena; • Marvin Paul C. Lim; • Norma A. Dacuyan; DILG Masterlist of Officials
  - Electorate: 15,002 voters (2025)

Area
  - Total: 231.27 km^{2} (89.29 sq mi)
- Elevation: 22 m (72 ft)
- Highest elevation: 129 m (423 ft)
- Lowest elevation: 0 m (0 ft)

Population (2024 census)
  - Total: 18,692
  - Density: 80.823/km^{2} (209.33/sq mi)
  - Households: 4,764

Economy
  - Income class: 3rd municipal income class
  - Poverty incidence: 31.79% (2023)
  - Revenue: ₱ 159.2 million (2024)
  - Assets: ₱ 388 million (2024)
  - Expenditure: ₱ 143.5 million (2024)
  - Liabilities: ₱ 84.68 million (2024)

Service provider
  - Electricity: Eastern Samar Electric Cooperative (ESAMELCO)
- Time zone: UTC+8 (PST)
- ZIP code: 6816
- PSGC: 0802623000
- IDD : area code: +63 (0)55
- Native languages: Waray; Tagalog
- Website: taft-esamar.gov.ph

Taft, officially the Municipality of Taft (Waray: Bungto han Taft; Tagalog: Bayan ng Taft), is a municipality in the province of Eastern Samar, Philippines. According to the 2024 census, it has a population of 18,692 people.

It is bounded on the north by the town of Can-avid and on the south-southeast by the town of Sulat.

The municipality was named in honor of former United States President William Howard Taft, who served as Governor-General of the Philippines during the first decade of the 20th century.

== History ==
Taft is one of the ancient pueblos in Samar situated in the eastern coast which was called Tubabao or Tubabaw in early times. This town was originally named after the river called Malinaw, but since the river causes heavy floods during rainy season, people began calling the place Tubig, which means water in Waray-Waray.

On October 23, 1903, the municipalities of Paric (present-day Dolores), San Julian, and Sulat were merged into Tubig, which was also renamed Taft after the Governor-General of the Philippines at the time, William Howard Taft. These three municipalities were separated from Taft and restored to their independent statuses on October 31, 1906.

In 1965, following the Samar division plebiscite, Taft became part of the newly established province of Eastern Samar.

== Geography ==
=== Barangays ===
Taft is politically subdivided into 24 barangays. Each barangay consists of puroks and some have sitios.

- Batiawan
- Beto
- Binaloan
- Bongdo
- Dacul
- Danao
- Del Remedios
- Gayam
- Lomatud (Burak)
- Mabuhay
- Malinao
- Mantang
- Nato
- Pangabutan
- Poblacion Barangay 1
- Poblacion Barangay 2
- Poblacion Barangay 3
- Poblacion Barangay 4
- Poblacion Barangay 5
- Poblacion Barangay 6 (Bliss)
- Polangi
- San Luis
- San Pablo
- San Rafael

=== Climate ===
Climate data for Taft, Eastern Samar
Month	Jan	Feb	Mar	Apr	May	Jun	Jul	Aug	Sep	Oct	Nov	Dec	Year
Mean daily maximum °C (°F)	27 (81)	27 (81)	28 (82)	29 (84)	30 (86)	30 (86)	29 (84)	29 (84)	29 (84)	29 (84)	28 (82)	28 (82)	29 (83)
Mean daily minimum °C (°F)	22 (72)	22 (72)	22 (72)	23 (73)	24 (75)	24 (75)	24 (75)	24 (75)	24 (75)	24 (75)	23 (73)	23 (73)	23 (74)
Average precipitation mm (inches)	97 (3.8)	64 (2.5)	69 (2.7)	58 (2.3)	98 (3.9)	161 (6.3)	167 (6.6)	140 (5.5)	158 (6.2)	171 (6.7)	169 (6.7)	154 (6.1)	1,506 (59.3)
Average rainy days	17.1	13.4	14.8	15.2	21.1	25.2	26.8	25.4	25.5	26.5	23.0	20.3	254.3
Source: Meteoblue

== Demographics ==
Population census of Taft
Year	Pop.	±% p.a.
1903	3,031	—
1918	3,866	+1.64%
1939	5,743	+1.90%
1948	7,078	+2.35%
1960	10,463	+3.31%
1970	11,296	+0.77%
1975	12,554	+2.14%
1980	14,545	+2.99%
1990	13,449	−0.78%
1995	16,613	+4.04%
2000	16,435	−0.23%
2007	16,362	−0.06%
2010	17,183	+1.80%
2015	18,915	+1.85%
2020	18,786	−0.14%
2024	18,692	−0.12%
Source: Philippine Statistics Authority

The population of Taft, Eastern Samar, in the 2024 census was 18,692 people, with a density of 81 inhabitants per square kilometre or 210 inhabitants per square mile.

== Economy ==
Poverty incidence of Taft (%)

Source: Philippine Statistics Authority

== Notable personalities ==
- Marcelino Libanan - Filipino politician
- Andres Pagaran - poet and songwriter
