= Salcedo, Eastern Samar =

Municipality in Eastern Samar, Philippines

Salcedo
- Municipality
- Municipality of Salcedo
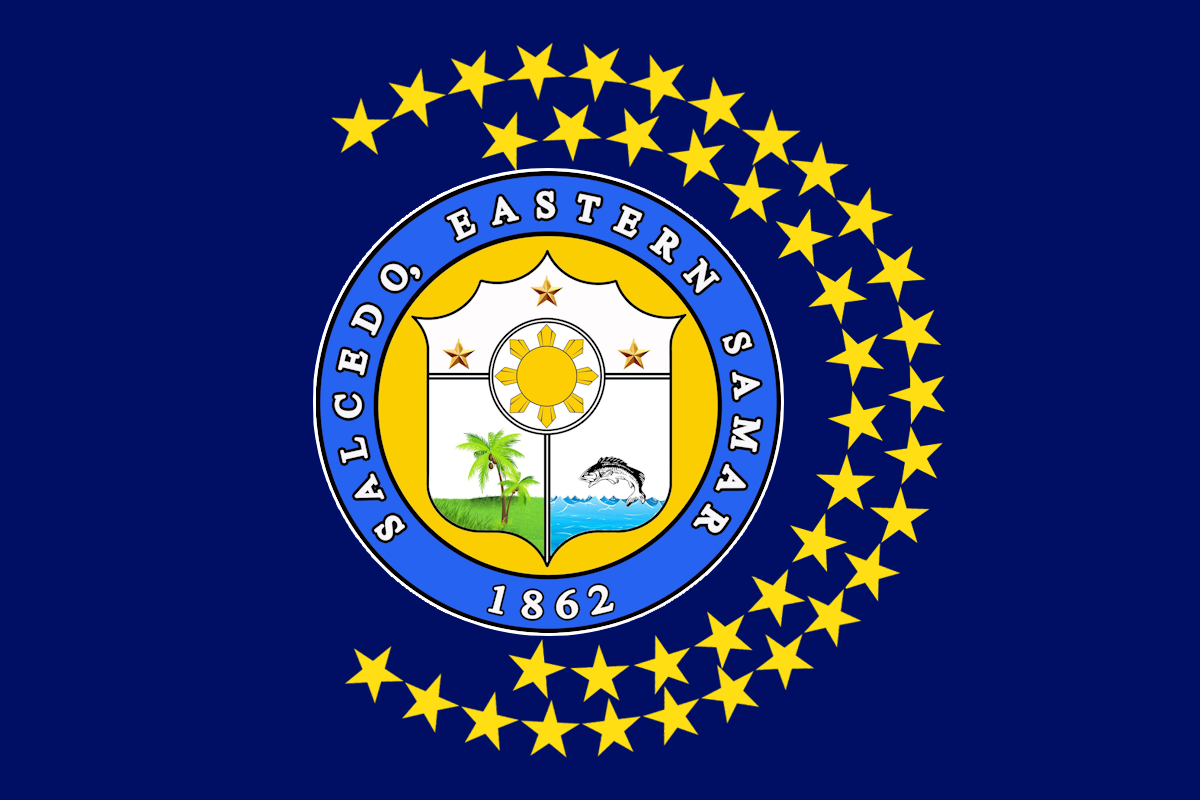
- Flag

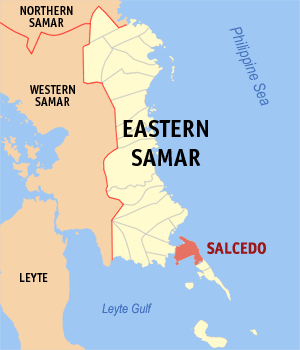
- Map of Eastern Samar with Salcedo highlighted
- Interactive map of Salcedo
- Location within the Philippines
- Coordinates: 11°09′N 125°40′E
- Country: Philippines
- Region: Eastern Visayas
- Province: Eastern Samar
- District: Lone district
- Founded: December 8, 1862
- Named for: Juan de Salcedo
- Barangays: 41 (see Barangays)

Government
  - Type: Sangguniang Bayan
  - Mayor: Melchor L. Mergal
  - Vice Mayor: Christian May T. Lacasa-Machica
  - Representative: Christopher Sheen P. Gonzales
  - Councilors: List: • Michelle Abalorio; • Cesar Cagascas; • Susan Sumook; • Jean Macasa; • Bruno Padullo; • Jaime Miralles; • Leo Gagante; • Utay Fabillar; DILG Masterlist of Officials
  - Electorate: 17,253 voters (2025)

Area
  - Total: 113.8 km^{2} (43.9 sq mi)
- Elevation: 29 m (95 ft)
- Highest elevation: 170 m (560 ft)
- Lowest elevation: 0 m (0 ft)

Population (2024 census)
  - Total: 21,335
  - Density: 187.5/km^{2} (485.6/sq mi)
  - Households: 5,227

Economy
  - Income class: 3rd municipal income class
  - Poverty incidence: 33.36% (2023)
  - Revenue: ₱ 140 million (2024)
  - Assets: ₱ 236 million (2024)
  - Expenditure: ₱ 119.3 million (2024)
  - Liabilities: ₱ 73.24 million (2024)

Service provider
  - Electricity: Eastern Samar Electric Cooperative (ESAMELCO)
- Time zone: UTC+8 (PST)
- ZIP code: 6802
- PSGC: 0802619000
- IDD : area code: +63 (0)55
- Native languages: Waray; Tagalog
- Website: www.salcedo-esamar.gov.ph/,%20https://www.salcedoeasternsamar.gov.ph/

Salcedo (IPA: [ˌsɐlˈsɛdo]; Waray: Bungto han Salcedo, Tagalog: Bayan ng Salcedo), officially the Municipality of Salcedo, is a municipality in the province of Eastern Samar, Philippines. According to the 2024 census, it has a population of 21,335 people.

== History ==
The town was formerly a part of Guiuan. On December 8, 1862, Salcedo became an independent municipality part of the province of Samar by a decree of the Bishop of Cebu. It was named after Juan de Salcedo, a Spanish conquistador. On October 23, 1903, it was temporarily returned to Guiuan by virtue of Act No. 960.

During World War II the Salcedo was part of a large US Navy base Leyte-Samar Naval Base from 1944 to 1946. In 1959, the sitio of Balud was converted into a barrio. Following the 1965 Samar division plebiscite, Salcedo became part of the new province of Eastern Samar.

== Geography ==
=== Barangays ===
Salcedo is politically subdivided into 41 barangays. Each barangay consists of puroks and some have sitios.

- Abejao
- Alog
- Asgad
- Bangon
- Bagtong
- Balud
- Barangay 1 (Poblacion)
- Barangay 13 (Poblacion)
- Barangay 2 (Poblacion)
- Barangay 3 (Poblacion)
- Barangay 4 (Poblacion)
- Barangay 5 (Poblacion)
- Barangay 6 (Poblacion)
- Barangay 7 (Poblacion)
- Barangay 8 (Poblacion)
- Barangay 9 (Poblacion)
- Barangay 10 (Poblacion)
- Barangay 11 (Poblacion)
- Barangay 12 (Poblacion)
- Buabua
- Burak
- Butig
- Cagaut
- Camanga
- Cantomoja
- Carapdapan
- Caridad
- Casili-on
- Iberan
- Jagnaya
- Lusod
- Malbog
- Maliwaliw
- Matarinao
- Naparaan
- Seguinon
- San Roque (Bugay)
- Santa Cruz
- Tacla-on
- Tagbacan
- Palanas
- Talangdawan

=== Climate ===
Climate data for Salcedo, Eastern Samar
Month	Jan	Feb	Mar	Apr	May	Jun	Jul	Aug	Sep	Oct	Nov	Dec	Year
Mean daily maximum °C (°F)	28 (82)	28 (82)	29 (84)	30 (86)	30 (86)	30 (86)	29 (84)	30 (86)	30 (86)	29 (84)	29 (84)	28 (82)	29 (84)
Mean daily minimum °C (°F)	22 (72)	22 (72)	22 (72)	23 (73)	24 (75)	24 (75)	24 (75)	24 (75)	24 (75)	24 (75)	23 (73)	23 (73)	23 (74)
Average precipitation mm (inches)	90 (3.5)	67 (2.6)	82 (3.2)	70 (2.8)	97 (3.8)	145 (5.7)	152 (6.0)	127 (5.0)	132 (5.2)	152 (6.0)	169 (6.7)	144 (5.7)	1,427 (56.2)
Average rainy days	17.0	13.5	16.0	16.5	20.6	24.3	26.0	25.4	25.2	26.4	23.0	21.1	255
Source: Meteoblue

== Demographics ==
Population census of Salcedo
Year	Pop.	±% p.a.
1903	7,393	—
1918	9,106	+1.40%
1939	13,237	+1.80%
1948	15,201	+1.55%
1960	16,766	+0.82%
1970	15,077	−1.05%
1975	14,877	−0.27%
1980	16,355	+1.91%
1990	16,597	+0.15%
1995	16,026	−0.65%
2000	16,971	+1.24%
2007	18,680	+1.33%
2010	19,970	+2.46%
2015	22,532	+2.33%
2020	22,136	−0.37%
2024	21,335	−0.88%
Source: Philippine Statistics Authority

The population of Salcedo, Eastern Samar, in the 2024 census was 21,335 people, with a density of 200 inhabitants per square kilometer or 520 inhabitants per square mile.

== Economy ==
Poverty incidence of Salcedo (%)

Source: Philippine Statistics Authority

== Notable people ==
- José Lugay Raquel - member of the Philippine House of Representatives from 1916 to 1922
