= Llorente, Eastern Samar =

Municipality in Eastern Samar, Philippines

Llorente Lanang
- Municipality
- Municipality of Llorente
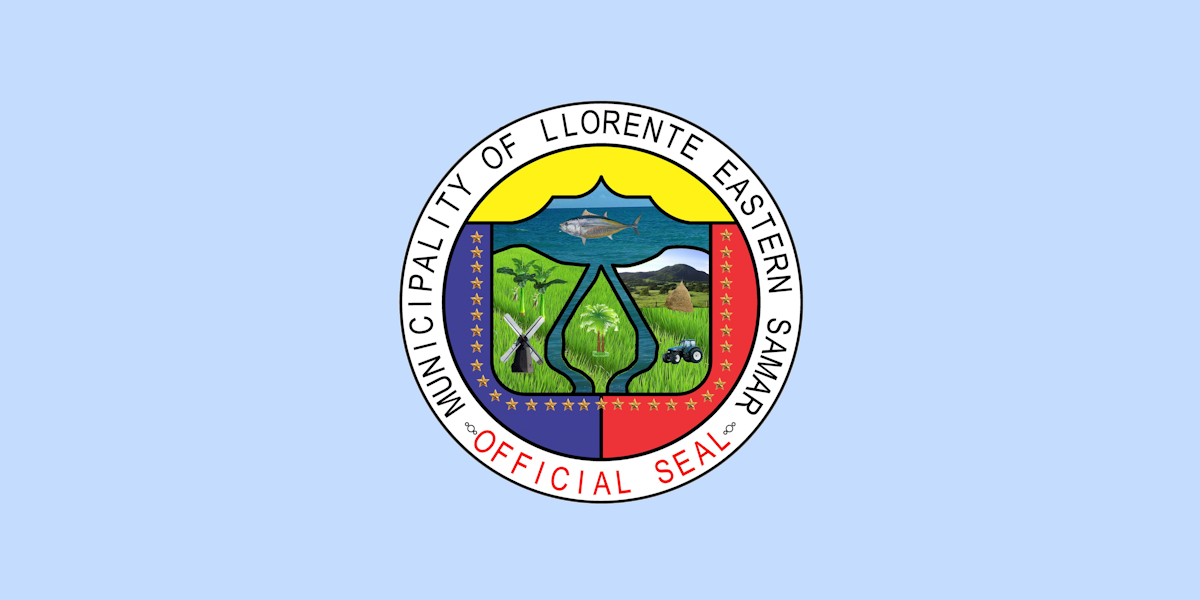
- Flag

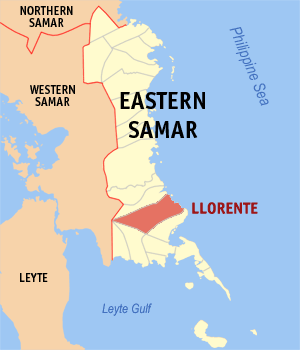
- Map of Eastern Samar with Llorente highlighted
- Interactive map of Llorente
- Location within the Philippines
- Coordinates: 11°24′45″N 125°32′45″E
- Country: Philippines
- Region: Eastern Visayas
- Province: Eastern Samar
- District: Lone district
- Named for: Julio Aballe Llorente
- Barangays: 33 (see Barangays)

Government
  - Type: Sangguniang Bayan
  - Mayor: Daniel C. Boco
  - Vice Mayor: Jonnie A. Condrada
  - Representative: Maria Fe R. Abunda
  - Councilors: List: • Nathaniel A. Hugo; • Joselito G. Alzate; • Zacarias Nick Y. Banog; • Nestor A. Altar; • Eugenio B. Bonga; • Ma. Emma S. Guarino; • Antonio C. Bormate; • Leopoldo G. Aguilar; DILG Masterlist of Officials
  - Electorate: 14,419 voters (2025)

Area
  - Total: 496.07 km^{2} (191.53 sq mi)
- Elevation: 21 m (69 ft)
- Highest elevation: 181 m (594 ft)
- Lowest elevation: 0 m (0 ft)

Population (2024 census)
  - Total: 18,909
  - Density: 38.118/km^{2} (98.724/sq mi)
  - Households: 5,333

Economy
  - Income class: 1st municipal income class
  - Poverty incidence: 36.63% (2023)
  - Revenue: ₱ 230.9 million (2024)
  - Assets: ₱ 725.3 million (2024)
  - Expenditure: ₱ 168 million (2024)
  - Liabilities: ₱ 98.36 million (2024)

Service provider
  - Electricity: Eastern Samar Electric Cooperative (ESAMELCO)
- Time zone: UTC+8 (PST)
- ZIP code: 6803
- PSGC: 0802613000
- IDD : area code: +63 (0)55
- Native languages: Waray; Tagalog
- Website: www.llorente-esamar.gov.ph

Llorente (IPA: [ˌʎoˈrɛntɛ]), officially the Municipality of Llorente (Waray: Bungto han Llorente; Tagalog: Bayan ng Llorente), is a municipality in the province of Eastern Samar, Philippines. According to the 2024 census, it has a population of 18,909 people.

The municipality was named after Julio Aballe Llorente (1863–1940), a Cebuano Politician who was instrumental in the establishment of the American Government in Cebu. He was the 1st Governor of Cebu, who once became a Governor of Samar in the early 1900s.

== Geography ==
=== Barangays ===
Llorente is politically subdivided into 33 barangays. Each barangay consists of puroks and some have sitios.

- Antipolo
- Babanikhon
- Bacayawan
- Barobo
- Burak
- Can-ato
- Candoros
- Canliwag
- Cantomco
- Hugpa
- Maca-anga
- Magtino
- Mina-anod
- Naubay
- Piliw
- Barangay 1 (Poblacion)
- Barangay 2 (Poblacion)
- Barangay 3 (Poblacion)
- Barangay 4 (Poblacion)
- Barangay 5 (Poblacion)
- Barangay 6 (Poblacion)
- Barangay 7 (Poblacion)
- Barangay 8 (Poblacion)
- Barangay 9 (Poblacion)
- Barangay 10 (Poblacion)
- Barangay 11 (Poblacion)
- Barangay 12 (Poblacion)
- San Jose
- San Miguel
- San Roque
- So-ong
- Tabok
- Waso

=== Climate ===
Climate data for Llorente, Eastern Samar
Month	Jan	Feb	Mar	Apr	May	Jun	Jul	Aug	Sep	Oct	Nov	Dec	Year
Mean daily maximum °C (°F)	28 (82)	28 (82)	29 (84)	30 (86)	30 (86)	30 (86)	29 (84)	30 (86)	30 (86)	29 (84)	29 (84)	28 (82)	29 (84)
Mean daily minimum °C (°F)	22 (72)	22 (72)	22 (72)	23 (73)	24 (75)	24 (75)	24 (75)	24 (75)	24 (75)	24 (75)	23 (73)	23 (73)	23 (74)
Average precipitation mm (inches)	90 (3.5)	67 (2.6)	82 (3.2)	70 (2.8)	97 (3.8)	145 (5.7)	152 (6.0)	127 (5.0)	132 (5.2)	152 (6.0)	169 (6.7)	144 (5.7)	1,427 (56.2)
Average rainy days	17.0	13.5	16.0	16.5	20.6	24.3	26.0	25.4	25.2	26.4	23.0	21.1	255
Source: Meteoblue

== Demographics ==
Population census of Llorente
Year	Pop.	±% p.a.
1903	5,731	—
1918	8,270	+2.48%
1939	11,570	+1.61%
1948	13,955	+2.10%
1960	13,958	+0.00%
1970	16,291	+1.56%
1975	15,639	−0.82%
1980	19,091	+4.07%
1990	18,278	−0.43%
1995	16,071	−2.38%
2000	19,336	+4.04%
2007	18,257	−0.79%
2010	19,101	+1.66%
2015	20,149	+1.02%
2020	21,459	+1.33%
2024	18,909	−2.99%
Source: Philippine Statistics Authority

The population of Llorente in the 2024 census was 18,909 people, with a density of 38 inhabitants per square kilometre or 98 inhabitants per square mile.

== Economy ==
Poverty incidence of Llorente (%)

Source: Philippine Statistics Authority

== Notable people ==
- Lutgardo Barbo, Former governor of Eastern Samar, Candidate for the 2022 Senate Elections.
