= San Julian, Eastern Samar =

Municipality in Eastern Samar, Philippines

San Julian
- Municipality
- Municipality of San Julian
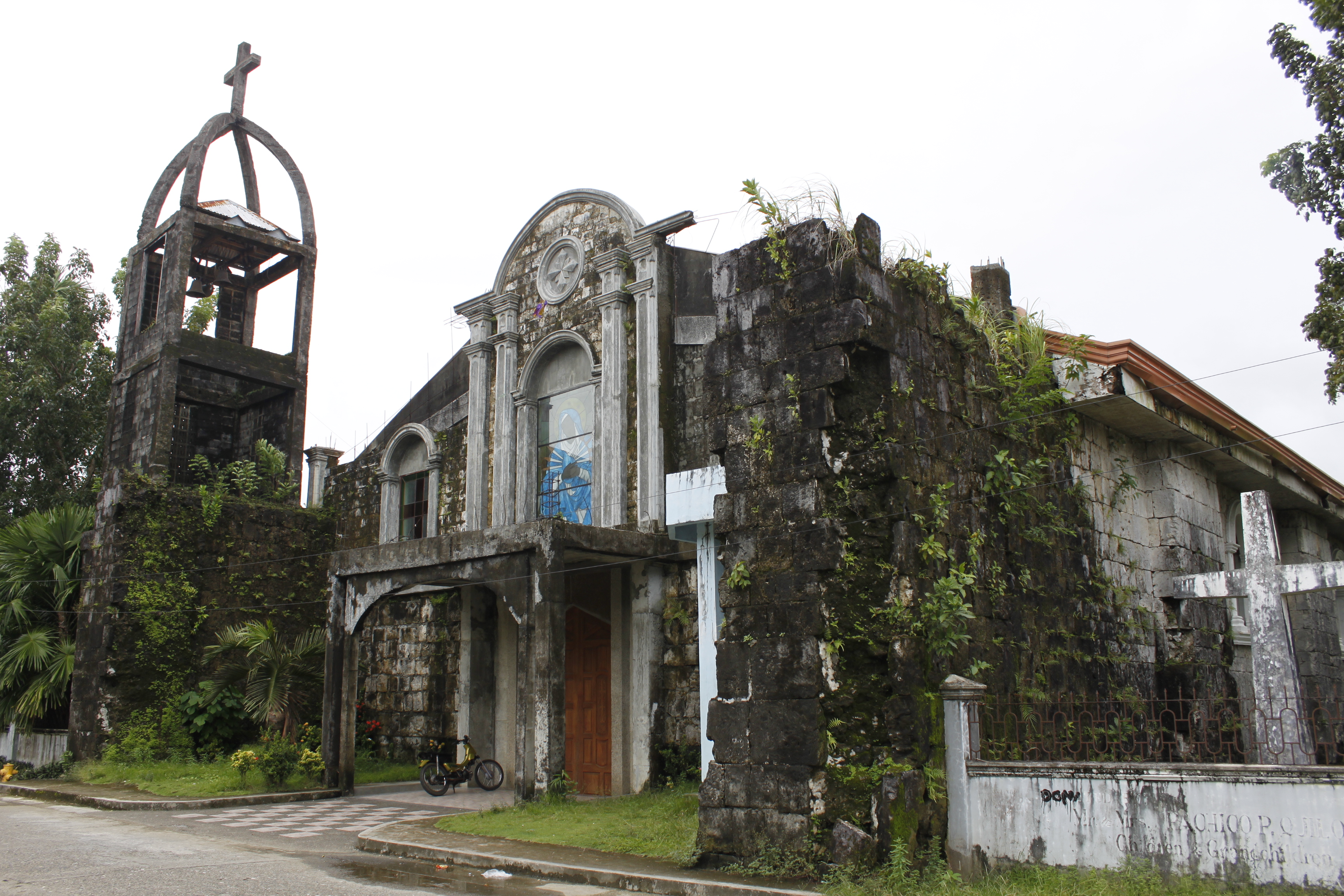
- Church of San Julian
- Motto: "For the love of San Julian"
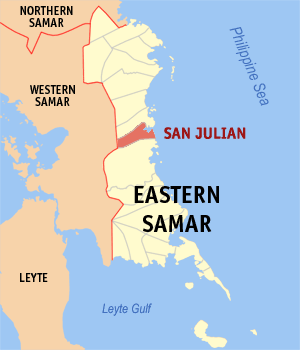
- Map of Eastern Samar with San Julian highlighted
- Interactive map of San Julian
- Location within the Philippines
- Coordinates: 11°45′13″N 125°27′21″E
- Country: Philippines
- Region: Eastern Visayas
- Province: Eastern Samar
- District: Lone district
- Barangays: 16 (see Barangays)

Government
  - Type: Sangguniang Bayan
  - Mayor: Dorie Jorgie O. Estaron
  - Vice Mayor: Dennis P. Estaron
  - Representative: Christopher Sheen P. Gonzales
  - Councilors: List: • Marlon Madolid; • Bernadette Aseo; • Portia Anacta; • Robiene Yeying; • Abelardo Campani; • Jhe Quintua; • Dorothy Artugue; • Fermin Cidro; DILG Masterlist of Officials
  - Electorate: 10,852 voters (2025)

Area
  - Total: 150.62 km^{2} (58.15 sq mi)
- Elevation: 15 m (49 ft)
- Highest elevation: 205 m (673 ft)
- Lowest elevation: 0 m (0 ft)

Population (2024 census)
  - Total: 14,509
  - Density: 96.329/km^{2} (249.49/sq mi)
  - Households: 3,736
- Demonym: San Juliananon

Economy
  - Income class: 4th municipal income class
  - Poverty incidence: 31.9% (2023)
  - Revenue: ₱ 149.8 million (2024)
  - Assets: ₱ 270.5 million (2024)
  - Expenditure: ₱ 141.3 million (2024)
  - Liabilities: ₱ 69.5 million (2020), 39.62 million (2024)

Service provider
  - Electricity: Eastern Samar Electric Cooperative (ESAMELCO)
- Time zone: UTC+8 (PST)
- ZIP code: 6814
- PSGC: 0802620000
- IDD : area code: +63 (0)55
- Native languages: Waray; Tagalog
- Website: www.sanjulian-esamar.gov.ph

San Julian, officially the Municipality of San Julian (Waray: Bungto han San Julian; Tagalog: Bayan ng San Julian), is a municipality in the province of Eastern Samar, Philippines. According to the 2024 census, it has a population of 14,509 people.

== Geography ==
=== Barangays ===
San Julian is politically subdivided into 16 barangays. Each barangay consists of puroks and some have sitios.

- Bunacan
- Campidhan
- Casoroy
- Libas
- Lunang
- Nena (Luna)
- Pagbabangnan
- Barangay No. 1 Poblacion
- Barangay No. 2 Poblacion
- Barangay No. 3 Poblacion
- Barangay No. 4 Poblacion
- Barangay No. 5 Poblacion
- Barangay No. 6 Poblacion
- Putong
- San Isidro
- San Miguel

=== Climate ===
Climate data for San Julian, Eastern Samar
Month	Jan	Feb	Mar	Apr	May	Jun	Jul	Aug	Sep	Oct	Nov	Dec	Year
Mean daily maximum °C (°F)	27 (81)	28 (82)	28 (82)	30 (86)	30 (86)	30 (86)	29 (84)	29 (84)	29 (84)	29 (84)	28 (82)	28 (82)	29 (84)
Mean daily minimum °C (°F)	22 (72)	22 (72)	22 (72)	23 (73)	24 (75)	24 (75)	24 (75)	24 (75)	24 (75)	24 (75)	23 (73)	23 (73)	23 (74)
Average precipitation mm (inches)	114 (4.5)	81 (3.2)	94 (3.7)	81 (3.2)	119 (4.7)	192 (7.6)	186 (7.3)	158 (6.2)	167 (6.6)	185 (7.3)	202 (8.0)	176 (6.9)	1,755 (69.2)
Average rainy days	18.6	14.7	16.8	17.8	22.3	25.9	27.5	26.2	26.6	27.0	24.6	22.3	270.3
Source: Meteoblue

== Demographics ==
Population census of San Julian
Year	Pop.	±% p.a.
1903	3,765	—
1918	5,364	+2.39%
1939	5,880	+0.44%
1948	6,735	+1.52%
1960	7,806	+1.24%
1970	10,237	+2.74%
1975	10,965	+1.39%
1980	13,007	+3.47%
1990	11,469	−1.25%
1995	11,858	+0.63%
2000	12,383	+0.93%
2007	13,164	+0.85%
2010	13,748	+1.59%
2015	14,498	+1.02%
2020	14,800	+0.43%
2024	14,509	−0.48%
Source: Philippine Statistics Authority

The population of San Julian, Eastern Samar, in the 2024 census was 14,509 people, with a density of 96 inhabitants per square kilometre or 250 inhabitants per square mile.

== Economy ==
Poverty incidence of San Julian (%)

Source: Philippine Statistics Authority
