= Hebacong Sea of Clouds and Nature Park =

Park in the Philippines

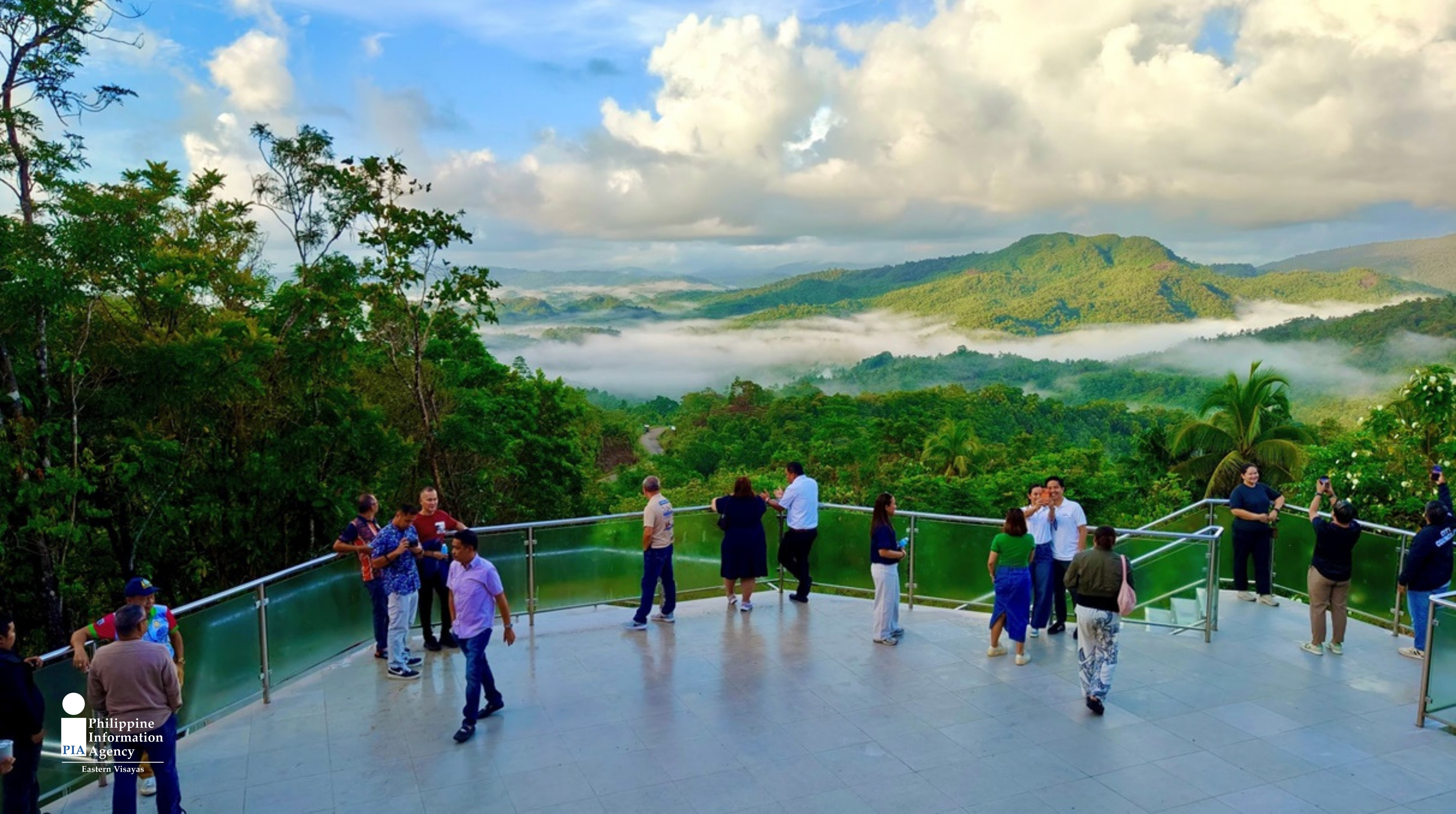
- Hebacong Sea of Clouds view deck. April 2026.

- Location within Visayas Location within Philippines
- Type: Ecotourism park
- Location: Borongan, Eastern Samar, Philippines
- Coordinates: 11.500478°N 125.401584°E
- Opened: March 2023

The Hebacong Sea of Clouds and Nature Park is an eco-tourism park located in Borongan, Eastern Samar, Philippines. The park has a natural sea of clouds phenomenon with other amenities such as a level viewing deck, café, and parking area.

== History ==
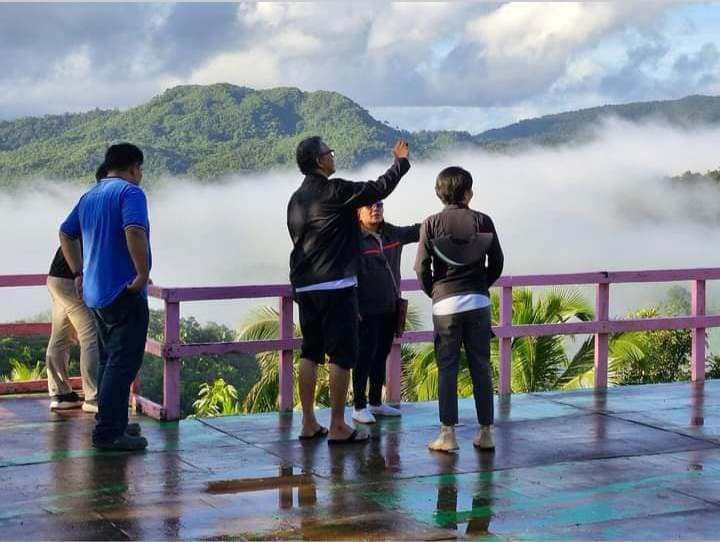
The old Hebacong Sea of Clouds viewing deck with visiting officials. January 2024.

The site of the Hebacong Sea of Clouds used to be a conflict-zone and was an area that can only be reached via boat prior to the construction of an access road to Borongan city proper.

The Hebacong Sea of Clouds in Barangay Hebacong in Borongan, Eastern Samar was first developed and opened in March 2023. The park however began undergoing renovations funded by the Tourism Infrastructure and Enterprise Zone Authority (TIEZA) worth ₱17 million. Former New People's Army members were provided opportunities to be tour guides of the park through training by the city government.

On April 28, 2026, the park had a soft launch and blessing ceremony led by Mayor Dayan Agda. On May 1, the Hebacong Sea of Clouds Nature Park officially reopened.

== Features ==
The Hebacong Sea of Clouds covers an area of 8,177 square meters (88,020 square feet). It is situated on an upland area. Its mountainous terrain is often blanketed by clouds at the base during dawn giving a sea of clouds phenomenon. It has a three-level viewing deck, café, and a parking area.

It is also a learning site, with the Borongan city government partnering with the Eastern Samar State University with plans to add monitoring systems for climate change research in the park.

== See also ==
- Baybay Boulevard
- Ando Island
