= Art Ramasasa =

- Born: Arturo Pajarilla Ramasasa; Borongan, Eastern Samar, Philippines
- Genres: folk, curacha (kuratsa), la jota, amenudo, waray-waray songs
- Occupations: singer, songwriter, musician
- Instruments: guitar, organ
- Label: Aquarius Records

Arturo Pajarilla Ramasasa, better known as Art Ramasasa, is a musician who performs in the Waray-Waray language. He has been given the moniker Blind Master of Waray Song, in reference to his blindness and his different roles in the music industry as composer, lyricist, arranger, guitarist, organist, and vocalist or singer. He is said to have started his career as composer-singer at the age of 18, recording for the music label Aquarius Records. Like his fellow Waray musician Joseph Uy, he has also recorded music, much of which is composed of his own versions of traditional dances in Eastern Visayas such as the kuratsa, jota, and aminudo. Unlike Joseph Uy's style which is said to be serious, Art Ramasasa employs humor in his musical style, which has led some like writer Doms Pagliawan to compare him to Yoyoy Villame and Max Surban.

== Discography ==
=== Songs ===
- An Giporlosanon
- Ikaw la an higugma-on ko
- Man Tomas
- Never Been Touched, Never Been Kissed (Mahamis an Iya Kutis)
- Lajuta Segunda
- Hi Ana (sung to the tune of Neil Sedaka's Oh Carol)
- Mano Joe ug Iday Leleng
- Kuratsa Mayor
- Ismayling
