= Rupert Ambil =

Filipino journalist

Head, Borongan City Information Office
- Incumbent
- Assumed office March 2022

Personal details
- Born: Ruperto Langomes Ambil II; 27 March 1975 (age 51) Borongan, Eastern Samar, Philippines
- Spouse: Maria Cecilia Mercado-Ambil
- Education: University of the Philippines Los Baños and Diliman
- Occupation: Journalist

Ruperto Langomes Ambil II (born March 27, 1975), commonly known as Rupert Ambil, is a Filipino journalist.

== Early life and education ==
Ambil was on March 27, 1965 in Borongan, Eastern Samar to Ruperto Ambil Jr. and Anna Dilao Langomes. His father served as the 4th Governor of Eastern Samar from 1998 to 2001.

He finished his secondary studies at University of the Philippines Integrated School (UPIS) in 1992 and pursued journalism degree at University of the Philippines Los Baños and Diliman. He is a member of the Beta Sigma fraternity.

== Career ==
=== Journalism ===
In 1997, he began his career in the broadcast industry as a field producer at ABS-CBN News Channel. In 2000, he left what his work for an NGO in Eastern Samar until 2005 when he returned to ABS-CBN. From 2005 to 2008, he became the Future Desk Specialist and in 2008, he was appointed the Head of Field Operations at the News & Current Affairs Division until 2011.

In 2011, he joined Rappler and was its Head of Systems and Operations until 2018, collaborating closely with its founder and 2021 Nobel Peace Prize laureate Maria Ressa. During his tenure, he was also the Executive Director of Rappler's Move.PH, a civic engagement arm that connects online and onground communities in taking action on issues that matter to them through digitally-fueled campaigns, insightful stories, and intelligent conversations.

=== Work in Borongan ===
In 2019, Ambil became the chairperson of the annual "Surf in the City" Festival in his hometown. In 2022, he was appointed as the Head at Borongan City Information Office, which include roles as the city's flight operations chair and tourism officer-in-charge.
