= Beta Sigma =

Filipino collegiate fraternity

- βΣ
- Founded: July 14, 1946; 80 years ago University of the Philippines Manila
- Type: Traditional
- Affiliation: Independent
- Status: Active
- Emphasis: Social
- Scope: Philippines
- Pillars: Brotherhood, Integrity, Loyalty, Equality and Service
- Chapters: 195
- Members: 20,000+ lifetime
- Nickname: Beta Sigman, Betan
- Headquarters: Philippines
- Website: betasigman.com

Beta Sigma (βΣ) is a collegiate fraternity based in the Philippines. It was founded in 1946 at the University of the Philippines in Manila. It is one of the largest fraternities in the Philippines.

== History ==
Beta Sigma was founded on July 14, 1946, at the University of the Philippines Manila. Organized by Jesus R. Jayme and Nicanor P. Jacinto Jr., it was the first fraternity established in the Philippines after World War II. The fraternity's mission is "to uphold all that is good and noble in man and foster brotherhood, excellence, tradition, achievement, and nationalism".

On August 13, 1950, a second chapter was chartered at the University of the Philippines Los Baños. After adding more chapters, the fraternity was incorporated as Beta Sigma Fraternity Philippines (BetaPhil), a national organization, in 1975. The fraternity's alumni association was also created in 1975. It now has alumni associations locally in the Philippines and internationally, operating as UP Beta Sigma Fraternity International.

Beta Sigma has chartered more than 100 chapters at colleges and universities in the Philippines, with 95 active chapters in 2015. In 2012, it had 15,000 active members in the Philippines. Its sister sorority is Sigma Beta. There is also has a Beta Sigma Ladies Corps.

As of 2024, Beta Sigma has 195 chapters worldwide and 20,000 members. It is one of the largest fraternities in the country.

== Symbols and traditions ==
The Greek letters of the fraternity's name, Beta Sigma, stand for Brotherhood of Scholars. The fraternity has adopted the Beta Sigma Credo, the "Betan Hymn", and its 9 Principal Truths. Its pillars are Brotherhood, Integrity, Loyalty, Equality and Service. Its members are called Betans. Its motto is "All That Is Good And Noble In Man!"

Malmon is used as the mascot of Beta Sigma.

Beta Sigma refers to its officers as:

- Grand Princep (president)
- Vice-Grand Princep (vice president)
- Master of the Rolls (secretary)
- Guardian of the Coffers (treasurer)
- Chamberlain (auditor)
- Herald (public relations officer)
- Wielders of the Sword (sergeant at arms)

== Activities ==
Beta Sigma's members participate in service and charitable activities, such as blood drives, medical and dental missions, building houses, and the distribution of relief packets and food for those in need. For its 66th anniversary, the fraternity organized the National Greening Program, overseeing the planting 1.5 billion trees nationwide over six years. It also organizes conventions, fraternity balls, and international homecoming celebrations for its members.

== Chapters ==
Following is an incomplete list of Beta Sigma chapters.

Chapter	Charter Date	Institution	Location	Status	Ref.
Mother Chapter	July 14, 1946	University of the Philippines Manila	Manila, Philippines		
UP Los Baños (Beta)	August 13, 1950	University of the Philippines Los Baños	Laguna, Philippines	Active	
	1956	Far Eastern University–Narciso Reyes Medical Foundation	Manila, Philippines		
	before 1957	Gregorio Araneta University Foundation	Malabon, Philippines		
	before 1975	Manila Central University	Caloocan, Philippines		
	1960	University of the East Ramon Magsaysay	Quezon City, Philippines	Active	
	before 1975	Silliman University	Dumaguete, Philippines		
Iloilo	August 27, 1989	University of the Philippines	Miag-ao, Iloilo, Philippines	Active	
Iloilo	November 28, 1981	Central Philippine University	Jaro, Iloilo, Philippines	Active	
Western USA	October 1990		United States		
Nueva Ecija Colleges	October 24, 1991		Cabanatuan, Nueva Ecija, Philippines	Active	
San Diego	May 15, 1993		San Diego, California	Active	
Melbourne	July 17, 1999		Melbourne, Australia	Active	
Northwest USA	August 19, 2001		Seattle, Washington, United States	Active	
MCC Beta Sigma Fraternity	March 27, 2011	Mabalacat College	Mabalacat City, Philippines	Active	
Baguio			Baguio, Philippines	Active	
Beta Sigma Fraternity Alumni Association			Australia, Canada, and United States	Active	
Beta Sigma Fraternity Alumni Association in Qatar			Qatar	Active	
Beta Sigma Alumni Association of Texas			Texas, United States	Active	
Beta Sigma Fraternity Alumni Association UAE			United Arab Emirates	Active	
Canada			Canada		
Central			Philippines	Active	
Makati			Makati, Philippines	Active	
Mindanao			Mindanao, Philippines	Active	
New York			New York City, New York	Active	
Northern California			California, United States	Active	
OBBF			Philippines	Active	
Saudi Arabia			Saudi Arabia	Active	
Sorsogon		Sorsogon State University	Sorsogon, Philippines	Active	
Southern California			California, United States	Active	
Southern Mindanao		University of Southern Mindanao	Cotabato, Philippines	Active	
TSU		Tarlac State University	Tarlac, Philippines	Active	
		Manuel S. Enverga University Foundation			

== Notable Members ==
- José Abueva, president of the University of the Philippines
- Proceso Alcala, former secretary of Department of Agriculture, former Philippines Congressman, politician, and engineer
- Rupert Ambil, former Rappler and ABS-CBN journalist
- Antonio Bautista, Philippine Air Force commander
- Camilo Cascolan, 24th Chief of the Philippine National Police (PNP)
- Matias Defensor Jr., Philippine politician
- Voltaire Gazmin, former secretary of Department of National Defense of the Philippines
- Horacio Morales, Philippine Secretary of Agrarian Reform
- Willie Nepomuceno, comedian and impersonator
- Ramón Paje, Secretary of the Department of Environment and Natural Resources
- Vic Valdepenas, president of UnionBank (Philippines)
- Randy Malayao, slain consultant of the National Democratic Front of the Philippines

== See also ==
- List of fraternities and sororities in the Philippines
