= Eastern Samar State University =

Public university in Eastern Samar, Philippines

- Pamantasang Pampamahalaan ng Silangang Samar (Filipino)
- Former names: Eastern Samar National Regional Agricultural School (1960–1973); Eastern Samar Junior Agricultural College (1973–1978); Eastern Samar College of Agriculture (1978–1993); Eastern Samar State College (1993–2004)
- Type: Public Provincial state university system Co-educational Non-profit Research higher education institution
- Established: 1960
- President: Dr. Andres C. Pagatpatan, Jr.
- Vice-president: Dr. Vicente A. Agda, Jr. (VP for Academic Affairs); Dr. Jocelyn S. Castro (VP for Quality Assurance & Accreditation); Dr. Rhodora C. Mendoza (VP for Administrative Services); Dr. Aris A. Lapada (VP for Research & Extension)
- Location: Brgy. Maypangdan, Borongan, Eastern Samar, Philippines; 11°39′35″N 125°26′32″E
- Campus: Borongan (Main Campus); Can-avid Campus; Guiuan Campus; Maydolong Campus; Salcedo Campus; Arteche (Extension Campus); Balangiga (Extension Campus)
- Website: www.essu.edu.ph
- Location in the Visayas Location in the Philippines

Eastern Samar State University is a state university in the Philippines with main campus located in Borongan, Eastern Samar. It has a satellite campus in Salcedo, Maydolong, Guiuan, Can-avid, Arteche (External Campus), and Balangiga (External Campus).

== History ==
Founded On February 14, 1960, as the Eastern Samar National Regional Agricultural School (ESNRAS) through R.A. 2434. Some 120 Students held sessions in a rented building in Borongan. The school was later established in Malbog, far-flung barrio of Borongan, reach only by climbing steep mountains and by crossing creeks.

In 1967, the school was resettled to its present location between the barangays of Tabunan and Maypangdan, some seven kilometers away from the provincial capital city of Borongan.

The school was converted into the Eastern Samar Junior Agricultural College (ESJAC) in 1973 to meet the clamor for the offering of the collegiate courses. ESJAC promptly opened the program, Associate in Agriculture and later Bachelor of Science in agriculture (BSA) when it became Eastern Samar College of Agriculture (ESCA) in 1978.

ESCA was converted into the Eastern Samar State College (ESSC) by virtue of B.P 394 on May 18, 1993. This conversion eventually paved the way to rapid expansion in program offerings with courses in teacher education, vocational post-secondary education, business and commerce, engineering and law.

Republic Act 8291, enacted on June 6, 1997, mandated the CHED Supervised Higher Education Institutions of a province to integrate into a State College or a university (SUC) System. The following educational institutions Felipe Abrigo National memorial College of arts and Trade in Guiuan, Eastern Samar, Southern Samar College of Agriculture, Science and Technology in Salcedo, Eastern Samar and Can-avid National and Agriculture College in Can-avid, Eastern Samar were integrated into an educational system named Eastern Samar State College.

On August 7, 2004, R.A. 9312 was signed into law by President Gloria Macapagal Arroyo, converting ESSC into a university call Eastern Samar State University, which furthermore integrated the Maydolong National Agricultural School into the new university. Congressman Marcelino Libanan introduced the conversion bill in 2003 during the 12th congress, and Senator Francis N. Pangilinan sponsored it in the Senate.

== Satellite campuses ==
- Eastern Samar State University - Salcedo, Eastern Samar
- Eastern Samar State University - Can-Avid, Eastern Samar
- Eastern Samar State University (formerly Felipe Abrigo National Memorial College of Arts and Trades) - Guiuan, Eastern Samar
- Eastern Samar State University - Maydolong, Eastern Samar
- Eastern Samar State University - Arteche, Eastern Samar
- Eastern Samar State University - Balangiga, Eastern Samar
