= Borongan Cathedral =

Roman Catholic church in Eastern Samar, Philippines

- Cathedral Parish of the Nativity of Our Lady
- Parokya-Katedral han Matawo han Birhen Maria (Waray); Parroquia Catedral del Nacimiento de la Vírgen María (Spanish)
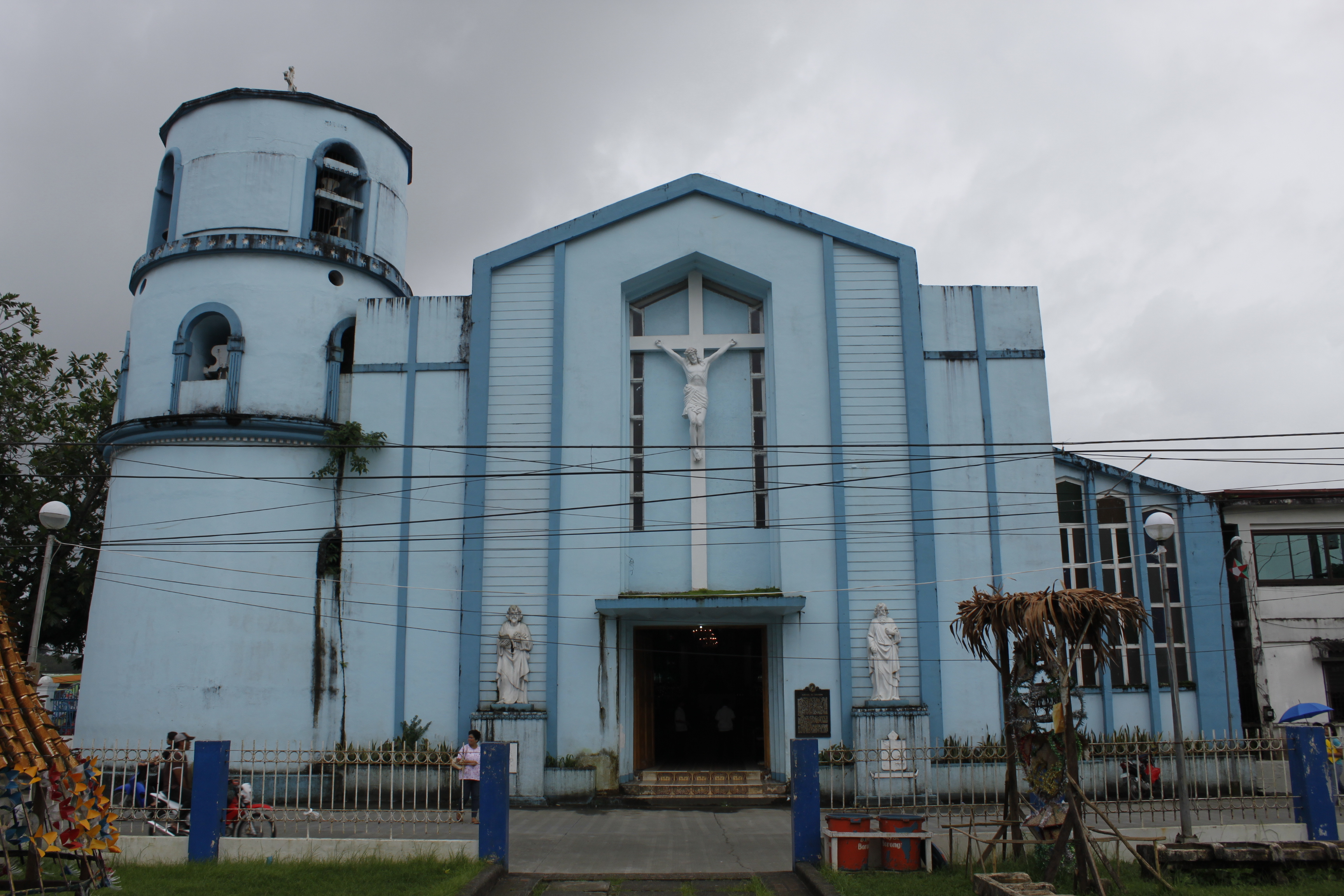
- Cathedral facade in 2012

- Location in the Visayas Location in the Philippines
- 11°36′26″N 125°25′57″E
- Location: Borongan, Eastern Samar
- Country: Philippines
- Denomination: Roman Catholic

History
- Status: Cathedral
- Founded: 1710
- Dedication: Nativity of Our Lady
- Consecrated: 1710

Architecture
- Functional status: Active
- Architectural type: Church building
- Style: Baroque
- Completed: 1710, 1781, 1853, 1873, 1887, 1950, 1962
- Demolished: 1773

Administration
- Archdiocese: Palo
- Diocese: Borongan

Clergy
- Bishop: Crispin Barrete Varquez

The Cathedral Parish of the Nativity of Our Lady, commonly known as Borongan Cathedral, is a Roman Catholic cathedral in the city of Borongan, Eastern Samar, Philippines. It is the seat of the Diocese of Borongan.

== History ==
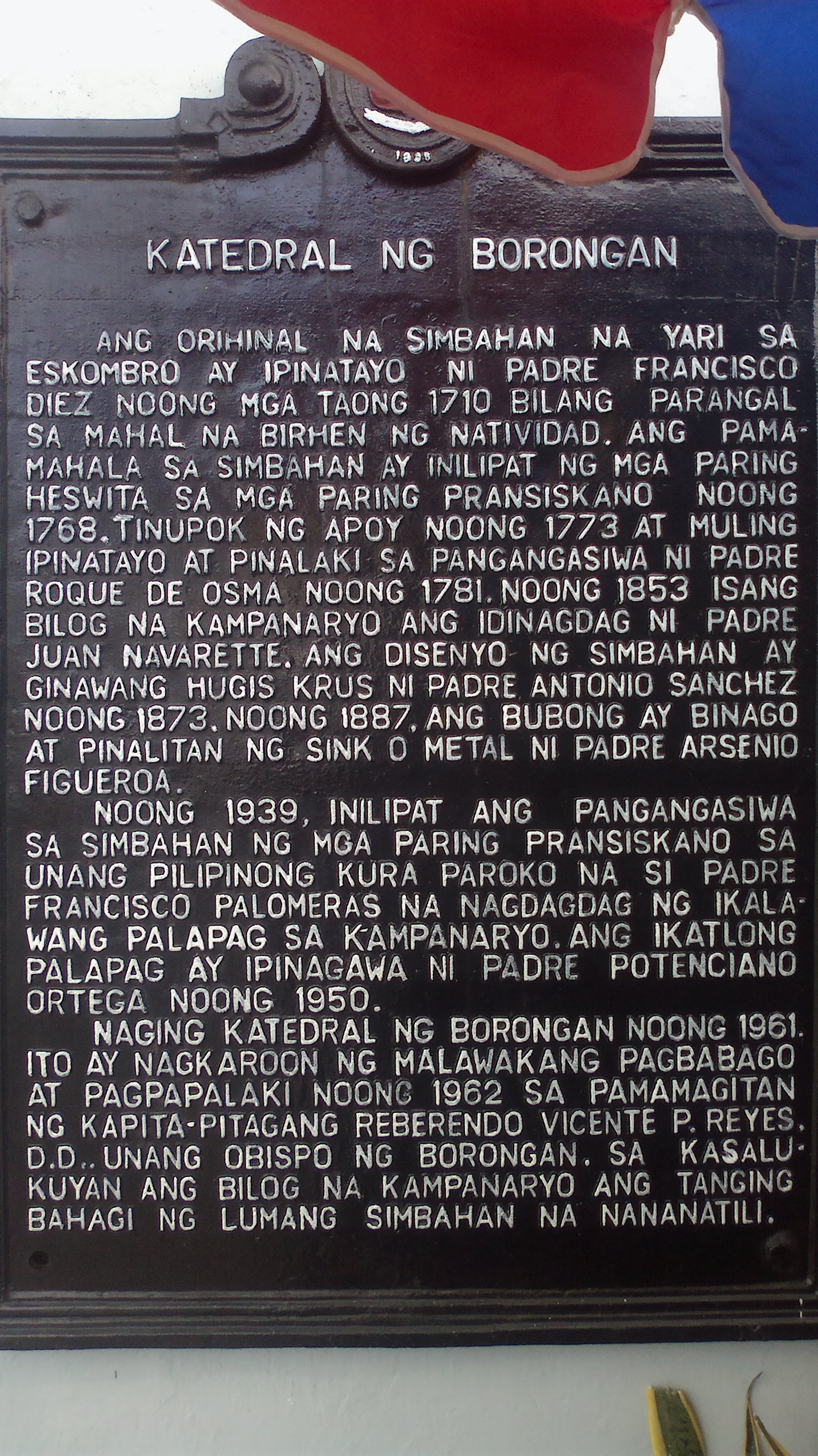
Cathedral NHI historical marker installed in 1998

Father Francisco Diez built the original church in 1710 in honor of the Blessed Virgin of Nativity. Franciscan priests transferred the church administration in 1768 to the Jesuits. In 1773, it was consumed by fire. It was rebuilt and enlarged under the direction of Father Roque de Osma in 1781. A round bell tower was added in 1853 by Father Juan Navarette. The design of the church was made in the shape of a cross by Father Antonio Sanchez in 1873. In 1887, Father Arsenio Figueroa changed the roof and was replaced with a sink or metal. In 1939, Franciscan priests transferred the administration of the church to its first Filipino parish priest, Father Francisco Palomeras, who added a second floor to the bell tower. In 1950, the third floor was built by Padre Potenciano Ortega.

In 1961, it became the seat and the cathedral of the Borongan Diocese. In 1962, it underwent a major transformation and expansion by the Reverend Vicente P. Reyes, D.D., the first bishop of Borongan. The only part of the old church that remains until today is the circular bell tower. In 1998, the NHI installed the historical marker of the cathedral.

== Gallery ==
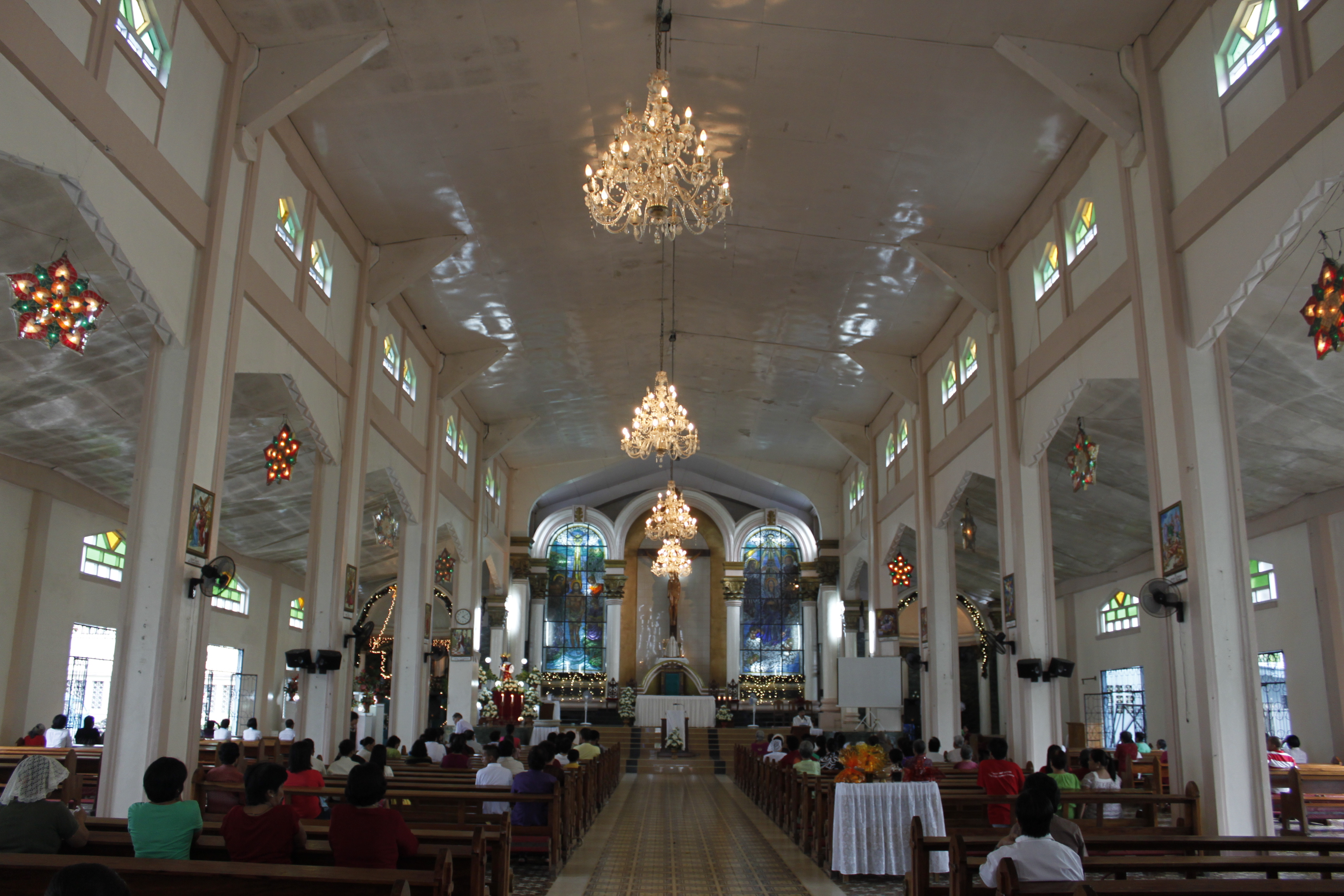
Cathedral interior in 2012

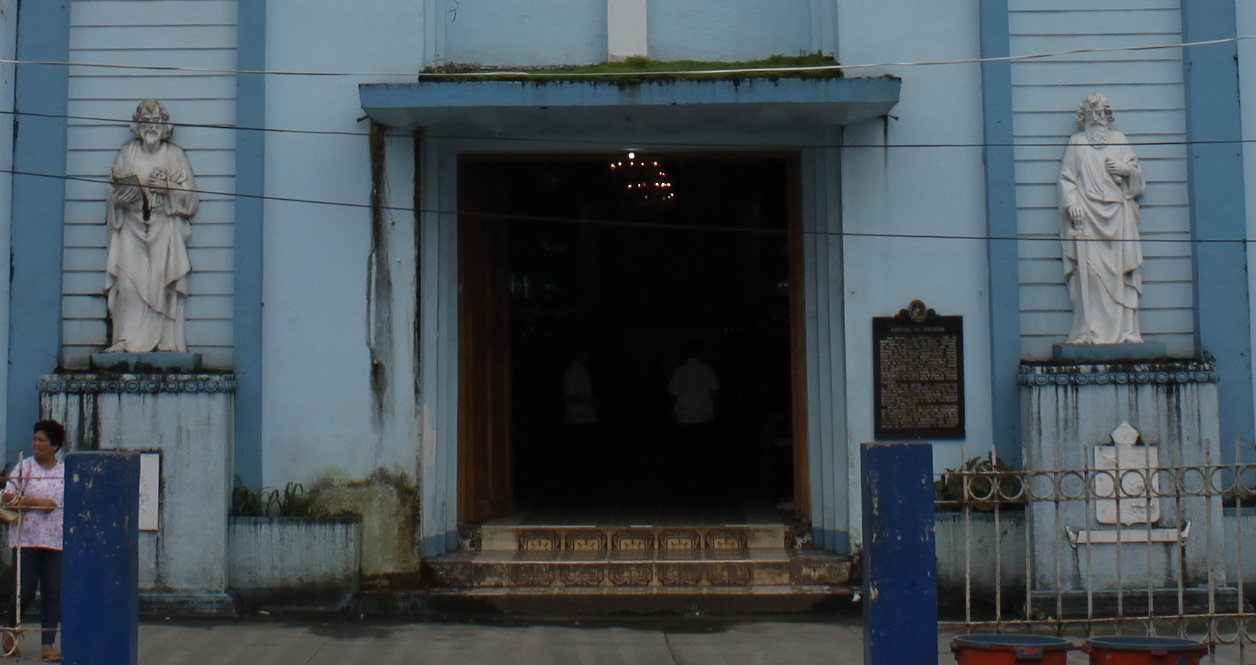
Cathedral entrance
