= Sea of clouds =

Description of layer of clouds as viewed from above, resembling waves

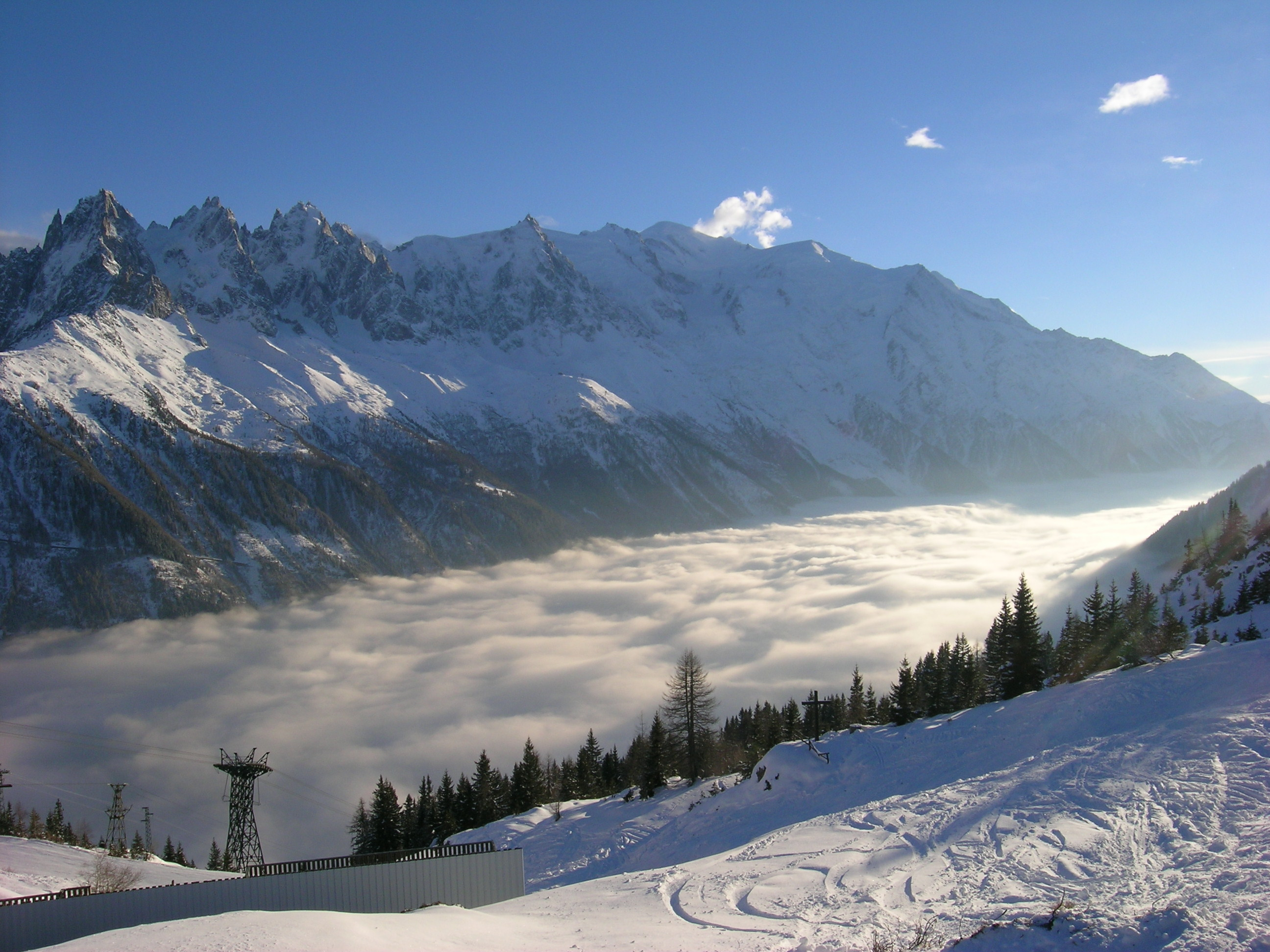
- Sea of clouds in Chamonix-Mont-Blanc.
- Classification: Family C (Low-level)
- Appearance: Uniform with ondulations
- Precipitation: no

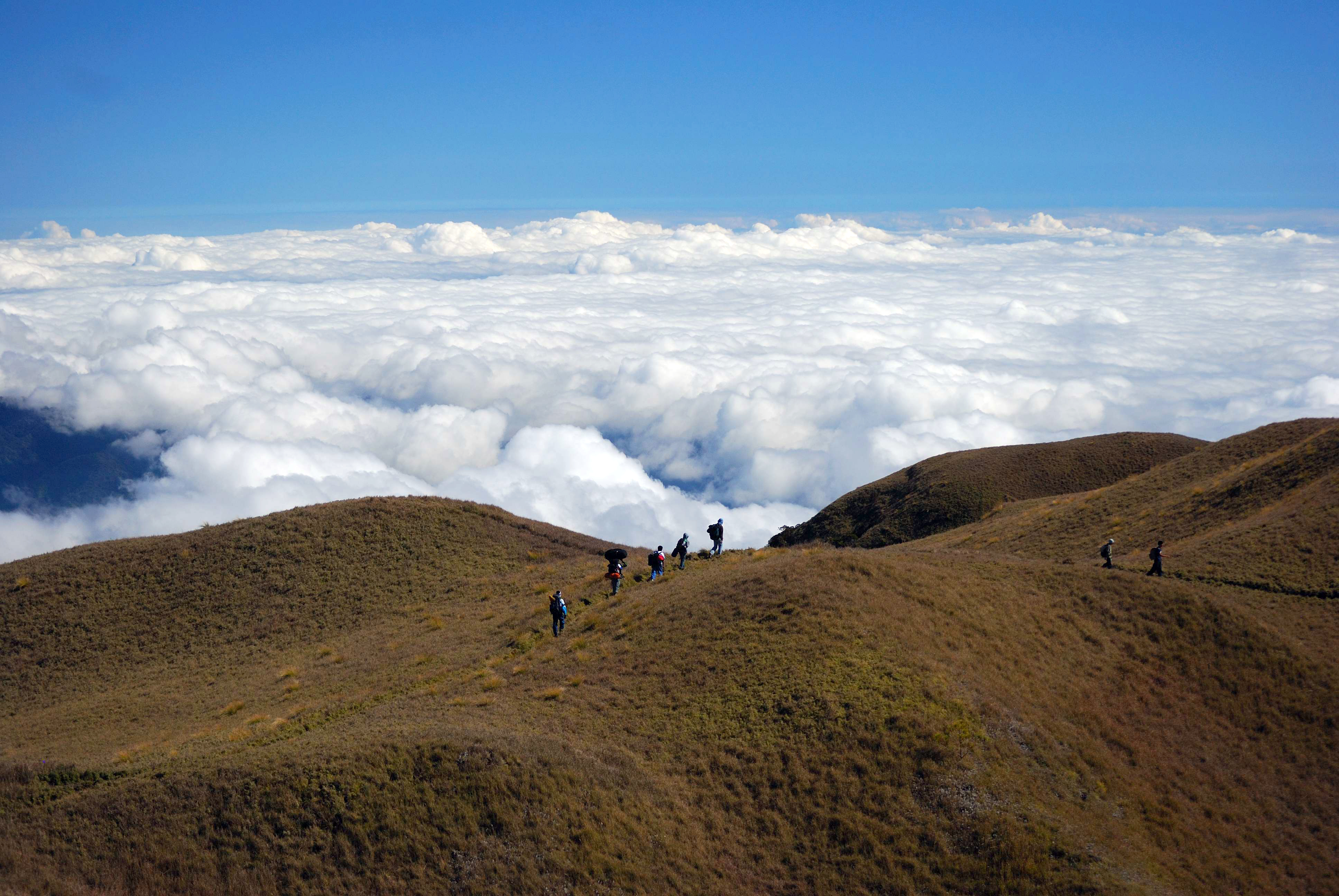
Sea of clouds in Mount Pulag, Philippines

A sea of clouds is an overcast layer of stratocumulus clouds, as viewed from above, with a relatively uniform top which shows undulations of very different lengths resembling waves on the sea. A sea of fog is formed from stratus clouds or fog and does not show undulations.

In both cases, the phenomenon looks very similar to the open ocean. The comparison is even more complete if some mountain peaks rise above the clouds, thus resembling islands.

== Formation ==
Ještěd rising above a sea of fog during a temperature inversion over the Liberec region, Czech Republic (November 2026)

A sea of clouds forms generally in valleys or over seas in very stable air mass conditions such as in a temperature inversion. Humidity can then reach saturation and condensation leads to a very uniform stratocumulus cloud, stratus cloud or fog. Above this layer, the air must be dry. This is a common situation in a high-pressure area with cooling at the surface by radiative cooling at night in summer, or advection of cold air in winter or in a marine layer.

== Artistic uses ==
- The term Sea of Clouds (雲海) is a Chinese poetic term for the surroundings of a mountain's summit, such as the one at Huangshan.
- Wanderer above the Sea of Fog is an oil painting composed in 1818 by the German Romantic artist Caspar David Friedrich depicting this phenomenon.

== See also ==
- Hebacong Sea of Clouds
