= Baybay Boulevard =

Promenade in Borongan, Eastern Samar

- Beach
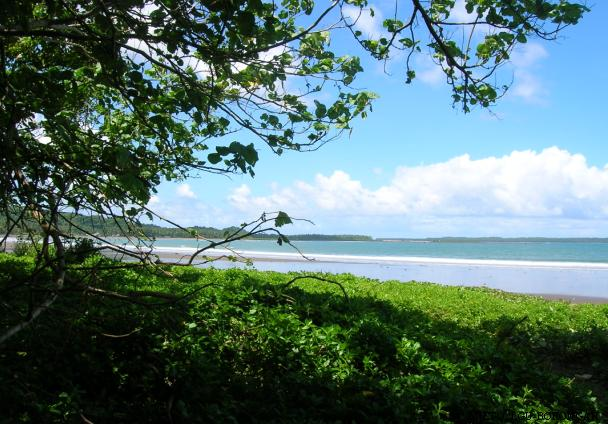

- Coordinates: 11.613369°N 125.438421°E
- Location: Borongan, Eastern Samar, Philippines
- Operator: Borongan City Tourism Office

Baybay Boulevard is a promenade with a beach in Borongan, Eastern Samar, Philippines.

== Geography ==
The coast begins from the Lo-om River, then going north for 1.5 kilometers, until Sabang River.

== Tourism ==
There are eateries spanning the beach, with a skateboard park and a basketball court, there are also parks beside the beach.

The tourism office established a program called Surf in the City holding surfing events, including the 2nd National Surfing Competition held from November 24–26, 2023.

The beach holds numerous events, local and national, including the 2024 Miss Earth beachwear competition, and a national kayaking race.
