= Ando Island =

Island in Eastern Samar, Philippines

Native name: Puro Halaba
- Location within Philippines

Geography
- Location: Pacific Ocean
- Coordinates: 11°38′33″N 125°28′46″E

Administration
- Philippines
- City: Borongan
- Province: Eastern Samar
- Region: Eastern Visayas

Demographics
- Population: 878
- Ethnic groups: Filipino

Ando Island is an island in Borongan City, Eastern Samar, Philippines. It has a number of resorts, the Bantayan Cliff which has a hanging hammock, and multiple white-sand beaches and caves.

== Tourism ==
Ando Island has a number of tourist resorts. It has a boat ride from Sabang South, to Ando Island which takes an estimated 30 minutes. After tourists follow a trail, they go to the Bantayan Cliff with a hammock, hanging 35 meters above the ground, overlooking the Pacific Ocean. Because of this, the cliff was endorsed by the Eastern Visayas Tourism Association. Ando Island also contains white-sand beaches and caves.

== Events ==
On November 12, 2013, Typhoon Haiyan devastated the Philippines; in Ando Island a ship resting in the island fell, killing 2 people and making 5 missing. On September 5, 2023, the city government of Borongan announced a national kayaking event. Ando Island was one of the starting places for the kayaking event.
