= Felipe Abrigo National Memorial College of Arts and Trades =

Public school in Eastern Samar, Philippines

Coordinates: 11°01′41″N 125°44′02″E

The Felipe Abrigo National Memorial College of Arts and Trades is a tertiary educational institution located in Guiuan, Eastern Samar, Philippines.

== History ==
On June 18, 1961, Republic Act No. 3409 was passed into law; it created the Southern Samar National School of Arts and Trades. Twenty one years after, Batas Pambansa Blg. 147 became law, which changed Southern Samar's name to Felipe Abrigo National Memorial School of Arts and Trades. On May 18, 1992, Southern Samar National School of Arts and Trades became a college, and was renamed Southern Samar National School of Arts and Trades.
