= 1965 Samar division plebiscite =

- November 9, 1965
- Outcome: Proposal accepted

Results
Choice	Votes	%
Yes	135,259	89.42%
No	16,002	10.58%
Total votes	151,261	100.00%

The 1965 Samar division plebiscite was a plebiscite held in the province of Samar on November 9, 1965. As required by Republic Act No. 4221 approved on June 19, 1965, the plebiscite was conducted to consent the voters of Samar on the proposal to divide the province into three separate provinces: Eastern Samar, Northern Samar and Western Samar. The plebiscite was held concurrently with the 1965 Philippine general election and the results were announced on February 15, 1966. The law was ratified to formalize the division.

== Background ==
Samar was established as a distinct province in 1768 after it was separated from Leyte. A previous division between Samar and Leyte occurred in 1747 but was reversed in 1762 due to Jesuit complaints, with final approval coming from the King of Spain. In 1777, Samar and Leyte were split for the last time when it was approved in Madrid in 1786 and became effective in 1799; Queen Isabella II of Spain later officially declared Samar as a province in 1841. Samar remained officially undivided since then.

A law was authored in the Congress of the Philippines to split the province into three: Eastern Samar, Northern Samar and Western Samar. Republic Act No. 4221 was passed on June 19, 1965, for such purpose, during the term of President Diosdado Macapagal. The following are the then-proposed divisions of the three provinces:

- Eastern Samar – Arteche, Balangiga, Balangkayan, Can-avid, Dolores, General MacArthur, Giporlos, Guiuan, Hernani, Lawaan, Llorente, Maydolong, Mercedes, Oras, Quinapondan, Salcedo, San Julian, San Policarpo, Sulat, and Taft, with Borongan as its capital
- Northern Samar – Allen, Bobon, Capul, Catubig, Gamay, Laoang, Lapinig, Las Navas, Lavezares, Mondragon, Palapag, Pambujan, San Antonio, San Isidro, San Jose, and San Roque, with Catarman as its capital
- Western Samar – Almagro, Basey, Calbiga, Calbayog, Daram, Gandara, Hinabangan, Jiabong, Marabut, Matuguinao, Motiong, Pinabacdao, San Jose de Buan, San Sebastian, Santa Rita, Santo Niño, Talalora, Tarangnan, Villareal, Wright, and Zumarraga, with Catbalogan as its capital

Section 9 of the law states that, upon the establishment of the new provinces, the obligations, funds, assets, and other properties of the old province of Samar shall be distributed equally among the three new provinces, to be carried out by the President of the Philippines based on the recommendation of the Auditor General.

== Results ==
From a total of 151,261 votes that were cast in the plebiscite, 135,259 votes or 89.42 percent of the total votes cast were for the division of the province of Samar into the provinces of Eastern Samar, Northern Samar, and Western Samar.

Choice	Votes	%
For	135,259	89.42
Against	16,002	10.58
Total	151,261	100.00
Source: Government Printing Office

== Aftermath ==
The provisions of Republic Act No. 4221 went into effect following the election of the first local officials of the new provinces on November 14, 1967. However, the last governor of undivided Samar, Esteban Piczon, had continued as the first governor of Western Samar from 1965 to 1967. Meanwhile, the incumbent Samar representatives—Eladio Balite (1st district), Fernando Veloso (2nd district) and Felipe Abrigo (3rd district)—were first re-elected to their original seats in concurrently with the 1965 plebiscite before being redistricted to the newly created lone districts of Northern, Western, and Eastern Samar, respectively, for the duration of the 6th Congress. Calbayog, having been part of Samar's 1st district along with the present-day towns of Northern Samar, became part of Western Samar's lone district.
