= Jiabong =

Municipality in Samar, Philippines

- Municipality
- Municipality of Jiabong
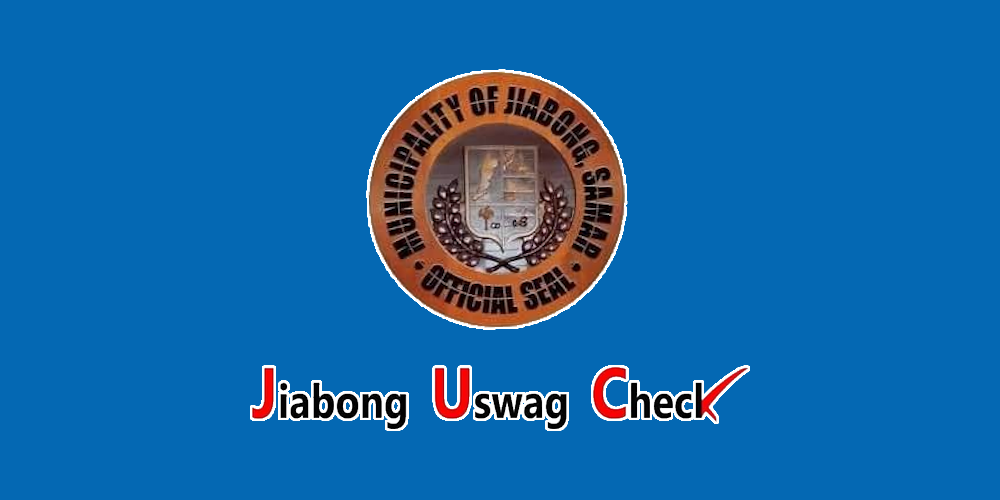
- Flag
- Etymology: Hia-an
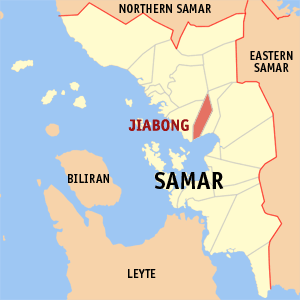
- Map of Samar with Jiabong highlighted
- Interactive map of Jiabong
- Location within the Philippines
- Coordinates: 11°45′45″N 124°57′07″E
- Country: Philippines
- Region: Eastern Visayas
- Province: Samar
- District: 2nd district
- Barangays: 34 (see Barangays)

Government
  - Type: Sangguniang Bayan
  - Mayor: Julie U. Cereno
  - Vice Mayor: Jocelyn U. De Jesus
  - Representative: Reynolds Michael Tan
  - Councilors: List: • Placida R. Jabien; • Rolando B. Amores; • Federico I. Ebit; • Claudio L. Gabiana; • Armingol J. Cabubas; • Anabel C. Pabua; • Meldrito A. Jaboli; • Sidney I. Uy; DILG Masterlist of Officials
  - Electorate: 14,768 voters (2025)

Area
  - Total: 67.70 km^{2} (26.14 sq mi)
- Elevation: 56 m (184 ft)
- Highest elevation: 421 m (1,381 ft)
- Lowest elevation: 0 m (0 ft)

Population (2024 census)
  - Total: 19,482
  - Density: 287.8/km^{2} (745.3/sq mi)
  - Households: 4,567

Economy
  - Income class: 4th municipal income class
  - Poverty incidence: 28.43% (2023)
  - Revenue: ₱ 226.8 million (2024)
  - Assets: ₱ 454.1 million (2024)
  - Expenditure: ₱ 145.3 million (2024)
  - Liabilities: ₱ 146.1 million (2024)

Service provider
  - Electricity: Samar 2 Electric Cooperative (SAMELCO 2)
- Time zone: UTC+8 (PST)
- ZIP code: 6701
- PSGC: 0806009000
- IDD : area code: +63 (0)55
- Native languages: Waray; Tagalog

Jiabong, officially the Municipality of Jiabong (Waray: Bungto han Jiabong; Tagalog: Bayan ng Jiabong), is a municipality in the province of Samar, Philippines. According to the 2024 census, it has a population of 19,482 people.

Jiabong was created in 1948 from the barrios of Jiabong, Jia-an, Malino, San Fernando, Casapa, Camorubo-an, Lulugayan, Macabitas Paglayogan, Dogongan, Bayog, and Malobago, formerly part of Catbalogan.

== Etymology ==
The name Jiabong is a combination of the terms “Hiya-an” which means a “place of preparation before an attack” and “bong” which is actually “the sound of a canon gun”. According to the legend, during Spanish time, villagers from Motiong, Paranas and San Sebastian fled to Casandig (now Jiabong) to seek refuge from the invading pirates who killed, robbed and held them as captives.

To rescue the villagers, the Spanish soldiers and guardia civil camped at Casandig and mounted their preparations for an eventual pirate attack. The Spanish soldiers cried “Ensiqueda Fuego, Hia-bong!” as cannons were fired on the invaders. After this victorious fight, remained two words: Jia-bong.

== History ==
In 1882, during the Spanish regime in the Philippines, Jiabong was made into a town or municipio. It was made as the cabeza de barangay, incorporating the barangays of Jia-an, San Fernando, Malino, Camarubo-an and the rest of the barangays that were founded later. During the Filipino-American war in 1900 to 1904, Catbalogan, Samar, the capital town, was placed under military rule. Jiabong became a barrio of Catbalgan from 1905 until June 15, 1948,

Jiabong became a separate municipality of Samar and got its independence from the Municipality of Catbalogan on October 22, 1948, when Congress approved House Bill No. 1812 into law. Under Republic Act. No. 269. On October 27, 1948, Jiabong was inaugurated as a municipality. President Elpidio Qurino appointed Domingo Jabinal as the Municipal Mayor and Eleuterio Bacarra as the Vice Mayor.

== Geography ==
=== Barangays ===
Jiabong is politically subdivided into 34 barangays. Each barangay consists of puroks and some have sitios.

- Bawang
- Bugho
- Camarubo-an
- Candayao
- Cantongtong
- Casapa
- Catalina
- Cristina
- Dogongan
- Garcia
- Hinaga
- Jia-an
- Jidanao
- Lulugayan
- Macabetas
- Malino
- Malobago (Villalinda)
- Mercedes
- Nagbac
- Parina
- Barangay No. 1 (Poblacion)
- Barangay No. 2 (Poblacion)
- Barangay No. 3 (Poblacion)
- Barangay No. 4 (Poblacion)
- Barangay No. 5 (Poblacion)
- Barangay No. 6 (Poblacion)
- Barangay No. 7 (Poblacion)
- Barangay No. 8 (Poblacion)
- Salvacion
- San Andres
- San Fernando
- San Miguel
- Tagbayaon
- Victory

=== Climate ===
Climate data for Jiabong, Samar
Month	Jan	Feb	Mar	Apr	May	Jun	Jul	Aug	Sep	Oct	Nov	Dec	Year
Mean daily maximum °C (°F)	27 (81)	28 (82)	28 (82)	30 (86)	30 (86)	30 (86)	29 (84)	29 (84)	29 (84)	29 (84)	28 (82)	28 (82)	29 (84)
Mean daily minimum °C (°F)	22 (72)	22 (72)	22 (72)	23 (73)	24 (75)	24 (75)	24 (75)	24 (75)	24 (75)	24 (75)	23 (73)	23 (73)	23 (74)
Average precipitation mm (inches)	114 (4.5)	81 (3.2)	94 (3.7)	81 (3.2)	119 (4.7)	192 (7.6)	186 (7.3)	158 (6.2)	167 (6.6)	185 (7.3)	202 (8.0)	176 (6.9)	1,755 (69.2)
Average rainy days	18.6	14.7	16.8	17.8	22.3	25.9	27.5	26.2	26.6	27.0	24.6	22.3	270.3
Source: Meteoblue

== Demographics ==
Population census of Jiabong
Year	Pop.	±% p.a.
1903	2,439	—
1948	6,437	+2.18%
1960	7,841	+1.66%
1970	9,193	+1.60%
1975	10,161	+2.03%
1980	11,055	+1.70%
1990	12,751	+1.44%
1995	15,484	+3.71%
2000	15,397	−0.12%
2007	15,968	+0.50%
2010	17,075	+2.47%
2015	18,342	+1.37%
2020	19,205	+0.97%
2024	19,482	+0.34%
Source: Philippine Statistics Authority

== Economy ==
Poverty incidence of Jiabong (%)

Source: Philippine Statistics Authority

== Education ==
=== Primary and elementary schools ===
Jiabong has 27 public primary and elementary schools:

- Bawang Elementary School
- Bugho Elementary School
- Camarubo-an Elementary School
- Candayao Primary School
- Cantongtong Elementary School
- Casapa Elementary School
- Catalina Elementary School
- Cristina Primary School
- Dogongan Elementary School
- Garcia Primary School
- Hinaga Primary School
- Jia-An Elementary School
- Jiabong Central School
- Jidanao Primary School
- Lulugayan Elementary School
- Macabetas Elementary School
- Malino Elementary School
- Malobago Elementary School
- Mercedes Elementary School
- Nagbac Elementary School
- Parina Elementary School
- Salvacion Primary School
- San Andres Elementary School
- San Fernando Elementary School
- San Miguel Primary School
- Tagbayaon Elementary School
- Victory Elementary School

=== High schools ===
Jiabong also has three public high schools:

- Casapa National High School
- Jiabong National High School
- Malino National High School
