= Pinabacdao =

Municipality in Samar, Philippines

- Municipality
- Municipality of Pinabacdao, Bayan ng Pinabacdao
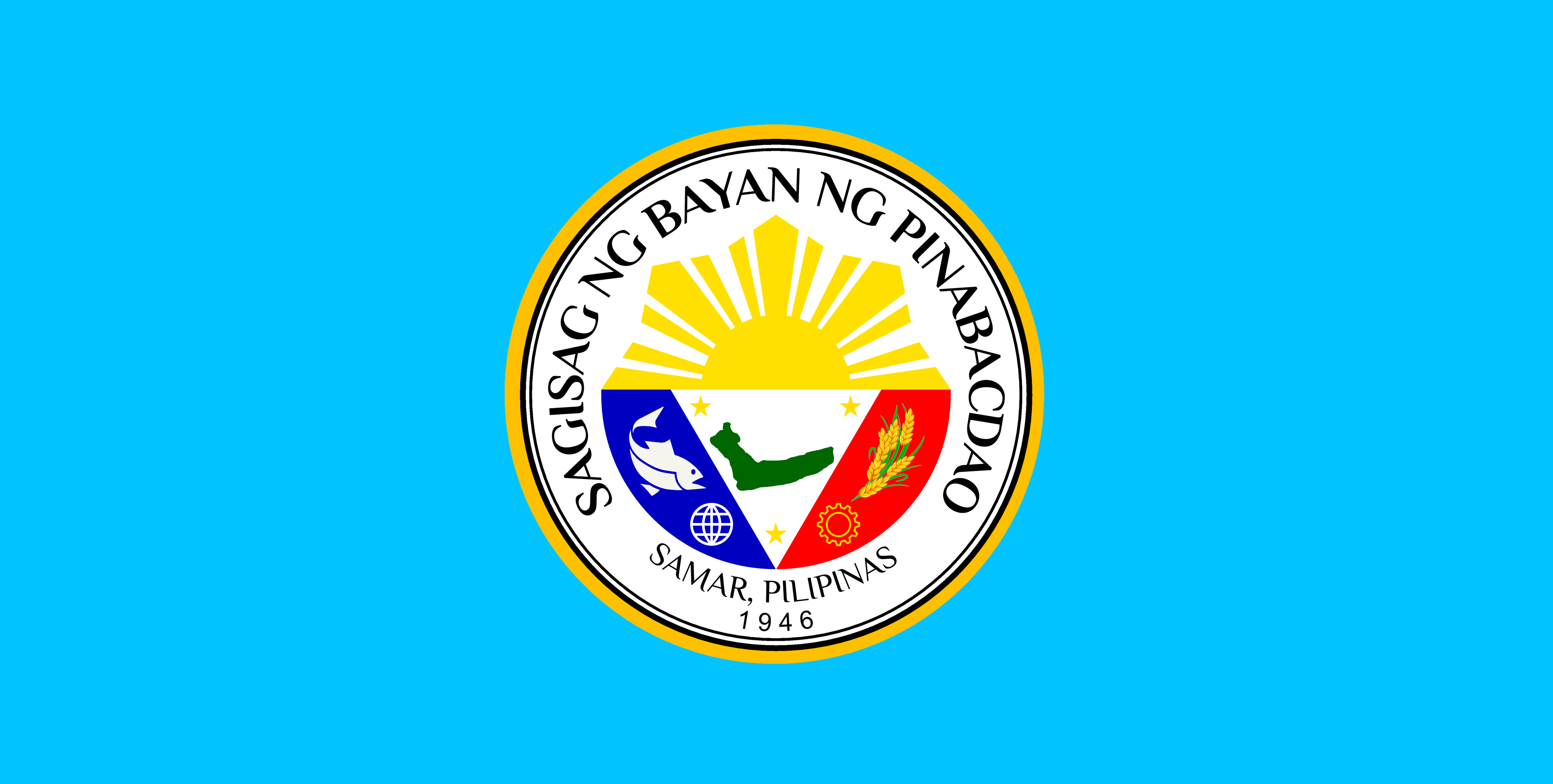
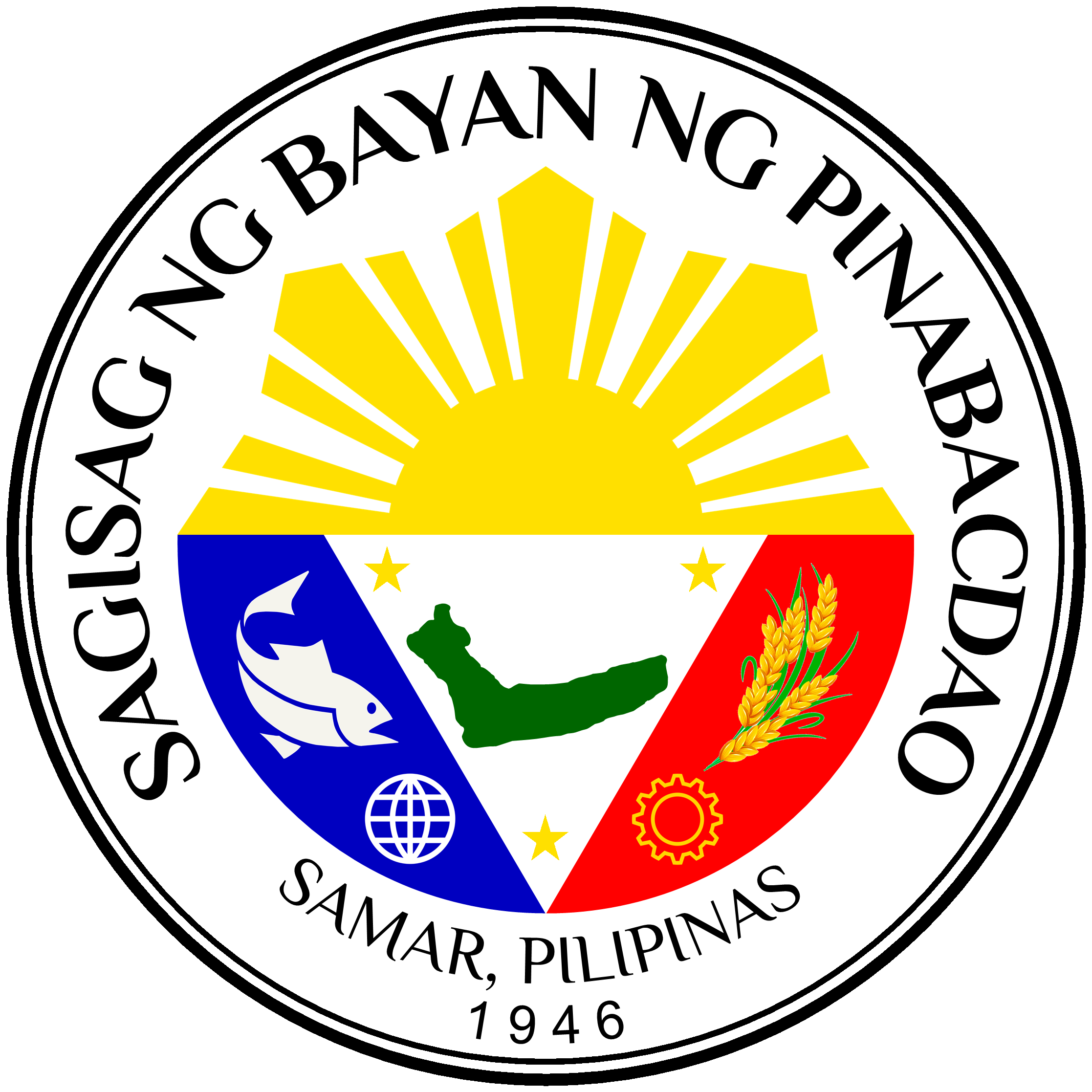
- Flag Seal
- Nickname: "The Home of Mayaw-Mayaw Festival"
- Motto: "Small Town, Big Dreams"
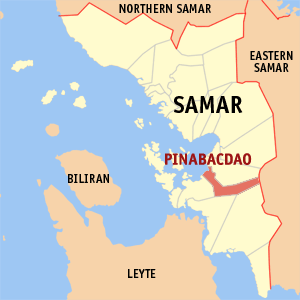
- Map of Samar with Pinabacdao highlighted
- Interactive map of Pinabacdao
- Location within the Philippines
- Coordinates: 11°37′N 124°59′E
- Country: Philippines
- Region: Eastern Visayas
- Province: Samar
- District: 2nd district
- Founded: 1749
- Reestablished: July 16, 1946
- Barangays: 24 (see Barangays)

Government
  - Type: Sangguniang Bayan
  - Mayor: Engr. Teodorico A. Mabag
  - Vice Mayor: Edgar Tonelete
  - Representative: Reynolds Michael Tan
  - Councilors: List: • Rosamarie T. Badenas; • Eliseo B. Cabornay; • Maribel P. Germano; • Jose Santiago T. Quijano; • Samuel R. Lagario; • Roberto M. Balundo; • Clemente O. Sevillena; • Ernesto S. Labro Jr.; DILG Masterlist of Officials
  - Electorate: 13,450 voters (2025)

Area
  - Total: 183.06 km^{2} (70.68 sq mi)
- Elevation: 16 m (52 ft)
- Highest elevation: 160 m (520 ft)
- Lowest elevation: 0 m (0 ft)

Population (2024 census)
  - Total: 18,639
  - Density: 101.82/km^{2} (263.71/sq mi)
  - Households: 4,158

Economy
  - Income class: 3rd municipal income class
  - Poverty incidence: 32.88% (2023)
  - Revenue: ₱ 139.6 million (2024)
  - Assets: ₱ 420.9 million (2024)
  - Expenditure: ₱ 137.6 million (2024)
  - Liabilities: ₱ 106.8 million (2024)

Service provider
  - Electricity: Samar 2 Electric Cooperative (SAMELCO 2)
- Time zone: UTC+8 (PST)
- ZIP code: 6707
- PSGC: 0806013000
- IDD : area code: +63 (0)55
- Native languages: Waray; Tagalog

Pinabacdao, officially the Municipality of Pinabacdao (Waray: Bungto han Pinabacdao; Tagalog: Bayan ng Pinabacdao), is a municipality in the province of Samar, Philippines. According to the 2024 census, it has a population of 18,639 people.

It is considered as the center of rice production in the province of Samar. The home of Mayaw-Mayaw Festival, an ethnic and dance festival celebrated every May 10 of each year. Mayaw-Mayaw Festival won second runner-up in the festival dance competition and first prize winner in the float design competition during the 2015 Aliwan Fiesta which was held on April 23–25 in the cities of Manila and Pasay.

== Etymology ==
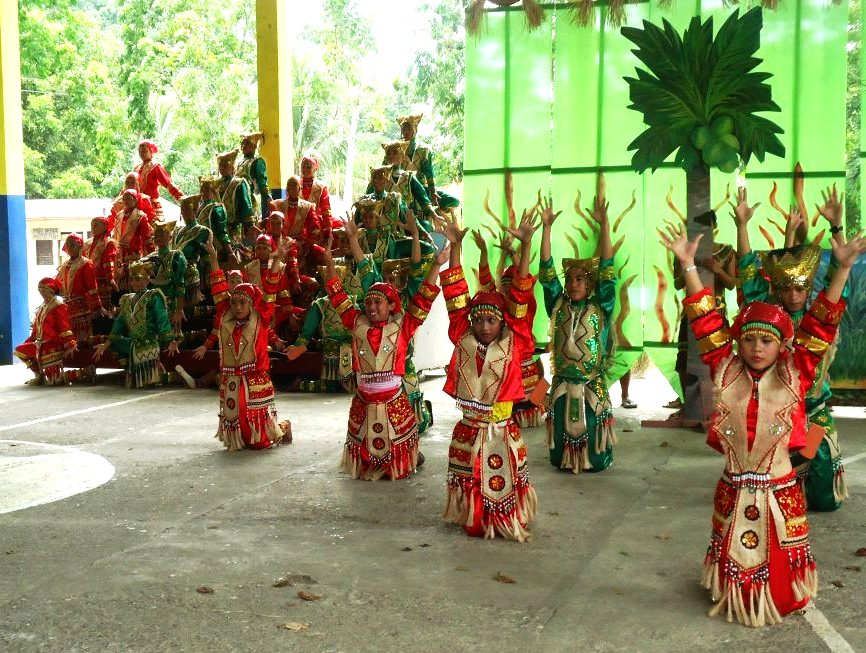
Mayaw-Mayaw Festival of Pinabacdao

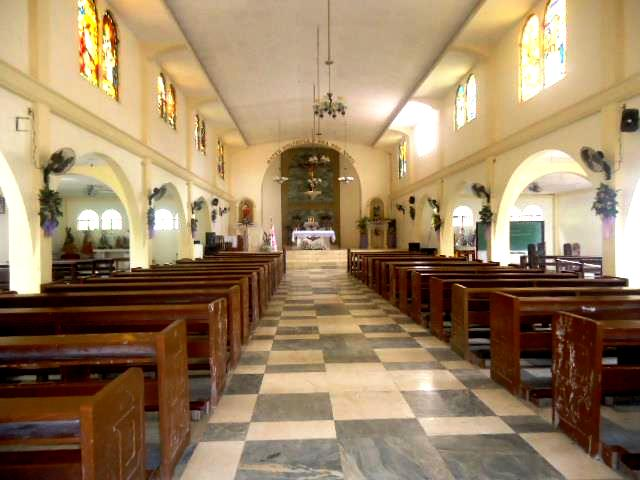
Our Lady of Sorrows Parish interior

The term "Pinabácdao" or "Pinabakdaw" is a Waray Sinamar-Lineyte dialect that means "asked to stand" in English Language or simply "pinatayó" in Filipino Language. But in the book Atlas de Filipinas by José María Algué, SJ - a Spanish-Roman Catholic priest and meteorologist in the observatory of Manila published in 1899 (In 1900 published in English: Atlas of the Philippine Islands by the United States Coast and Geodetic Survey, now the U.S. National Geodetic Survey); Pinabacdao was cited as Pinabágdao and listed as a pueblo or town in the former island province of Samar.

Due to lack of official and authenticated historical accounts pertaining to the origin of the town's name, the municipal government is only relying on folktales which were handed from prominent ancestors to their eager descendants. Folktales revealed that the town of Pinabacdao got its present name by the time when the Philippines was still under the Spanish colonial era; the provincial governor of Samar asked Capitan Doquerez (believed to be the founder and first mayor of Pinabacdao) as to what punishment he would impose to those who violated any rule or law. Doquerez insisted that he will not impose fines and imprisonment, instead they will be punished by asking them to "bakdaw" or stand on an ant colony. The Spanish governor was then amused and concluded that since the punishment or "pena" in Spanish language is to "bakdaw" or stand the town deserves to be called "Pena-bakdaw" (respelled as Pinabacdao).

Another folktale or legend surrounding the town suggests that Pinabacdao's name was derived from miscommunication. These was the time when according to the folktale during the early years of settlement, officers from the Samar provincial government (probably on a mapping, census or exploratory survey) passed along the newly organized town and saw a man tied on a pole, standing on an ant colony. The Spanish officers asked one of the townsmen as to what is the name of the place. The townsman, not understanding the question in Spanish and thinking that the officer was pertaining to the tied man standing on ant colony immediately replied in Waray-waray dialect - "Pinabakdaw" or simply "asked to stand". This story was believed to be the reason why the bureaucrats recorded the name of the town as Pinabacdao.

In terms of official government record, the town is officially known as Pinabacdao by virtue of Executive Order No. 2 signed by president Manuel A. Roxas on July 8, 1946, and took effect on July 16, 1946.

== History ==
Pinabacdao was established in 1749 but became a barrio in 1902 as part of the Municipality of Calbiga. It was then reestablished by Executive Order No. 02 series of 1946 issued by President Manuel A. Roxas, and separated from Calbiga as a reestablished municipality on July 16, 1946.

== Geography ==
Pinabacdao lies at the southwest central coast of Samar Island and crossed along by the Pan-Philippine Highway. Pinabacdao is bordered to the north by the municipality of Calbiga; to the east by the capital city of Borongan in the province of Eastern Samar; to the west by the municipality of Villareal and Villareal Bay; and to the south by the municipalities of Sta. Rita and Basey.

=== Barangays ===
The municipality of Pinabacdao is politically divided into 24 barangays. Each barangay consists of puroks and some have sitios.

It is the smallest unit of local government in the Philippines. Each barangay has its own chairperson and councilors which forms the barangay council (Tagalog: "Sanguniang Baranggay").

For administrative and statistical convenience, barangays are group into two districts - the Pinabacdao East District and Pinabacdao West District. The East district is composed of barangays situated in high altitude areas or those located in the eastern part of the municipality. Barangays located along Pan-Philippine Highway/National Road or commonly referred as Maharlika Highway (Tagalog: "Daang Maharlika") comprises the West District or those located along the western coastal and lowland areas. These districts have no form of any local government.

Barangay^{[A]}	District	Population			±% p.a.	Classification	PSGC
		(2015)		(2010)			
Bangon	West District	7.8%	1,425	1,243	2.64%	Rural	086013001
Barangay 1, Poblacion	West District	3.5%	641	656	−0.44%	Urban	086013002
Barangay 2, Poblacion	West District	4.9%	895	766	3.01%	Rural	086013003
Botoc	West District	4.1%	750	697	1.41%	Rural	086013004
Bugho	East District	1.4%	254	237	1.33%	Rural	086013005
Calampong	West District	3.1%	572	512	2.13%	Rural	086013006
Canlobo	East District	2.1%	392	276	6.91%	Rural	086013007
Catigawan	East District	0.7%	135	134	0.14%	Rural	086013008
Dolores (Kasang-an)	West District	4.1%	742	670	1.96%	Rural	086013010
Lale	West District	5.2%	945	820	2.74%	Rural	086013011
Lawaan	East District	1.8%	327	305	1.33%	Rural	086013012
Laygayon	West District	5.4%	994	816	2.64%	Rural	086013013
Layo	East District	1.4%	260	219	3.32%	Rural	086013014
Loctob	East District	1.4%	262	213	4.02%	Rural	086013015
Madalunot (Antol)	West District	5.0%	914	730	4.37%	Rural	086013016
Magdawat	East District	2.5%	459	468	−0.37%	Rural	086013017
Mambog	West District	7.7%	1,412	1,368	0.60%	Rural	086013018
Manaing	East District	1.7%	312	233	5.72%	Rural	086013019
Nabong	West District	7.2%	1,323	1,084	3.87%	Rural	086013026
Obayan	West District	6.8%	1,234	1,105	2.12%	Rural	086013020
Pahug	West District	5.0%	921	830	2.00%	Rural	086013021
Parasanon	West District	10.4%	1,902	1,736	1.75%	Rural	086013022
Pelaon	East District	4.5%	829	754	1.82%	Rural	086013023
San Isidro	West District	1.9%	352	336	0.89%	Rural	086013025
Total			18,252	16,208	2.29%		
1. Other names that are known in locality are italicized.

=== Climate ===
Pinabacdao's climate is classified as tropical. Pinabacdao is a town with a significant rainfall. Even in the driest month there is a lot of rain. This location is classified as Af by Köppen and Geiger. The average annual temperature is 27.1 °C in Pinabacdao. The average annual rainfall is 2739 mm.

Climate data for Pinabacdao, Samar
Month	Jan	Feb	Mar	Apr	May	Jun	Jul	Aug	Sep	Oct	Nov	Dec	Year
Mean daily maximum °C (°F)	27 (81)	28 (82)	28 (82)	30 (86)	30 (86)	30 (86)	29 (84)	29 (84)	29 (84)	29 (84)	28 (82)	28 (82)	29 (84)
Mean daily minimum °C (°F)	22 (72)	22 (72)	22 (72)	23 (73)	24 (75)	24 (75)	24 (75)	24 (75)	24 (75)	24 (75)	23 (73)	23 (73)	23 (74)
Average precipitation mm (inches)	114 (4.5)	81 (3.2)	94 (3.7)	81 (3.2)	119 (4.7)	192 (7.6)	186 (7.3)	158 (6.2)	167 (6.6)	185 (7.3)	202 (8.0)	176 (6.9)	1,755 (69.2)
Average rainy days	18.6	14.7	16.8	17.8	22.3	25.9	27.5	26.2	26.6	27.0	24.6	22.3	270.3
Source: Meteoblue

== Demographics ==
Population census of Pinabacdao
Year	Pop.	±% p.a.
1903	2,142	—
1948	5,214	+2.00%
1960	7,472	+3.04%
1970	9,723	+2.67%
1975	8,373	−2.95%
1980	9,389	+2.32%
1990	10,361	+0.99%
1995	11,590	+2.12%
2000	13,167	+2.77%
2007	14,492	+1.33%
2010	16,208	+4.16%
2015	18,252	+2.29%
2020	18,136	−0.13%
2024	18,639	+0.66%
Source: Philippine Statistics Authority

== Economy ==
Poverty incidence of Pinabacdao

Source: Philippine Statistics Authority

== Education ==
To carry out its mandates and objectives, the Philippine Department of Education is organized into two major structural components. The Central Office maintains the overall administration of basic education at the national level. The Field Offices are responsible for the regional and local coordination and administration of the Department's mandate.

At the sub-national level, the Field Offices are consist of regional offices and provincial/city schools division. Under the supervision of the provincial/city schools division offices are school districts.

=== School District Pinabacdao ===
Before the creation of a separate school district for the municipality, schools were under the supervision of the District Pinabacdao-San Sebastian. But due to an increasing number of schools in the municipality, Pinabacdao and San Sebastian municipalities had their own school district . The School District Pinabacdao is tasked to manage and govern schools except the three secondary schools which are under the direct supervision of the Schools Division of Samar.

Primary Schools

- Bugho Primary School (BPS)
- Canlobo Primary School (CanPS)
- Catigawan Primary School (CPS)
- Loctob Primary School (LPS)
- Magdawat Primary School (MPS)

Elementary schools

- Bangon Elementary School (BES)
- Botoc Elementary School (BotES)
- Calampong Elementary School (CES)
- Dolores Elementary School (DES)
- Lale Elementary School (LES)
- Laygayon Elementary School (LayES)
- Madalunot Elementary School (MadES)
- Mambog Elementary School (MES)
- Nabong Elementary School (NES)
- Obayan Elementary School (OES)
- Pahug Elementary School (PES)
- Parasanon Elementary School (ParES)
- Pinabacdao Central Elementary School (PCES)

=== Secondary/High Schools ===
Name of School	Abbreviation	Campus	Location
Parasanon National High School	ParNHS	Main	Barangay Parasanon
Pinabacdao National High School	PNHS	Main	Barangay 1, Poblacion
Quintin Quijano Sr. Agricultural School (former West Coast Agricultural High School-WCAHS)	QQSAS	Main	Barangay Mambog

=== College and Training Center ===
- Pinabacdao One-Stop Training Center (POSTC)
- University of Eastern Philippines- Pinabacdao College of Agriculture (UEP-PCA)

== See also ==
- List of renamed cities and municipalities in the Philippines
