= Samar's 2nd congressional district =

Legislative district of the Philippines

- Constituency for the House of Representatives of the Philippines
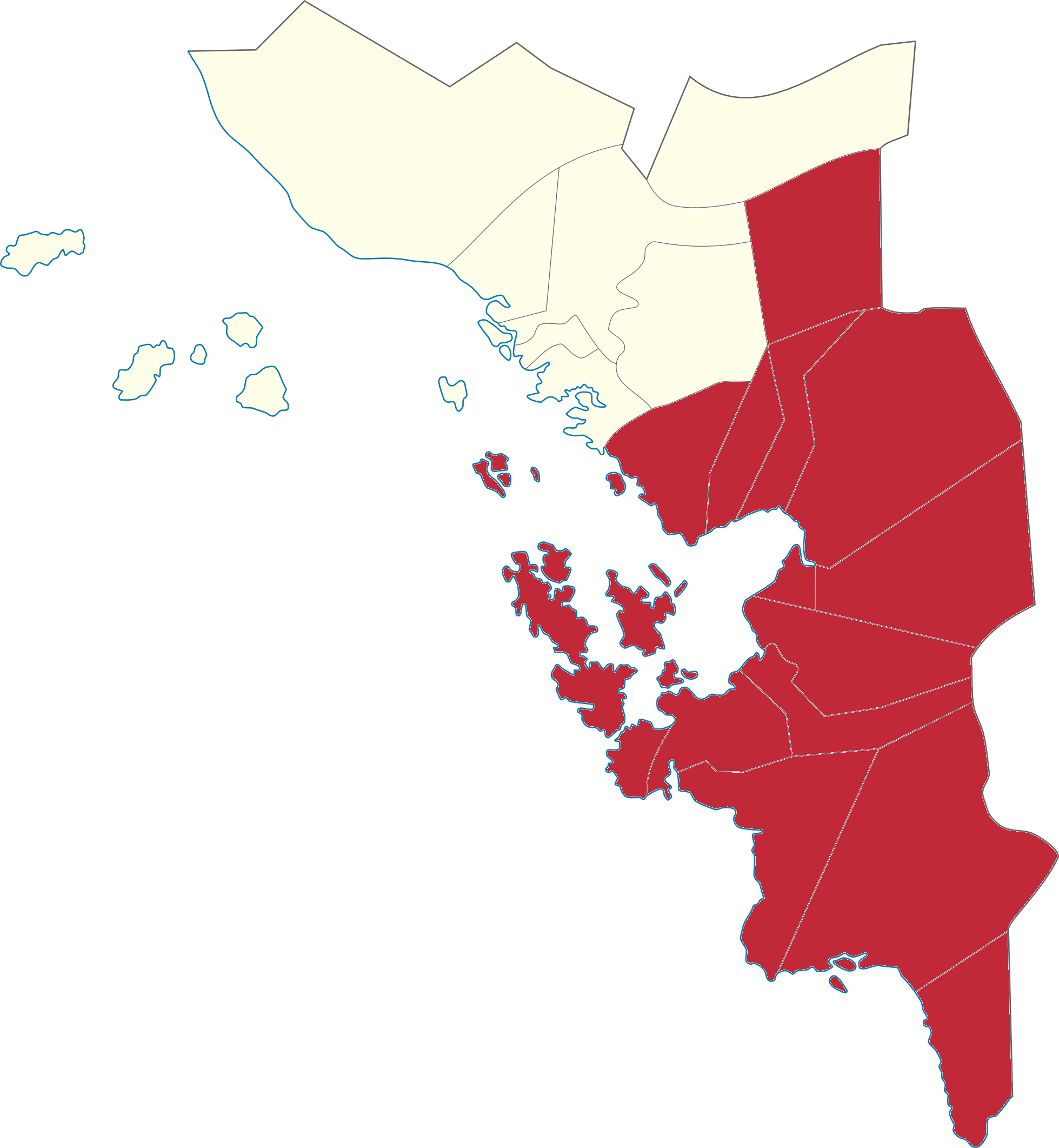
- Boundary of Samar's 2nd congressional district in Samar

- Location of Samar within the Philippines
- Province: Samar
- Region: Eastern Visayas
- Population: 454,953 (2020)
- Electorate: 336,756 (2022)
- Major settlements: 16 LGUs: Cities; Catbalogan; Municipalities; Basey; Calbiga; Daram; Hinabangan; Jiabong; Marabut; Motiong; Paranas; Pinabacdao; San Jose de Buan; San Sebastian; Santa Rita; Talalora; Villareal; Zumarraga
- Area: 3,778.89 km^{2} (1,459.04 sq mi)

Current constituency
- Created: 1907
- Representative: Reynolds Michael Tan
- Political party: Lakas–CMD
- Congressional bloc: Minority

Samar's 2nd congressional district is one of the two congressional districts of the Philippines in the province of Samar. It has been represented in the House of Representatives of the Philippines since 1916 and earlier in the Philippine Assembly from 1907 to 1916. The district consists of the provincial capital city of Catbalogan and adjacent municipalities of Basey, Calbiga, Daram, Hinabangan, Jiabong, Marabut, Motiong, Paranas, Pinabacdao, San Jose de Buan, San Sebastian, Santa Rita, Talalora, Villareal and Zumarraga. Prior to its second dissolution in 1965 due to the split of the historical province of Samar, it consisted of the old province's western portion that is now known as Samar (formerly Western Samar), except Calbayog, which was part of the 1st district. It is currently represented in the 20th Congress by Reynolds Michael Tan of the Lakas–CMD.

== Representation history ==
#	Image	Member	Term of office		Legislature	Party	Electoral history	Constituent LGUs
#	Image	Member	Start	End	Legislature	Party	Electoral history	Constituent LGUs
=== Samar's 2nd district for the Philippine Assembly ===
District created January 9, 1907.
1		Luciano Sinko	October 16, 1907	October 16, 1909	1st	Nacionalista	Elected in 1907.	1907–1916; Almagro, Basey, Calbiga, Catbalogan, Gandara, Santa Rita, Santo Niño, Tarangnan, Villareal, Wright, Zumarraga
2		Benito Azanza	October 16, 1909	October 16, 1912	2nd	Nacionalista	Elected in 1909.	1907–1916; Almagro, Basey, Calbiga, Catbalogan, Gandara, Santa Rita, Santo Niño, Tarangnan, Villareal, Wright, Zumarraga
3		José Sabarre	October 16, 1912	October 16, 1916	3rd	Nacionalista	Elected in 1912.	1907–1916; Almagro, Basey, Calbiga, Catbalogan, Gandara, Santa Rita, Santo Niño, Tarangnan, Villareal, Wright, Zumarraga
=== Samar's 2nd district for the House of Representatives of the Philippine Islands ===
4		Pastor D. Salazar	October 16, 1916	June 6, 1922	4th	Nacionalista	Elected in 1916.	1916–1935; Almagro, Basey, Calbiga, Catbalogan, Gandara, Santa Rita, Santo Niño, Tarangnan, Villareal, Wright, Zumarraga
4		Pastor D. Salazar	October 16, 1916	June 6, 1922	5th	Nacionalista	Re-elected in 1919.	1916–1935; Almagro, Basey, Calbiga, Catbalogan, Gandara, Santa Rita, Santo Niño, Tarangnan, Villareal, Wright, Zumarraga
5		Pascual B. Azanza	June 6, 1922	June 5, 1928	6th	Demócrata	Elected in 1922.	1916–1935; Almagro, Basey, Calbiga, Catbalogan, Gandara, Santa Rita, Santo Niño, Tarangnan, Villareal, Wright, Zumarraga
5		Pascual B. Azanza	June 6, 1922	June 5, 1928	7th	Demócrata	Re-elected in 1925.	1916–1935; Almagro, Basey, Calbiga, Catbalogan, Gandara, Santa Rita, Santo Niño, Tarangnan, Villareal, Wright, Zumarraga
6		Serafín S. Marabut	June 5, 1928	September 16, 1935	8th	Nacionalista; Consolidado	Elected in 1928.	1916–1935; Almagro, Basey, Calbiga, Catbalogan, Gandara, Santa Rita, Santo Niño, Tarangnan, Villareal, Wright, Zumarraga
6		Serafín S. Marabut	June 5, 1928	September 16, 1935	9th	Nacionalista; Consolidado	Re-elected in 1931.	1916–1935; Almagro, Basey, Calbiga, Catbalogan, Gandara, Santa Rita, Santo Niño, Tarangnan, Villareal, Wright, Zumarraga
6		Serafín S. Marabut	June 5, 1928	September 16, 1935	10th	Nacionalista; Democrático	Re-elected in 1934.	1916–1935; Almagro, Basey, Calbiga, Catbalogan, Gandara, Santa Rita, Santo Niño, Tarangnan, Villareal, Wright, Zumarraga
#	Image	Member	Term of office		National Assembly	Party	Electoral history	Constituent LGUs
#	Image	Member	Start	End	National Assembly	Party	Electoral history	Constituent LGUs
=== Samar's 2nd district for the National Assembly (Commonwealth of the Philippines) ===
(6)		Serafín S. Marabut	September 16, 1935	May 27, 1936	1st	Nacionalista; Democrático	Re-elected in 1935. Resigned on appointment as Undersecretary of Finance and Director of the Budget Office.	1935–1941; Almagro, Basey, Calbiga, Catbalogan, Gandara, Santa Rita, Santo Niño, Tarangnan, Villareal, Wright, Zumarraga
(5)		Pascual B. Azanza	September 1, 1936	December 30, 1941	1st	Nacionalista; Democrático	Elected in 1936 to finish Marabut's term.	1935–1941; Almagro, Basey, Calbiga, Catbalogan, Gandara, Santa Rita, Santo Niño, Tarangnan, Villareal, Wright, Zumarraga
(5)		Pascual B. Azanza	September 1, 1936	December 30, 1941	2nd	Nacionalista	Re-elected in 1938.	1935–1941; Almagro, Basey, Calbiga, Catbalogan, Gandara, Santa Rita, Santo Niño, Tarangnan, Villareal, Wright, Zumarraga
District dissolved into the two-seat Samar's at-large district for the National Assembly (Second Philippine Republic).
#	Image	Member	Term of office		Common wealth Congress	Party	Electoral history	Constituent LGUs
#	Image	Member	Start	End	Common wealth Congress	Party	Electoral history	Constituent LGUs
=== Samar's 2nd district for the House of Representatives of the Commonwealth of the Philippines ===
District re-created May 24, 1945.
7		Pedro R. Arteche	–	–	1st	Nacionalista	Elected in 1941. Died before start of term.	1945–1946; Almagro, Basey, Calbiga, Catbalogan, Gandara, Santa Rita, Santo Niño, Tarangnan, Villareal, Wright, Zumarraga
#	Image	Member	Term of office		Congress	Party	Electoral history	Constituent LGUs
#	Image	Member	Start	End	Congress	Party	Electoral history	Constituent LGUs
=== Samar's 2nd district for the House of Representatives of the Philippines ===
8		Tito V. Tizon	May 25, 1946	December 30, 1953	1st	Liberal	Elected in 1946.	1946–1949; Almagro, Basey, Calbiga, Catbalogan, Gandara, Santa Rita, Santo Niño, Tarangnan, Villareal, Wright, Zumarraga
8		Tito V. Tizon	May 25, 1946	December 30, 1953	2nd	Liberal	Re-elected in 1949.	1949–1953; Almagro, Basey, Calbiga, Catbalogan, Daram, Gandara, Hinabangan, Jiabong, Marabut, Motiong, Pinabacdao, Santa Rita, Santo Niño, Talalora, Tarangnan, Villareal, Wright, Zumarraga
9		Marciano Lim	December 30, 1953	December 30, 1957	3rd	Nacionalista	Elected in 1953.	1953–1965; Almagro, Basey, Calbiga, Catbalogan, Daram, Gandara, Hinabangan, Jiabong, Marabut, Motiong, Pinabacdao, San Sebastian, Santa Rita, Santo Niño, Talalora, Tarangnan, Villareal, Wright, Zumarraga
10		Valeriano C. Yancha	December 30, 1957	December 30, 1961	4th	Nacionalista	Elected in 1957.	1953–1965; Almagro, Basey, Calbiga, Catbalogan, Daram, Gandara, Hinabangan, Jiabong, Marabut, Motiong, Pinabacdao, San Sebastian, Santa Rita, Santo Niño, Talalora, Tarangnan, Villareal, Wright, Zumarraga
11		Fernando Veloso	December 30, 1961	December 30, 1965	5th	Nacionalista	Elected in 1961. Redistricted to Western Samar's at-large district.	1953–1965; Almagro, Basey, Calbiga, Catbalogan, Daram, Gandara, Hinabangan, Jiabong, Marabut, Motiong, Pinabacdao, San Sebastian, Santa Rita, Santo Niño, Talalora, Tarangnan, Villareal, Wright, Zumarraga
District dissolved into Western Samar's at-large district.
District re-created February 2, 1987.
12		Venancio T. Garduce	June 30, 1987	June 30, 1992	8th	Partido ng Bayan	Elected in 1987.	1987–1992; Basey, Calbiga, Catbalogan, Daram, Hinabangan, Jiabong, Marabut, Motiong, Pinabacdao, San Jose de Buan, San Sebastian, Santa Rita, Talalora, Villareal, Wright, Zumarraga
13		Catalino V. Figueroa	June 30, 1992	June 30, 1998	9th	Lakas	Elected in 1992.	1992–present Basey, Calbiga, Catbalogan, Daram, Hinabangan, Jiabong, Marabut, Motiong, Paranas, Pinabacdao, San Jose de Buan, San Sebastian, Santa Rita, Talalora, Villareal, Zumarraga
13		Catalino V. Figueroa	June 30, 1992	June 30, 1998	10th	Lakas	Re-elected in 1995.	1992–present Basey, Calbiga, Catbalogan, Daram, Hinabangan, Jiabong, Marabut, Motiong, Paranas, Pinabacdao, San Jose de Buan, San Sebastian, Santa Rita, Talalora, Villareal, Zumarraga
14		Antonio Eduardo Nachura	June 30, 1998	June 30, 2004	11th	Liberal	Elected in 1998.	1992–present Basey, Calbiga, Catbalogan, Daram, Hinabangan, Jiabong, Marabut, Motiong, Paranas, Pinabacdao, San Jose de Buan, San Sebastian, Santa Rita, Talalora, Villareal, Zumarraga
14		Antonio Eduardo Nachura	June 30, 1998	June 30, 2004	12th	Liberal	Re-elected in 2001.	1992–present Basey, Calbiga, Catbalogan, Daram, Hinabangan, Jiabong, Marabut, Motiong, Paranas, Pinabacdao, San Jose de Buan, San Sebastian, Santa Rita, Talalora, Villareal, Zumarraga
(13)		Catalino V. Figueroa	June 30, 2004	June 30, 2007	13th	Nacionalista	Elected in 2004.	1992–present Basey, Calbiga, Catbalogan, Daram, Hinabangan, Jiabong, Marabut, Motiong, Paranas, Pinabacdao, San Jose de Buan, San Sebastian, Santa Rita, Talalora, Villareal, Zumarraga
15		Sharee Ann T. Tan	June 30, 2007	June 30, 2010	14th	Lakas	Elected in 2007.	1992–present Basey, Calbiga, Catbalogan, Daram, Hinabangan, Jiabong, Marabut, Motiong, Paranas, Pinabacdao, San Jose de Buan, San Sebastian, Santa Rita, Talalora, Villareal, Zumarraga
16		Milagrosa Tan	June 30, 2010	June 30, 2019	15th	NPC	Elected in 2010.	1992–present Basey, Calbiga, Catbalogan, Daram, Hinabangan, Jiabong, Marabut, Motiong, Paranas, Pinabacdao, San Jose de Buan, San Sebastian, Santa Rita, Talalora, Villareal, Zumarraga
16		Milagrosa Tan	June 30, 2010	June 30, 2019	16th	NPC	Re-elected in 2013.	1992–present Basey, Calbiga, Catbalogan, Daram, Hinabangan, Jiabong, Marabut, Motiong, Paranas, Pinabacdao, San Jose de Buan, San Sebastian, Santa Rita, Talalora, Villareal, Zumarraga
16		Milagrosa Tan	June 30, 2010	June 30, 2019	17th	PDP–Laban	Re-elected in 2016.	1992–present Basey, Calbiga, Catbalogan, Daram, Hinabangan, Jiabong, Marabut, Motiong, Paranas, Pinabacdao, San Jose de Buan, San Sebastian, Santa Rita, Talalora, Villareal, Zumarraga
(15)		Sharee Ann T. Tan	June 30, 2019	June 30, 2022	18th	PDP–Laban	Elected in 2019.	1992–present Basey, Calbiga, Catbalogan, Daram, Hinabangan, Jiabong, Marabut, Motiong, Paranas, Pinabacdao, San Jose de Buan, San Sebastian, Santa Rita, Talalora, Villareal, Zumarraga
17		Reynolds Michael T. Tan	June 30, 2022	Incumbent	19th	Nacionalista	Elected in 2022.	1992–present Basey, Calbiga, Catbalogan, Daram, Hinabangan, Jiabong, Marabut, Motiong, Paranas, Pinabacdao, San Jose de Buan, San Sebastian, Santa Rita, Talalora, Villareal, Zumarraga
17		Reynolds Michael T. Tan	June 30, 2022	Incumbent	20th	Lakas	Re-elected in 2025.	1992–present Basey, Calbiga, Catbalogan, Daram, Hinabangan, Jiabong, Marabut, Motiong, Paranas, Pinabacdao, San Jose de Buan, San Sebastian, Santa Rita, Talalora, Villareal, Zumarraga

== Election results ==
=== 2025 ===
Candidate	Party	Votes	%
Reynolds Michael Tan (incumbent)	Lakas–CMD	219,640	100.00
Total		219,640	100.00
Valid votes		219,640	80.24
Invalid/blank votes		54,080	19.76
Total votes		273,720	100.00
Registered voters/turnout		335,787	81.52
Lakas–CMD hold			
Source: Commission on Elections

=== 2022 ===
2022 Philippine House of Representatives elections
Party	Candidate	Votes	%
Nacionalista	Reynolds Michael Tan	161,825	
NUP	Alvin Abejuela	82,590	
Total votes			100.00%
Nacionalista gain from PDP–Laban			

=== 2019 ===
2019 Philippine House of Representatives elections
Party	Candidate	Votes	%
PDP–Laban	Sharee Ann Tan	124,459	
Lakas	Boy Bolastig	97,236	
Total votes			100.00%
PDP–Laban hold			

=== 2016 ===
2016 Philippine House of Representatives elections
Party	Candidate	Votes	%
NPC	Milagrosa Tan	137,248	69.16%
Liberal	Myrna Ojeda-Tan	61,189	30.84%
Valid ballots		198,437	83.84%
Margin of victory		76,059	38.33%
Invalid or blank votes		38,262	16.16%
Total votes		236,699	100.00%
NPC hold			

=== 2013 ===
2013 Philippine House of Representatives elections
Party	Candidate	Votes	%
NPC	Milagrosa Tan	68,137	43.77
Liberal	Eunice Babalcon	56,312	36.18
UNA	Reynato Latorre	10,242	6.58
Margin of victory		11,825	7.60%
Invalid or blank votes		20,973	13.47
Total votes		155,664	100.00
NPC hold			

=== 2010 ===
2010 Philippine House of Representatives elections
Party	Candidate	Votes	%
Lakas–Kampi	Milagrosa Tan	58,168	36.99
Liberal	Wilfredo Estorninos	39,430	25.08
NPC	Manuel Torresvillas	30,888	19.64
PMP	Catalino Figueroa	22,055	14.03
PDP–Laban	Alvin Abejuela	4,996	3.18
Independent	Urbano Alli, Jr.	1,708	1.09
Valid ballots		157,735	82.11
Invalid or blank votes		34,267	17.89
Total votes		191,512	100.00
Lakas–Kampi hold			

== See also ==
- Legislative districts of Samar
