= Hinabangan =

Municipality in Samar, Philippines

- Municipality
- Municipality of Hinabangan
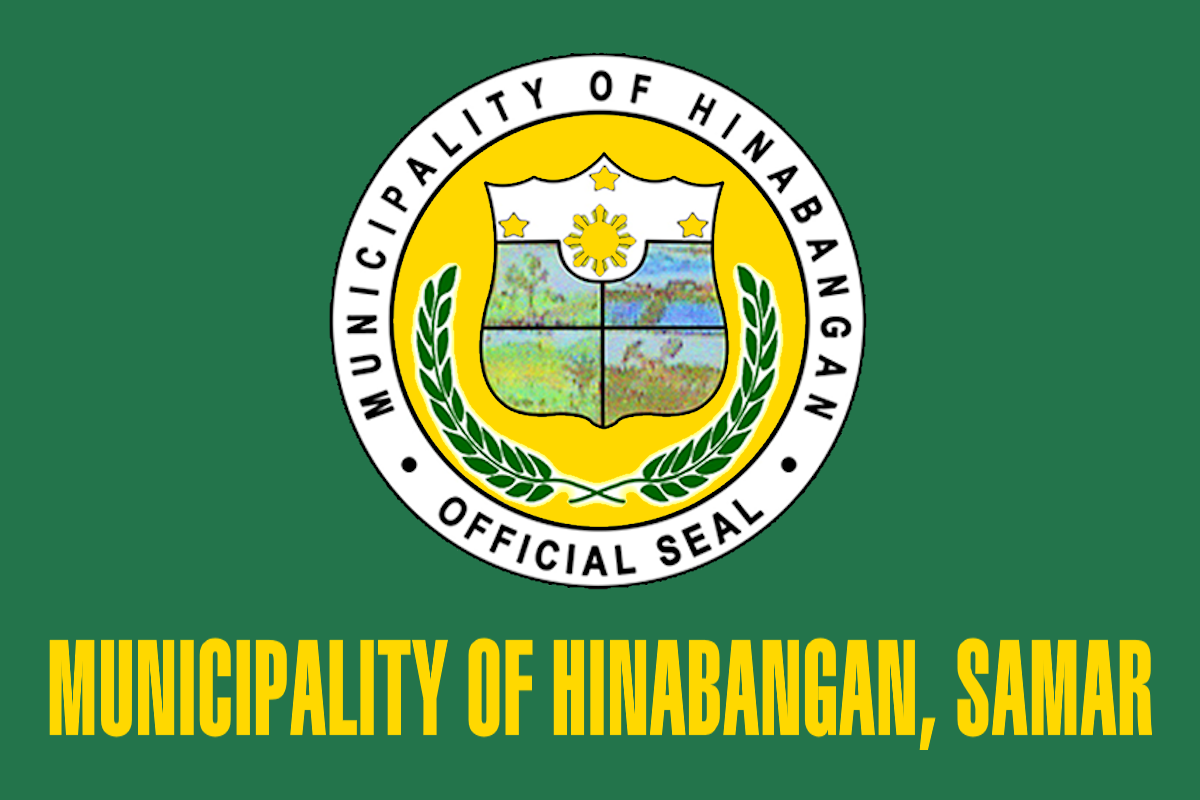
- Flag

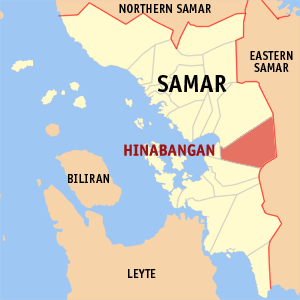
- Map of Samar with Hinabangan highlighted
- Interactive map of Hinabangan
- Location within the Philippines
- Coordinates: 11°42′N 125°04′E
- Country: Philippines
- Region: Eastern Visayas
- Province: Samar
- District: 2nd district
- Founded: 1948
- Barangays: 21 (see Barangays)

Government
  - Type: Sangguniang Bayan
  - Mayor: Clarito P. Rosal
  - Vice Mayor: Arthur Aban
  - Representative: Reynolds Michael Tan
  - Councilors: List: • Francisco B. Irene; • Hector C. Amaro; • Noe A. Deguito; • Ronie A. Pazon; • Gloria C. Tacad; • Rodulfo N. Calutan; • Arthur A. Aban; • Rosendo A. Pocpoc; DILG Masterlist of Officials
  - Electorate: 12,012 voters (2025)

Area
  - Total: 460.08 km^{2} (177.64 sq mi)
- Elevation: 232 m (761 ft)
- Highest elevation: 671 m (2,201 ft)
- Lowest elevation: 0 m (0 ft)

Population (2024 census)
  - Total: 13,791
  - Density: 29.975/km^{2} (77.635/sq mi)
  - Households: 3,075

Economy
  - Income class: 2nd municipal income class
  - Poverty incidence: 31.24% (2023)
  - Revenue: ₱ 215.5 million (2024)
  - Assets: ₱ 53.58 million (2024)
  - Expenditure: ₱ 180.1 million (2024)
  - Liabilities: ₱ 6.927 million (2024)

Service provider
  - Electricity: Samar 2 Electric Cooperative (SAMELCO 2)
- Time zone: UTC+8 (PST)
- ZIP code: 6713
- PSGC: 0806008000
- IDD : area code: +63 (0)55
- Native languages: Waray; Tagalog

Hinabangan, officially the Municipality of Hinabangan (Waray: Bungto han Hinabangan; Tagalog: Bayan ng Hinabangan), is a municipality in the province of Samar, Philippines. According to the 2024 census, it has a population of 13,791 people.

Hinabangan was formed in 1948 from the former municipal districts of Concord and Hinabangan.

== Geography ==
=== Barangays ===
Hinabangan is politically subdivided into 21 barangays. Each barangay consists of puroks and some have sitios.

- Bagacay
- Binobucalan
- Bucalan
- Cabalagnan
- Canano
- Cansolabao
- Concord
- Dalosdoson
- Intik
- Lim-ao
- Osmeña
- Poblacion 1 (Barangay 1)
- Poblacion 2 (Barangay 2)
- Rawis
- San Rafael
- Tabay
- Yabon
- Cabang
- Malihao
- San Jose
- Fatima
- Mugdo

=== Climate ===
Climate data for Hinabangan, Samar
Month	Jan	Feb	Mar	Apr	May	Jun	Jul	Aug	Sep	Oct	Nov	Dec	Year
Mean daily maximum °C (°F)	27 (81)	28 (82)	28 (82)	30 (86)	30 (86)	30 (86)	29 (84)	29 (84)	29 (84)	29 (84)	28 (82)	28 (82)	29 (84)
Mean daily minimum °C (°F)	22 (72)	22 (72)	22 (72)	23 (73)	24 (75)	24 (75)	24 (75)	24 (75)	24 (75)	24 (75)	23 (73)	23 (73)	23 (74)
Average precipitation mm (inches)	114 (4.5)	81 (3.2)	94 (3.7)	81 (3.2)	119 (4.7)	192 (7.6)	186 (7.3)	158 (6.2)	167 (6.6)	185 (7.3)	202 (8.0)	176 (6.9)	1,755 (69.2)
Average rainy days	18.6	14.7	16.8	17.8	22.3	25.9	27.5	26.2	26.6	27.0	24.6	22.3	270.3
Source: Meteoblue

== Demographics ==
Population census of Hinabangan
Year	Pop.	±% p.a.
1918	1,562	—
1939	2,011	+1.21%
1948	7,718	+16.12%
1960	7,004	−0.81%
1970	10,970	+4.58%
1975	12,022	+1.85%
1980	10,786	−2.15%
1990	11,906	+0.99%
1995	12,151	+0.38%
2000	12,120	−0.05%
2007	12,129	+0.01%
2010	12,651	+1.55%
2015	13,673	+1.49%
2020	13,693	+0.03%
2024	13,791	+0.17%
Source: Philippine Statistics Authority

== Economy ==
Poverty incidence of Hinabangan (%)

Source: Philippine Statistics Authority

== Education ==
=== Primary and elementary schools ===
Hinabangan has 19 public primary and elementary schools:

- Bagacay Elementary School
- Binubucalan Elementary School
- Bucalan Primary School
- Cabalagnan Elementary School
- Cabang Elementary School
- Canano Elementary School
- Cansolabao Elementary School
- Concord Elementary School
- Dalosdoson Elementary School
- Fatima Elementary School
- Hinabangan Central School
- Lim-Ao Elementary School
- Malihao Primary School
- Mugdo Elementary School
- Osmena Elementary School
- Rawis Elementary School
- San Rafael Elementary School
- Tabay Elementary School
- Yabon Elementary School

=== High schools ===
Hinabangan also has two public high schools:

- Bagacay National High School
- Hinabangan National High School
