= Marabut, Samar =

Municipality in Samar, Philippines

Marabut
- Municipality
- Municipality of Marabut
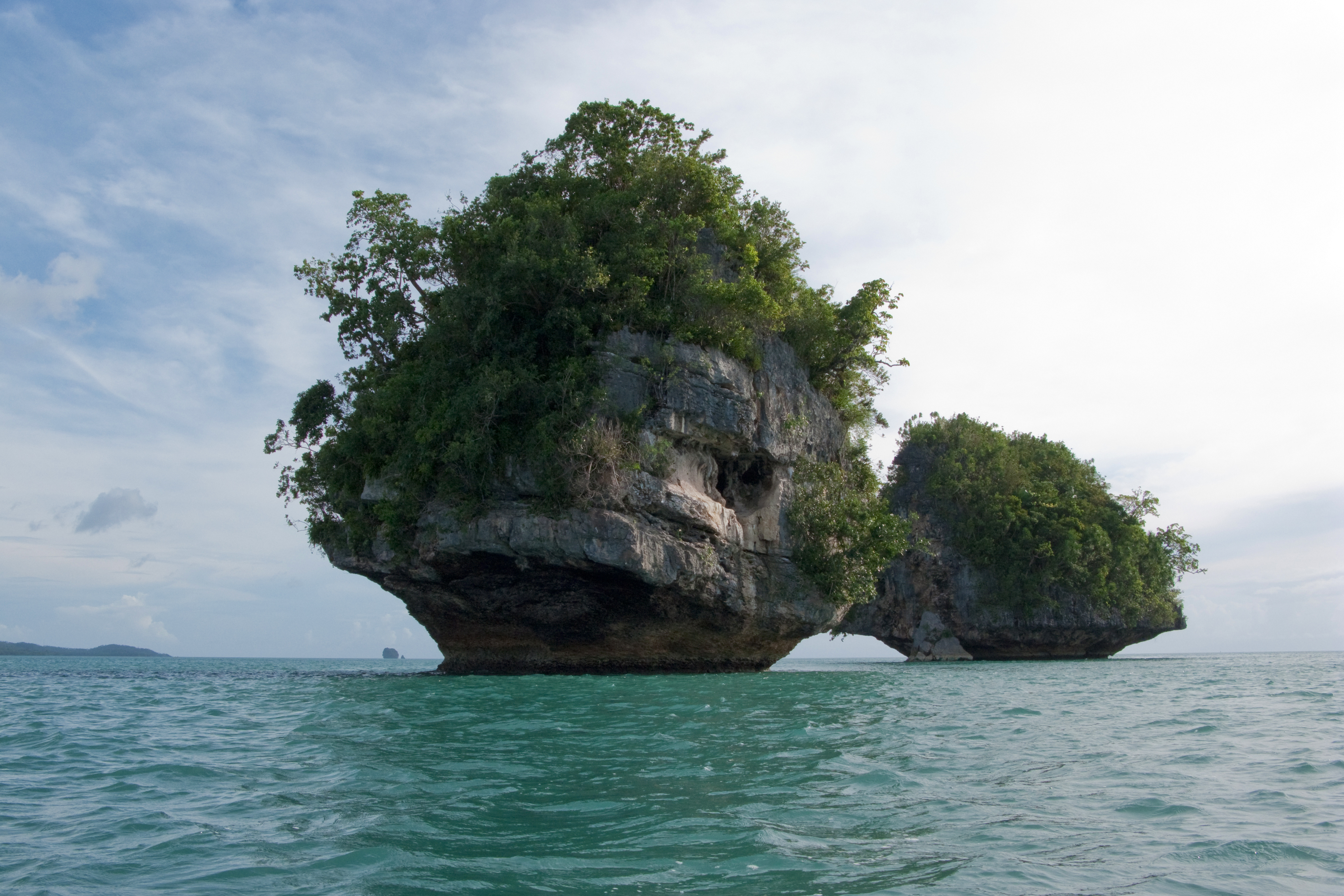
- Limestone rock formations off the coast of Marabut

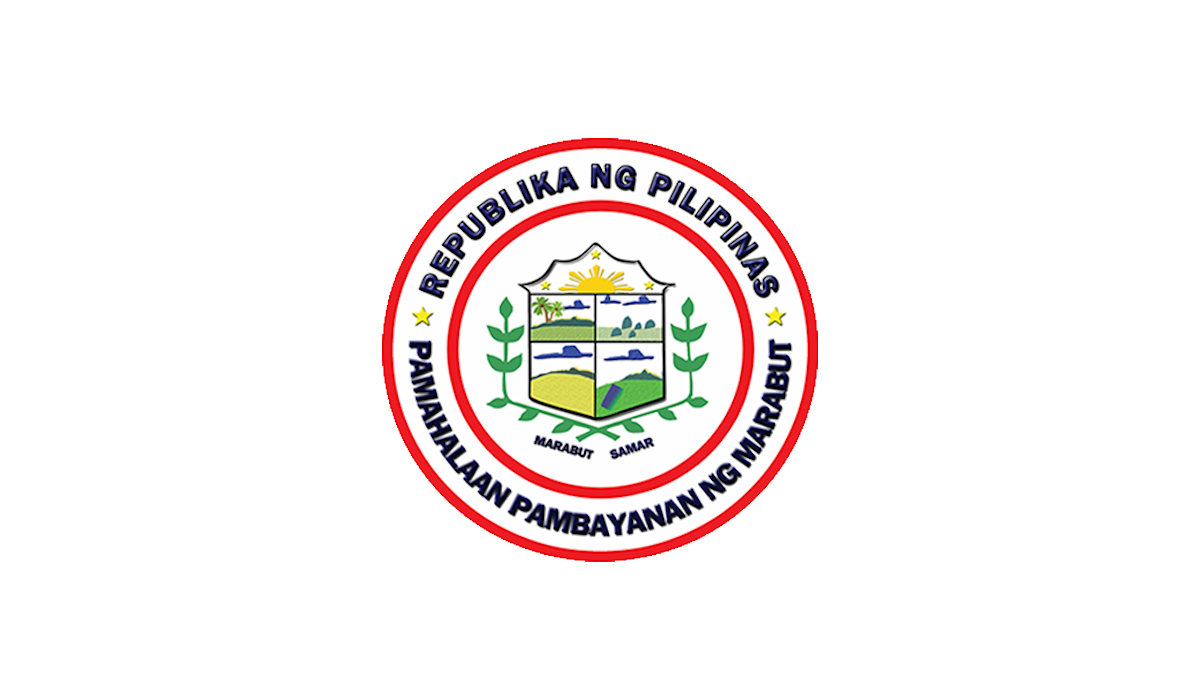
- Flag

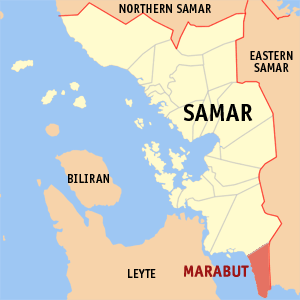
- Map of Samar with Marabut highlighted
- Interactive map of Marabut
- Location within the Philippines
- Coordinates: 11°06′25″N 125°12′43″E
- Country: Philippines
- Region: Eastern Visayas
- Province: Samar
- District: 2nd district
- Founded: July 22, 1949
- Barangays: 24 (see Barangays)

Government
  - Type: Sangguniang Bayan
  - Mayor: Percival A. Ortillo Jr.
  - Vice Mayor: Judith O. Marks
  - Representative: Reynolds Michael Tan
  - Councilors: List: • Gilbert G. Bocar; • Ma. Judith O. Marks; • Ruben A. Alonzo; • Fidela P. Tiozon; • Adela G. Agua; • Benedicto A. Daga; • Virgilio G. Beringuel; • Crisanto G. Torbeles Jr.; DILG Masterlist of Officials
  - Electorate: 13,556 voters (2025)

Area
  - Total: 143.55 km^{2} (55.42 sq mi)
- Elevation: 36 m (118 ft)
- Highest elevation: 310 m (1,020 ft)
- Lowest elevation: 0 m (0 ft)

Population (2024 census)
  - Total: 18,168
  - Density: 126.56/km^{2} (327.79/sq mi)
  - Households: 4,425

Economy
  - Income class: 4th municipal income class
  - Poverty incidence: 32.1% (2023)
  - Revenue: ₱ 15.89 million (2024)
  - Assets: ₱ 53.83 million (2024)
  - Expenditure: ₱ 15.16 million (2024)
  - Liabilities: ₱ 47.17 million (2024)

Service provider
  - Electricity: Samar 2 Electric Cooperative (SAMELCO 2)
- Time zone: UTC+8 (PST)
- ZIP code: 6721
- PSGC: 0806010000
- IDD : area code: +63 (0)55
- Native languages: Waray; Tagalog

Marabut, officially the Municipality of Marabut (Waray: Bungto han Marabut; Tagalog: Bayan ng Marabut), is a coastal municipality in the province of Samar, Philippines.

== History ==
Before the construction of the Mabaysay Church (now known as Basey Church) in 1846, the area was inhabited by the Umhanan people, also referred to as the Tinawagan people.

In 1868, some settlers moved toward the shoreline, while others remained inland to avoid forced labor by the Guardia Civil during the church's construction. After the Balangiga massacre on September 28, 1901, additional settlers from Balangiga migrated inland to escape fears of American retaliation, increasing the local population.

During the Spanish period, Ysidro Ferreras encouraged Engracio Amantillo and Mauricio Amantillo to change the name from Umhanan to Tinawagan, and later to Sitio Lipata, in reference to the abundance of Lipata trees in the area. Local accounts stated that Bicario Amantillo organized residents for community protection during the revolutionary period, and leadership later passed on to Ysidro Ferreras.

Under American rule, the population of Sitio Lipata grew significantly. Under Ysidro's leadership, residents once considered relocating to Hilaba (with its larger area and a hill suitable for a church), but the plan was abandoned due to problems with shoreline access at low tides.

Ysidro Ferreras later transformed Sitio Lipata into Barrio Santo Niño of Basey, Samar. Ysidro Ferreras served as Mayor of Basey, Engracio Amantillo as Vice Mayor, and Mauricio Amantillo as Cabeza del Barrio Santo Niño. During World War II elementary education in Barrio Santo Niño was suspended until the liberation of Samar in 1944.

In early 1949, Ysidro Ferreras submitted a proposal to President Elpidio Quirino to convert Barrio Santo Niño into a municipality. On July 22, 1949, Executive Order No. 247 was signed, creating the Municipality of Marabut, named in honor of Congressman Serafin Marabut of Basey, Samar. Ysidro Ferreras became the municipality's first mayor, and Engracio Amantillo the first vice mayor.

Under the original organization, Marabut included 14 barangays: San Roque, Tag-Alag, Legaspi, Caluayan, Tinabanan, Osmeña, Canyoyo, Binocyahan, Odoc, Pinana-an, Santo Niño (Poblacion), Lipata, Amambucale, and Pinamitinan.

During the administration of Mayor Macario Ferreras, Poblacion Marabut was subdivided into four barangays: Amantillo, Sto. Niño, Catato, and Lipata. Other barangays were similarly divided (Pinamitinan into Sta. Rita, Malobago; Odoc into Ferreras; Binocyahan into Logero; Osmeña into Mabuhay, Roño, Panan-awan, etc.; Legaspi into Veloso), resulting in the present total of 24 barangays.

== Geography ==
=== Barangays ===
The municipality of Marabut is politically subdivided into 24 barangays, each consisting of Puroks, with some also containing Sitios.

In 1957, the sitio of Pinana-an was converted into the barrio Pinalangga.

- Amambucale
- Caluwayan
- Canyoyo
- Ferreras
- Legaspi
- Logero
- Osmeña
- Pinalanga
- Pinamitinan
- Catato (Poblacion)
- San Roque (formerly sitio Cabugao)
- Santo Niño (Poblacion)
- Tagalag
- Tinabanan
- Amantillo (Poblacion)
- Binukyahan
- Lipata (Poblacion)
- Mabuhay
- Malobago
- Odoc
- Panan-awan
- Roño
- Santa Rita
- Veloso

=== Climate ===
Marabut has a tropical rainforest climate, characterized by high humidity, warm temperatures, and significant rainfall throughout the year. The wettest month is December, and the driest month is April.

Climate data for Marabut, Samar
Month	Jan	Feb	Mar	Apr	May	Jun	Jul	Aug	Sep	Oct	Nov	Dec	Year
Mean daily maximum °C (°F)	28 (82)	29 (84)	29 (84)	31 (88)	31 (88)	30 (86)	29 (84)	29 (84)	29 (84)	29 (84)	29 (84)	28 (82)	29 (85)
Mean daily minimum °C (°F)	21 (70)	21 (70)	21 (70)	22 (72)	24 (75)	24 (75)	24 (75)	25 (77)	24 (75)	24 (75)	23 (73)	22 (72)	23 (73)
Average precipitation mm (inches)	72 (2.8)	52 (2.0)	65 (2.6)	62 (2.4)	87 (3.4)	129 (5.1)	153 (6.0)	124 (4.9)	147 (5.8)	157 (6.2)	139 (5.5)	117 (4.6)	1,304 (51.3)
Average rainy days	17.4	13.4	16.8	18.0	22.0	25.3	26.2	24.2	24.9	26.0	23.3	20.8	258.3
Source: Meteoblue

== Demographics ==
Population census of Marabut
Year	Pop.	±% p.a.
1960	7,662	—
1970	10,167	+2.87%
1975	11,892	+3.19%
1980	13,288	+2.24%
1990	10,543	−2.29%
1995	10,355	−0.34%
2000	12,335	+3.82%
2007	13,745	+1.50%
2010	15,115	+3.52%
2015	16,962	+2.22%
2020	17,842	+1.07%
2024	18,168	+0.44%
Source: Philippine Statistics Authority

According to the 2024 Philippine census, the population of Marabut was 18,168 people, with a density of 130 inhabitants per square kilometre or 340 inhabitants per square mile.

== Economy ==
Poverty incidence of Marabut (%)

Source: Philippine Statistics Authority

The economy of Marabut is primarily based on agriculture. According to data in 2022, there was a gradual increase in local tourism, primarily due to the local beaches and rock formations.
