= San Jose de Buan =

Municipality in Samar, Philippines

- Municipality
- Municipality of San Jose de Buan
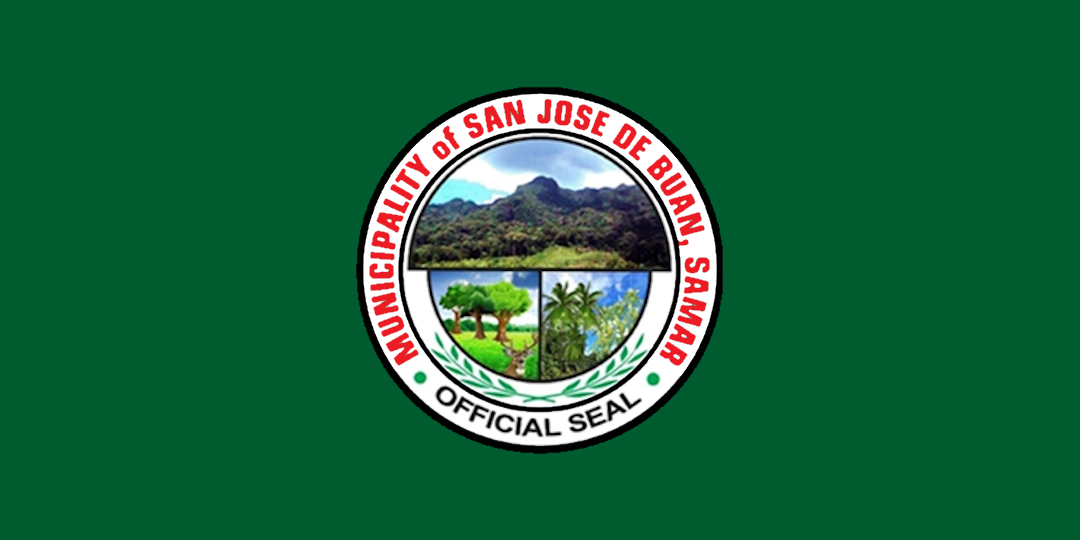
- Flag
- Nickname: Heart of Samar Island
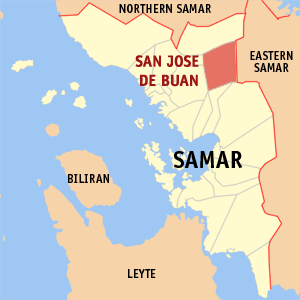
- Map of Samar with San Jose de Buan highlighted
- Interactive map of San Jose de Buan
- Location within the Philippines
- Coordinates: 12°03′18″N 125°01′38″E
- Country: Philippines
- Region: Eastern Visayas
- Province: Samar
- District: 2nd district
- Founded: June 21, 1969 (as municipality)
- Named for: Saint Joseph
- Barangays: 14 (see Barangays)

Government
  - Type: Sangguniang Bayan
  - Mayor: Joaquin R. Elizalde
  - Vice Mayor: Wilson F. Orcino
  - Representative: Reynolds Michael Tan
  - Councilors: List: • Dominic P. Dapapao; • Rene L. Rebato; • Lolita B. Pomaretos; • Leo M. Pomarca; • Paquito L. Oblino; • Joel J. Labong; • Nancy F. Tiopes; • Joel D. Obinguar; DILG Masterlist of Officials
  - Electorate: 6,109 voters (2025)

Area
  - Total: 366.90 km^{2} (141.66 sq mi)
- Elevation: 304 m (997 ft)
- Highest elevation: 815 m (2,674 ft)
- Lowest elevation: 121 m (397 ft)

Population (2024 census)
  - Total: 7,939
  - Density: 21.64/km^{2} (56.04/sq mi)
  - Households: 1,675

Economy
  - Income class: 3rd municipal income class
  - Poverty incidence: 38.06% (2023)
  - Revenue: ₱ 168.5 million (2024)
  - Assets: ₱ 557.2 million (2024)
  - Expenditure: ₱ 144.8 million (2024)
  - Liabilities: ₱ 153.9 million (2024)

Service provider
  - Electricity: Samar 2 Electric Cooperative (SAMELCO 2)
- Time zone: UTC+8 (PST)
- ZIP code: 6714
- PSGC: 0806014000
- IDD : area code: +63 (0)55
- Native languages: Waray; Tagalog

San Jose de Buan, officially the Municipality of San Jose de Buan (Waray: Bungto han San Jose de Buan; Tagalog: Bayan ng San Jose de Buan), is a municipality in the province of Samar, Philippines. According to the 2024 census, it has a population of 7,939 people.

San Jose de Buan was a municipal district of Gandara from 1948 to 1969, when it was converted into a municipality.

== Geography ==
San Jose de Buan is an elevated municipality due to is location on the Huraw Mountain Ranges.

=== Barangays ===
San Jose de Buan is politically subdivided into 14 barangays. Each barangay consists of puroks and some have sitios.

- Aguingayan
- Babaclayon
- Can-aponte
- Cataydongan
- Gusa
- Hagbay
- Hiduroma
- Hilumot
- Barangay 1 (Poblacion)
- Barangay 2 (Poblacion)
- Barangay 3 (Poblacion)
- Barangay 4 (Poblacion)
- San Nicolas
- Hibaca-an

=== Climate ===
Climate data for San Jose de Buan, Samar
| Month | Jan | Feb | Mar | Apr | May | Jun | Jul | Aug | Sep | Oct | Nov | Dec | Year |
|---|---|---|---|---|---|---|---|---|---|---|---|---|---|
| Mean daily maximum °C (°F) | 26 (79) | 27 (81) | 27 (81) | 29 (84) | 29 (84) | 29 (84) | 28 (82) | 29 (84) | 28 (82) | 28 (82) | 28 (82) | 27 (81) | 28 (82) |
| Mean daily minimum °C (°F) | 21 (70) | 21 (70) | 21 (70) | 22 (72) | 23 (73) | 23 (73) | 23 (73) | 23 (73) | 23 (73) | 23 (73) | 22 (72) | 22 (72) | 22 (72) |
| Average precipitation mm (inches) | 97 (3.8) | 64 (2.5) | 69 (2.7) | 58 (2.3) | 98 (3.9) | 161 (6.3) | 167 (6.6) | 140 (5.5) | 158 (6.2) | 171 (6.7) | 169 (6.7) | 154 (6.1) | 1,506 (59.3) |
| Average rainy days | 17.1 | 13.4 | 14.8 | 15.2 | 21.1 | 25.2 | 26.8 | 25.4 | 25.5 | 26.5 | 23.0 | 20.3 | 254.3 |
Source: Meteoblue

== Demographics ==
Population census of San Jose de Buan
| Year | Pop. | ±% p.a. |
|---|---|---|
| 1918 | 382 | — |
| 1939 | 633 | +2.43% |
| 1948 | 646 | +0.23% |
| 1960 | 1,372 | +6.48% |
| 1970 | 2,530 | +6.30% |
| 1975 | 3,250 | +5.15% |
| 1980 | 5,455 | +10.91% |
| 1990 | 4,217 | −2.54% |
| 1995 | 5,471 | +5.00% |
| 2000 | 6,438 | +3.55% |
| 2007 | 6,814 | +0.79% |
| 2010 | 6,563 | −1.36% |
| 2015 | 7,769 | +3.26% |
| 2020 | 7,767 | −0.01% |
| 2024 | 7,939 | +0.53% |
Source: Philippine Statistics Authority

== Economy ==
Poverty incidence of San Jose de Buan (%)

Source: Philippine Statistics Authority
