= Talalora =

Municipality in Samar, Philippines

- Municipality
- Municipality of Talalora
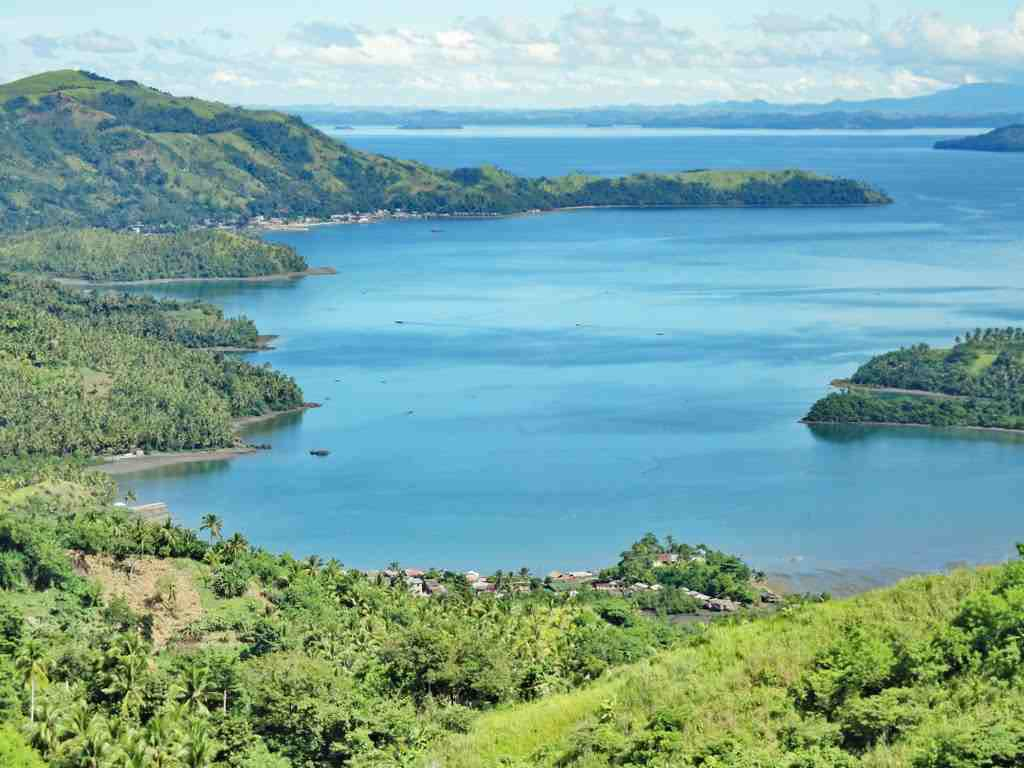
- Mountain-top view of Talalora

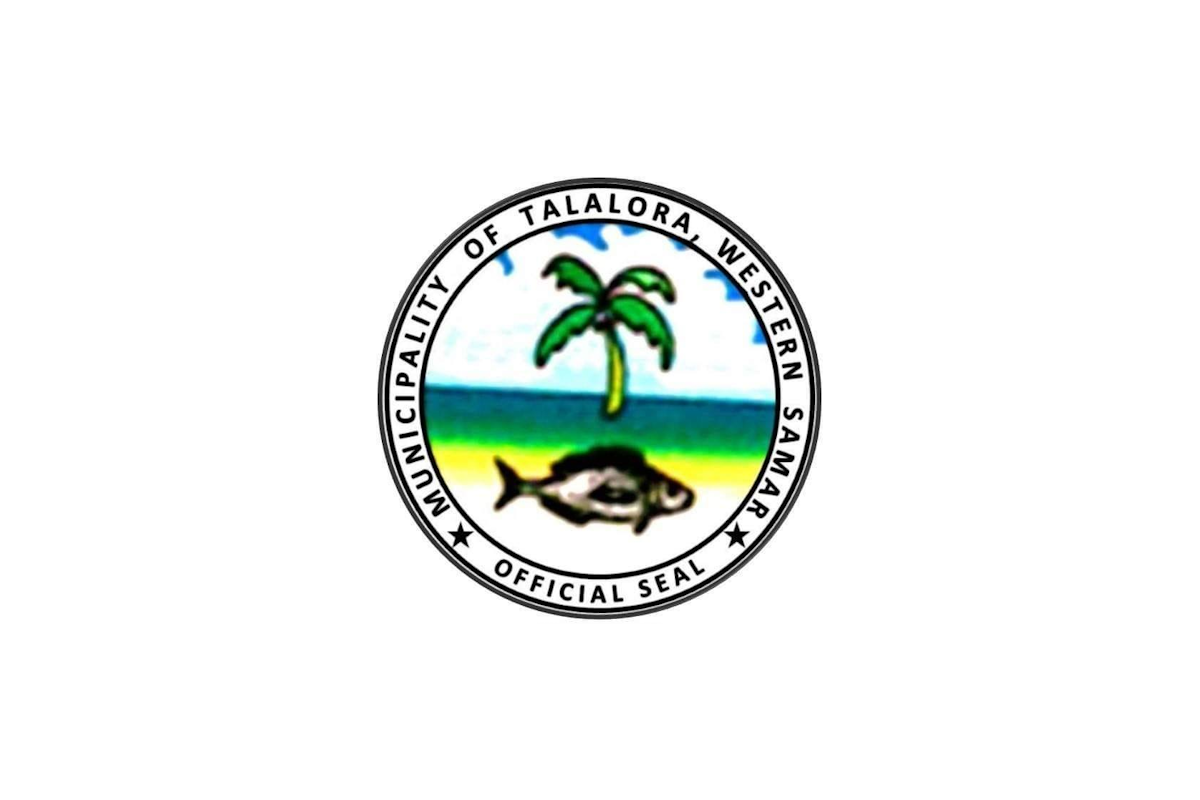
- Flag

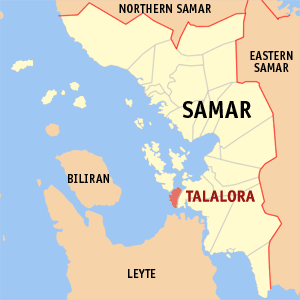
- Map of Samar with Talalora highlighted
- Interactive map of Talalora
- Location within the Philippines
- Coordinates: 11°31′52″N 124°50′08″E
- Country: Philippines
- Region: Eastern Visayas
- Province: Samar
- District: 2nd district
- Barangays: 11 (see Barangays)

Government
  - Type: Sangguniang Bayan
  - Mayor: Rosabel O. Costelo
  - Vice Mayor: Leonilo T. Costelo
  - Representative: Reynolds Michael Tan
  - Electorate: 6,987 voters (2025)

Area
  - Total: 27.96 km^{2} (10.80 sq mi)
- Elevation: 38 m (125 ft)

Population (2024 census)
  - Total: 8,530
  - Density: 305/km^{2} (790/sq mi)
  - Households: 1,861

Economy
  - Income class: 5th municipal income class
  - Poverty incidence: 34.77% (2023)
  - Revenue: ₱ 76.4 million (2024)
  - Assets: ₱ 285.8 million (2024)
  - Expenditure: ₱ 63.11 million (2024)
  - Liabilities: ₱ 96.98 million (2024)

Service provider
  - Electricity: Samar 2 Electric Cooperative (SAMELCO 2)
- Time zone: UTC+8 (PST)
- ZIP code: 6704
- PSGC: 0806019000
- IDD : area code: +63 (0)55
- Native languages: Waray; Tagalog

Talalora, officially the Municipality of Talalora (Waray: Bungto han Talalora; Tagalog: Bayan ng Talalora), is a municipality in the province of Samar, Philippines. According to the 2024 census, it has a population of 8,530 people.

Talalora was created from the barrios of Mallorga, Tulac, Talalora, Tatabonan, Navatas, and Navatas Guti of the town of Villareal, by virtue of Republic Act No. 192, on June 22, 1947.

== Geography ==
=== Barangays ===
Talalora is politically subdivided into 11 barangays. Each barangay consists of puroks and some have sitios.

- Brgy. Independencia
- Malaguining
- Mallorga
- Navatas Daku
- Navatas Guti
- Placer
- Poblacion Barangay I
- Poblacion Barangay II
- San Juan
- Tatabunan
- Victory

=== Climate ===
Climate data for Talalora, Samar
| Month | Jan | Feb | Mar | Apr | May | Jun | Jul | Aug | Sep | Oct | Nov | Dec | Year |
|---|---|---|---|---|---|---|---|---|---|---|---|---|---|
| Mean daily maximum °C (°F) | 28 (82) | 29 (84) | 29 (84) | 31 (88) | 31 (88) | 30 (86) | 30 (86) | 30 (86) | 30 (86) | 29 (84) | 29 (84) | 29 (84) | 30 (85) |
| Mean daily minimum °C (°F) | 22 (72) | 22 (72) | 22 (72) | 23 (73) | 24 (75) | 25 (77) | 25 (77) | 25 (77) | 25 (77) | 24 (75) | 24 (75) | 23 (73) | 24 (75) |
| Average precipitation mm (inches) | 73 (2.9) | 56 (2.2) | 75 (3.0) | 71 (2.8) | 114 (4.5) | 174 (6.9) | 172 (6.8) | 163 (6.4) | 167 (6.6) | 161 (6.3) | 158 (6.2) | 125 (4.9) | 1,509 (59.5) |
| Average rainy days | 15.2 | 12.5 | 16.2 | 17.3 | 23.9 | 27.3 | 28.4 | 26.9 | 26.9 | 27.1 | 23.8 | 19.3 | 264.8 |
Source: Meteoblue

== Demographics ==
Population census of Talalora
| Year | Pop. | ±% p.a. |
|---|---|---|
| 1948 | 6,031 | — |
| 1960 | 5,830 | −0.28% |
| 1970 | 6,639 | +1.31% |
| 1975 | 6,873 | +0.70% |
| 1980 | 6,332 | −1.63% |
| 1990 | 6,112 | −0.35% |
| 1995 | 6,565 | +1.35% |
| 2000 | 6,580 | +0.05% |
| 2007 | 7,535 | +1.89% |
| 2010 | 7,983 | +2.12% |
| 2015 | 8,057 | +0.18% |
| 2020 | 7,856 | −0.53% |
| 2024 | 8,530 | +2.00% |
Source: Philippine Statistics Authority

== Economy ==
Poverty incidence of Talalora (%)

Source: Philippine Statistics Authority
