= Villareal, Samar =

Municipality in Samar, Philippines

Villareal
- Municipality
- Municipality of Villareal
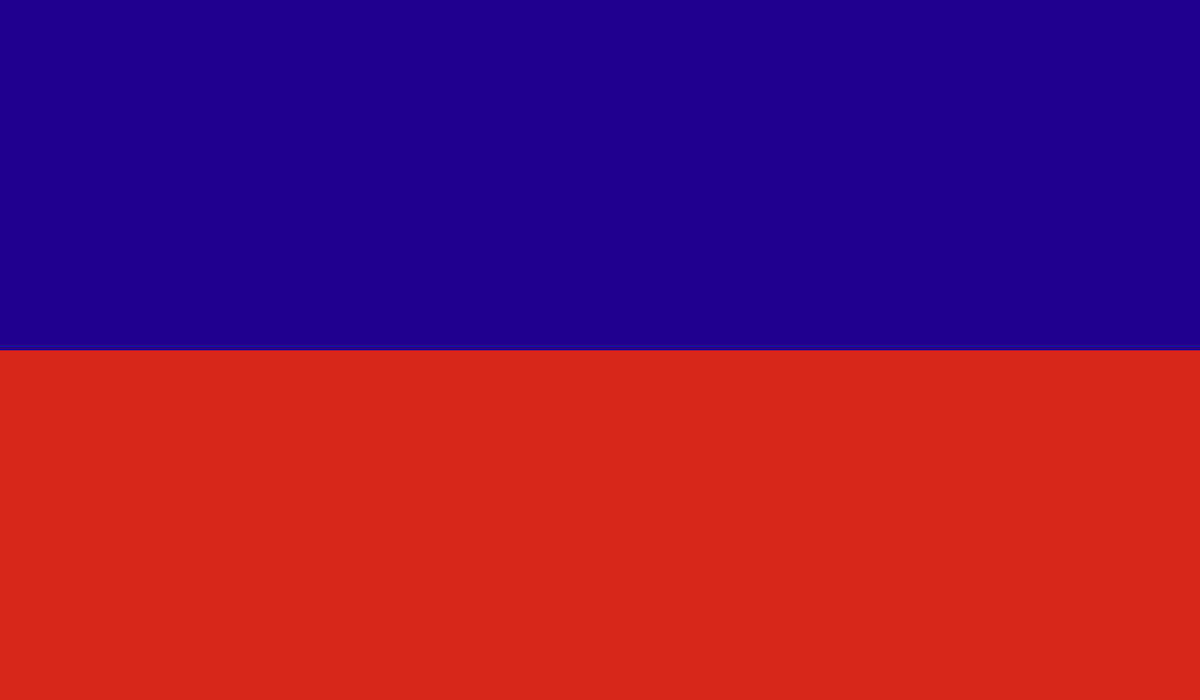
- Flag

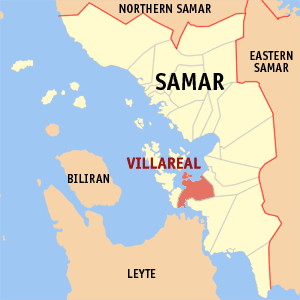
- Map of Samar with Villareal highlighted
- Interactive map of Villareal
- Location within the Philippines
- Coordinates: 11°34′N 124°56′E
- Country: Philippines
- Region: Eastern Visayas
- Province: Samar
- District: 2nd district
- Barangays: 38 (see Barangays)

Government
  - Type: Sangguniang Bayan
  - Mayor: Carlo R. Latorre
  - Vice Mayor: Avelino A. Lababo
  - Representative: Reynolds Michael Tan
  - Electorate: 21,480 voters (2025)

Area
  - Total: 98.54 km^{2} (38.05 sq mi)
- Elevation: 18 m (59 ft)
- Highest elevation: 121 m (397 ft)
- Lowest elevation: 0 m (0 ft)

Population (2024 census)
  - Total: 27,909
  - Density: 283.2/km^{2} (733.5/sq mi)
  - Households: 6,242

Economy
  - Income class: 3rd municipal income class
  - Poverty incidence: 34.52% (2023)
  - Revenue: ₱ 188.1 million (2024)
  - Assets: ₱ 546.7 million (2024)
  - Expenditure: ₱ 152.7 million (2024)
  - Liabilities: ₱ 246.5 million (2024)

Service provider
  - Electricity: Samar 2 Electric Cooperative (SAMELCO 2)
- Time zone: UTC+8 (PST)
- ZIP code: 6717
- PSGC: 0806021000
- IDD : area code: +63 (0)55
- Native languages: Waray; Tagalog
- Website: www.villarealsamar.com

Villareal, officially the Municipality of Villareal (Waray: Bungto han Villareal; Tagalog: Bayan ng Villareal), is a municipality in the province of Samar, Philippines. According to the 2024 census, it has a population of 27,909 people.

== History ==
What was called Umauas existed in 1768 as a pueblo and parish, however, often sharing the priest with Calbiga, where it became its visita by early 19th century. In 1863, it became a separate entity with its name being changed to Villareal.

Villareal was among the pueblos where the Dios-dios movement, forerunner of the Pulahanism and had been accused by the church authorities of subversion, had their followers. There were reports on their existence in the area by 1870s, at the time subversive activities in the Samar island were being investigated by the Spanish authorities, and 1880s. In the 1870s, four individuals were deported for their activities and secret alliance with Leon Petac, a member of the movement.

During the American occupation, the still-undivided Samar was reorganized, so as Villareal. In 1903, part of the then-dissolved municipality of Santa Rita (on the right bank of the Silanga River) was annexed into it (the rest was annexed into Calbayog and Basey); as the jurisdiction of barrio Iquiran was transferred to Zumarraga. In 1906, the re-establishment of Santa Rita resulted to Villareal and Basey losing their territories.

In early 2005, residents, aided by the municipal government, initiated the construction of eight-kilometer cemented road, which would link the town to the rest of the province, through the "Villareal Bayanihan Road Project"—the country's first of its kind. The dirt road, which covers seven barangays, remained unchanged since its opening in 1937. The materials were bought from money raised by natives, and the construction reportedly cost less than ₱10 million, compared to about ₱80 million—the supposed cost by the Department of Public Works and Highways. By late 2010, majority of the road project has been finished.

== Geography ==
=== Barangays ===
Villareal is politically subdivided into 38 barangays. Each barangay consists of puroks and some have sitios.

- Banquil
- Bino-ongan
- Burabod
- Cambaguio
- Canmucat
- Villarosa Pob. (Campiatot)
- Conant
- Guintarcan
- Himyangan
- Igot
- Inarumbacan
- Inasudlan
- Lam-awan
- Lamingao
- Lawa-an
- Macopa
- Mahayag
- Malonoy
- Mercado (Poblacion)
- Miramar (Poblacion)
- Nagcaduha
- Pacao
- Pacoyoy
- Pangpang
- Plaridel
- Central (Poblacion)
- Polangi
- San Andres
- San Fernando
- San Rafael (Buaya)
- San Roque
- Santa Rosa
- Santo Niño
- Soledad (Poblacion)
- Tayud (Poblacion)
- Tomabe
- Ulayan
- Patag

=== Climate ===
Climate data for Villareal, Samar
Month	Jan	Feb	Mar	Apr	May	Jun	Jul	Aug	Sep	Oct	Nov	Dec	Year
Mean daily maximum °C (°F)	27 (81)	28 (82)	28 (82)	30 (86)	30 (86)	30 (86)	29 (84)	29 (84)	29 (84)	29 (84)	28 (82)	28 (82)	29 (84)
Mean daily minimum °C (°F)	22 (72)	22 (72)	22 (72)	23 (73)	24 (75)	24 (75)	24 (75)	24 (75)	24 (75)	24 (75)	23 (73)	23 (73)	23 (74)
Average precipitation mm (inches)	114 (4.5)	81 (3.2)	94 (3.7)	81 (3.2)	119 (4.7)	192 (7.6)	186 (7.3)	158 (6.2)	167 (6.6)	185 (7.3)	202 (8.0)	176 (6.9)	1,755 (69.2)
Average rainy days	18.6	14.7	16.8	17.8	22.3	25.9	27.5	26.2	26.6	27.0	24.6	22.3	270.3
Source: Meteoblue

== Demographics ==
Population census of Villareal
Year	Pop.	±% p.a.
1903	7,087	—
1918	10,323	+2.54%
1939	13,807	+1.39%
1948	15,094	+1.00%
1960	18,271	+1.60%
1970	18,938	+0.36%
1975	20,339	+1.44%
1980	20,505	+0.16%
1990	21,820	+0.62%
1995	22,390	+0.48%
2000	23,604	+1.14%
2007	25,135	+0.87%
2010	26,221	+1.55%
2015	28,230	+1.42%
2020	27,394	−0.63%
2024	27,909	+0.45%
Source: Philippine Statistics Authority

== Economy ==
Poverty incidence of Villareal (%)

Source: Philippine Statistics Authority

== People from Villareal ==
- Rudy Romano
