= San Sebastian, Samar =

Municipality in Samar, Philippines

San Sebastian
- Municipality
- Municipality of San Sebastian
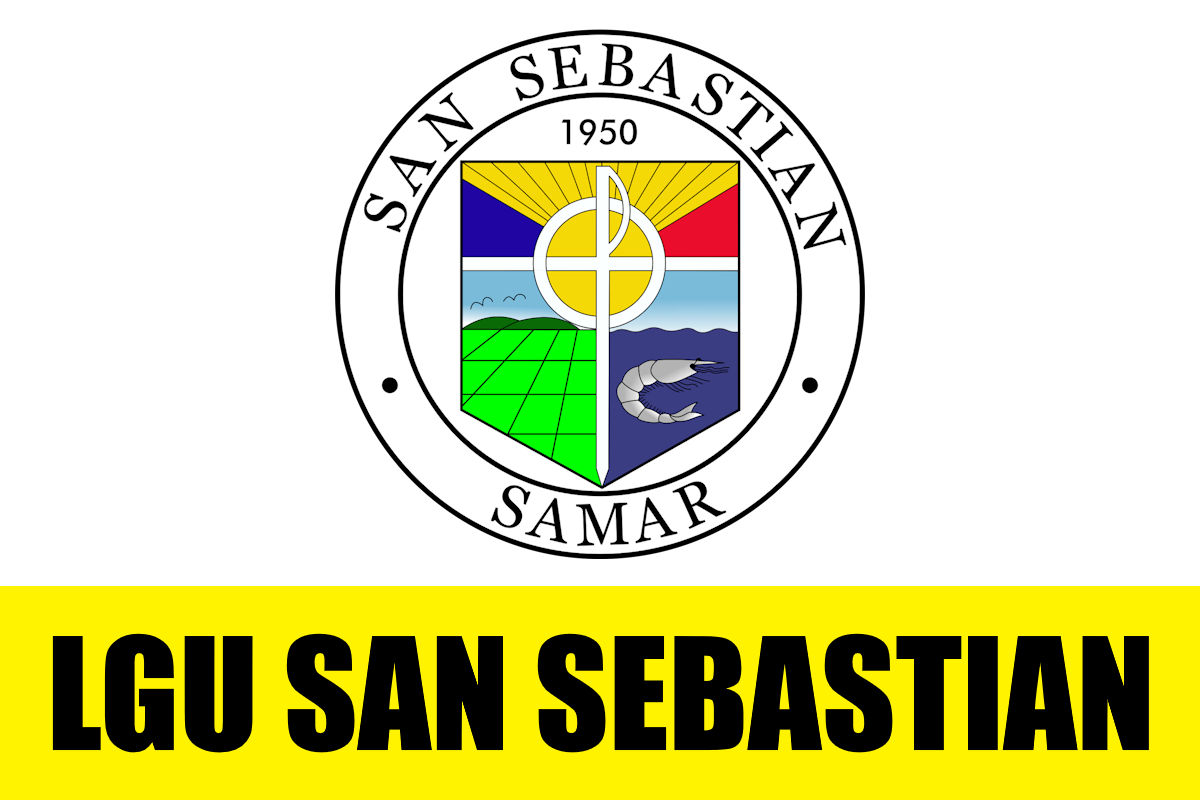
- Flag Seal

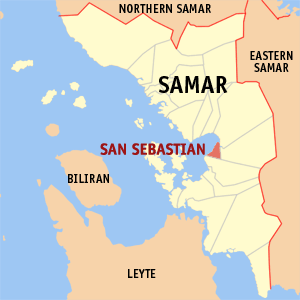
- Map of Samar with San Sebastian highlighted
- Interactive map of San Sebastian
- Location within the Philippines
- Coordinates: 11°42′N 125°01′E
- Country: Philippines
- Region: Eastern Visayas
- Province: Samar
- District: 2nd district
- Named for: San Sebastián, Spain
- Barangays: 14 (see Barangays)

Government
  - Type: Sangguniang Bayan
  - Mayor: Endi Gaviola
  - Vice Mayor: Laleine N. Babon
  - Representative: Reynolds Michael Tan
  - Councilors: List: • Rebecca S. Mabulay; • Laleine N. Babon; • Marites B. Saria; • Nila B. Halog; • Elizabeth B. Cerdeña; • Leonilo M. Cabutin; • April Joy A. Operario; • Danico G. delos Reyes; DILG Masterlist of Officials
  - Electorate: 7,746 voters (2025)

Area
  - Total: 39.07 km^{2} (15.09 sq mi)
- Elevation: 8.0 m (26.2 ft)
- Highest elevation: 187 m (614 ft)
- Lowest elevation: 0 m (0 ft)

Population (2024 census)
  - Total: 9,110
  - Density: 233/km^{2} (604/sq mi)
  - Households: 1,968

Economy
  - Income class: 5th municipal income class
  - Poverty incidence: 32.34% (2023)
  - Revenue: ₱ 98.46 million (2024)
  - Assets: ₱ 274.1 million (2024)
  - Expenditure: ₱ 92.78 million (2024)
  - Liabilities: ₱ 58.15 million (2024)

Service provider
  - Electricity: Samar 2 Electric Cooperative (SAMELCO 2)
- Time zone: UTC+8 (PST)
- ZIP code: 6709
- PSGC: 0806015000
- IDD : area code: +63 (0)55
- Native languages: Waray; Tagalog

San Sebastian, officially the Municipality of San Sebastian (Waray: Bungto han San Sebastian; Tagalog: Bayan ng San Sebastian), is a municipality in the province of Samar, Philippines. According to the 2024 census, it has a population of 9,110 people.

San Sebastian was absorbed into the town of Wright (Paranas) during the American occupation. In 1950, the neighborhoods of San Sebastian, Jitaasan, Dolores, Camanjagay, Bontod, Campidasa, Campiyak, Maslog, Balogo, Maropangpang, Binongtoan, and Bolwan were combined and re-established as a single town.

== History ==
The town of San Sebastian was known before as "Balugo," (the original and ancient name) considering that it was situated at the mouth of Balugo River. Balugo was a visita and it was annexed to Paranas. It was later renamed San Sebastian by Fray Domingo Ruiz, O.F.M. after his birthplace (a coastal city in Spain) who was then assigned in Balugo. Fr. Ruiz made initial efforts and recommendations that San Sebastian from its status as visita should be elevated and made into pueblo under the spiritual care of the cura paroco of Catbalogan.

Between 1894 and 1895, San Sebastian was given the status as pueblo and an independent parish separated from its mother town, Paranas. During the outbreak of the Philippine Revolution, San Sebastian was again affixed as a barrio of Paranas. Later with the enactment of Republic Act No. 543 by the Philippine Congress once again San Sebastian became an independent municipality.

== Geography ==
=== Barangays ===
San Sebastian is politically subdivided into 14 barangays. Each barangay consists of puroks and some have sitios.

- Poblacion Barangay 1
- Poblacion Barangay 2
- Poblacion Barangay 3
- Poblacion Barangay 4
- Balogo
- Bontod
- Camanhagay
- Campiyak
- Dolores
- Hita-asan I
- Inobongan
- Cabaywa
- Canduyucan
- Hita-asan II

=== Climate ===
Climate data for San Sebastian, Samar
Month	Jan	Feb	Mar	Apr	May	Jun	Jul	Aug	Sep	Oct	Nov	Dec	Year
Mean daily maximum °C (°F)	27 (81)	28 (82)	28 (82)	30 (86)	30 (86)	30 (86)	29 (84)	29 (84)	29 (84)	29 (84)	28 (82)	28 (82)	29 (84)
Mean daily minimum °C (°F)	22 (72)	22 (72)	22 (72)	23 (73)	24 (75)	24 (75)	24 (75)	24 (75)	24 (75)	24 (75)	23 (73)	23 (73)	23 (74)
Average precipitation mm (inches)	114 (4.5)	81 (3.2)	94 (3.7)	81 (3.2)	119 (4.7)	192 (7.6)	186 (7.3)	158 (6.2)	167 (6.6)	185 (7.3)	202 (8.0)	176 (6.9)	1,755 (69.2)
Average rainy days	18.6	14.7	16.8	17.8	22.3	25.9	27.5	26.2	26.6	27.0	24.6	22.3	270.3
Source: Meteoblue

== Demographics ==
Population census of San Sebastian
Year	Pop.	±% p.a.
1903	2,767	—
1960	3,645	+0.48%
1970	4,267	+1.59%
1975	4,441	+0.80%
1980	4,606	+0.73%
1990	5,732	+2.21%
1995	6,381	+2.03%
2000	6,779	+1.31%
2007	7,365	+1.15%
2010	7,708	+1.67%
2015	8,057	+0.85%
2020	8,704	+1.64%
2024	9,110	+1.10%
Source: Philippine Statistics Authority

== Economy ==
Poverty incidence of San Sebastian (%)

Source: Philippine Statistics Authority
