= Motiong =

Municipality in Samar, Philippines

- Municipality
- Municipality of Motiong
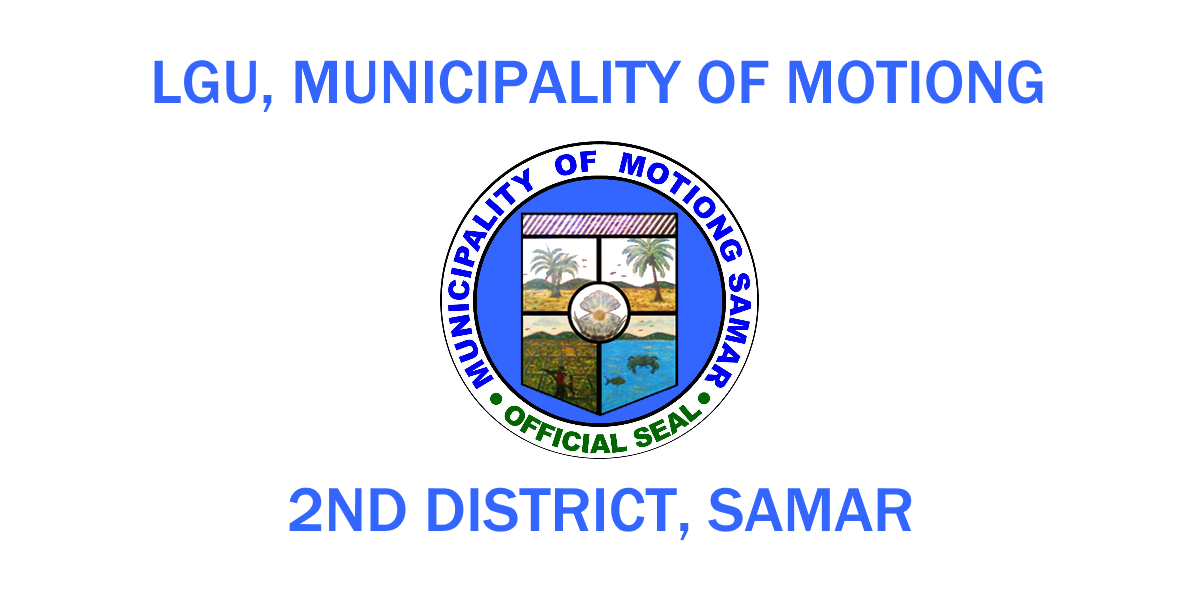
- Flag
- Etymology: Mutya
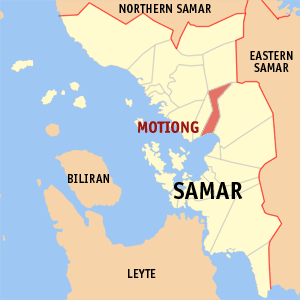
- Map of Samar with Motiong highlighted
- Interactive map of Motiong
- Location within the Philippines
- Coordinates: 11°47′N 125°00′E
- Country: Philippines
- Region: Eastern Visayas
- Province: Samar
- District: 2nd district
- Founded: 1948
- Barangays: 30 (see Barangays)

Government
  - Type: Sangguniang Bayan
  - Mayor: Renato T. Cabael
  - Vice Mayor: Imelda U. Bacay
  - Representative: Reynolds Michael Tan
  - Councilors: List: • Marlon C. Babatio; • Rosauro C. Acaban; • Neil D. Ygrubay; • Marina A. Babatio; • Erodito A. Cabubas; • Agustin T. Ramos; • Francisco M. Langi; • Aldwin L. Langi; DILG Masterlist of Officials
  - Electorate: 12,064 voters (2025)

Area
  - Total: 174.40 km^{2} (67.34 sq mi)
- Elevation: 47 m (154 ft)
- Highest elevation: 332 m (1,089 ft)
- Lowest elevation: 0 m (0 ft)

Population (2024 census)
  - Total: 15,887
  - Density: 91.095/km^{2} (235.94/sq mi)
  - Households: 3,591

Economy
  - Income class: 4th municipal income class
  - Poverty incidence: 30.82% (2023)
  - Revenue: ₱ 165.1 million (2024)
  - Assets: ₱ 380 million (2024)
  - Expenditure: ₱ 165 million (2024)
  - Liabilities: ₱ 83.9 million (2024)

Service provider
  - Electricity: Samar 2 Electric Cooperative (SAMELCO 2)
- Time zone: UTC+8 (PST)
- ZIP code: 6702
- PSGC: 0806012000
- IDD : area code: +63 (0)55
- Native languages: Waray; Tagalog

Motiong, officially the Municipality of Motiong (Waray: Bungto han Motiong; Tagalog: Bayan ng Motiong), is a municipality in the province of Samar, Philippines. According to the 2024 census, it has a population of 15,887 people.

== History ==
Long before the coming of the Americans, there were already local folks inhabited in Motiong, wherein the place was unnamed at that time.

Some of these people went on sea diving to gather oyster for their daily consumption and the rest barter goods such as rice, corn, cassava, taro, yam tubers, sea foods and abaca fibers to other neighboring barrios and municipalities. There were only few local caravans who are traveling in groups aided in defense against bandits as well as helped to improve economies of scale in trade although, only few people have the means to buy commodities.

One man tried to open one oyster and with great astonishment, he found a lustrous pearl where he called “Mutya”. Believing that the place was full of treasure, the settlers started to name the place “Mutya” which to means “Land of Treasure”.

The bridge near Motiong was once used to ambush the Japanese in World War II.

Mariano Sapetin, Valentin Conge, Simon Tingzon Sr., Claudio Tingzon and Antonio Abalos were few people who persuaded to make Motiong an independent town. The reward of their effort was the House Bill No. 1844 by Congressman Tito V. Tizon which was approved as Republic Act No. 290 on June 16, 1948. It separated into another town the barrios of Motiong, Bayog, Uyandic, Calantawan, Sinampigan, Calape, Bonga, Hinicaan, Caluyahan, Malolobog, and Maypangi, formerly part of the town of Wright. Mariano Sapetin and Antonio Uy were appointed as first mayor and vice mayor respectively.

== Geography ==
=== Barangays ===
Motiong is politically subdivided into 30 barangays. Each barangay consists of puroks and some have sitios.

- Poblacion I
- Poblacion I-A
- Angyap
- Barayong
- Bayog
- Beri
- Bonga
- Calantawan
- Calapi
- Caluyahan
- Canatuan
- Candomacol
- Canvais
- Capaysagan
- Caranas
- Caulayanan
- Hinica-an
- Inalad
- Linonoban
- Malobago
- Malonoy
- Mararangsi
- Maypange
- New Minarog
- Oyandic
- Pamamasan
- San Andres
- Santo Niño
- Sarao
- Pusongan

=== Climate ===
Climate data for Motiong, Samar
Month	Jan	Feb	Mar	Apr	May	Jun	Jul	Aug	Sep	Oct	Nov	Dec	Year
Mean daily maximum °C (°F)	27 (81)	28 (82)	28 (82)	30 (86)	30 (86)	30 (86)	29 (84)	29 (84)	29 (84)	29 (84)	28 (82)	28 (82)	29 (84)
Mean daily minimum °C (°F)	22 (72)	22 (72)	22 (72)	23 (73)	24 (75)	24 (75)	24 (75)	24 (75)	24 (75)	24 (75)	23 (73)	23 (73)	23 (74)
Average precipitation mm (inches)	114 (4.5)	81 (3.2)	94 (3.7)	81 (3.2)	119 (4.7)	192 (7.6)	186 (7.3)	158 (6.2)	167 (6.6)	185 (7.3)	202 (8.0)	176 (6.9)	1,755 (69.2)
Average rainy days	18.6	14.7	16.8	17.8	22.3	25.9	27.5	26.2	26.6	27.0	24.6	22.3	270.3
Source: Meteoblue

== Demographics ==
Population census of Motiong
Year	Pop.	±% p.a.
1903	3,352	—
1948	4,480	+0.65%
1960	6,757	+3.48%
1970	9,343	+3.29%
1975	9,448	+0.22%
1980	10,035	+1.21%
1990	12,115	+1.90%
1995	13,177	+1.59%
2000	13,147	−0.05%
2007	13,549	+0.42%
2010	14,829	+3.34%
2015	15,156	+0.42%
2020	15,276	+0.17%
2024	15,887	+0.95%
Source: Philippine Statistics Authority

== Economy ==
Poverty incidence of Motiong (%)

Source: Philippine Statistics Authority
