= Santa Rita, Samar =

Municipality in Samar, Philippines

Santa Rita
- Municipality
- Municipality of Santa Rita
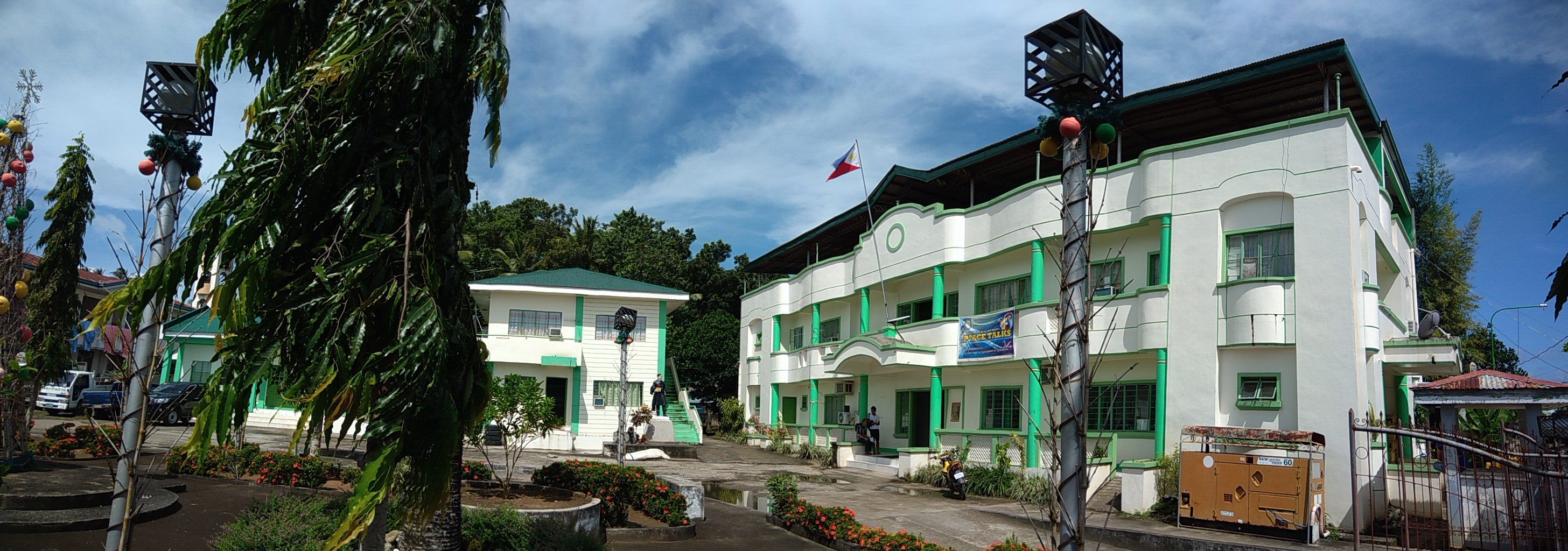
- Municipal Hall

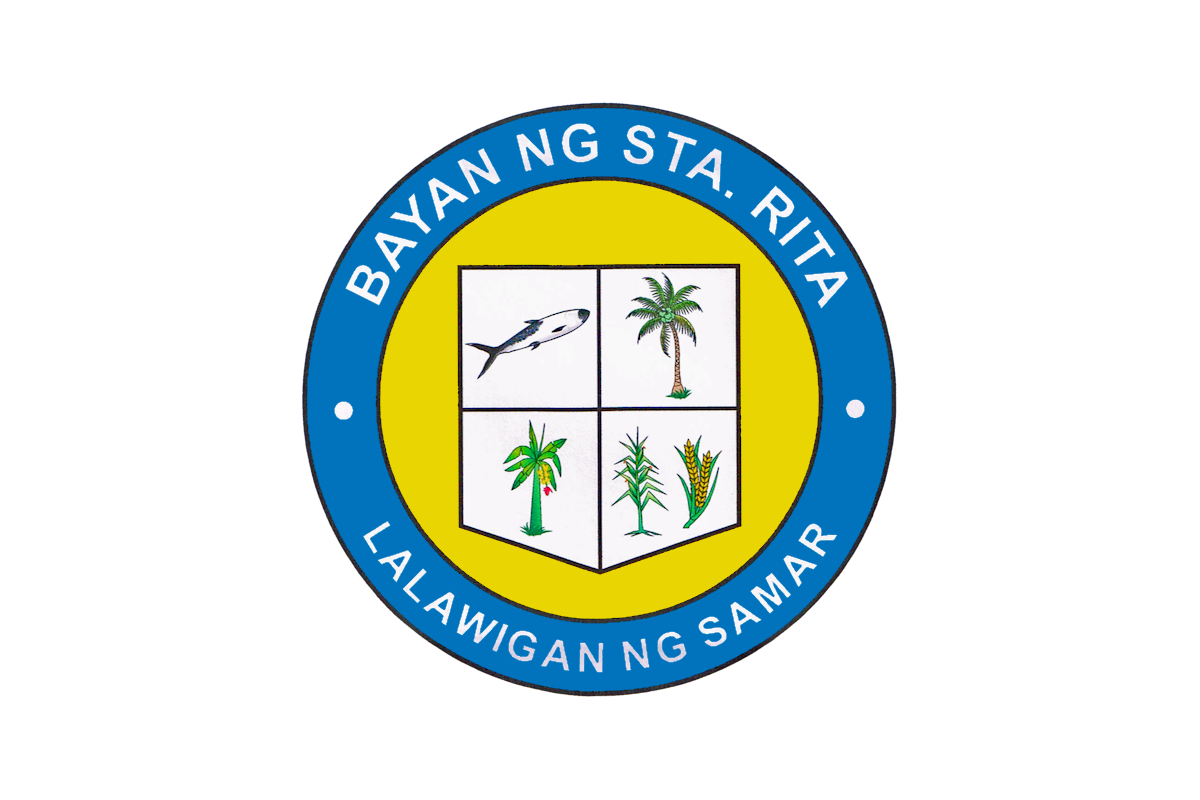
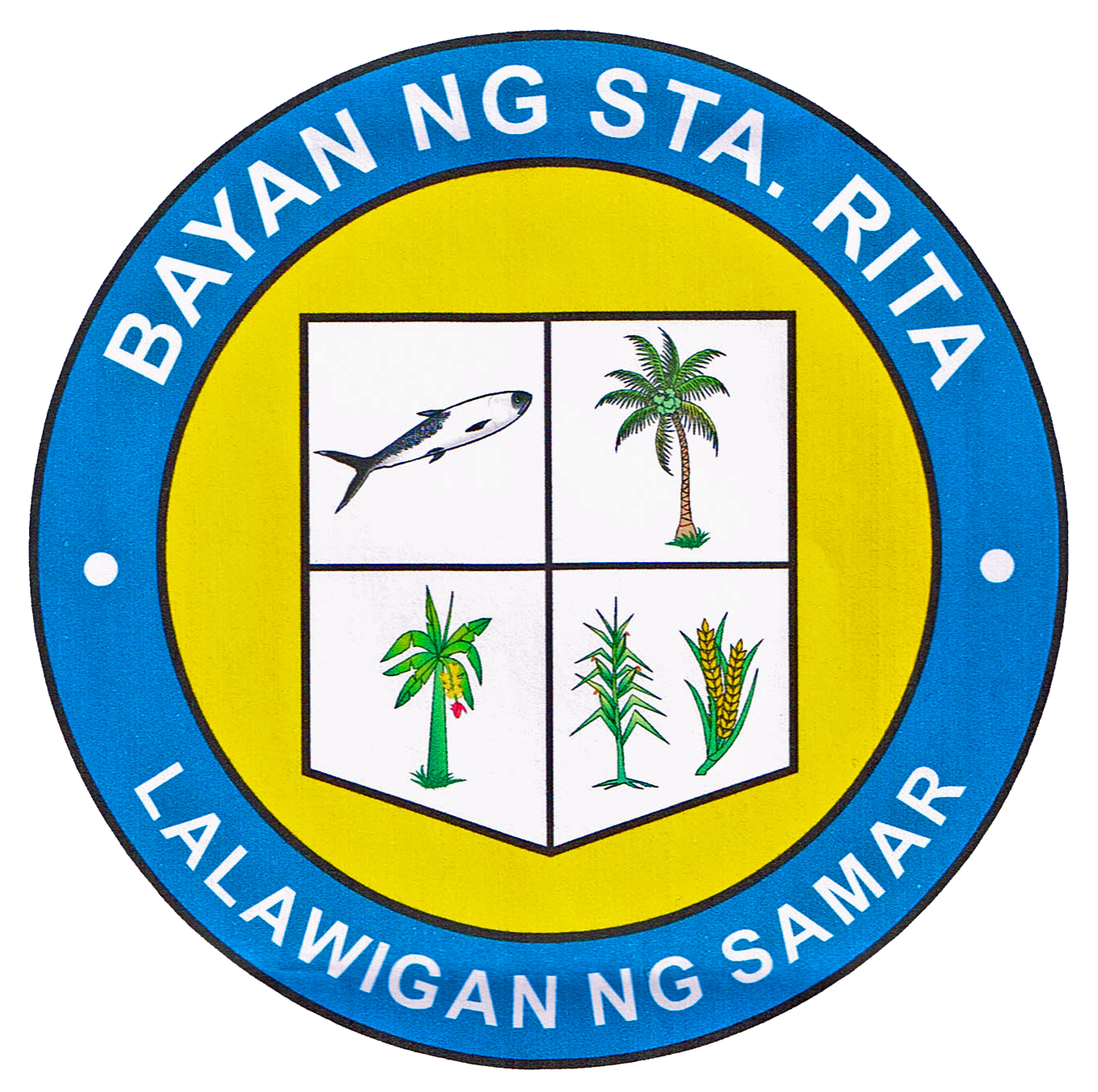
- Flag Seal

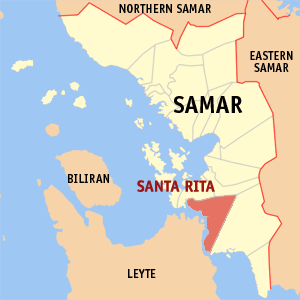
- Map of Samar with Santa Rita highlighted
- Interactive map of Santa Rita
- Location within the Philippines
- Coordinates: 11°27′08″N 124°56′27″E
- Country: Philippines
- Region: Eastern Visayas
- Province: Samar
- District: 2nd district
- Founded: 1864
- Named for: St. Rita of Cascia
- Barangays: 38 (see Barangays)

Government
  - Type: Sangguniang Bayan
  - Mayor: Jascha Mae R. Tiu
  - Vice Mayor: Joven P. Tiu
  - Representative: Reynolds Michael Tan
  - Councilors: List: • Maximo I. Cajefe Jr.; • Erlinda P. Baluran; • Gaudencio T. Espino Jr.; • Mario E. Llarenas; • Ramon B. Golong; • Juan M. Balena Jr.; • Eduardo P. Magbanua; • Joel O. Ybañez; DILG Masterlist of Officials
  - Electorate: 30,628 voters (2025)

Area
  - Total: 411.77 km^{2} (158.99 sq mi)
- Elevation: 14 m (46 ft)

Population (2024 census)
  - Total: 42,397
  - Density: 102.96/km^{2} (266.67/sq mi)
  - Households: 9,778

Economy
  - Income class: 1st municipal income class
  - Poverty incidence: 35.78% (2023)
  - Revenue: ₱ 289.6 million (2024)
  - Assets: ₱ 783.4 million (2024)
  - Expenditure: ₱ 280.9 million (2024)
  - Liabilities: ₱ 173.1 million (2024)

Service provider
  - Electricity: Samar 2 Electric Cooperative (SAMELCO 2)
- Time zone: UTC+8 (PST)
- ZIP code: 6711
- PSGC: 0806017000
- IDD : area code: +63 (0)55
- Native languages: Waray; Tagalog

Santa Rita, officially the Municipality of Santa Rita (Waray: Bungto han Santa Rita; Tagalog: Bayan ng Santa Rita), is a municipality in the province of Samar, Philippines. According to the 2024 census, it has a population of 42,397 people.

Santa Rita is connected to Tacloban and Leyte Island by the San Juanico Bridge.

== History ==
Local tradition dates the founding of this town in late 18th century. According to some aged inhabitants, the original settlers were the tribes of the Amistoso, Lacambra, and Agoy. Joaquin Amistoso rose to be their leader. The San Juanico Strait was supposed to have been named in his honor. These people made their living by fishing and small-scale farming. Captain Bartolome Sanchez, the head of a Spanish expedition in 1800, was captivated by the friendliness and hospitality of the people in the island so he decided to stay and help them. He called the neighboring tribes to unite with them and appointed Joaquin Amistoso to be the Cabeza de Barangay. In years between 1810 and 1898, several attempts of fleet of Moro vintas or “pancos” who tried to rob the puro's golden bell, which was given by the Spaniards. Aged inhabitants believed that this bell had a melodious sound, which echoed up to Mindanao. This attracted the Moros who kept on attempting to raid the place. The tribes who guarded the bell to keep it safe in the “puro” fought against the moros. The ruins of the fortress locally known as “barawalte” still stands today and are mute evidence of Moro raids in the past. Today, the question of the whereabouts of the bell is still on the minds of the people because it is nowhere to be found. The first site of the town was a small island between Samar and Leyte originally known as “Puro”. Later, it was called Tabucan because the natives from the mainland had to cross the strait before reaching the island community. Now, it is officially called Santa Rita.

Originally, the patron saint of the town was Saint Roch (San Roque). Later, it was changed to Santa Rita of Cascia. Some aged residents said that a fisherman while promenading along the shore saw a woman walking by the sea at a distance. When he came nearer where he saw the woman, he found out that it was just a log. This phenomenon occurred three times. The fisherman became curios, so he turned the log and saw the face of a nun. He brought this statue to the priest at “Puro”. The priest identified the statue as Saint Rita of Cascia. From then on, the people of the place changed their patron saint from Saint Roque to Saint Rita of Cascia. As the days went on, the residents renamed the place from “Puro” or Tabucan to Santa Rita. From that time on, it was said that the saint performed many miracles to protect the people in the island most especially against the moro raids. Years passed and Santa Rita was rapidly populated. The inhabitants transferred across the mainland of Samar to a place called Lalawiton, the present site of the municipality.

On January 2, 1864, the Spanish authorities officially recognized the municipality of Santa Rita. Before that time, Santa Rita belonged to the municipality of Basey. This is the statement of declaration of the Spaniards when they fully acknowledged the municipality, “La fundacion de este pueblo se debe á los RR. PP. agustinos, hallándose como vista del de Basey cuando recibimos de dichos RR. PP. su administracion el año de 1804. Por decreto del Superior Gobierno de 2 de Enero de 1864 fué separado de Basey, formando parroquia con la vista de Catongaan”. Santa Rita was separated from Basey because Santa Rita has established its own parish.

== Geography ==
=== Barangays ===
Santa Rita is politically subdivided into 38 barangays. Each barangay consists of puroks and some have sitios.

In 1957, sitio Dampigan was converted into a barrio.

- Alegria
- Anibongon
- Aslum
- Bagolibas
- Binanalan
- Cabacungan
- Cabunga-an
- Camayse
- Cansadong
- Caticugan
- Dampigan
- Guinbalot-an
- Hinangudtan
- Igang-igang
- La Paz
- Lupig
- Magsaysay
- Maligaya
- New Manunca
- Old Manunca
- Pagsulhogon
- Salvacion
- San Eduardo
- San Isidro
- San Juan
- San Pascual (Crossing)
- San Pedro
- San Roque
- Santa Elena
- Tagacay
- Tominamos
- Tulay
- Union
- Santan Pob. (Zone I)
- Bougainvilla Pob. (Zone II)
- Rosal Pob. (Zone III)
- Gumamela Pob. (Zone IV)
- Bokinggan Pob. (Zone V)

=== Climate ===
Climate data for Santa Rita, Samar
| Month | Jan | Feb | Mar | Apr | May | Jun | Jul | Aug | Sep | Oct | Nov | Dec | Year |
|---|---|---|---|---|---|---|---|---|---|---|---|---|---|
| Mean daily maximum °C (°F) | 28 (82) | 28 (82) | 29 (84) | 30 (86) | 30 (86) | 30 (86) | 29 (84) | 30 (86) | 30 (86) | 29 (84) | 29 (84) | 28 (82) | 29 (84) |
| Mean daily minimum °C (°F) | 22 (72) | 22 (72) | 22 (72) | 23 (73) | 24 (75) | 24 (75) | 24 (75) | 24 (75) | 24 (75) | 24 (75) | 23 (73) | 23 (73) | 23 (74) |
| Average precipitation mm (inches) | 90 (3.5) | 67 (2.6) | 82 (3.2) | 70 (2.8) | 97 (3.8) | 145 (5.7) | 142 (5.6) | 127 (5.0) | 132 (5.2) | 152 (6.0) | 169 (6.7) | 144 (5.7) | 1,417 (55.8) |
| Average rainy days | 17.0 | 13.5 | 16.0 | 16.5 | 20.6 | 24.3 | 26.0 | 25.4 | 25.2 | 26.4 | 23.0 | 21.0 | 254.9 |
Source: Meteoblue

== Demographics ==
Population census of Santa Rita
| Year | Pop. | ±% p.a. |
|---|---|---|
| 1903 | 4,110 | — |
| 1918 | 7,245 | +3.85% |
| 1939 | 9,949 | +1.52% |
| 1948 | 14,838 | +4.54% |
| 1960 | 18,808 | +2.00% |
| 1970 | 20,713 | +0.97% |
| 1975 | 24,054 | +3.04% |
| 1980 | 21,640 | −2.09% |
| 1990 | 25,202 | +1.54% |
| 1995 | 28,930 | +2.62% |
| 2000 | 30,118 | +0.87% |
| 2007 | 34,959 | +2.08% |
| 2010 | 38,082 | +3.16% |
| 2015 | 41,591 | +1.69% |
| 2020 | 42,384 | +0.40% |
| 2024 | 42,397 | +0.01% |
Source: Philippine Statistics Authority

== Economy ==
Poverty incidence of Santa Rita (%)

Source: Philippine Statistics Authority

== Government ==
=== List of former chief executives ===
In 1908, the first local elections were held and Pedro Amistoso was elected municipal president. Succeeding him were:

- Mamerto Ilagan (1910)
- Alipio Regaret (1912)
- Inocencio Hilvano (1916)
- Florentino Nerviol (1928-1932), (1942-1946)
- Margarito Caberic (1932-1940), (1946-1947)
- Conrado Adolfo (1940-1941)
- Isidro Zeta (1947)
- Simplicio Lacaba (1947-1954)
- Gaudencio Espino Sr. (1960-1968)
- Pedro Hilvano (1954-1960), (1968-1982)
- Densaldo Alvarez (1982-1986)
- Silverio Macariola (1986-1998)
- Leticia Macariola (1998-2000)
- Beatriz Tiopes (2000-2007)
- Lisandro Kim Adolfo (2007-2013)
- Joven P. Tiu (2013–2022)
- Jade Kie R. Tiu (2022–2025)
- Jascha Mae R. Tiu (2025–present)
