= Santo Niño, Samar =

Municipality in Samar, Philippines

Santo Niño
- Municipality
- Municipality of Santo Niño
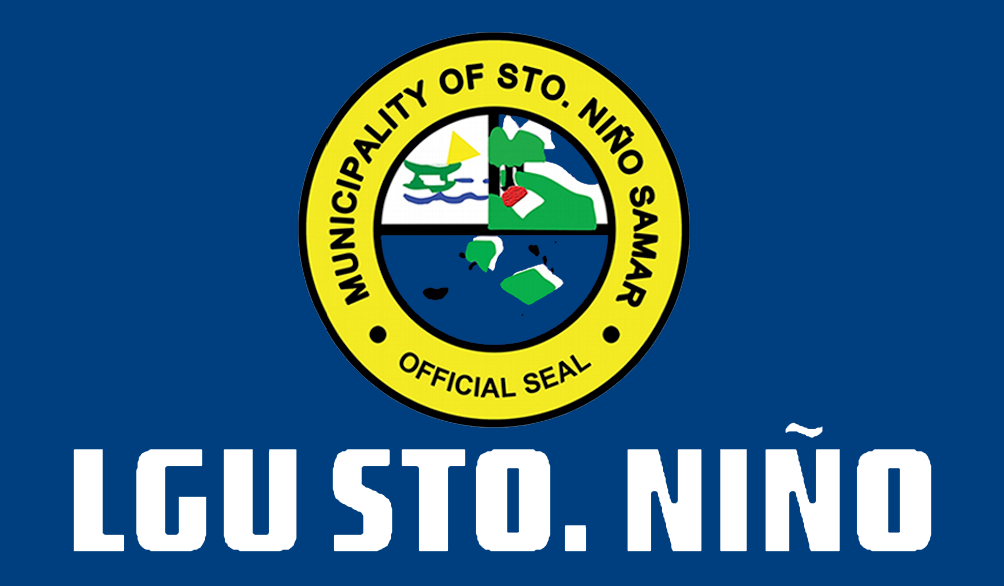
- Flag

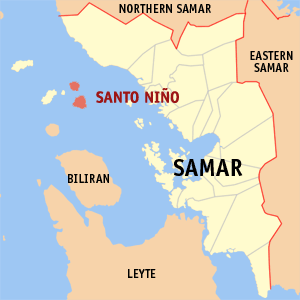
- Map of Samar with Santo Niño highlighted
- Interactive map of Santo Niño
- Location within the Philippines
- Coordinates: 11°55′35″N 124°26′57″E
- Country: Philippines
- Region: Eastern Visayas
- Province: Samar
- District: 1st district
- Barangays: 13 (see Barangays)

Government
  - Type: Sangguniang Bayan
  - Mayor: Marinell A. Apolonio
  - Vice Mayor: Lilia A. Coñejos
  - Representative: Stephen James Tan
  - Electorate: 12,640 voters (2025)

Area
  - Total: 29.53 km^{2} (11.40 sq mi)
- Elevation: 10 m (33 ft)
- Highest elevation: 899 m (2,949 ft)
- Lowest elevation: 0 m (0 ft)

Population (2024 census)
  - Total: 13,088
  - Density: 443.2/km^{2} (1,148/sq mi)
  - Households: 3,029

Economy
  - Income class: 5th municipal income class
  - Poverty incidence: 31.74% (2023)
  - Revenue: ₱ 105.5 million (2024)
  - Assets: ₱ 339 million (2024)
  - Expenditure: ₱ 104.7 million (2024)
  - Liabilities: ₱ 40.54 million (2024)

Service provider
  - Electricity: Samar 1 Electric Cooperative (SAMELCO 1)
- Time zone: UTC+8 (PST)
- ZIP code: 6712
- PSGC: 0806018000
- IDD : area code: +63 (0)55
- Native languages Waray language: Cebuano; Waray; Tagalog

Santo Niño, officially the Municipality of Santo Niño (Waray: Bungto han Santo Niño; Cebuano: Lungsod sa Santo Niño; Tagalog: Bayan ng Santo Niño), is a municipality in the province of Samar, Philippines. According to the 2024 census, it has a population of 13,088 people.

Formerly known as Limbancauayan, it consists of the northern island of Camandag and the larger Santo Niño Island about 3.1 kilometers (1.9 mi) to the south. In between those two islands is the smaller Pilar Island. The municipality's poblacion (town center) is located in Santo Niño Island.

== History ==
This town has an ancient Bisayan name Limbankawayan which derived from the word limba meaning red and kawayan means bamboo thus a red colored bamboo (phyllostachys iridescens) which is abundant during those days.

It was separated from Calbayog and made a pueblo and a parish by a Royal Decree of September 29, 1898. The Bishop of Cebu had recommended in 1895 that it achieve parish status, though final approval and confirmation was not relayed from Madrid through Manila until the year 1897.

== Geography ==
Santo Niño consists of three islands: Santo Niño Island, Camandag Island and Pilar Island. These islands are located in the Samar Sea about 24 kilometers (15 mi) south-west of Calbayog on the main island of Samar.

Santo Niño Island

The larger Santo Niño Island is about 18 kilometers (11 mi) north-west of Maripipi, Biliran province with an area of about 19.4 square kilometers (7.5 sq mi). Both islands are volcanic in origin with Santo Niño having the highest elevation in the municipality at 470 meters (1,540 ft).

Camandag Island

The circular Camandag Island is located north of Santo Niño Island, about 3.1 kilometers (1.9 mi) shore to shore. It has area of about 9.8 square kilometers (3.8 sq mi) with an elevation of 429 meters (1,407 ft).

Pilar Island

The smallest island of the municipality is located 2.3 kilometers (1.4 mi) off north-west of Santo Niño Island and about 3.5 kilometers (2.2 mi) south-west of Camandag Island. Pilar Island has an elevation of 145 feet (44 m).

=== Barangays ===
Santo Niño is politically subdivided into 13 barangays. Each barangay consists of puroks and some have sitios.

Barangay	Location
Balatguti	Camandag Island
Baras	Santo Niño Island
Basud (Poblacion)	Santo Niño Island
Buenavista	Santo Niño Island
Cabunga-an	Santo Niño Island
Corocawayan	Camandag Island
Ilijan	Santo Niño Island
Ilo (Poblacion)	Santo Niño Island
Lobelobe	Camandag Island
Pinanangnan	Camandag Island
Sevilla	Camandag Island
Takut	Santo Niño Island
Villahermosa	Camandag Island

=== Climate ===
Climate data for Santo Niño, Samar
Month	Jan	Feb	Mar	Apr	May	Jun	Jul	Aug	Sep	Oct	Nov	Dec	Year
Mean daily maximum °C (°F)	28 (82)	29 (84)	29 (84)	31 (88)	31 (88)	30 (86)	29 (84)	29 (84)	29 (84)	29 (84)	29 (84)	28 (82)	29 (85)
Mean daily minimum °C (°F)	21 (70)	21 (70)	21 (70)	22 (72)	24 (75)	24 (75)	24 (75)	25 (77)	24 (75)	24 (75)	23 (73)	22 (72)	23 (73)
Average precipitation mm (inches)	72 (2.8)	52 (2.0)	65 (2.6)	62 (2.4)	87 (3.4)	129 (5.1)	153 (6.0)	124 (4.9)	147 (5.8)	157 (6.2)	139 (5.5)	117 (4.6)	1,304 (51.3)
Average rainy days	17.4	13.4	16.8	18.0	22.0	25.3	26.2	24.2	24.9	26.0	23.3	20.8	258.3
Source: Meteoblue

== Demographics ==
Population census of Santo Niño
Year	Pop.	±% p.a.
1903	3,372	—
1918	3,833	+0.86%
1939	4,926	+1.20%
1948	6,003	+2.22%
1960	8,304	+2.74%
1970	9,086	+0.90%
1975	11,124	+4.14%
1980	11,132	+0.01%
1990	11,743	+0.54%
1995	12,761	+1.57%
2000	12,545	−0.37%
2007	12,777	+0.25%
2010	13,504	+2.03%
2015	12,863	−0.92%
2020	12,519	−0.57%
2024	13,088	+1.07%
Source: Philippine Statistics Authority

== Economy ==
Poverty incidence of Santo Niño (%)

Source: Philippine Statistics Authority

== Transportation ==
There are no airports on the islands of Santo Niño and Camandag. The islands are reached by boats from the Port of Calbayog.

== See also ==
- List of islands of the Philippines
