= Reynolds Michael Tan =

Filipino politician

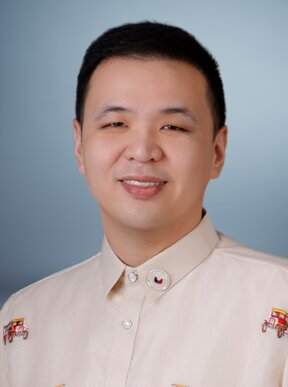
- Official portrait, 2025

Member of the Philippine House of Representatives from Samar's 2nd District
- Incumbent
- Assumed office June 30, 2022
- Preceded by: Sharee Ann Tan

House Deputy Minority Leader
- Incumbent
- Assumed office July 30, 2025
- Leader: Marcelino Libanan

23rd Governor of Samar
- In office November 30, 2019 – June 30, 2022
- Vice Governor: Angelica Gomez-Teodoro
- Preceded by: Milagrosa Tan
- Succeeded by: Sharee Ann Tan

Vice Governor of Samar
- In office June 30, 2019 – November 30, 2019
- Governor: Milagrosa Tan
- Preceded by: Stephen James Tan
- Succeeded by: Angelica Gomez-Teodoro

Personal details
- Born: Reynolds Michael Tee Tan; November 18, 1988 (age 37) San Juan, Metro Manila, Philippines
- Party: Lakas (2024–present)
- Other political affiliations: Nacionalista (2021–2024); PDP–Laban (2018–2021)
- Education: International School for Culinary Arts and Hotel Management
- Occupation: Politician

Reynolds Michael Tee Tan (born November 18, 1988) is a Filipino politician from the province of Samar. He currently serves as Member of the Philippine House of Representatives for the 2nd District of Samar since 2022. Before being elected as congressman, he served as Governor of Samar and Vice Governor.

== Political career ==
In 2019, Tan ran and won as Vice Governor of Samar beating former Vice Governor Jesus Redaja. He succeeded the post from his brother Stephen James Tan who held the position for three terms.

In November 30, 2019, Tan succeeded the position of governor after the untimely demise of his mother, Governor Milagrosa Tan.

In 2022, Tan although still eligible to run for governor did not file for re-election but instead ran for Congressman of the 2nd District of Samar, switching places with his sister Sharee Ann Tan. Both Reynolds Michael and Sharee Ann won the elections.

In 2025, Tan ran unopposed for his second term as representative of the 2nd District of Samar.

=== Tan political clan ===
Reynolds Michael belongs to the influential Tan political clan of Samar, one of the province’s dominant political families.

Since 2022, Reynolds Michael, together with his siblings Sharee Ann Tan and Stephen James Tan, has been part of the province’s incumbent political leadership.

Sharee Ann Tan is the incumbent governor of Samar, a position she has held since 2022. She previously served as governor from 2010 to 2019, and also represented Samar’s 2nd District in the House of Representatives from 2007 to 2010 and again from 2019 to 2022.

Stephen James Tan is the incumbent representative of Samar’s 1st District, serving since 2022. Prior to his election to Congress, he served as vice governor of Samar from 2010 to 2019.

Their mother, Milagrosa Tan, held several key positions in Samar’s local government. She served as a member of the Sangguniang Panlalawigan for Samar’s 2nd District from 1998 to 2001, governor from 2001 to 2010, representative of Samar’s 2nd District from 2010 to 2019, and governor again from 2019 until her death.

His paternal uncle, Arnold V. Tan, has served as the vice governor of Samar since 2022.

Another paternal uncle, Ruben V. Tan, served as a member of the Sangguniang Panlalawigan for Samar’s 2nd District from 1995 to 1998. He became a replacement candidate for Reynolds Michael’s father, Ricardo Tan, who died before the election.

=== Governorship ===
In 2021, a known anti-mining advocate, Tan proposed for the redesign of the provincial seal of Samar to remove the logging and mining symbols and replace with a Philippine eagle.

== Personal life ==
He is married with one child.

He is the youngest child of Ricardo Tan and Milagrosa Tan; his siblings are Angelie, Stephen James and Sharee Ann Tan.

== Electoral history ==
Electoral history of Reynolds Michael Tan
Year	Office	Party	Votes received				Result
Year	Office	Party	Total	%	P.	Swing	Result
2019	Vice Governor of Samar	PDP–Laban	214,511	56.14%	1st	—N/a	Won
2022	Representative (Samar–2nd)	Nacionalista	161,825	66.21%	1st	—N/a	Won
2025	Representative (Samar–2nd)	Lakas	219,640	100.00%	1st	+33.79	Unopposed

House of Representatives of the Philippines
Preceded by Sharee Ann Tan	Member of the House of Representatives from Samar's 2nd district 2022–present	Incumbent
Political offices
Preceded by Milagrosa Tan	Governor of Samar; 2019–2022	Succeeded by Sharee Ann Tan
Preceded by Stephen James Tan	Vice Governor of Samar; 2019	Succeeded by Angelica Gomez-Teodoro
