= Bahay =

Bahay is the word for "house" in the Tagalog language and other languages in the Philippines. Bahay can also refer to several barangays in the Philippines:

- Bahay, Abuyog, Leyte
- Bahay, Caramoan, Camarines Sur
- Bahay, Libmanan, Camarines Sur
- Bahay, Liloan, Southern Leyte
- Bahay, Pasacao, Camarines Sur
- Bahay, Pastrana, Leyte
- Bahay, San Jose, Camarines Sur
- Bahay, Santa Margarita, Samar
- Bahay, San Miguel, Leyte
- Bahay, San Policarpo, Eastern Samar
- Bahay, Sibonga, Cebu
- Bahay, Tarangnan, Samar
