= Tropical Storm Conson =

Pacific severe tropical storm in 2021

Severe Tropical Storm Conson (Jolina)
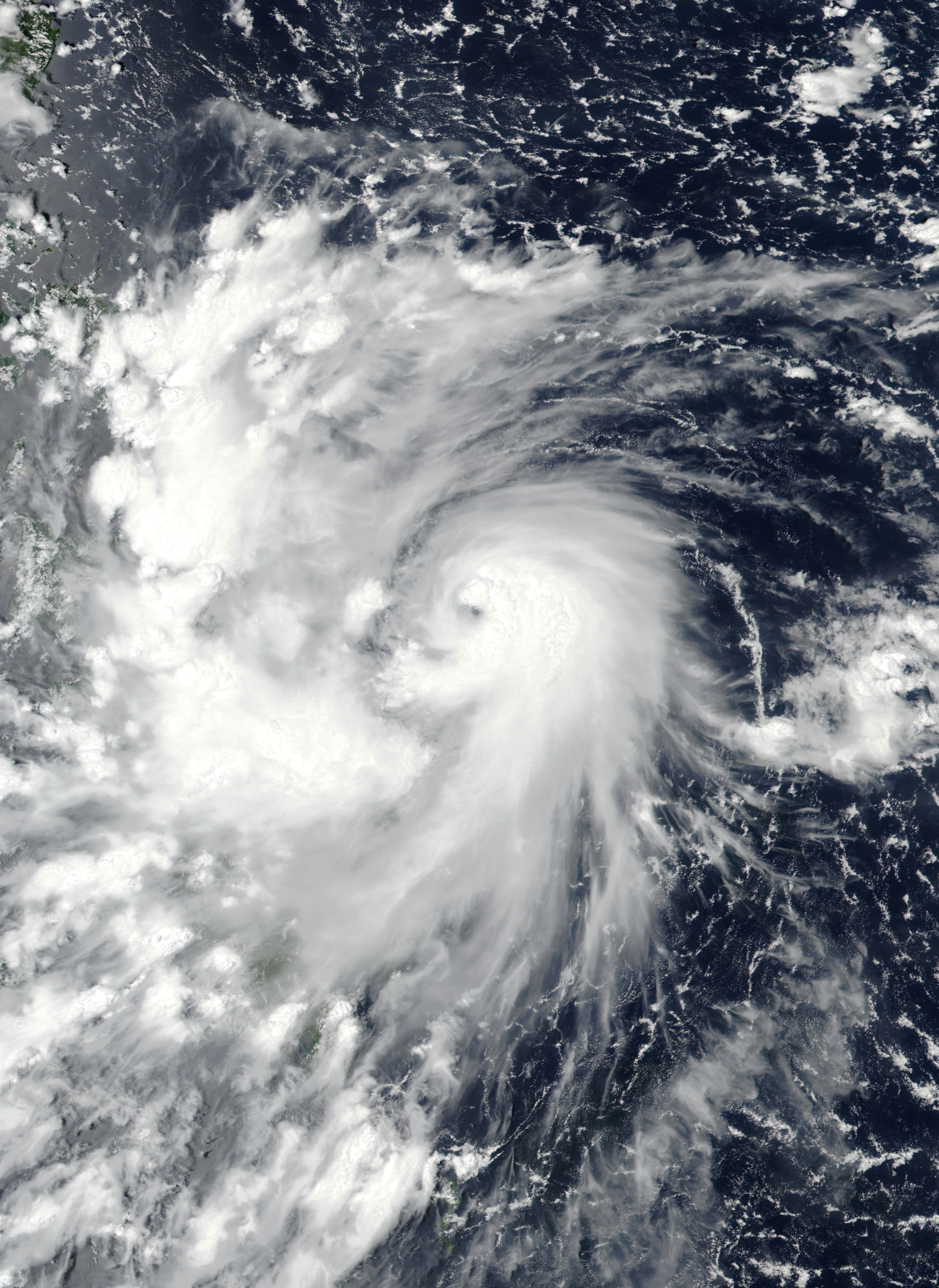
- Conson rapidly intensifying prior to landfall on September 6

Meteorological history
- Formed: September 5, 2021
- Dissipated: September 13, 2021

Severe tropical storm
- 10-minute sustained (JMA)
- Highest winds: 95 km/h (60 mph)
- Lowest pressure: 992 hPa (mbar); 29.29 inHg

Category 1-equivalent typhoon
- 1-minute sustained (SSHWS/JTWC)
- Highest winds: 120 km/h (75 mph)
- Lowest pressure: 980 hPa (mbar); 28.94 inHg

Overall effects
- Fatalities: 26
- Missing: 25
- Damage: $107 million (2021 USD)
- Areas affected: Philippines, Vietnam, Hainan
- IBTrACS
- Part of the 2021 Pacific typhoon season

Severe Tropical Storm Conson, (Note: The name Conson (Vietnamese: Côn Sơn, [kon˧˧ səːn˧˧]) was contributed by Vietnam and refers to Côn Sơn Island in southern Vietnam.) known in the Philippines as Typhoon Jolina, was a strong tropical cyclone that impacted the central Philippines and Vietnam during early September 2021. The thirteenth named storm of the annual typhoon season, Conson originated from a low-pressure area approximately 500 km (310 mi) west of Guam. It strengthened into a tropical depression on September 5, and as it formed within the Philippine Area of Responsibility (PAR), the Philippine Atmospheric, Geophysical, and Astronomical Services Administration (PAGASA) named the system Jolina. Over the next day, it intensified into a tropical storm and was named Conson by the Japan Meteorological Agency (JMA) (Note: The Japan Meteorological Agency is the official Regional Specialized Meteorological Center for the western Pacific Ocean.). As the storm neared Samar Island, it intensified into a severe tropical storm, and later into a typhoon according to the PAGASA prior to its first landfall in Eastern Samar. The storm retained its strength as it crossed the Visayas, and later, Calabarzon before weakening over Manila Bay prior to its final landfall in Bataan. It subsequently emerged into the South China Sea, where it struggled to further reintensify. Conson was then downgraded to a tropical depression just offshore of Vietnam before moving ashore near Da Nang, rapidly weakening before dissipating on September 13.

The National Disaster Risk Reduction and Management Council (NDRRMC) of the Philippines reported 23 fatalities, 32 injuries and two missing individuals. Agricultural and infrastructural damages in the country were estimated at ₱5.17 billion (US$88.3 million).

== Meteorological history ==
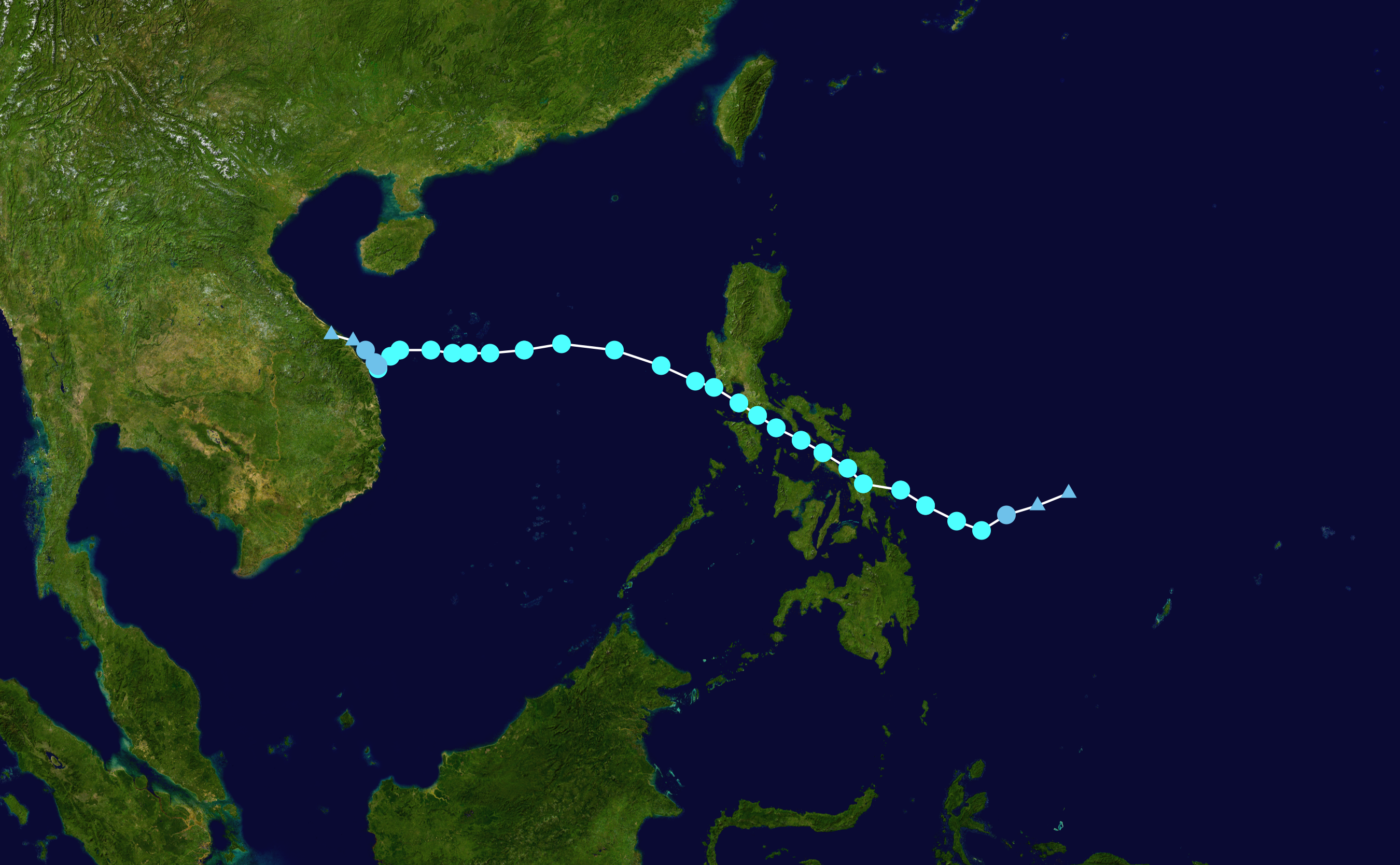
Map plotting the storm's track and intensity, according to the Saffir–Simpson scale (Note: The position of Conson's Category 1 peak is not depicted in this graphic as it is an asynoptic point (i.e. not at the 3-hour intervals of all other points) occurring at 05:00 UTC September 8.) Map key Saffir–Simpson scale Tropical depression (≤38 mph, ≤62 km/h) Tropical storm (39–73 mph, 63–118 km/h) Category 1 (74–95 mph, 119–153 km/h) Category 2 (96–110 mph, 154–177 km/h) Category 3 (111–129 mph, 178–208 km/h) Category 4 (130–156 mph, 209–251 km/h) Category 5 (≥157 mph, ≥252 km/h) Unknown Storm type Tropical cyclone Subtropical cyclone Extratropical cyclone, remnant low, tropical disturbance, or monsoon depression

At 06:00 UTC on September 5, the United States Joint Typhoon Warning Center (JTWC) (Note: The Joint Typhoon Warning Center is a joint United States Navy – United States Air Force task force that issues tropical cyclone warnings for the western Pacific Ocean and other regions.) started monitoring a tropical disturbance in the Philippine Sea, located about 446 nmi (513 mi; 826 km) east-southeast of Legazpi, Albay. Multispectral satellite imagery at the time showed a low-level circulation center (LLCC) with cloud lines wrapping around the feature. The system was also situated in a favorable environment for further development, characterized by poleward outflow, favorable wind shear, and sea surface temperatures of around 30 °C (86 °F). Over the next several hours, it gradually organized while remaining nearly stationary. At 18:00 UTC that day, the JMA upgraded the system to a tropical depression, while the PAGASA simultaneously named it Jolina after it entered the PAR, making it the tenth tropical cyclone of the season in the area. Later that day, at 23:30 UTC, the JTWC issued a Tropical Cyclone Formation Alert (TCFA) as circulation became more pronounced, accompanied by an organizing convective band to the south-southeast of the center.

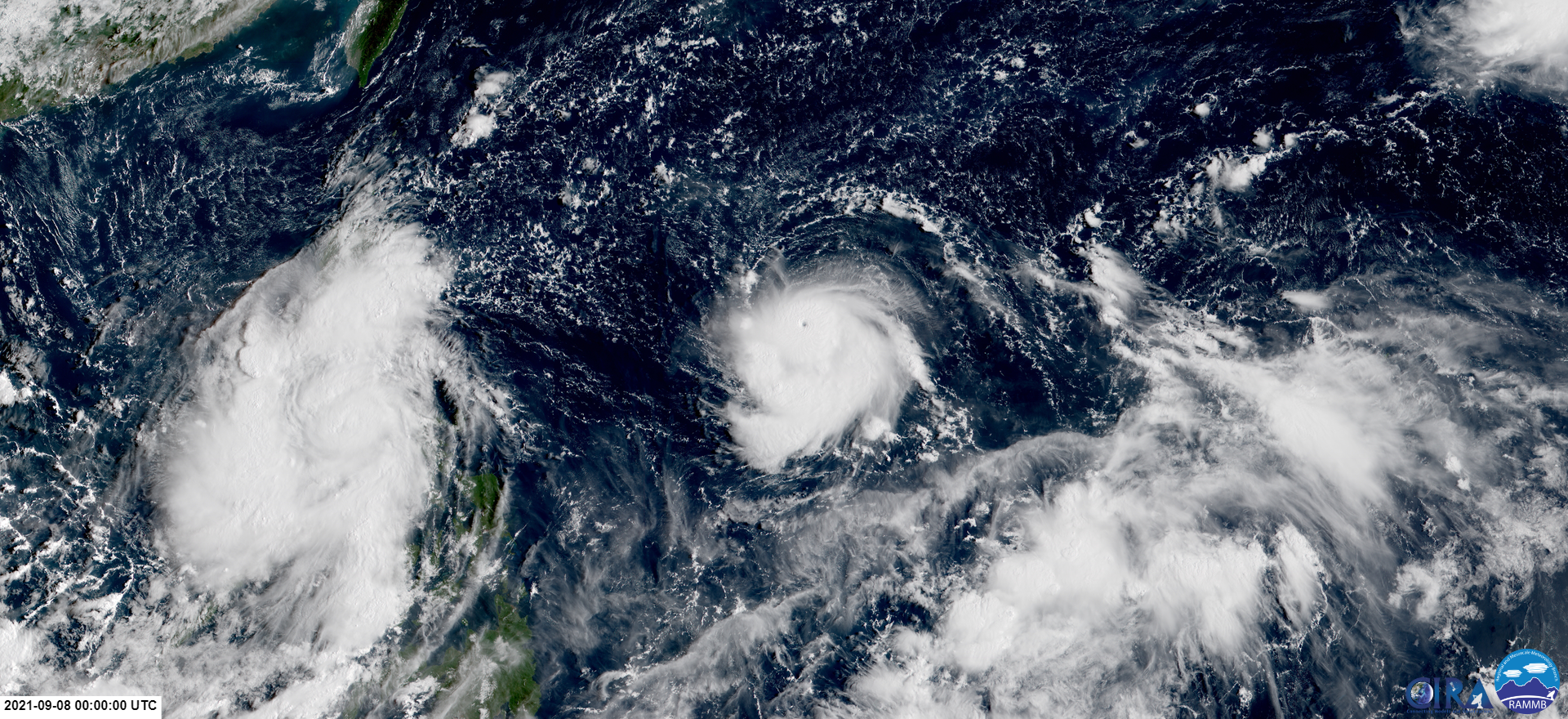
Tropical Storm Conson (left) and Typhoon Chanthu active on September 8

The following day, the agency reported that the system had further consolidated, with persistent thunderstorms developing over an obscured LLCC, and upgraded it to a tropical depression. Moving northwestward along the southwestern periphery of a subtropical ridge to the northeast, the system's organization steadily improved and an eye feature began to form. At 06:00 UTC, the depression strengthened into a tropical storm according to both the JMA and PAGASA, with the former assigning the name Conson. The JTWC also followed suit three hours later. At around the same time, 09:00 UTC (17:00 PHT), PAGASA further upgraded the system to a severe tropical storm as it neared Samar Island. Convection expanded eastward from the southeast quadrant, prompting the JMA to raise its classification two hours later. Conson subsequently intensified into a typhoon and made landfall over Hernani, Eastern Samar, at 14:00 UTC (22:00 PHT). It then traversed the Visayas, making additional landfalls in Daram, Samar, Santo Niño, Samar, Almagro, Samar, and Tagapul-an, Samar in Samar during a period of nearly six hours, from 18:00 to 23:50 UTC (02:00 to 07:50 PHT on September 7). While crossing Samar, the system continued to consolidate and briefly developed a small microwave eye.

Early on September 7, Conson made another landfall in Dimasalang, Masbate at 02:00 UTC (10:00 PHT). Interaction with land slightly weakened the system, and its LLCC became ragged. While traversing the Sibuyan Sea, however, Conson briefly produced a well-defined radar eye while maintaining its strength. It went on to make landfall in Torrijos, Marinduque at 16:15 UTC (00:15 PHT on the next day), followed by another in San Juan, Batangas at 01:00 UTC (09:00 PHT) on September 8. Despite crossing South Luzon, Conson maintained its strength while moving across Calabarzon. Over Manila Bay, its LLCC became increasingly disorganized, and PAGASA downgraded the system to a tropical storm. Conson made its final Philippine landfall in Mariveles, Bataan, at 09:00 UTC (17:00 PHT). At 12:00 UTC, it reintensified into a severe tropical storm before emerging into the South China Sea about three hours later.

Conson tracked westward across the South China Sea but struggled to consolidate. It retained tropical storm strength in a marginally favorable environment characterized by warm sea surface temperatures and moderate vertical wind shear persisted over the South China Sea until September 9. On September 10, increasing shear exposed its LLCC, weakening the system as it moved westward. Conson briefly reorganized on September 11, regaining a defined LLCC, but the improvement was short-lived as wind shear again disrupted its structure. At 12:00 UTC that day, the JMA downgraded it to a tropical storm, while the JTWC successively downgraded it to a tropical depression at 18:00 UTC and again at 02:00 UTC on September 12. The weakened system stalled near Quảng Ngãi Province in the South Central Coast of Vietnam under a weak steering pattern between three ridges. At 21:00 UTC, the JTWC issued its final advisory, noting that Conson had already made landfall near Da Nang and was rapidly weakening inland. The JMA continued to monitor the storm until it dissipated entirely at 18:00 UTC on September 13.

== Preparations ==
=== Philippines ===
==== Highest Tropical Cyclone Wind Signal ====
Highest Tropical Cyclone Wind Signal issued by PAGASA for Conson (Jolina) in each province. The white line represents the best track.

Upon the system's designation as a tropical depression, the PAGASA raised Tropical Cyclone Wind Signals for Eastern Visayas and the extreme tip of Mindanao as well as the Bicol Region and some areas of Calabarzon and Mimaropa. As the system developed into a typhoon, portions of Samar and Eastern Samar were placed under Signal #3.

The Philippine Coast Guard (PCG) suspended sea trips in the northern tip of Mindanao as early as September 6. The PCG also suspended trips in Eastern Samar, Capiz, Negros Occidental, and the Bicol Region on September 7. 2,500 passengers were stranded in sea ports around Luzon and Visayas by evening. Flights from Manila to Tacloban and Legazpi Airport (and vice versa) were cancelled on September 7 due to inclement weather. On September 8, flights from Manila to Davao, Puerto Princesa, Singapore, Abu Dhabi and Taipei (and vice versa) were also cancelled, along with flights from Japan and Guam to Manila (and vice-versa).

Before and during the storm, classes were suspended in 313 municipalities and work was suspended in 320 municipalities. Classes in all levels for September 7 were suspended in the entire island of Samar including Catbalogan, the entire province of Albay, and in the cities of Tacloban and Ormoc in Leyte. Classes in all levels for September 8 were suspended in the entire provinces of Cavite, Quezon and Laguna. Including in the cities of Antipolo, San Juan, Taguig. Government work was also suspended in Laguna and Quezon. Ateneo de Manila University and University of Santo Tomas also suspended classes for September 8. Preemptive evacuations began in the lower Bicol Region by September 7. Manila and Quezon City began evacuating families on September 8. A total of 11,062 individuals were preemptively evacuated.

=== Vietnam ===
Due to Conson's approach in the country, over 500,000 soldiers were released and put on standby as its government prepared emergency plans to ride out the storm. Many ships and vessels were also instructed to stay on ports. Health Ministry Tuoi Tre claimed that individuals living in areas that are under coronavirus lockdowns had to be evacuated to safer places and health regulations had to be enforced. 100 to 200 millimeters with isolated 250 millimeters of rain were forecasted for the country. Roofs of houses in Liên Chiểu District, Da Nang were secured as a precaution while boats on Thọ Quang were moved onshore. Phước Sơn, Quảng Nam also delivered 14 tons of rice to Phước Kim, Phuoc Thanh and Phuoc Loc to prevent traffic. Classes across the province were also canceled and 14 families on Hội An were moved to evacuation shelters due to the storm. Four reservoirs in Hà Tĩnh also released their waters as a safety procedure and the Mekong River's water level were seen to increase due to the storm.

== Impact ==
=== Philippines ===
Conson caused widespread impacts in Luzon and Visayas. Flooding was reported in the regions of Central Luzon, Calabarzon, Mimaropa, Bicol, Western Visayas, Central Visayas and Eastern Visayas. Rough seas also prevailed during Conson's approach to the country. By April 4, 2022, the National Disaster Risk Reduction and Management Council in the Philippines reported 23 deaths, 32 injuries and 2 missing individuals. 465,973 persons were affected by the storm — 294,777 of which were from Eastern Visayas.

The Metropolitan Manila Development Authority reported floods in Manila, Navotas, Mandaluyong and Malabon, as well as Masbate and Tacloban. In Miagao, Iloilo, flash floods destroyed 241 hectares of rice after major rivers in the town overflowed. Rains from Conson also submerged rice fields in Libertad, Antique and destroyed a spillway in San Francisco, Quezon. Water levels in the Ipo Dam reached its spilling level of 101 meters due to the heavy rain, alerting areas near the Angat River of possible flooding. Bustos Dam and Angat Dam, both also impounding Angat River, neared their spilling levels in the morning of September 8.

ECHO infographic showing the impacts of Conson in the Philippines.

The Philippine Coast Guard, Philippine National Police and Ormoc City authorities rescued individuals trapped in floodwaters in the area starting on the night of September 6 until the next morning. A fishing boat capsized in Hamtic, Antique as it was swept out of the sea by the storm, injuring one of the crew members. Another boat capsized in Cataingan, where six fishermen had to be rescued. 50 fishermen from the provinces of Leyte and Samar were rescued as strong waves hit various vessels in Eastern Visayas. Conson left 10 dead and 9 missing in Eastern Visayas. A fishing boat capsized in Catbalogan, killing one crew member. The seven other crew members were later rescued. A vessel sank in Marinduque, leading to one person drowning. A man fell into a river in Placer, Masbate, and was later found dead. In addition, a resort worker in Batangas was killed in a landslide. Nine individuals were injured while one was reported missing in Eastern Samar. Another two were injured in Atimonan when a cargo truck fell into a ravine after the vehicle lost control.

A total of 21,642 houses were damaged in various regions around the country — of which the majority were only partially affected. The Office of Civil Defense in Bicol reported at least ₱13.7 million in damages to fishing boats and equipment. Five transmission lines in Eastern Visayas failed, affecting 286,243 power consumers and causing blackouts in Tacloban, as well as the entire provinces of Samar and Eastern Samar. An estimated 29,503.37 ha (72,904.4 acres) of crop area was affected by the storm, with total agricultural costs of up to ₱3.21 billion. Infrastructural damages are estimated at ₱1.95 billion for a grand total of ₱5.17 billion (US$88.3 million) in overall damages.

=== Vietnam ===
Although Conson rapidly weakened before making landfall on the Vietnamese coast, the storm and its rainbands still produced heavy rainfall and winds. Bình Tân (Quảng Ngãi) recorded a whopping 910 mm (36 in) of rain. Two people were killed by flooding. Another 23 ship crews from 3 vessels were also killed, in the waters off of Bach Long Vy island and Ha Tinh. Agriculture damages on the island of Lý Sơn is estimated to be at least 100 billion đồng (US$4.4 million). Total damage was amounted to 285 billion đồng (US$12.6 million).

=== Laos ===
The remnants of Conson brought heavy rains and triggered flooding in Salavan province, which killed one person and injured 9 others. More than 100 houses were damaged, in which 30 of them were severely damaged. Damages were reported to be LAK140 billion (US$14.6 million).

== Retirement ==
After the season, PAGASA announced that the name Jolina was retired from their naming lists, after the typhoon caused more than ₱1 billion in damages on its onslaught in the country. On March 21, 2022, the PAGASA chose the name Jacinto as its replacement for the 2025 Pacific typhoon season.

In early 2023, the Typhoon Committee announced that the name Conson, along with two others were retired from the naming lists. In the spring of 2024, the name was replaced with Luc-Binh, which refers to the water hyacinth (Eichhornia) in Vietnamese.

== See also ==
- Weather of 2021
- Tropical cyclones in 2021
- Typhoon Xangsane (2006) – a typhoon that took an almost similar path while traversing through the Philippines.
- Typhoon Ketsana (2009)
- Tropical Storm Nock-ten (2011)
- Tropical Storm Rumbia (2013)
- Tropical Storm Nalgae (2022)
