= Samar's 1st congressional district =

Legislative district of the Philippines

- Constituency for the House of Representatives of the Philippines
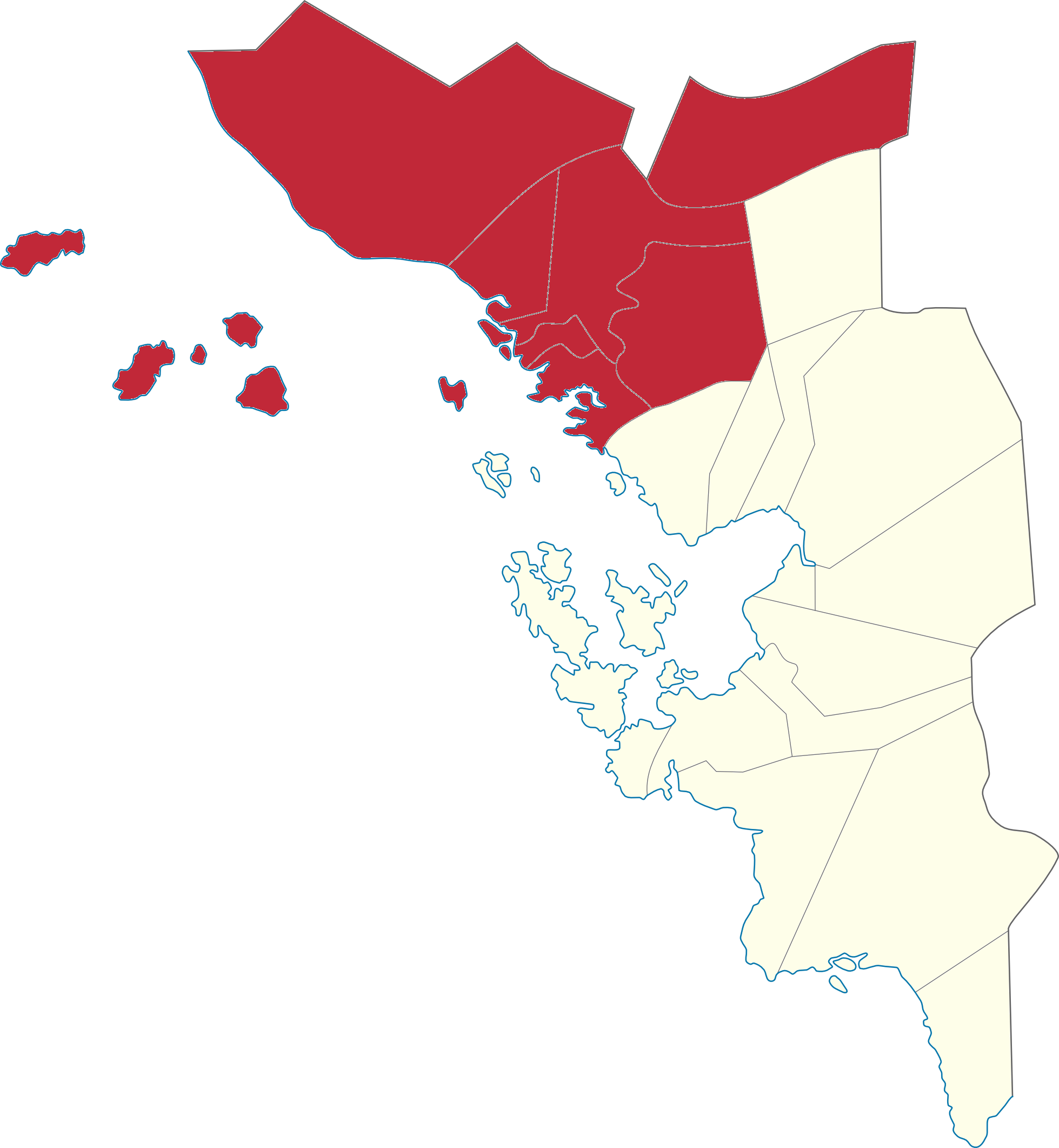
- Boundary of Samar's 1st congressional district in Samar

- Location of Samar within the Philippines
- Province: Samar
- Region: Eastern Visayas
- Population: 338,230 (2020)
- Electorate: 260,534 (2022)
- Major settlements: 10 LGUs: Cities; Calbayog; Municipalities; Almagro; Gandara; Matuguinao; Pagsanghan; San Jorge; Santa Margarita; Santo Niño; Tagapul-an; Tarangnan
- Area: 2,269.14 km^{2} (876.12 sq mi)

Current constituency
- Created: 1907
- Representative: Stephen James T. Tan
- Political party: Nacionalista
- Congressional bloc: Minority

Samar's 1st congressional district is one of the two congressional districts of the Philippines in the province of Samar. It has been represented in the House of Representatives of the Philippines since 1916 and earlier in the Philippine Assembly from 1907 to 1916. The district consists of the city of Calbayog and adjacent municipalities of Almagro, Gandara, Matuguinao, Pagsanghan, San Jorge, Santa Margarita, Santo Niño, Tagapul-an and Tarangnan. It is currently represented in the 20th Congress by Stephen James T. Tan of the Nacionalista Party (NP).

Prior to its second dissolution in 1965 due to the split of the old province of Samar, the district consisted of the old province's northern municipalities of Allen, Bobon, Calbayog, Capul, Catarman, Catubig, Gamay, Laoang, Lapinig, Las Navas, Lavezares, Mondragon, Palapag, Pambujan, San Antonio, San Isidro, San Jose, and San Roque. Following the split, Calbayog became part of Western Samar (now known simply as Samar), while the remaining municipalities formed Northern Samar, with each new province gaining distinct representation.

== Representation history ==
#	Image	Member	Term of office		Legislature	Party	Electoral history	Constituent LGUs
#	Image	Member	Start	End	Legislature	Party	Electoral history	Constituent LGUs
=== Samar's 1st district for the Philippine Assembly ===
District created January 9, 1907.
1		Honorio Rosales	October 16, 1907	October 16, 1909	1st	Independent	Elected in 1907.	1907–1912; Allen, Bobon, Calbayog, Capul, Catarman, Catubig, Laoang, Lavezares, Mondragon, Oquendo, Palapag, Pambujan, San Antonio
2		Vicente M. Obieta	October 16, 1909	October 16, 1912	2nd	Nacionalista	Elected in 1909.	1907–1912; Allen, Bobon, Calbayog, Capul, Catarman, Catubig, Laoang, Lavezares, Mondragon, Oquendo, Palapag, Pambujan, San Antonio
3		Tomás Gómez	October 16, 1912	October 16, 1916	3rd	Nacionalista	Elected in 1912.	1912–1916; Allen, Bobon, Calbayog, Capul, Catarman, Catubig, Laoang, Lavezares, Mondragon, Oquendo, Palapag, Pambujan, San Antonio, Weyler
=== Samar's 1st district for the House of Representatives of the Philippine Islands ===
4		Pedro K. Mendiola	October 16, 1916	June 6, 1922	4th	Nacionalista	Elected in 1916.	1916–1935; Allen, Bobon, Calbayog, Capul, Catarman, Catubig, Laoang, Lavezares, Mondragon, Oquendo, Palapag, Pambujan, San Antonio, Weyler
4		Pedro K. Mendiola	October 16, 1916	June 6, 1922	5th	Nacionalista	Re-elected in 1919.	1916–1935; Allen, Bobon, Calbayog, Capul, Catarman, Catubig, Laoang, Lavezares, Mondragon, Oquendo, Palapag, Pambujan, San Antonio, Weyler
5		José Avelino	June 6, 1922	June 5, 1928	6th	Demócrata	Elected in 1922.	1916–1935; Allen, Bobon, Calbayog, Capul, Catarman, Catubig, Laoang, Lavezares, Mondragon, Oquendo, Palapag, Pambujan, San Antonio, Weyler
5		José Avelino	June 6, 1922	June 5, 1928	7th	Demócrata	Re-elected in 1925.	1916–1935; Allen, Bobon, Calbayog, Capul, Catarman, Catubig, Laoang, Lavezares, Mondragon, Oquendo, Palapag, Pambujan, San Antonio, Weyler
6		Tiburcio Tancinco	June 5, 1928	June 5, 1934	8th	Nacionalista; Consolidado	Elected in 1928.	1916–1935; Allen, Bobon, Calbayog, Capul, Catarman, Catubig, Laoang, Lavezares, Mondragon, Oquendo, Palapag, Pambujan, San Antonio, Weyler
6		Tiburcio Tancinco	June 5, 1928	June 5, 1934	9th	Nacionalista; Consolidado	Re-elected in 1931.	1916–1935; Allen, Bobon, Calbayog, Capul, Catarman, Catubig, Laoang, Lavezares, Mondragon, Oquendo, Palapag, Pambujan, San Antonio, Weyler
7		Antolin D. Tan	June 5, 1934	September 16, 1935	10th	Nacionalista; Demócrata Pro-Independencia	Elected in 1934.	1916–1935; Allen, Bobon, Calbayog, Capul, Catarman, Catubig, Laoang, Lavezares, Mondragon, Oquendo, Palapag, Pambujan, San Antonio, Weyler
#	Image	Member	Term of office		National Assembly	Party	Electoral history	Constituent LGUs
#	Image	Member	Start	End	National Assembly	Party	Electoral history	Constituent LGUs
=== Samar's 1st district for the National Assembly (Commonwealth of the Philippines) ===
(6)		Tiburcio Tancinco	September 16, 1935	December 30, 1938	1st	Nacionalista; Democrático	Elected in 1935.	1935–1941; Allen, Bobon, Calbayog, Capul, Catarman, Catubig, Laoang, Lavezares, Mondragon, Oquendo, Palapag, Pambujan, San Antonio, Weyler
8		Agripino P. Escareal	December 30, 1938	December 30, 1941	2nd	Nacionalista	Elected in 1938.	1935–1941; Allen, Bobon, Calbayog, Capul, Catarman, Catubig, Laoang, Lavezares, Mondragon, Oquendo, Palapag, Pambujan, San Antonio, Weyler
District dissolved into the two-seat Samar's at-large district for the National Assembly (Second Philippine Republic).
#	Image	Member	Term of office		Common wealth Congress	Party	Electoral history	Constituent LGUs
#	Image	Member	Start	End	Common wealth Congress	Party	Electoral history	Constituent LGUs
=== Samar's 1st district for the House of Representatives of the Commonwealth of the Philippines ===
District re-created May 24, 1945.
9		Decoroso Rosales	June 11, 1945	May 25, 1946	1st	Nacionalista	Elected in 1941.	1945–1946; Allen, Bobon, Calbayog, Capul, Catarman, Catubig, Laoang, Lavezares, Mondragon, Oquendo, Palapag, Pambujan, San Antonio, Weyler
#	Image	Member	Term of office		Congress	Party	Electoral history	Constituent LGUs
#	Image	Member	Start	End	Congress	Party	Electoral history	Constituent LGUs
=== Samar's 1st district for the House of Representatives of the Philippines ===
(8)		Agripino P. Escareal	May 25, 1946	December 30, 1953	1st	Liberal	Elected in 1946.	1946–1949; Allen, Bobon, Calbayog, Capul, Catarman, Catubig, Laoang, Lavezares, Mondragon, Oquendo, Palapag, Pambujan, San Antonio, Weyler
(8)		Agripino P. Escareal	May 25, 1946	December 30, 1953	2nd	Liberal	Re-elected in 1949.	1949–1957; Allen, Bobon, Calbayog, Capul, Catarman, Catubig, Gamay, Laoang, Las Navas, Lavezares, Mondragon, Palapag, Pambujan, San Antonio, San Jose
10		Gregorio Bienvenido V. Tan	December 30, 1953	November 4, 1954	3rd	Nacionalista	Elected in 1953. Died.	1949–1957; Allen, Bobon, Calbayog, Capul, Catarman, Catubig, Gamay, Laoang, Las Navas, Lavezares, Mondragon, Palapag, Pambujan, San Antonio, San Jose
11		Eladio T. Balite	November 8, 1955	December 30, 1965	3rd	Nacionalista	Elected in 1955 to finish Tan's term.	1949–1957; Allen, Bobon, Calbayog, Capul, Catarman, Catubig, Gamay, Laoang, Las Navas, Lavezares, Mondragon, Palapag, Pambujan, San Antonio, San Jose
11		Eladio T. Balite	November 8, 1955	December 30, 1965	4th	Nacionalista	Re-elected in 1957.	1957–1961; Allen, Bobon, Calbayog, Capul, Catarman, Catubig, Gamay, Laoang, Lapinig, Las Navas, Lavezares, Mondragon, Palapag, Pambujan, San Antonio, San Isidro, San Jose
11		Eladio T. Balite	November 8, 1955	December 30, 1965	5th	Liberal	Re-elected in 1961. Redistricted to Northern Samar's at-large district.	1961–1965; Allen, Bobon, Calbayog, Capul, Catarman, Catubig, Gamay, Laoang, Lapinig, Las Navas, Lavezares, Mondragon, Palapag, Pambujan, San Antonio, San Isidro, San Jose, San Roque
District dissolved into Northern Samar's at-large district and Western Samar's at-large district.
District re-created February 2, 1987.
12		Jose A. Roño	June 30, 1987	June 30, 1992	8th	KBL	Elected in 1987.	1987–present Almagro, Calbayog, Gandara, Matuguinao, Pagsanghan, San Jorge, Santa Margarita, Santo Niño, Tagapul-an, Tarangnan
13		Rodolfo T. Tuazon	June 30, 1992	June 30, 2001	9th	Lakas	Elected in 1992.	1987–present Almagro, Calbayog, Gandara, Matuguinao, Pagsanghan, San Jorge, Santa Margarita, Santo Niño, Tagapul-an, Tarangnan
13		Rodolfo T. Tuazon	June 30, 1992	June 30, 2001	10th	Lakas	Re-elected in 1995.	1987–present Almagro, Calbayog, Gandara, Matuguinao, Pagsanghan, San Jorge, Santa Margarita, Santo Niño, Tagapul-an, Tarangnan
13		Rodolfo T. Tuazon	June 30, 1992	June 30, 2001	11th	LAMMP	Re-elected in 1998.	1987–present Almagro, Calbayog, Gandara, Matuguinao, Pagsanghan, San Jorge, Santa Margarita, Santo Niño, Tagapul-an, Tarangnan
14		Reynaldo S. Uy	June 30, 2001	June 30, 2010	12th	Liberal	Elected in 2001.	1987–present Almagro, Calbayog, Gandara, Matuguinao, Pagsanghan, San Jorge, Santa Margarita, Santo Niño, Tagapul-an, Tarangnan
14		Reynaldo S. Uy	June 30, 2001	June 30, 2010	13th	Liberal	Re-elected in 2004.	1987–present Almagro, Calbayog, Gandara, Matuguinao, Pagsanghan, San Jorge, Santa Margarita, Santo Niño, Tagapul-an, Tarangnan
14		Reynaldo S. Uy	June 30, 2001	June 30, 2010	14th	Lakas	Re-elected in 2007.	1987–present Almagro, Calbayog, Gandara, Matuguinao, Pagsanghan, San Jorge, Santa Margarita, Santo Niño, Tagapul-an, Tarangnan
15		Mel Senen Sarmiento	June 30, 2010	September 11, 2015	15th	Liberal	Elected in 2010.	1987–present Almagro, Calbayog, Gandara, Matuguinao, Pagsanghan, San Jorge, Santa Margarita, Santo Niño, Tagapul-an, Tarangnan
15		Mel Senen Sarmiento	June 30, 2010	September 11, 2015	16th	Liberal	Re-elected in 2013. Resigned on appointment as Secretary of the Interior and Local Government.	1987–present Almagro, Calbayog, Gandara, Matuguinao, Pagsanghan, San Jorge, Santa Margarita, Santo Niño, Tagapul-an, Tarangnan
16		Edgar Mary Sarmiento	June 30, 2016	June 30, 2022	17th	Liberal	Elected in 2016.	1987–present Almagro, Calbayog, Gandara, Matuguinao, Pagsanghan, San Jorge, Santa Margarita, Santo Niño, Tagapul-an, Tarangnan
16		Edgar Mary Sarmiento	June 30, 2016	June 30, 2022	18th	NUP	Re-elected in 2019.	1987–present Almagro, Calbayog, Gandara, Matuguinao, Pagsanghan, San Jorge, Santa Margarita, Santo Niño, Tagapul-an, Tarangnan
17		Stephen James T. Tan	June 30, 2022	Incumbent	19th	Nacionalista	Elected in 2022.	1987–present Almagro, Calbayog, Gandara, Matuguinao, Pagsanghan, San Jorge, Santa Margarita, Santo Niño, Tagapul-an, Tarangnan
17		Stephen James T. Tan	June 30, 2022	Incumbent	20th	Nacionalista	Re-elected in 2025.	1987–present Almagro, Calbayog, Gandara, Matuguinao, Pagsanghan, San Jorge, Santa Margarita, Santo Niño, Tagapul-an, Tarangnan

== Election results ==
=== 2025 ===
Candidate	Party	Votes	%
Stephen James Tan (incumbent)	Nacionalista Party	203,330	100.00
Total		203,330	100.00
Valid votes		203,330	88.59
Invalid/blank votes		26,189	11.41
Total votes		229,519	100.00
Registered voters/turnout		289,756	79.21
Nacionalista Party hold			
Source: Commission on Elections

=== 2022 ===
2022 Philippine House of Representatives elections
Party	Candidate	Votes	%
Nacionalista	Stephen James "Jimboy" Tan	132,436	
NUP	Edgar Mary Sarmiento	92,561	
Total votes			100.00%
Nacionalista gain from NUP			

=== 2019 ===
2019 Philippine House of Representatives elections
Party	Candidate	Votes	%
NUP	Edgar Sarmiento (incumbent)	103,884	
Nacionalista	Stephen James Tan	92,473	
Total votes			100.00%
NUP hold			

=== 2016 ===
2016 Philippine House of Representatives elections
Party	Candidate	Votes	%
Liberal	Edgar Sarmiento	86,115	51.86%
Nacionalista	Monmon Uy	77,548	46.70%
Independent	Irma Sarmiento	2,401	1.45%
Valid ballots		166,064	89.33%
Margin of victory		8,567	5.16%
Invalid or blank votes		19,843	10.67%
Total votes		185,907	100.00%
Liberal hold			

=== 2013 ===
2013 Philippine House of Representatives elections
Party	Candidate	Votes	%
Liberal	Mel Senen Sarmiento	51,335	52.71
Nacionalista	Arnold Tan	30,662	31.48
Independent	Antolin Tan	771	0.79
Margin of victory		20,673	21.23%
Invalid or blank votes		14,624	15.02
Total votes		97,392	100.00
Liberal hold			

=== 2010 ===
2010 Philippine House of Representatives elections
Party	Candidate	Votes	%
Lakas–Kampi	Mel Senen Sarmiento	82,787	56.81
Nacionalista	Rodolfo Tuazon	52,572	36.07
Independent	Rodrigo Tuazon	5,731	3.93
Independent	Alex Tuazon	2,766	1.90
NPC	Mario Roño	1,879	1.29
Valid ballots		145,735	93.74
Invalid or blank votes		9,740	6.26
Total votes		155,475	100,00
Lakas–Kampi hold			

== See also ==
- Legislative districts of Samar
