= Samar Sea =

Sea within the Philippine archipelago

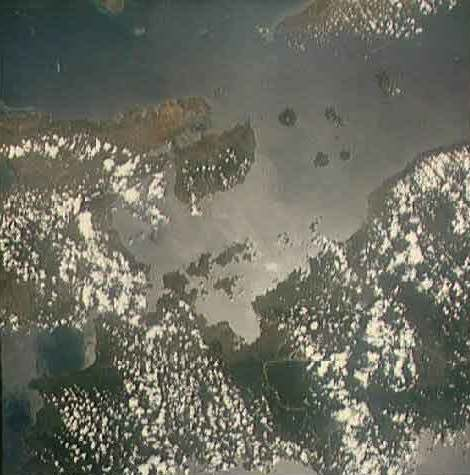
- The sea seen from space (north is towards the right)

- Location within the Philippines Samar Sea (Philippines)
- Location: Bicol Region; Eastern Visayas
- Coordinates: 11°49′30″N 124°30′00″E
- Type: sea
- Etymology: Samar

The Samar Sea is a small sea within the Philippine archipelago, situated between the Bicol Region of Luzon and the Eastern Visayas.

It is bordered by the islands of Samar to the east, Leyte to the south, Masbate to the west, and Luzon to the north. The sea is connected to the Philippine Sea to the north via San Bernardino Strait, to Leyte Gulf to the southeast via San Juanico Strait, to the Visayan Sea to the southwest, and to the Sibuyan Sea to the northwest via Masbate Pass and Ticao Pass. It contains Biliran Island, the islands of Almagro, Maripipi, Sto. Nino, Daram, and Tagapul-an.

The Samar Sea has experienced a significant degradation of marine resources, that is even characterized as "ecocide". Before 1981, there were 50 commercial fish species, but within 10 years, it was reduced to only 10 due to overfishing and destructive fishing methods (like dynamite fishing). Average daily catch has reduced from 30 kg/day in the 1960s, to 8 kg/day in 1981, to 3.5 kg/day in 1991. Having depleted the large predatory fish, fishermen turned to smaller species, allowing jellyfish populations to explode.

Deforestation of surrounding lands has led to increased silt from denuded mountains that choke coral reefs. Only some 5% of reefs are considered to be in a healthy condition. Another result of the increased silt are red tides, causing paralytic shellfish poisonings. The first red tide in the Philippines occurred in the Samar Sea in 1983 and thereafter continued to occur at irregular intervals.
