= Pagsanghan =

Municipality in Samar, Philippines

- Municipality
- Municipality of Pagsanghan
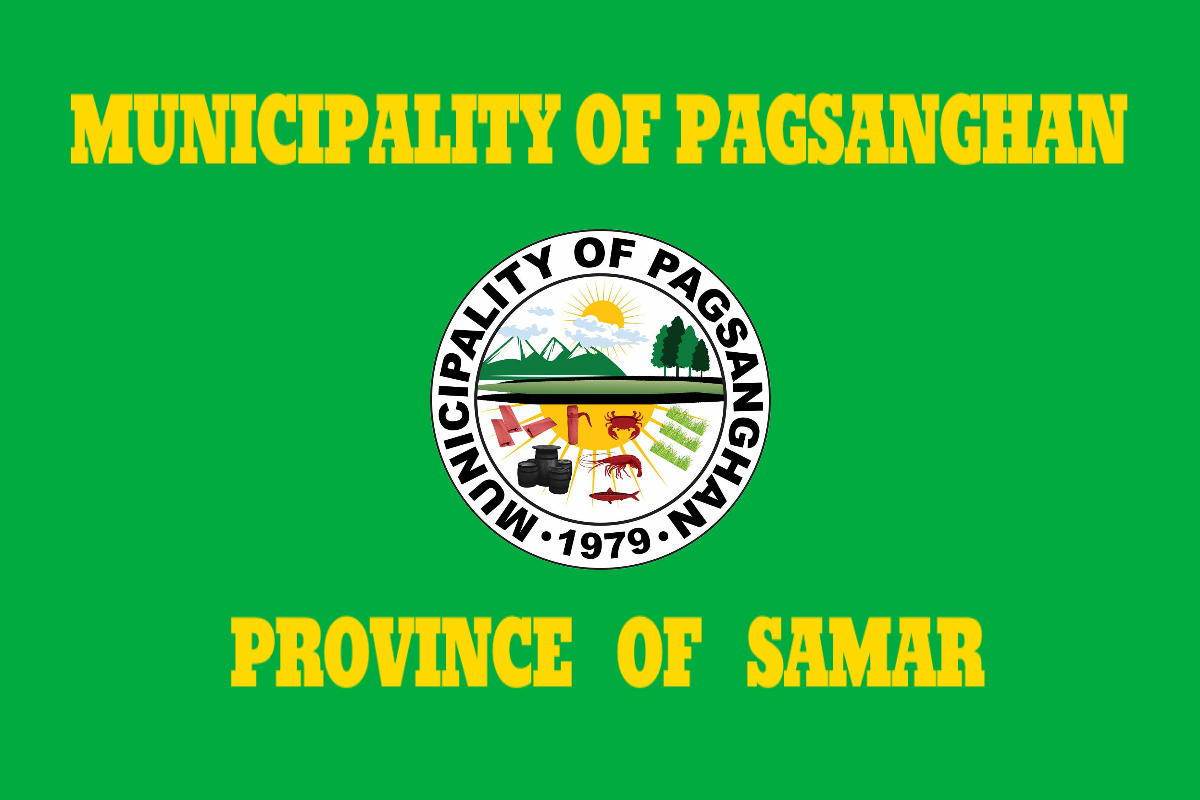
- Flag

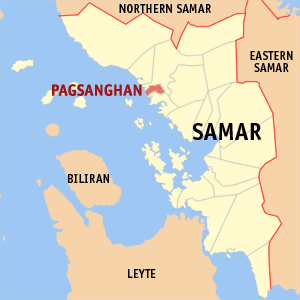
- Map of Samar with Pagsanghan highlighted
- Interactive map of Pagsanghan
- Location within the Philippines
- Coordinates: 11°57′54″N 124°43′17″E
- Country: Philippines
- Region: Eastern Visayas
- Province: Samar
- District: 1st district
- Founded: 1979
- Barangays: 13 (see Barangays)

Government
  - Type: Sangguniang Bayan
  - Mayor: Sed Hendrix Tan
  - Vice Mayor: Bienvenida P. Repol
  - Representative: Stephen James Tan
  - Councilors: List: • Domingo H. Ceracas; • Recto M. Tan; • Alfredo T. Deloyola; • Jim C. Canones; • Bernardo C. Uy; • Angeles U. Tan; • Alicia U. Repol; • Felisa U. Tarrayo; DILG Masterlist of Officials
  - Electorate: 8,065 voters (2025)

Area
  - Total: 30.00 km^{2} (11.58 sq mi)
- Elevation: 14 m (46 ft)
- Highest elevation: 186 m (610 ft)
- Lowest elevation: −1 m (−3.3 ft)

Population (2024 census)
  - Total: 8,145
  - Density: 271.5/km^{2} (703.2/sq mi)
  - Households: 1,954

Economy
  - Income class: 5th municipal income class
  - Poverty incidence: 29.49% (2023)
  - Revenue: ₱ 81.05 million (2024)
  - Assets: ₱ 208.6 million (2024)
  - Expenditure: ₱ 83.56 million (2024)
  - Liabilities: ₱ 54.45 million (2024)

Service provider
  - Electricity: Samar 1 Electric Cooperative (SAMELCO 1)
- Time zone: UTC+8 (PST)
- ZIP code: 6705
- PSGC: 0806026000
- IDD : area code: +63 (0)55
- Native languages: Waray; Tagalog
- Website: www.pagsanghan-samar.gov.ph

Pagsanghan, officially the Municipality of Pagsanghan (Waray: Bungto han Pagsanghan; Tagalog: Bayan ng Pagsanghan), is a municipality in the province of Samar, Philippines. According to the 2024 census, it has a population of 8,145 people.

== History ==
The municipality of Pagsanghan was established by virtue of Batas Pambansa Blg. 16 issued on February 9, 1979, upon separation of nine barangays in Tarangnan, with a barangay with the same name the seat of government. A plebiscite was held on April 3.

== Geography ==
=== Barangays ===
Pagsanghan is politically subdivided into 13 barangays. Each barangay consists of puroks and some have sitios.

- Bangon
- Buenos Aires
- Calanyugan
- Caloloma (Rawis)
- Cambaye
- Canlapwas (Poblacion)
- Libertad (Poblacion)
- Pange
- San Luis
- Santo Niño (Poblacion)
- Viejo (Poblacion)
- Villahermosa Occidental
- Villahermosa Oriental

=== Climate ===
Climate data for Pagsanghan, Samar
Month	Jan	Feb	Mar	Apr	May	Jun	Jul	Aug	Sep	Oct	Nov	Dec	Year
Mean daily maximum °C (°F)	28 (82)	29 (84)	29 (84)	31 (88)	31 (88)	30 (86)	29 (84)	29 (84)	29 (84)	29 (84)	29 (84)	28 (82)	29 (85)
Mean daily minimum °C (°F)	21 (70)	21 (70)	21 (70)	22 (72)	24 (75)	24 (75)	24 (75)	25 (77)	24 (75)	24 (75)	23 (73)	22 (72)	23 (73)
Average precipitation mm (inches)	72 (2.8)	52 (2.0)	65 (2.6)	62 (2.4)	87 (3.4)	129 (5.1)	153 (6.0)	124 (4.9)	147 (5.8)	157 (6.2)	139 (5.5)	117 (4.6)	1,304 (51.3)
Average rainy days	17.4	13.4	16.8	18.0	22.0	25.3	26.2	24.2	24.9	26.0	23.3	20.8	258.3
Source: Meteoblue

== Demographics ==
Population census of Pagsanghan
Year	Pop.	±% p.a.
1980	6,512	—
1990	6,047	−0.74%
1995	7,350	+3.72%
2000	7,077	−0.81%
2007	7,981	+1.67%
2010	8,024	+0.20%
2015	7,945	−0.19%
2020	7,959	+0.04%
2024	8,145	+0.56%
Source: Philippine Statistics Authority

== Economy ==
Poverty incidence of Pagsanghan (%)

Source: Philippine Statistics Authority
