= Matuguinao =

Municipality in Samar, Philippines

- Municipality
- Municipality of Matuguinao
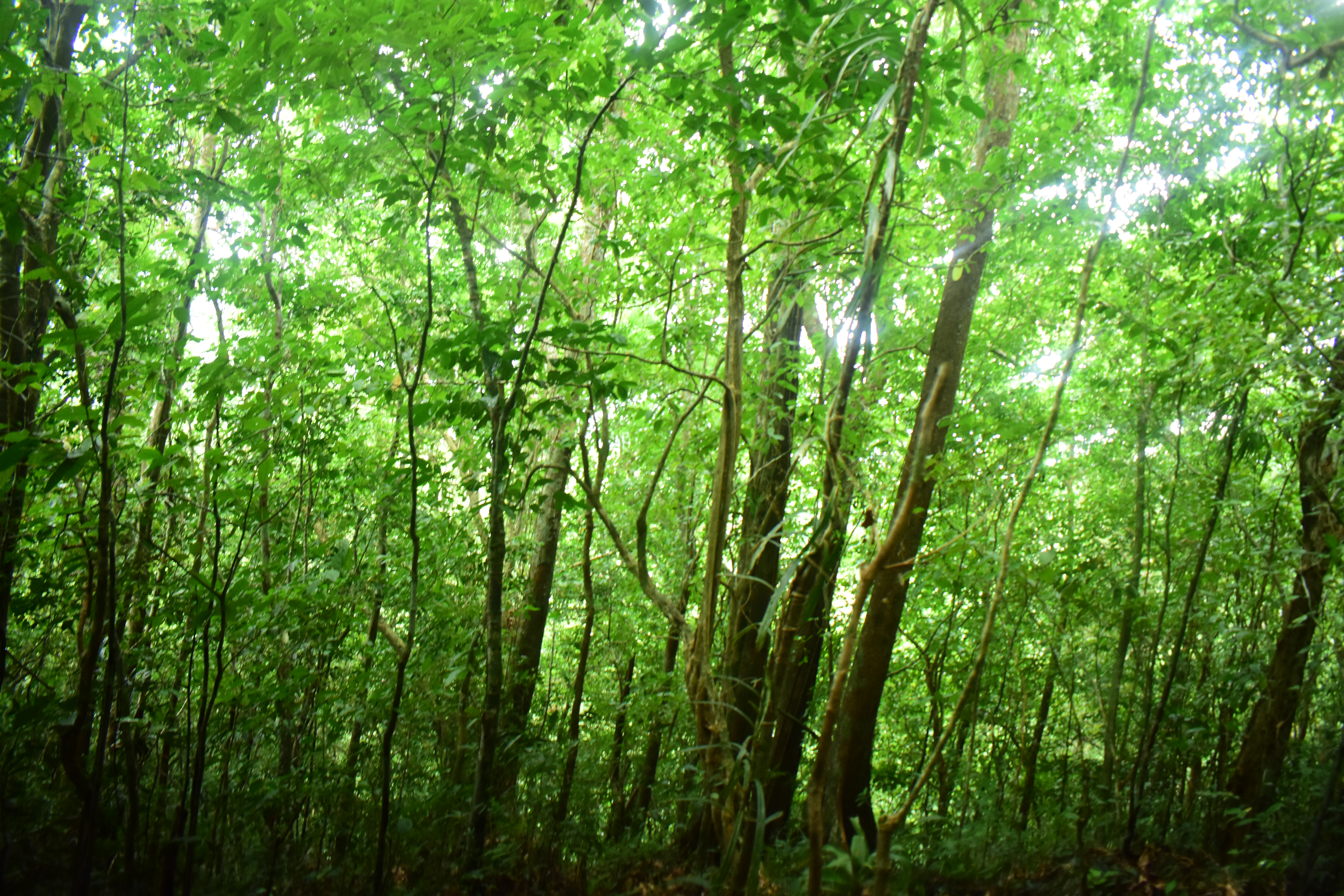
- Forest in Matuguinao

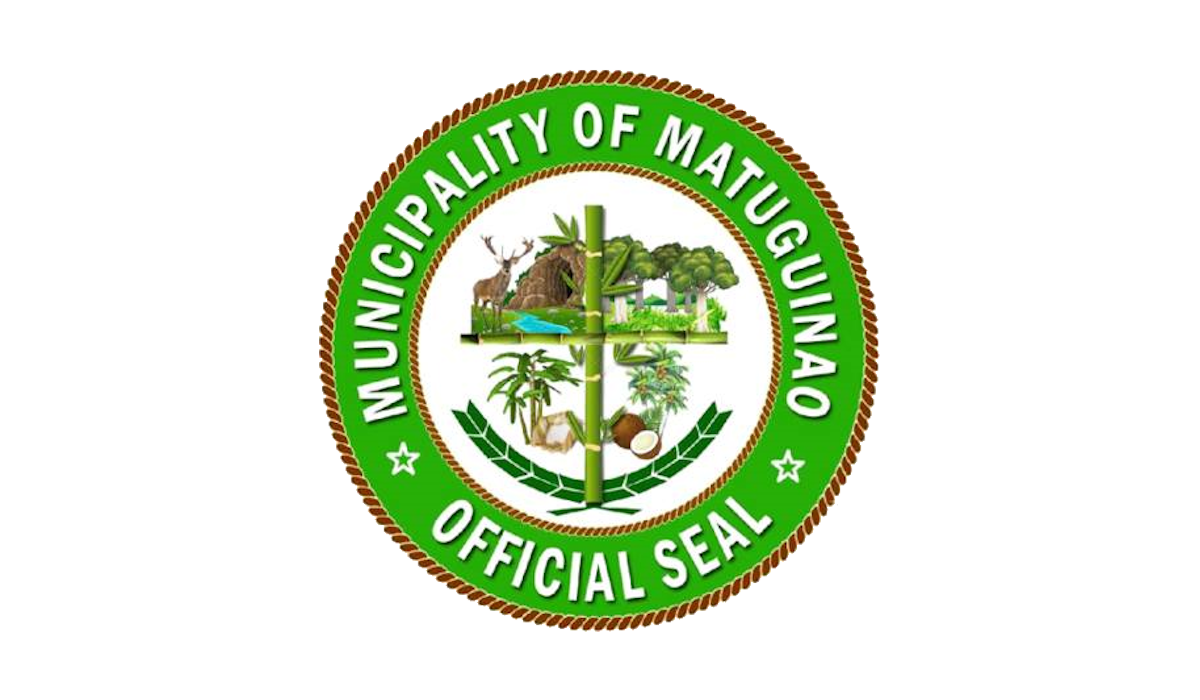
- Flag

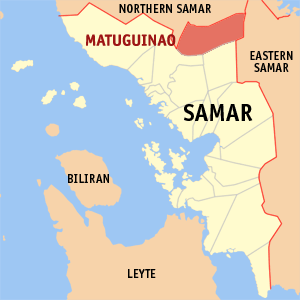
- Map of Samar with Matuguinao highlighted
- Interactive map of Matuguinao
- Location within the Philippines
- Coordinates: 12°09′N 124°53′E
- Country: Philippines
- Region: Eastern Visayas
- Province: Samar
- District: 1st district
- Founded: June 19, 1965
- Barangays: 20 (see Barangays)

Government
  - Type: Sangguniang Bayan
  - Mayor: Aran D. Boller
  - Vice Mayor: Cleofe D. Belonio
  - Representative: Stephen James Tan
  - Councilors: List: • Salvador B. Floquencio; • Valentin B. Morillo; • Cristina D. Doroja; • Sherly D. Loberando; • Marcial E. Quitalig; • Vilmar B. dela Cruz; • Jaime D. Velasco; • Bienvinida S. Velarde; DILG Masterlist of Officials
  - Electorate: 6,241 voters (2025)

Area
  - Total: 172.51 km^{2} (66.61 sq mi)
- Elevation: 188 m (617 ft)
- Highest elevation: 754 m (2,474 ft)
- Lowest elevation: 14 m (46 ft)

Population (2024 census)
  - Total: 7,708
  - Density: 44.68/km^{2} (115.7/sq mi)
  - Households: 1,545

Economy
  - Income class: 4th municipal income class
  - Poverty incidence: 41.19% (2023)
  - Revenue: ₱ 124.7 million (2024)
  - Assets: ₱ 283.6 million (2024)
  - Expenditure: ₱ 139.2 million (2024)
  - Liabilities: ₱ 120.4 million (2024)

Service provider
  - Electricity: Samar 1 Electric Cooperative (SAMELCO 1)
- Time zone: UTC+8 (PST)
- ZIP code: 6708
- PSGC: 0806011000
- IDD : area code: +63 (0)55
- Native languages: Waray; Tagalog

Matuguinao, officially the Municipality of Matuguinao (Waray: Bungto han Matuguinao; Tagalog: Bayan ng Matuguinao), is a municipality in the province of Samar, Philippines. According to the 2024 census, it has a population of 7,708 people, making it the least populated municipality in the province.

== Etymology ==
Matuguinao or Matugnaw is a Waray-Waray word that literally means cold.

== History ==
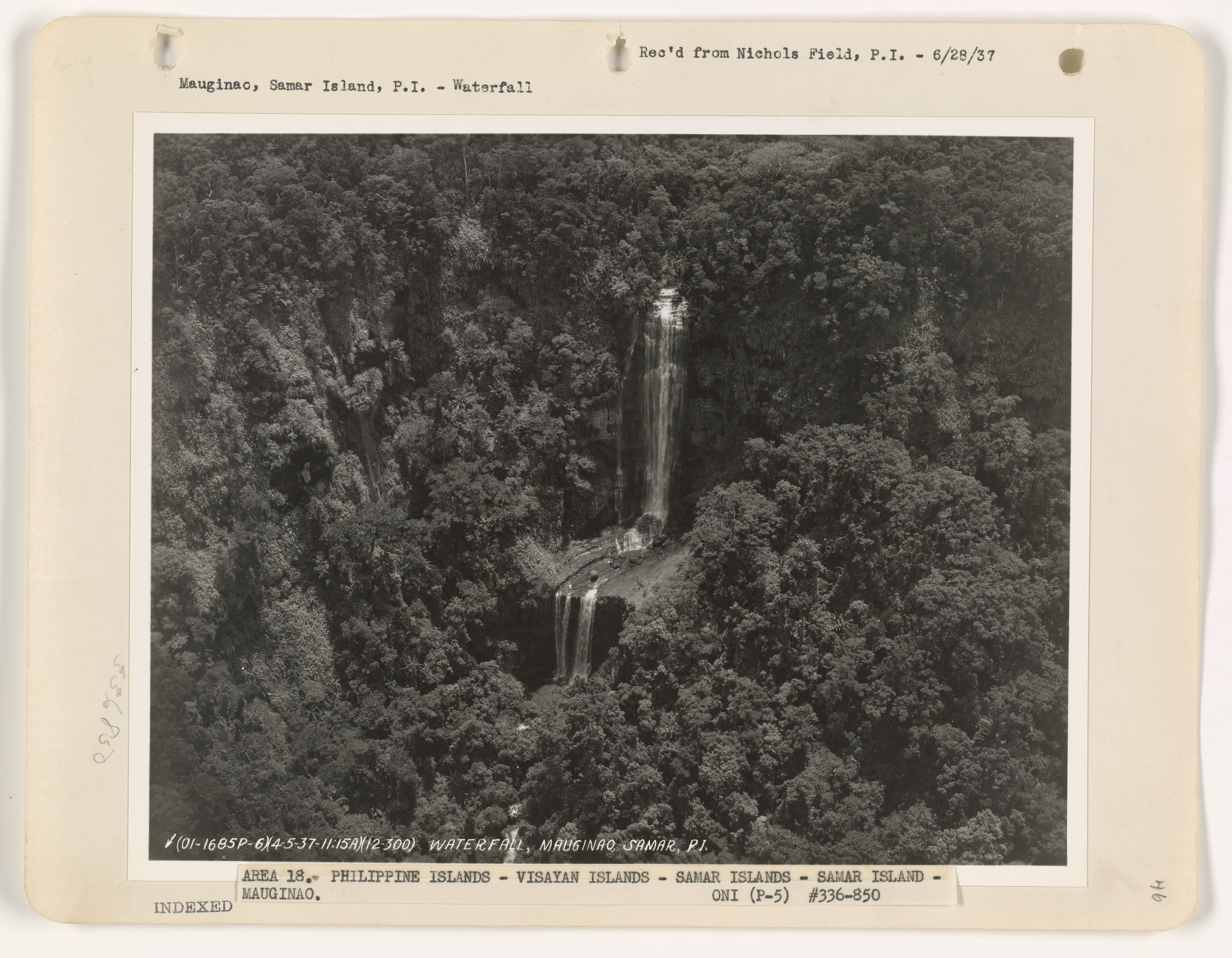
Waterfall in Matuguinao, 1937

Matuguinao was named as a municipal district of Gandara in the year 1948 to 1960. By virtue of Republic Act No. 4221, which divided the old province of Samar, it was later converted into a municipality and a part of the newly established province of Western Samar (now Samar) in 1965.

== Geography ==
=== Barangays ===
Matuguinao is politically subdivided into 20 barangays. Each barangay consists of puroks and some have sitios.

- Angyap
- Bag-otan
- Barruz (Barangay No. 1)
- Camonoan
- Carolina
- Deit
- Del Rosario
- Inubod
- Libertad
- Ligaya
- Mabuligon (Poblacion)
- Maduroto (Poblacion)
- Mahanud
- Mahayag
- Nagpapacao
- Rizal
- Salvacion
- San Isidro
- Santa Cruz
- San Roque (Mabuhay)

=== Climate ===
Climate data for Matuguinao
Month	Jan	Feb	Mar	Apr	May	Jun	Jul	Aug	Sep	Oct	Nov	Dec	Year
Mean daily maximum °C (°F)	28 (82)	29 (84)	29 (84)	31 (88)	31 (88)	30 (86)	29 (84)	29 (84)	29 (84)	29 (84)	29 (84)	28 (82)	29 (85)
Mean daily minimum °C (°F)	21 (70)	21 (70)	21 (70)	22 (72)	24 (75)	24 (75)	24 (75)	25 (77)	24 (75)	24 (75)	23 (73)	22 (72)	23 (73)
Average precipitation mm (inches)	72 (2.8)	52 (2.0)	65 (2.6)	62 (2.4)	87 (3.4)	129 (5.1)	153 (6.0)	124 (4.9)	147 (5.8)	157 (6.2)	139 (5.5)	117 (4.6)	1,304 (51.3)
Average rainy days	17.4	13.4	16.8	18.0	22.0	25.3	26.2	24.2	24.9	26.0	23.3	20.8	258.3
Source: Meteoblue

== Demographics ==
Population census of Matuguinao
Year	Pop.	±% p.a.
1939	896	—
1948	2,216	+10.58%
1960	1,818	−1.64%
1970	2,198	+1.91%
1975	3,942	+12.43%
1980	5,020	+4.95%
1990	3,819	−2.70%
1995	5,205	+5.97%
2000	5,361	+0.64%
2007	6,589	+2.89%
2010	6,746	+0.86%
2015	7,288	+1.48%
2020	7,364	+0.22%
2024	7,708	+1.10%
Source: Philippine Statistics Authority

== Economy ==
Poverty incidence of Matuguinao (%)

Source: Philippine Statistics Authority

== Infrastructure ==
Water and sanitation
Water is abundant in this town, with cold and hot water sources.

Solid Waste Management
Garbage are being collected here manually by a karitilya. It is dumped on its garbage dumpsite along the provincial road going to Matuguinao and after barangay Barruz.
