= Tarangnan =

Municipality in Samar, Philippines

- Municipality
- Municipality of Tarangnan
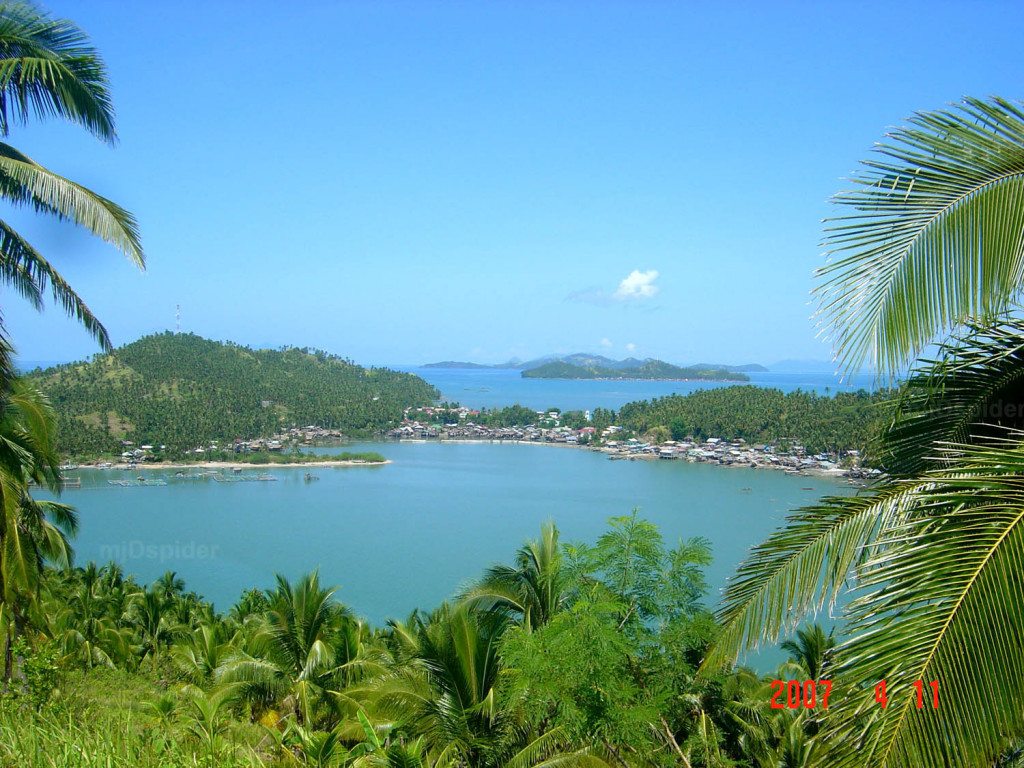
- Mountain-top view of Tarangnan

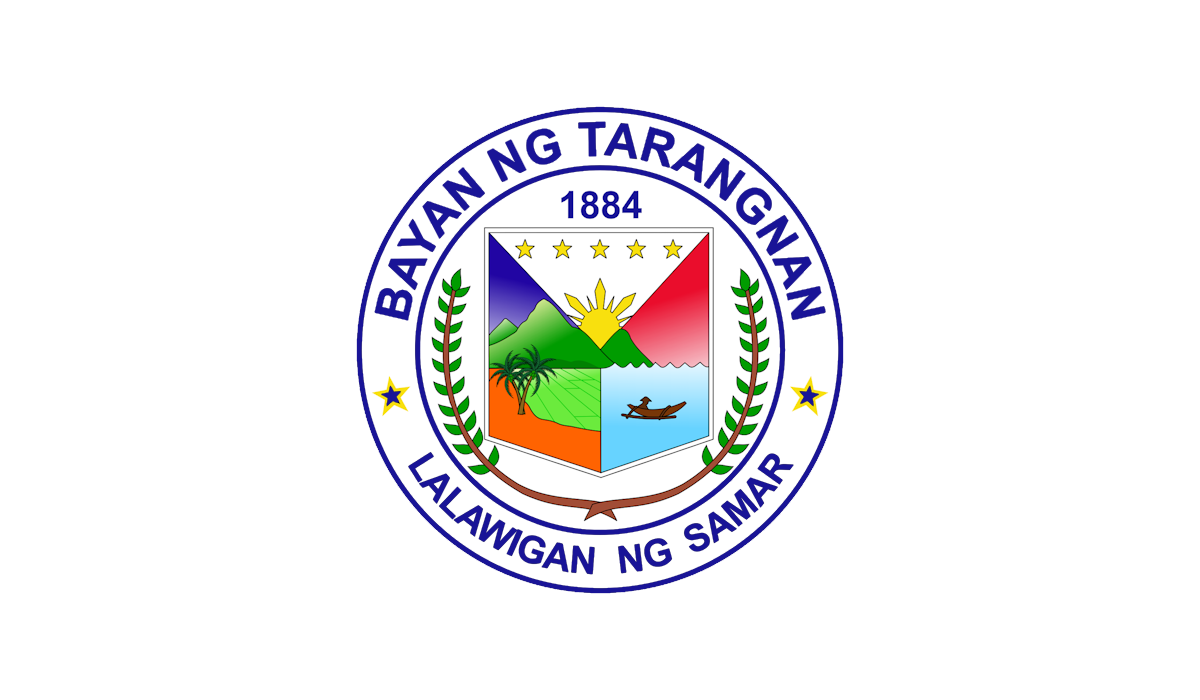
- Flag Seal

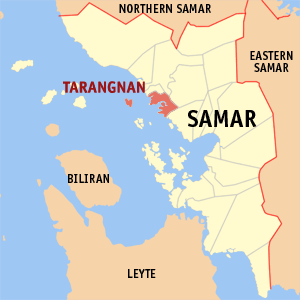
- Map of Samar with Tarangnan highlighted
- Interactive map of Tarangnan
- Location within the Philippines
- Coordinates: 11°54′N 124°45′E
- Country: Philippines
- Region: Eastern Visayas
- Province: Samar
- District: 1st district
- Founded: April 1, 1884
- Annexation to Catbalogan: October 23, 1903
- Chartered: October 31, 1906
- Barangays: 41 (see Barangays)

Government
  - Type: Sangguniang Bayan
  - Mayor: Danilo V. Tan
  - Vice Mayor: Arnel R. Tan
  - Representative: Stephen James Tan
  - Electorate: 21,871 voters (2025)

Area
  - Total: 132.49 km^{2} (51.15 sq mi)
- Elevation: 16 m (52 ft)
- Highest elevation: 335 m (1,099 ft)
- Lowest elevation: 0 m (0 ft)

Population (2024 census)
  - Total: 26,013
  - Density: 196.34/km^{2} (508.52/sq mi)
  - Households: 5,936

Economy
  - Income class: 3rd municipal income class
  - Poverty incidence: 33.44% (2023)
  - Revenue: ₱ 172.8 million (2024)
  - Assets: ₱ 326.1 million (2024)
  - Expenditure: ₱ 162.4 million (2024)
  - Liabilities: ₱ 22.94 million (2024)

Service provider
  - Electricity: Samar 1 Electric Cooperative (SAMELCO 1)
- Time zone: UTC+8 (PST)
- ZIP code: 6704
- PSGC: 0806020000
- IDD : area code: +63 (0)55
- Native languages: Waray; Tagalog

Tarangnan, officially the Municipality of Tarangnan (Waray: Bungto han Tarangnan; Tagalog: Bayan ng Tarangnan), is a municipality in the province of Samar, Philippines. According to the 2024 census, it has a population of 26,013 people.

Tarangnan is situated on the western coast of Samar Island, to the south-east of the ancient town of Bangahon (now Gandara) and to the north of Samar's capital Catbalogan. Tarangnan is found near the former ancient pueblo Tinago, the first town to be Christianized and was made a center or cabecera.

Tarangnan has its own municipal hospital which was inaugurated in 1982, with a 10-bed capacity. It is augmented by Rural Health Unit extension workers. It has daycare centers which also cater the needs of pre-schoolers.

== History ==
During the earlier part of the 17th century, Tarangnan or Tinago was the first settlement of Jesuit missionaries on the island of Samar. Tinago was the first cabecera on Samar where the first Jesuits have arrived, that is October 15, 1596. When Tinago was devastated by the Moro attack in 1616, the Jesuits decided to transfer the cabecera to Catbalogan. Since that time Tinago had not came back to life as pueblo until 1725. The poblacion was established at Dapdap but for access and sanitation it was moved to tarangnan in 1883–1884.

The attempted transfer of the pueblo from Dapdap to Tarangnan in 1882 became highly celebrated case. It was a struggle or a fight between the parish priest of Dapdap, fr. Angel Pulido, OFM and the governadorcillo of Dapdap.

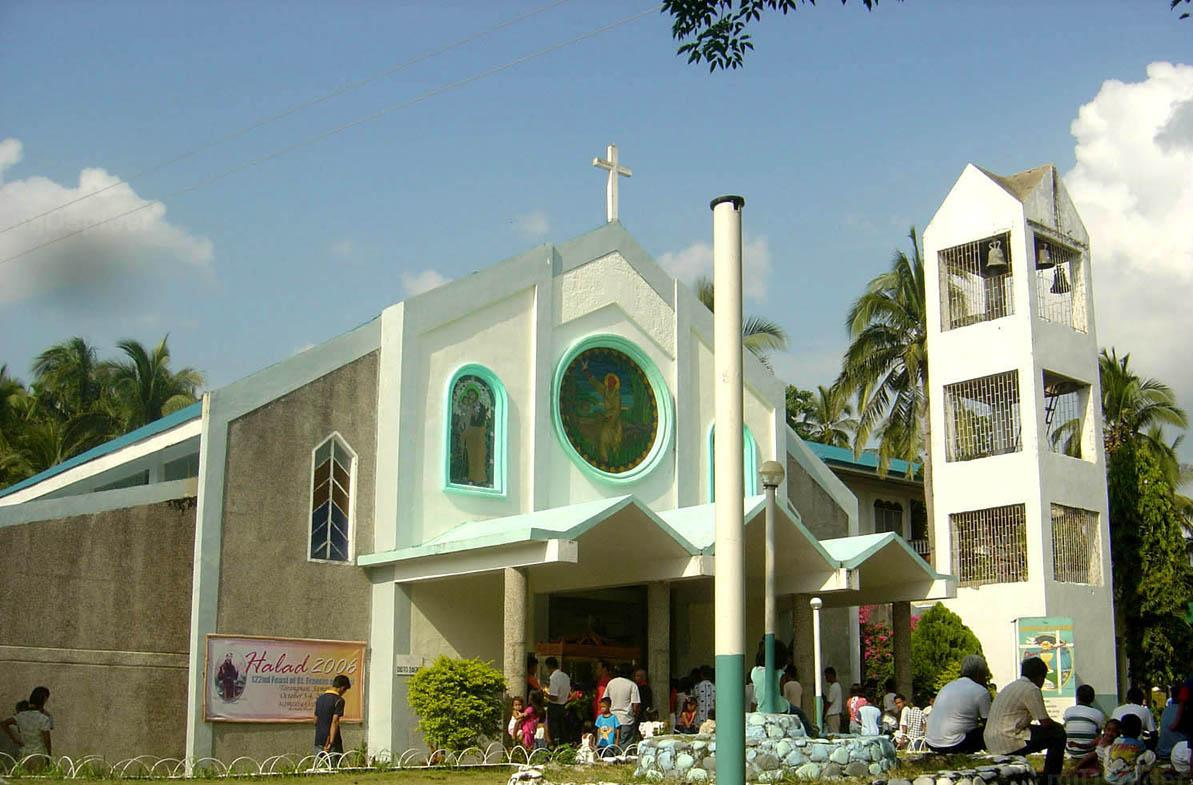
Tarangnan Church

The town of Dapdap was transferred in 1884 to a barrio called Tarangnan, from which it derived its name today. At first the church and convento were constructed of light materials which means bamboo and nipa. The new church was constructed in 1894 by P. Venancio Palencia, OFM and completed in 1897.

In the second half of the nineteenth century, the island of Samar experienced a commercial boom, especially in abaca, with imports and exports of abaca products. Moro raids in the island declined due to the presence of Spaniards. As the Spaniards settled in Samar, they saw the need of all-weather seaports and easy communications for their commercial activities and political administration. This development paved the way for the convergence of the inhabitants into the old town site of Tarangnan, where transport was relatively accessible. The settlement of Tarangnan was growing at a much faster pace than the pueblo of Dapdap.

Taking into consideration the island's commercial boom, with prospects of Tarangnan as a trading center and its religious vigilance over Dapdap, on June 21, 1881, Gov. Enrique Chacon wrote to his superiors. He recommended the transfer of the Poblacion from Dapdap to Tarangnan due to the former's poor accessibility, unavailability of land area for expansion, and its unsanitary environment.

On April 1, 1884, Tarangnan was declared as one of the municipalities of the Province of Samar by means of Royal Decree by the King of Spain, King Alfonso I.

On October 23, 1903, Tarangnan, except for its five barrios south of the Gandara River, was merged with Catbalogan by virtue of Act No. 960. It later restored its municipal status on October 31, 1906, by virtue of Act No. 1558.

In 1957, the following sitios were declared barrios: Cabunga-an, Tigdaranao, and Binalayan.

In 1979, by virtue of Batas Pambansa Blg. 16, nine barangays were separated to create the municipality of Pagsanghan.

== Geography ==
The municipality of Tarangnan is geographically situated in the west portion of the island of Samar, bounded on the north by the municipality of Pagsanghan, in the south by the capital city of Catbalogan and on the west by the Samar Sea or Maqueda Bay. The distance of the poblacion to Catbalogan is about 36 kilometres (22 mi) and 60 kilometres (37 mi) away from Calbayog. It can be reached via an 11 kilometres (6.8 mi) road from the Maharlika Highway crossing Barangay Balugo by a provincial road.

=== Barangays ===
Tarangnan is politically subdivided into 41 barangays. Each barangay consists of puroks and some have sitios.

- Alcazar
- Awang
- Bahay
- Balonga-as
- Balugo
- Bangon Gote
- Baras
- Binalayan
- Bisitahan
- Bonga
- Cabunga-an
- Cagtutulo
- Cambatutay Nuevo
- Cambatutay Viejo
- Canunghan
- Catan-agan
- Dapdap
- Gallego
- Imelda Pob. (Posgo)
- Lucerdoni (Irong-irong)
- Lahong
- Libucan Dacu
- Libucan Gote
- Majacob
- Mancares
- Marabut
- Oeste - A
- Oeste - B
- Pajo
- Palencia
- Poblacion A
- Poblacion B
- Poblacion C
- Poblacion D
- Poblacion E
- San Vicente
- Santa Cruz
- Sugod
- Talinga
- Tigdaranao
- Tizon

=== Climate ===
Climate data for Tarangnan, Samar
Month	Jan	Feb	Mar	Apr	May	Jun	Jul	Aug	Sep	Oct	Nov	Dec	Year
Mean daily maximum °C (°F)	28 (82)	29 (84)	29 (84)	31 (88)	31 (88)	30 (86)	29 (84)	29 (84)	29 (84)	29 (84)	29 (84)	28 (82)	29 (85)
Mean daily minimum °C (°F)	21 (70)	21 (70)	21 (70)	22 (72)	24 (75)	24 (75)	24 (75)	25 (77)	24 (75)	24 (75)	23 (73)	22 (72)	23 (73)
Average precipitation mm (inches)	72 (2.8)	52 (2.0)	65 (2.6)	62 (2.4)	87 (3.4)	129 (5.1)	153 (6.0)	124 (4.9)	147 (5.8)	157 (6.2)	139 (5.5)	117 (4.6)	1,304 (51.3)
Average rainy days	17.4	13.4	16.8	18.0	22.0	25.3	26.2	24.2	24.9	26.0	23.3	20.8	258.3
Source: Meteoblue

== Demographics ==
Population census of Tarangnan
Year	Pop.	±% p.a.
1903	6,184	—
1918	7,286	+1.10%
1939	11,605	+2.24%
1948	12,271	+0.62%
1960	15,984	+2.23%
1970	17,551	+0.94%
1975	19,489	+2.12%
1980	15,558	−4.40%
1990	15,894	+0.21%
1995	18,791	+3.19%
2000	20,538	+1.92%
2007	22,767	+1.43%
2010	24,146	+2.16%
2015	24,992	+0.66%
2020	25,713	+0.60%
2024	26,013	+0.28%
Source: Philippine Statistics Authority

== Economy ==
Poverty incidence of Tarangnan (%)

Source: Philippine Statistics Authority

== Education ==
Some years back, Tarangnan was estimated to have a low literacy rate. But, with the opening of primary education in some barangays and expansion of secondary education (Tarangnan National High School) in Barangay Oeste, its literacy rose dramatically to 89.95%, as recorded in the NSO 1995 survey.

- Tarangnan National High School
- Oeste National High School
- Tizon National High School
- Majacob Integrated School

== Gallery ==
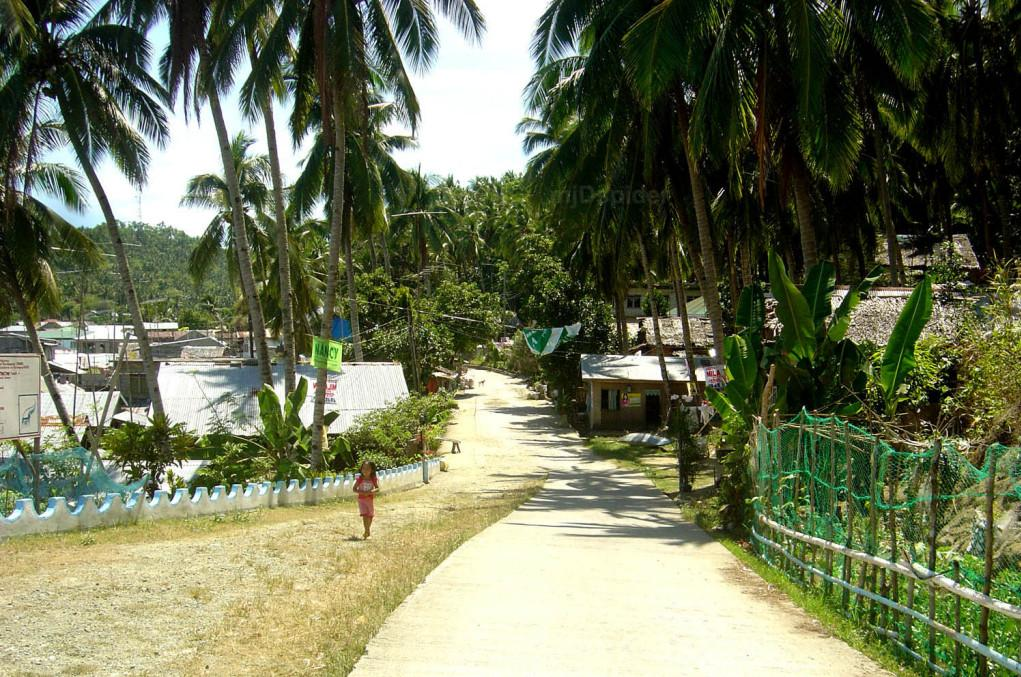
Entering Tarangnan Town Proper

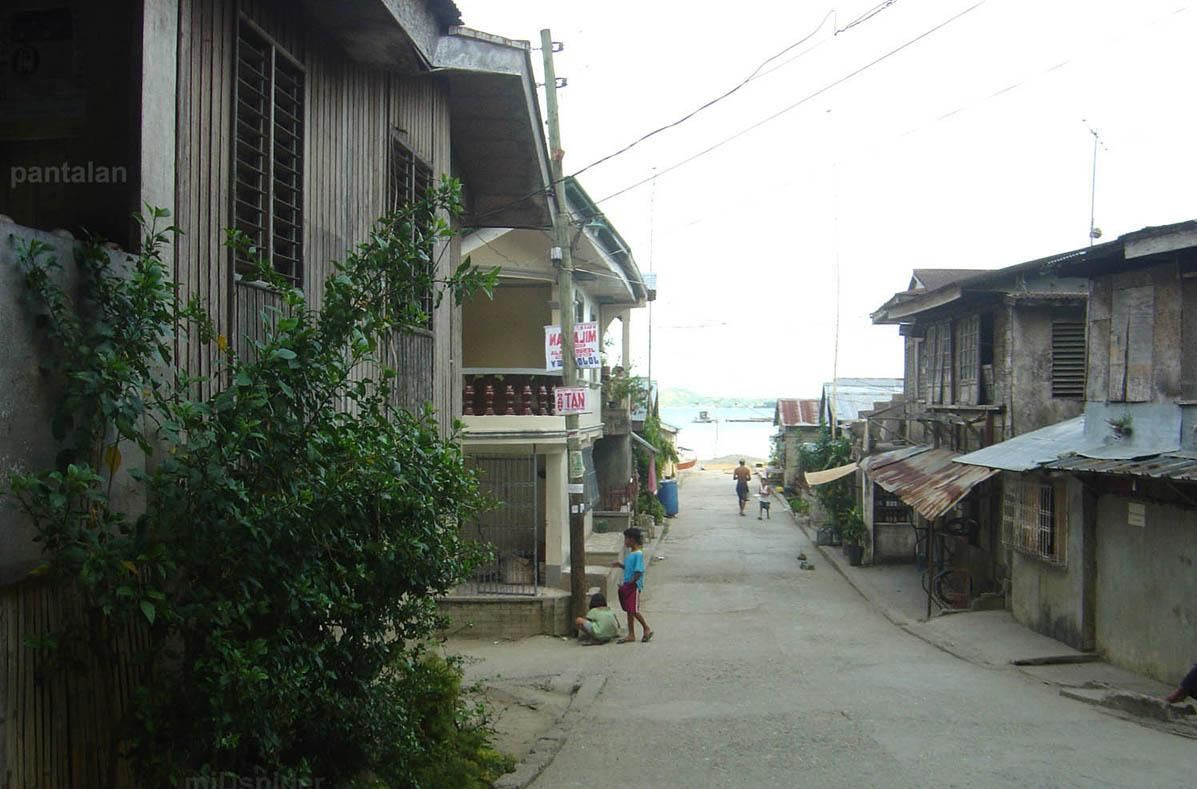
Going To Pantalan (Wharf)

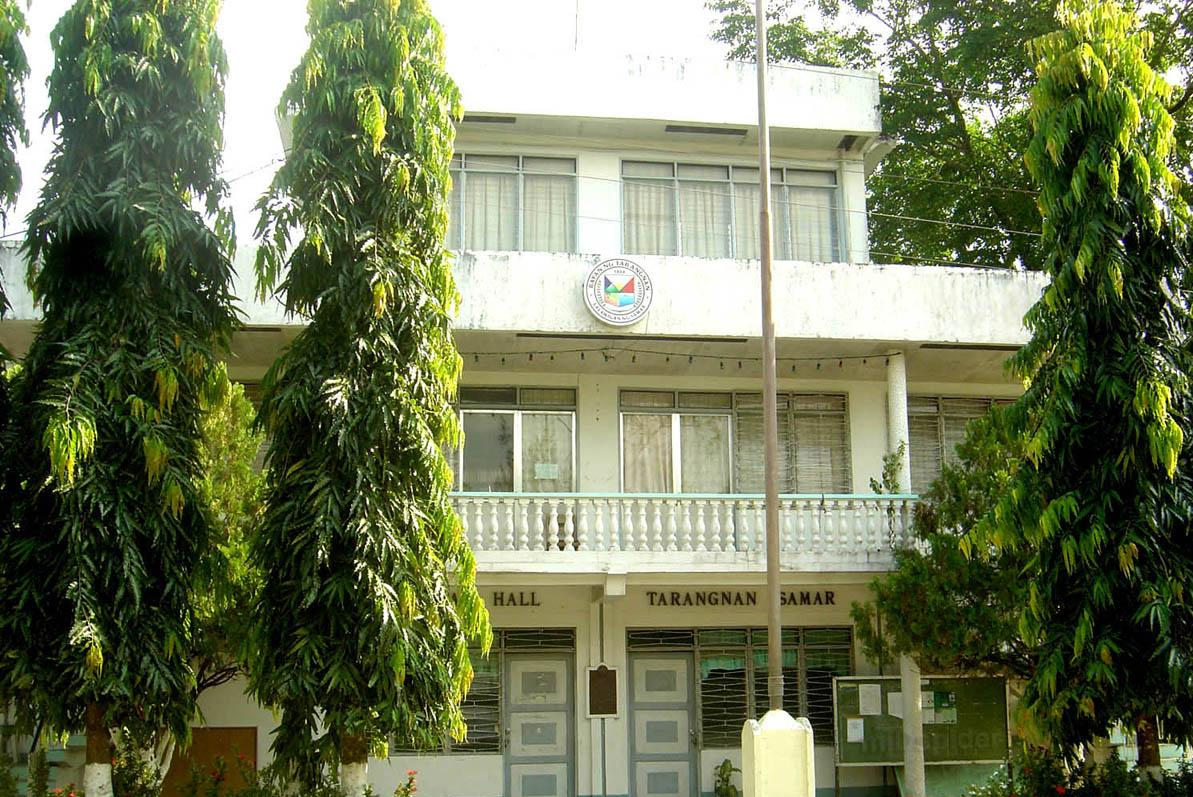
Town Hall

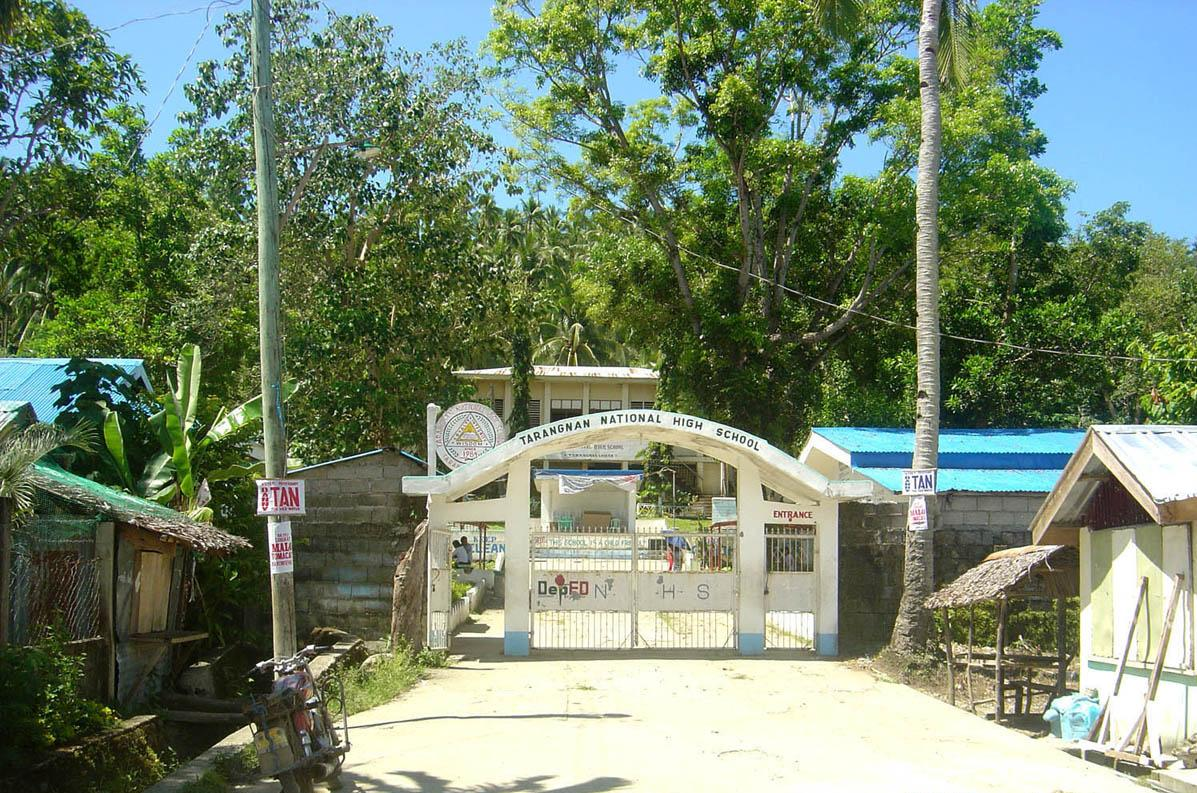
High School

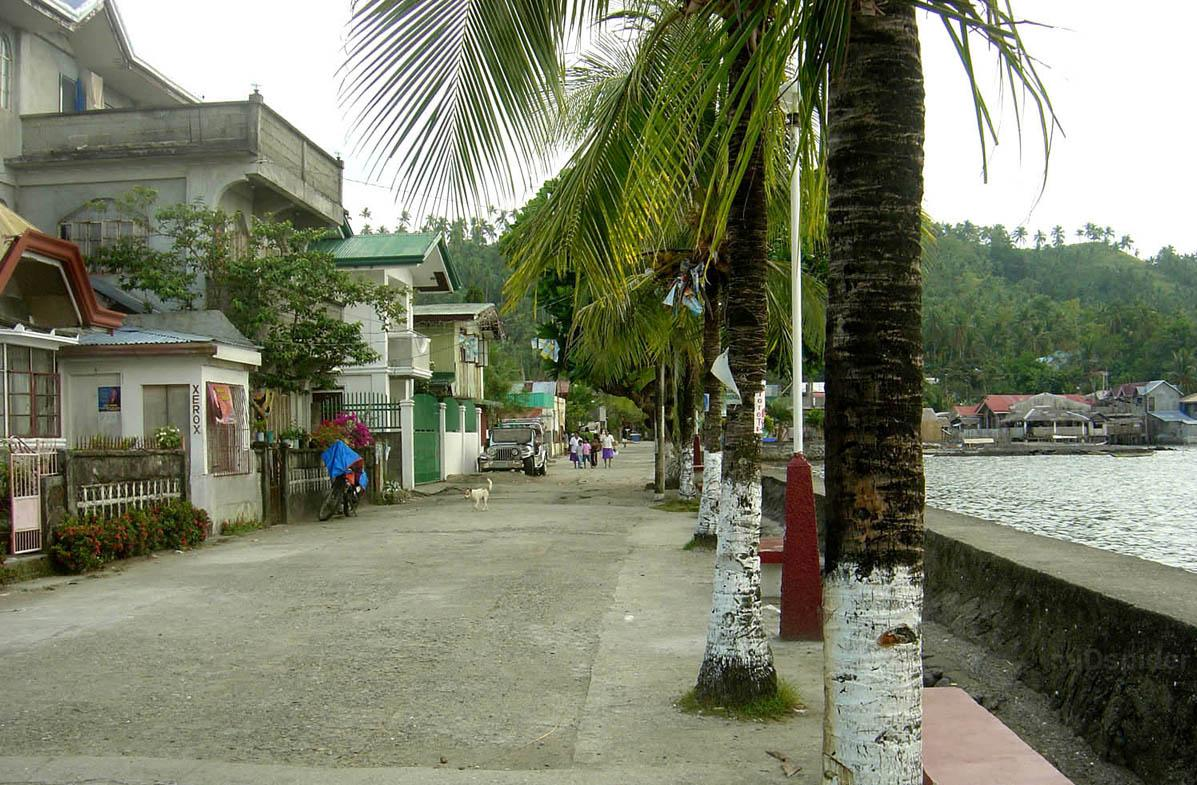
Sea Side

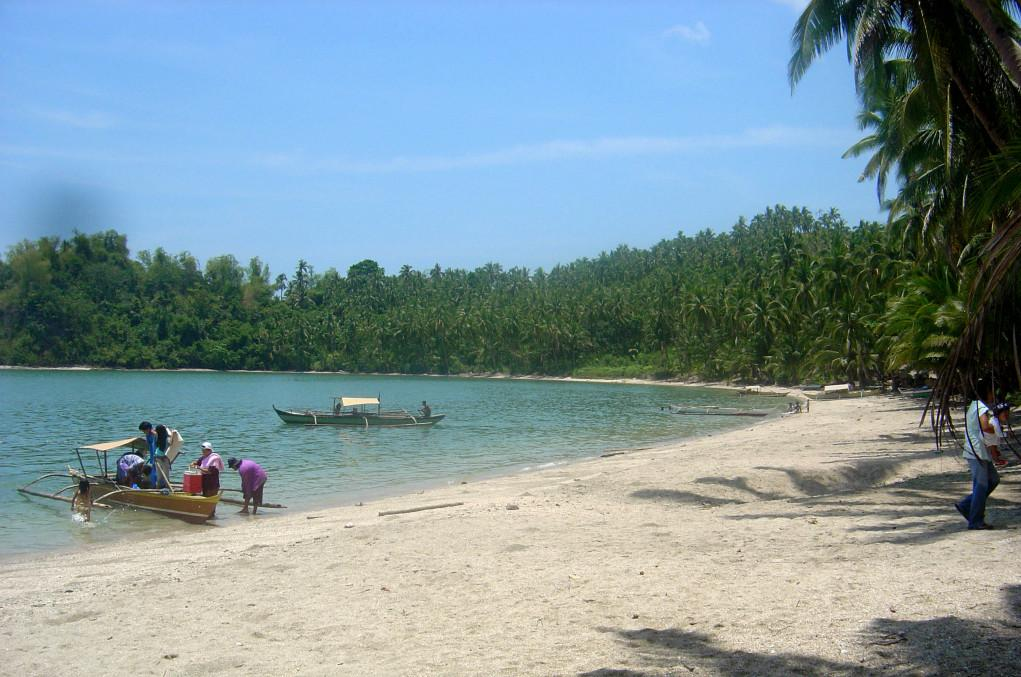
Panapukan Beach (one of the beaches)
