= Santa Margarita, Samar =

Municipality in Samar, Philippines

Santa Margarita Magsohong
- Municipality
- Municipality of Santa Margarita
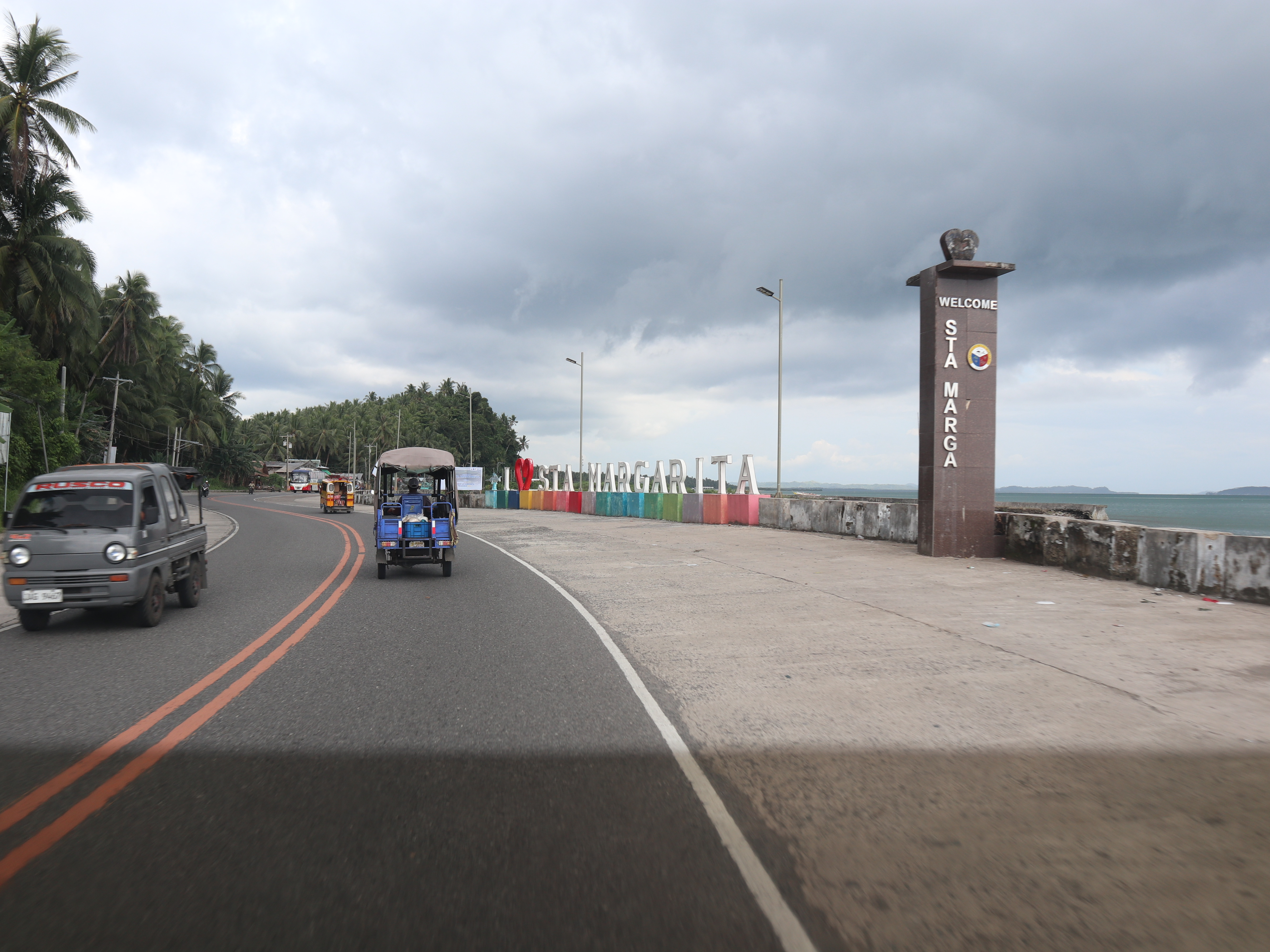
- Welcome marker at Pan-Philippine Highway

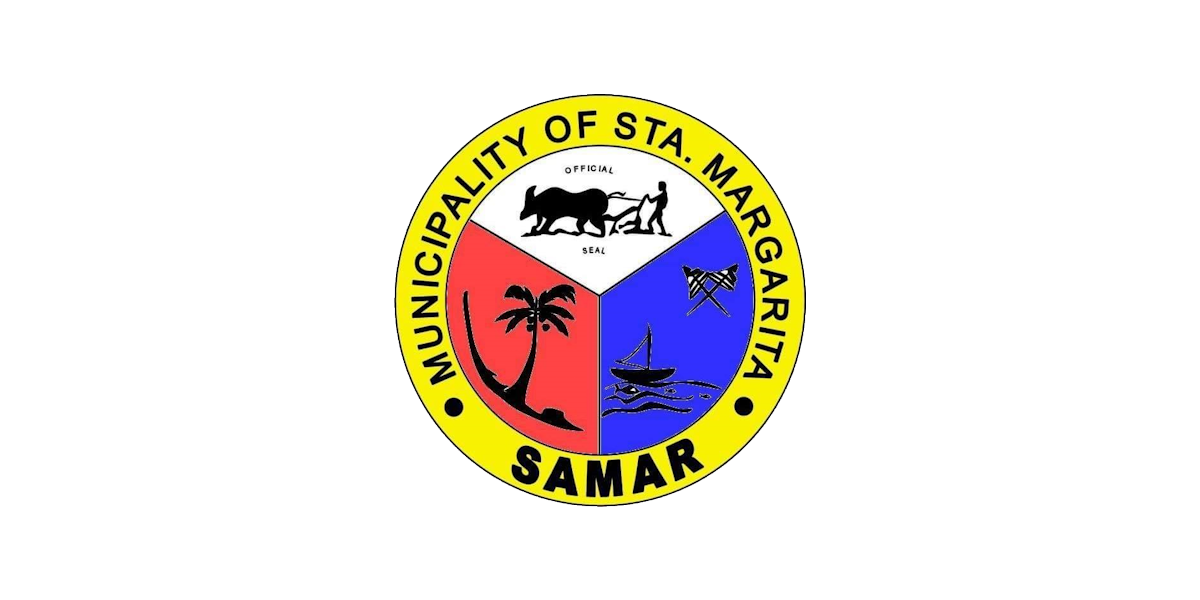
- Flag

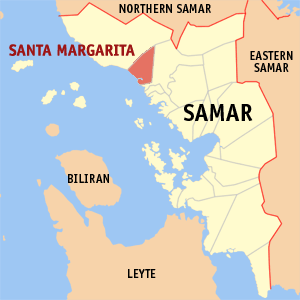
- Map of Samar with Santa Margarita highlighted
- Interactive map of Santa Margarita
- Location within the Philippines
- Coordinates: 12°02′16″N 124°39′28″E
- Country: Philippines
- Region: Eastern Visayas
- Province: Samar
- District: 1st district
- Barangays: 36 (see Barangays)

Government
  - Type: Sangguniang Bayan
  - Mayor: Felix Roma Panganoron
  - Vice Mayor: Soledad Perez Deloraya
  - Representative: Stephen James T. Tan
  - Councilors: List: • Alma A. Alegria; • Jesus C. Egot; • Winefreda D. Relos; • Edwin A. Pueblos; • Ma. Josefina A. Escuadra; • Maria M. Salomon; • Hermie C. Mendoza; • Ma. Liza J. Pedrosa; GMA Eleksyon 2025 Results
  - Electorate: 24,881 voters (2025)

Area
  - Total: 129.12 km^{2} (49.85 sq mi)
- Elevation: 29 m (95 ft)
- Highest elevation: 247 m (810 ft)
- Lowest elevation: 0 m (0 ft)

Population (2024 census)
  - Total: 27,012
  - Density: 209.20/km^{2} (541.83/sq mi)
  - Households: 6,348

Economy
  - Income class: 3rd municipal income class
  - Poverty incidence: 30.42% (2023)
  - Revenue: ₱ 183.4 million (2024)
  - Assets: ₱ 390.9 million (2024)
  - Expenditure: ₱ 182.4 million (2024)
  - Liabilities: ₱ 61.78 million (2024)

Service provider
  - Electricity: Samar 1 Electric Cooperative (SAMELCO 1)
- Time zone: UTC+8 (PST)
- ZIP code: 6718
- PSGC: 0806016000
- IDD : area code: +63 (0)55
- Native languages: Waray; Tagalog

Santa Margarita, officially the Municipality of Santa Margarita (Waray: Bungto han Santa Margarita; Tagalog: Bayan ng Santa Margarita), is a municipality in the province of Samar, Philippines. According to the 2024 census, it has a population of 27,012 people.

Formerly known as Magsohong, it is bounded to the north by the city of Calbayog and to the south by Gandara.

== History ==
The town used to be a barrio in Calbayog named Magsohong. On June 29, 1878, the principalía of Magsohong petitioned the Gobierno Superior to establish Magsohong as an independent pueblo. They argued that Magsohong was four hours away from Calbayog, while it already had a casa real or a Juzgado de Paz of nipa, a church with a techada (roof) of nipa; a convent; an escuela also made of wood and nipa; and had more than 300 tributos. The petition was endorsed by the cura parroco, the Gobernadorcillo as well as the principalía of Calbayog. Fourteen years later, Royal Decree No. 25 dated September 25, 1892 approved the establishment of the pueblo of Magsohong renamed Santa Margarita. The new pueblo had three visitas: Balud, San Bernardo, and Londara. However, it remained under the parish of Calbayog.

== Geography ==
=== Barangays ===
Santa Margarita is politically subdivided into 36 barangays. Each barangay consists of puroks and some have sitios.

- Agrupacion
- Arapison
- Avelino
- Bahay
- Balud
- Bana-ao
- Burabod
- Cagsumje
- Cautod (Poblacion)
- Camperito
- Campeig
- Can-ipulan
- Canmoros
- Cinco
- Curry
- Gajo
- Hindang
- Ilo
- Imelda
- Inoraguiao
- Jolacao
- Lambao
- Mabuhay
- Mahayag
- Matayonas
- Monbon (Poblacion)
- Nabulo
- Napuro I
- Napuro II
- Palale
- Panabatan
- Panaruan
- Roxas
- Salvacion
- Solsogon
- Sundara

=== Climate ===
Climate data for Santa Margarita, Samar
Month	Jan	Feb	Mar	Apr	May	Jun	Jul	Aug	Sep	Oct	Nov	Dec	Year
Mean daily maximum °C (°F)	28 (82)	29 (84)	29 (84)	31 (88)	31 (88)	30 (86)	29 (84)	29 (84)	29 (84)	29 (84)	29 (84)	28 (82)	29 (85)
Mean daily minimum °C (°F)	21 (70)	21 (70)	21 (70)	22 (72)	24 (75)	24 (75)	24 (75)	25 (77)	24 (75)	24 (75)	23 (73)	22 (72)	23 (73)
Average precipitation mm (inches)	72 (2.8)	52 (2.0)	65 (2.6)	62 (2.4)	87 (3.4)	129 (5.1)	153 (6.0)	124 (4.9)	147 (5.8)	157 (6.2)	139 (5.5)	117 (4.6)	1,304 (51.3)
Average rainy days	17.4	13.4	16.8	18.0	22.0	25.3	26.2	24.2	24.9	26.0	23.3	20.8	258.3
Source: Meteoblue

== Demographics ==
Population census of Santa Margarita
Year	Pop.	±% p.a.
1903	4,106	—
1918	8,028	+4.57%
1939	9,331	+0.72%
1948	10,940	+1.78%
1960	13,404	+1.71%
1970	15,814	+1.67%
1975	16,194	+0.48%
1980	16,922	+0.88%
1990	16,878	−0.03%
1995	19,146	+2.39%
2000	21,740	+2.76%
2007	23,488	+1.07%
2010	24,850	+2.07%
2015	26,348	+1.12%
2020	26,816	+0.37%
2024	27,012	+0.17%
Source: Philippine Statistics Authority

== Economy ==
Poverty incidence of Santa Margarita (%)

Source: Philippine Statistics Authority

== Tourism ==
- Arapison Falls
- Baluarte
- Burabod Picnic Grove
- Calvary Hill
- The Oldest Bell
- The Oldest Natural Spring Water
- Hell’s Fog Nature Oark
- Mamitagaytay
- St. James Parish Sta Margarita

== Culture ==
=== Alimango Festival ===
July 25 (Alimango Festival) - this dance festival revolves around the courtship between the female alimango (the mud crab Scylla serrata found in fishponds) Atabayi and the male Amamakhao. It also depicts the capture of the alimango with the use of the bobo and giant bentol (kinds of traps). Dancers, dressed as alimango, flex their hands as if to bite. Snare drums and talutang highlight the fast rhythm of the dance.
