= Stephany Uy-Tan =

Filipina politician

The Honourable Stephany Uy-Tan
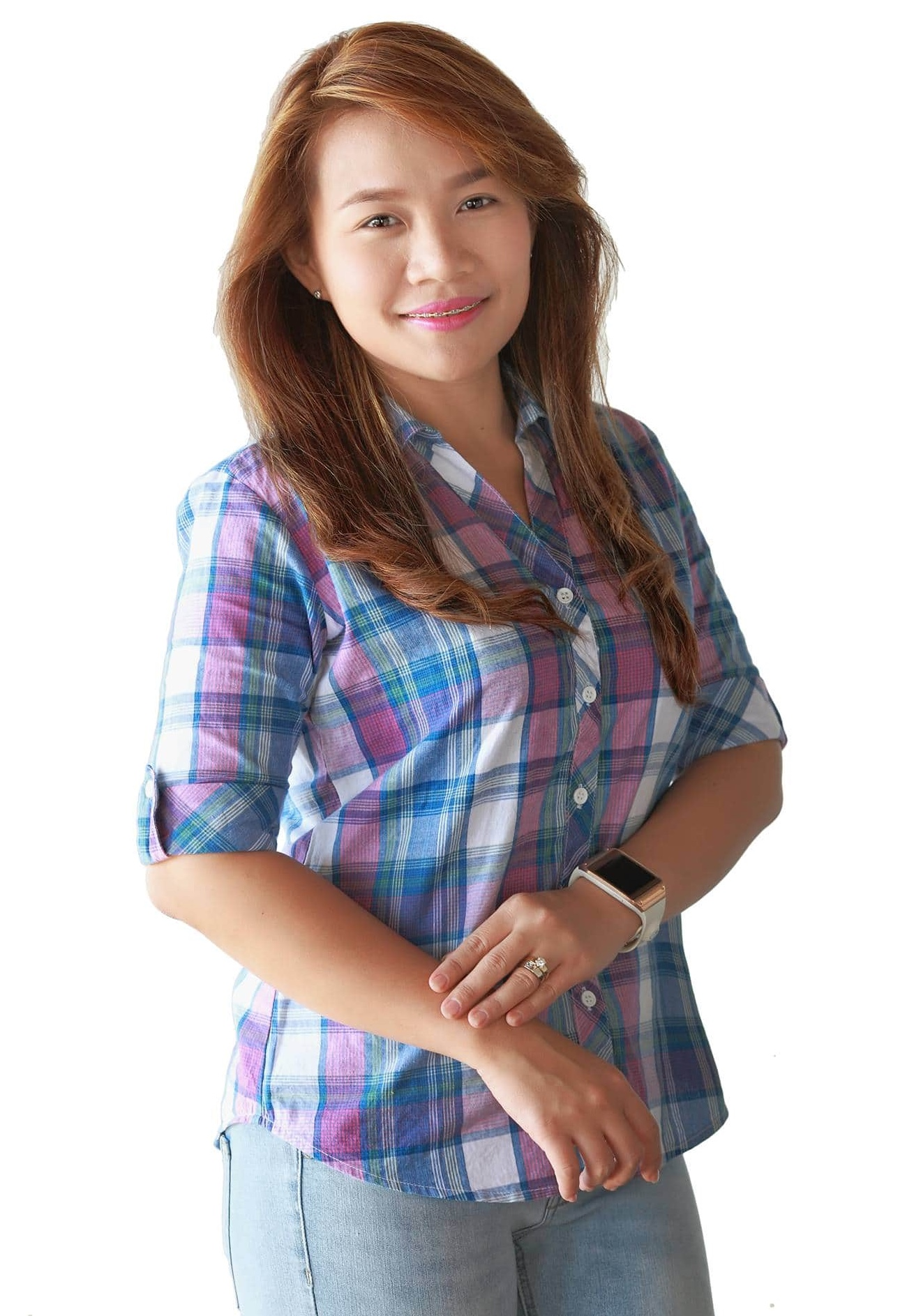
- Stephany Uy-Tan in 2014

Mayor of Catbalogan
- In office June 30, 2013 – June 30, 2019
- Preceded by: Coefredo Uy
- Succeeded by: Dexter Uy

Councilor of Catbalogan
- Incumbent
- Assumed office June 30, 2019

Personal details
- Born: Stephany Madriaga Uy; August 28, 1983 (age 43) Catbalogan, Samar, Philippines
- Party: Nacionalista (2021-present)
- Other political affiliations: PDP–Laban (2018-2021); NPC (2015-2018); Liberal (2012-2015)
- Domestic partner: Stephen James Tan (separated)
- Education: Catbalogan I Central Elementary School; Samar National High School; Saint Mary's College of Catbalogan
- Occupation: Politician
- Nickname: Step

Stephany Madriaga Uy (born August 28, 1983) is a Filipina politician who served as mayor of Catbalogan, Samar for two consecutive terms.

== Early life ==
Tan was born in Catbalogan, Samar to then-Catbalogan Mayor now Vice Mayor Coefredo “Tekwa” Uy.

She attended her elementary days in Catbalogan I Central Elementary School and spent her high school life at Samar National High School. She pursued her degree in college at Saint Mary’s College of Catbalogan.

== Political career ==
Tan started her political career when she ran for the position of councilor of Catbalogan. After the term of her father as city mayor, she ran in mayoralty position and won tagging her as the first lady mayor in the history of the city bearing “STEP FORWARD Catbalogan City!” as brand of her leadership. After her term, she was re-elected as councilor.

== Controversies ==
=== 6-Month preventive suspension ===
In 2018, the Department of the Interior and Local Government (DILG) upon the directive of Ombudsman of the Philippines served a 6-month preventive suspension order to former Mayor Stephany Uy-Tan, Vice Mayor Art Sherwin Gabon, 7 city councilors, and 3 city hall employees in connection with the Catbalogan government's alleged overpriced purchase of a 5.8-hectare property. The plunder allegation was filed by Bernard Jake Ramos, an employee of the Catbalogan mayor's office. The DILG designated Councilor Archie Fuentes as acting mayor, and Councilor Kendall Perez, as acting vice mayor during the hearing of the case.

=== Graft allegation from typhoon victims ===
On 2017, Tan was accused of allegedly changing the Typhoon Ruby (Hagupit) victims' categories from "totally damaged houses" to "partially damaged houses", therefore cutting in half the monetary assistance. Victims with totally damaged homes were supposed to receive P16,000 each, however, complainants alleged that their local government changed the category and instead distributed only P8,000 each.

=== Uy-Tan political dynasty ===
Tan is the daughter of Ex-Mayor, later City Vice Mayor, Coefredo “Tekwa” Uy and sister of incumbent Catbalogan mayor Dexter Uy.

She is the former wife of Stephen James “Jimboy” Tan, the brother of Samar Ex-Governor now 2nd Legislative District of Samar Congresswoman Sharee Ann Tan and Samar Governor Reynolds Michael Tan and son of the late 2nd Legislative District of Samar Congresswoman Milagrosa Tan who sought a seat in the provincial board in year 1998 to replace her brother-in-law Ruben Tan, who was in turn a substitute for her late husband, Ricardo Tan.

== Personal life ==
Tan previously married to Samar 1st District Representative Stephen James "Jimboy" Tan. They have two daughters.
