= Tagapul-an =

Municipality in Samar, Philippines

- Municipality
- Municipality of Tagapul-an
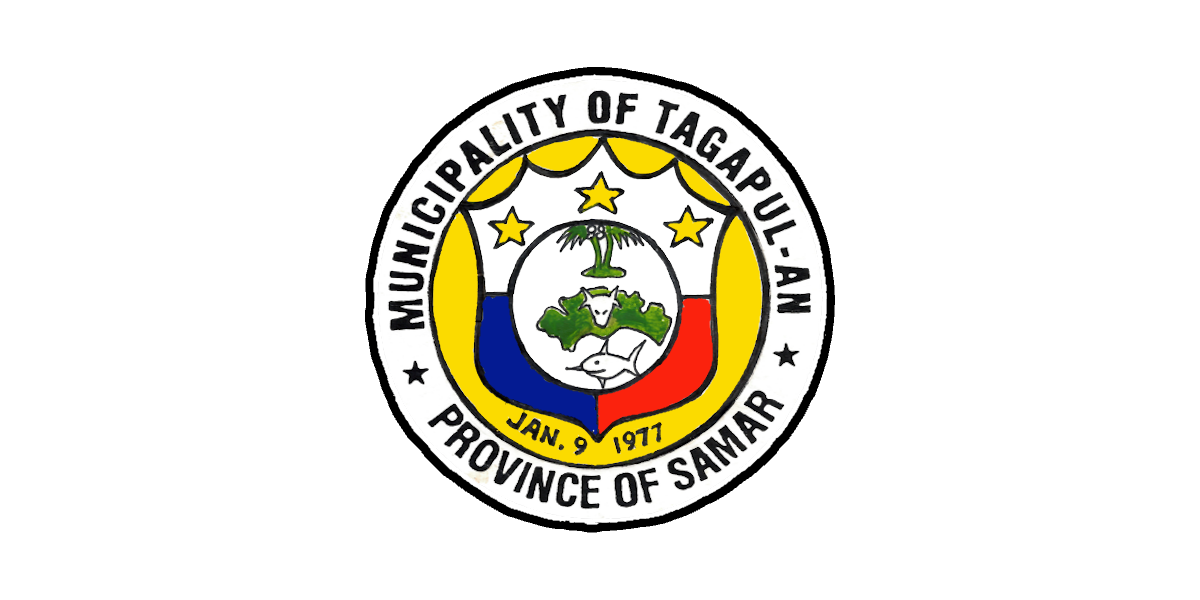
- Flag

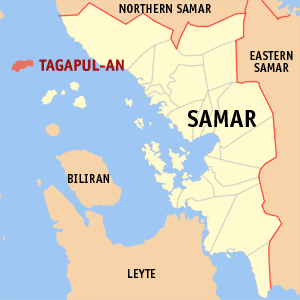
- Map of Samar with Tagapul-an highlighted
- Interactive map of Tagapul-an
- Location within the Philippines
- Coordinates: 12°03′N 124°09′E
- Country: Philippines
- Region: Eastern Visayas
- Province: Samar
- District: 1st district
- Founded: November 15, 1976
- Barangays: 14 (see Barangays)

Government
  - Type: Sangguniang Bayan
  - Mayor: Princess Kate Limpiado
  - Vice Mayor: Vicente M. Limpiado Jr.
  - Representative: Stephen James Tan
  - Electorate: 7,531 voters (2025)

Area
  - Total: 28.70 km^{2} (11.08 sq mi)
- Elevation: 6.0 m (19.7 ft)
- Highest elevation: 522 m (1,713 ft)
- Lowest elevation: 0 m (0 ft)

Population (2024 census)
  - Total: 9,139
  - Density: 318.4/km^{2} (824.7/sq mi)
  - Households: 1,973

Economy
  - Income class: 5th municipal income class
  - Poverty incidence: 35.76% (2023)
  - Revenue: ₱ 103.4 million (2024)
  - Assets: ₱ 228.8 million (2024)
  - Expenditure: ₱ 93.66 million (2024)
  - Liabilities: ₱ 59.01 million (2024)

Service provider
  - Electricity: Samar 1 Electric Cooperative (SAMELCO 1)
- Time zone: UTC+8 (PST)
- ZIP code: 6719
- PSGC: 0806024000
- IDD : area code: +63 (0)55
- Native languages: Cebuano; Waray; Tagalog

Tagapul-an, officially the Municipality of Tagapul-an (Cebuano: Lungsod sa Tagapul-an; Waray: Bungto han Tagapul-an; Tagalog: Bayan ng Tagupul-an), is a municipality in the province of Samar, Philippines. According to the 2024 census, it has a population of 9,139 people.

It is the furthest municipality from the province's mainland.

== History ==
The island of Tagapul-an was originally part of the municipality of Almagro. Tagapul-an was established as a municipality of Western Samar on November 15, 1976. It originally consisted of 11 barangays: Baguin, Balocawe, Guimbarocan, Langbaybay, Luna, Mataloto, Nipa, Pantalan, Polangbato, San Vicente, and Sugod, which was designated as the municipal seat of government.

== Geography ==
=== Barangays ===
Tagapul-an is politically subdivided into 14 barangays. Each barangay consists of puroks and some have sitios.

- Baquiw
- Balocawe
- Guinbarucan
- Labangbaybay
- Luna
- Mataluto
- Nipa
- Pantalan
- Pulangbato
- San Vicente
- Sugod (Poblacion)
- Suarez (Manlangit)
- San Jose (Poblacion)
- Trinidad

=== Climate ===
Climate data for Tagapul-an, Samar
Month	Jan	Feb	Mar	Apr	May	Jun	Jul	Aug	Sep	Oct	Nov	Dec	Year
Mean daily maximum °C (°F)	28 (82)	29 (84)	30 (86)	32 (90)	32 (90)	31 (88)	30 (86)	30 (86)	30 (86)	29 (84)	29 (84)	28 (82)	30 (86)
Mean daily minimum °C (°F)	22 (72)	22 (72)	22 (72)	23 (73)	24 (75)	24 (75)	24 (75)	24 (75)	24 (75)	24 (75)	23 (73)	23 (73)	23 (74)
Average precipitation mm (inches)	39 (1.5)	34 (1.3)	42 (1.7)	36 (1.4)	73 (2.9)	109 (4.3)	118 (4.6)	108 (4.3)	129 (5.1)	136 (5.4)	112 (4.4)	89 (3.5)	1,025 (40.4)
Average rainy days	12.6	9.7	12.0	13.0	20.5	25.3	26.2	24.8	25.2	25.9	21.9	17.9	235
Source: Meteoblue

== Demographics ==
Population census of Tagapul-an
Year	Pop.	±% p.a.
1980	7,605	—
1990	6,760	−1.17%
1995	7,949	+3.08%
2000	8,370	+1.11%
2007	8,067	−0.51%
2010	7,828	−1.09%
2015	8,473	+1.52%
2020	8,805	+0.81%
2024	9,139	+0.90%
Source: Philippine Statistics Authority

== Economy ==
Poverty incidence of Tagapul-an (%)

Source: Philippine Statistics Authority

== Transportation ==
The only means of access to Tagapul-an is by motorboat from the port of Calbayog, taking about 2 hours to travel there.
