= Mondragon, Northern Samar =

Municipality in the Philippines

Mondragon
- Municipality
- Municipality of Mondragon
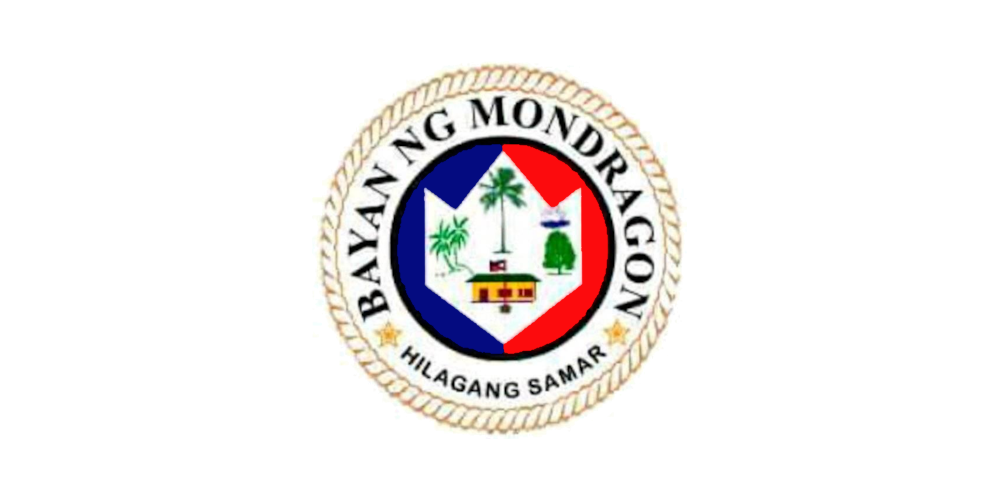
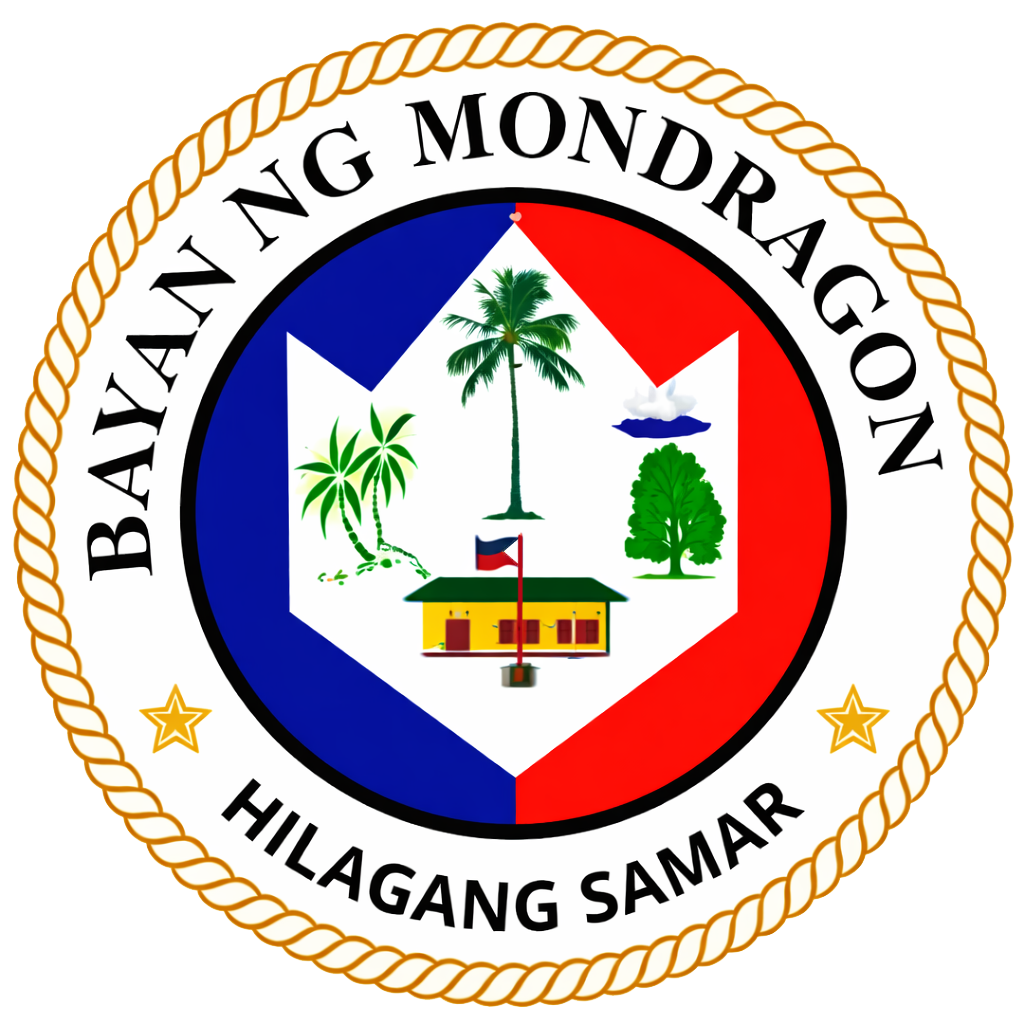
- Flag Seal

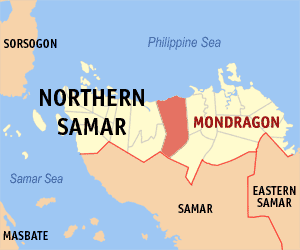
- Map of Northern Samar with Mondragon highlighted
- Interactive map of Mondragon
- Location within the Philippines
- Coordinates: 12°31′N 124°45′E
- Country: Philippines
- Region: Eastern Visayas
- Province: Northern Samar
- District: 1st district
- Barangays: 24 (see Barangays)

Government
  - Type: Sangguniang Bayan
  - Mayor: Mario M. Madera
  - Vice Mayor: Dawn A. Unay
  - Representative: Paul R. Daza
  - Councilors: List: • Ma. Lucia D. Villadolid; • Raymundo E. Conge; • Rudy A. Galing; • Melecio E. Chin; • Gil R. Unay; • Rufo M. Huavas; • Myla D. Marquita; • Arly Arthur A. Mananguite; DILG Masterlist of Officials
  - Electorate: 29,437 voters (2025)

Area
  - Total: 288.90 km^{2} (111.54 sq mi)
- Elevation: 18 m (59 ft)
- Highest elevation: 150 m (490 ft)
- Lowest elevation: 0 m (0 ft)

Population (2024 census)
  - Total: 43,116
  - Density: 149.24/km^{2} (386.53/sq mi)
  - Households: 8,582

Economy
  - Income class: 1st municipal income class
  - Poverty incidence: 31.61% (2023)
  - Revenue: ₱ 268.4 million (2024)
  - Assets: ₱ 719.9 million (2024)
  - Expenditure: ₱ 240.5 million (2024)
  - Liabilities: ₱ 82.87 million (2024)

Service provider
  - Electricity: Northern Samar Electric Cooperative (NORSAMELCO)
- Time zone: UTC+8 (PST)
- ZIP code: 6417
- PSGC: 0804813000
- IDD : area code: +63 (0)55
- Native languages: Waray; Tagalog

Mondragon, officially the Municipality of Mondragon (Waray: Bungto han Mondragon; Tagalog: Bayan ng Mondragon), is a municipality in the province of Northern Samar, Philippines. According to the 2024 census, it has a population of 43,116 people.

== Geography ==
=== Barangays ===
Mondragon is politically subdivided into 24 barangays. Each barangay consists of puroks and some have sitios.

- Bagasbas
- Bugko
- Cablangan
- Cagmanaba
- Cahicsan
- Chitongco (Poblacion)
- De Maria
- Doña Lucia
- Eco (Poblacion)
- Flormina
- Hinabangan
- Imelda
- La Trinidad
- Makiwalo
- Mirador
- Nenita
- Roxas
- San Agustin
- San Antonio
- San Isidro
- San Jose
- San Juan
- Santa Catalina
- Talolora

=== Climate ===
Climate data for Mondragon, Northern Samar
| Month | Jan | Feb | Mar | Apr | May | Jun | Jul | Aug | Sep | Oct | Nov | Dec | Year |
|---|---|---|---|---|---|---|---|---|---|---|---|---|---|
| Mean daily maximum °C (°F) | 27 (81) | 28 (82) | 29 (84) | 30 (86) | 31 (88) | 30 (86) | 29 (84) | 29 (84) | 29 (84) | 29 (84) | 29 (84) | 28 (82) | 29 (84) |
| Mean daily minimum °C (°F) | 22 (72) | 22 (72) | 22 (72) | 22 (72) | 24 (75) | 24 (75) | 24 (75) | 24 (75) | 24 (75) | 24 (75) | 23 (73) | 23 (73) | 23 (74) |
| Average precipitation mm (inches) | 84 (3.3) | 59 (2.3) | 58 (2.3) | 55 (2.2) | 93 (3.7) | 133 (5.2) | 149 (5.9) | 125 (4.9) | 155 (6.1) | 165 (6.5) | 140 (5.5) | 136 (5.4) | 1,352 (53.3) |
| Average rainy days | 18.1 | 13.6 | 15.8 | 16.1 | 21.7 | 25.5 | 26.6 | 25.1 | 24.8 | 25.8 | 22.7 | 20.1 | 255.9 |
Source: Meteoblue

== Demographics ==
Population census of Mondragon
| Year | Pop. | ±% p.a. |
|---|---|---|
| 1903 | 2,713 | — |
| 1918 | 3,940 | +2.52% |
| 1939 | 7,369 | +3.03% |
| 1948 | 9,741 | +3.15% |
| 1960 | 12,302 | +1.96% |
| 1970 | 14,974 | +1.98% |
| 1975 | 15,834 | +1.13% |
| 1980 | 20,423 | +5.22% |
| 1990 | 21,399 | +0.47% |
| 1995 | 25,504 | +3.34% |
| 2000 | 28,098 | +2.10% |
| 2007 | 32,718 | +2.12% |
| 2010 | 35,318 | +2.82% |
| 2015 | 38,726 | +1.77% |
| 2020 | 41,415 | +1.42% |
| 2024 | 43,116 | +0.97% |
Source: Philippine Statistics Authority

== Economy ==
Poverty incidence of Mondragon (%)

Source: Philippine Statistics Authority
