= Almagro, Samar =

Municipality in Samar, Philippines

Almagro
- Municipality
- Municipality of Almagro
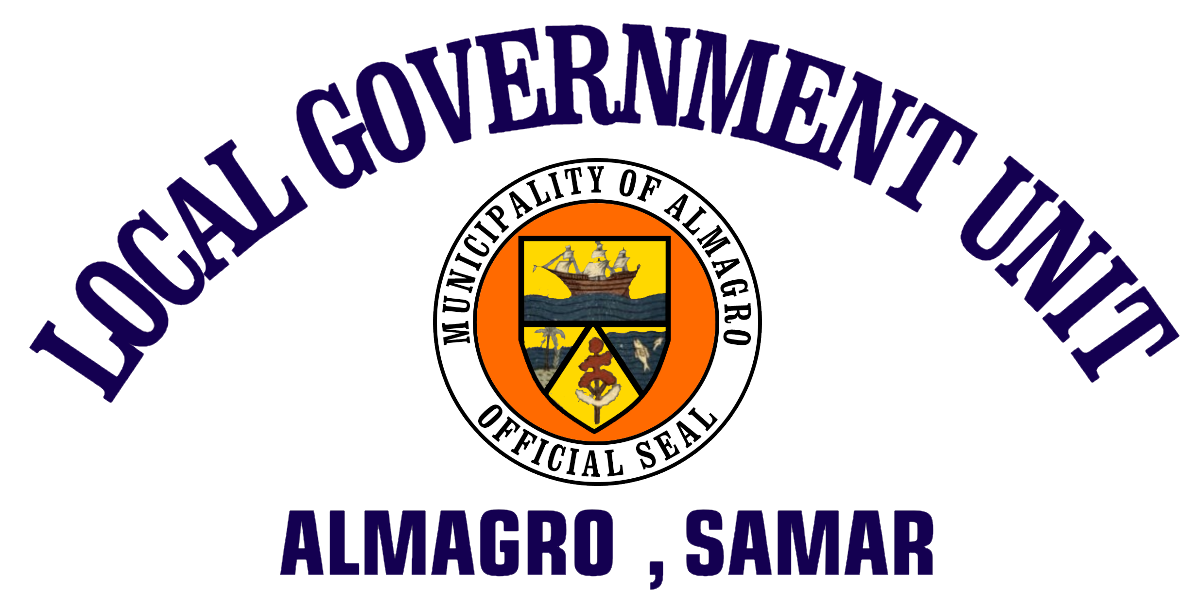
- Flag

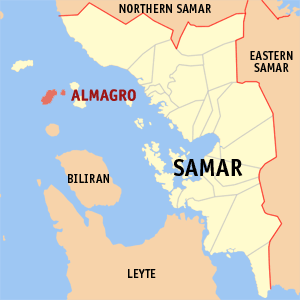
- Map of Samar with Almagro highlighted
- Interactive map of Almagro
- Location within the Philippines
- Coordinates: 11°54′39″N 124°17′07″E
- Country: Philippines
- Region: Eastern Visayas
- Province: Samar
- District: 1st district
- Barangays: 23 (see Barangays)

Government
  - Type: Sangguniang Bayan
  - Mayor: Amelia P. Cano
  - Vice Mayor: Kathleen S. Prudenciado
  - Representative: Stephen James Tan
  - Councilors: List: • Ranel L. Geras; • Jenesa J. Tomamak; • Hazel M. Merino; • Fernando I. Jabinal; • Anilor B. Orbeso; • Danilo B. Cornita; • Claudio F. Lapure; • Henry C. Canonoy; DILG Masterlist of Officials
  - Electorate: 11,575 voters (2025)

Area
  - Total: 51.36 km^{2} (19.83 sq mi)
- Elevation: 11 m (36 ft)
- Highest elevation: 899 m (2,949 ft)
- Lowest elevation: 0 m (0 ft)

Population (2024 census)
  - Total: 8,571
  - Density: 166.9/km^{2} (432.2/sq mi)
  - Households: 2,243

Economy
  - Income class: 5th municipal income class
  - Poverty incidence: 30.21% (2023)
  - Revenue: ₱ 101.3 million (2024)
  - Assets: ₱ 284.7 million (2024)
  - Expenditure: ₱ 148.3 million (2024)
  - Liabilities: ₱ 69.1 million (2024)

Service provider
  - Electricity: Samar 1 Electric Cooperative (SAMELCO 1)
- Time zone: UTC+8 (PST)
- ZIP code: 6724
- PSGC: 0806001000
- IDD : area code: +63 (0)55
- Native languages: Cebuano; Waray; Tagalog

Almagro, officially the Municipality of Almagro (Cebuano: Lungsod sa Almagro; Waray: Bungto han Almagro; Filipino: Bayan ng Almagro), is a municipality in the province of Samar, Philippines. According to the 2024 census, it has a population of 8,571 people.

== Geography ==
=== Barangays ===
Almagro is politically subdivided into 23 barangays. Each barangay consists of puroks and some have sitios.

- Bacjao
- Biasong I
- Costa Rica
- Guin-ansan
- Kerikite
- Lunang I (Look)
- Lunang II
- Malobago
- Marasbaras
- Panjobjoban I
- Poblacion
- Talahid
- Tonga-Tonga
- Imelda (Badjang)
- Biasong II
- Costa Rica II
- Mabuhay
- Magsaysay
- Panjobjoban II
- Roño
- San Isidro
- San Jose
- Veloso

=== Climate ===
Climate data for Almagro, Samar
| Month | Jan | Feb | Mar | Apr | May | Jun | Jul | Aug | Sep | Oct | Nov | Dec | Year |
|---|---|---|---|---|---|---|---|---|---|---|---|---|---|
| Mean daily maximum °C (°F) | 28 (82) | 29 (84) | 29 (84) | 31 (88) | 31 (88) | 30 (86) | 29 (84) | 29 (84) | 29 (84) | 29 (84) | 29 (84) | 28 (82) | 29 (85) |
| Mean daily minimum °C (°F) | 21 (70) | 21 (70) | 21 (70) | 22 (72) | 24 (75) | 24 (75) | 24 (75) | 25 (77) | 24 (75) | 24 (75) | 23 (73) | 22 (72) | 23 (73) |
| Average precipitation mm (inches) | 72 (2.8) | 52 (2.0) | 65 (2.6) | 62 (2.4) | 87 (3.4) | 129 (5.1) | 153 (6.0) | 124 (4.9) | 147 (5.8) | 157 (6.2) | 139 (5.5) | 117 (4.6) | 1,304 (51.3) |
| Average rainy days | 17.4 | 13.4 | 16.8 | 18.0 | 22.0 | 25.3 | 26.2 | 24.2 | 24.9 | 26.0 | 23.3 | 20.8 | 258.3 |
Source: Meteoblue

== Demographics ==
Population census of Almagro
| Year | Pop. | ±% p.a. |
|---|---|---|
| 1903 | 5,673 | — |
| 1918 | 5,216 | −0.56% |
| 1939 | 7,126 | +1.50% |
| 1948 | 9,391 | +3.11% |
| 1960 | 11,276 | +1.54% |
| 1970 | 13,977 | +2.17% |
| 1975 | 16,010 | +2.76% |
| 1980 | 10,097 | −8.80% |
| 1990 | 8,578 | −1.62% |
| 1995 | 10,270 | +3.43% |
| 2000 | 10,619 | +0.72% |
| 2007 | 8,650 | −2.79% |
| 2010 | 11,024 | +9.23% |
| 2015 | 8,942 | −3.91% |
| 2020 | 9,273 | +0.77% |
| 2024 | 8,571 | −1.87% |
Source: Philippine Statistics Authority

== Economy ==
Poverty incidence of Almagro (%)

Source: Philippine Statistics Authority

== Tourism ==
- Pang-pang (Veloso and Panjobjoban 1)
- Exotic Diving Resort (Barangay Kerikite)
- Caves in Almagro
- Rock formation
- Museum of Endangered Species
- LightHouse (lighthouse island)

== Culture ==
The most famous dance in Almagro is Kuratsa, because of the influence of the Spaniards that controlled the municipality for 330 years. They held their occasions on the newly constructed Covered Court in Barangay Poblacion. Their Fiestas and Charter Days are the days where many people would come to Almagro to witness different activities held on the island. People in Almagro are often seen wearing sando because of the hot weather and the sea breeze on the island.

== Transportation ==
The only one means of access to Almagro is by motorboat from the port of Calbayog, taking usually up to 2 hours of travel.
