= Stephen James Tan =

Filipino politician and businessman (born 1983)

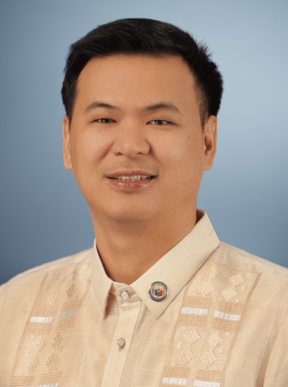
- Official portrait, 2025

Member of the House of Representatives from Samar’s 1st District
- Incumbent
- Assumed office June 30, 2022
- Preceded by: Edgar Mary Sarmiento

House Deputy Minority Leader
- Incumbent
- Assumed office July 30, 2022
- Leader: Marcelino Libanan

Vice Governor of Samar
- In office June 30, 2010 – June 30, 2019
- Governor: Sharee Ann Tan
- Preceded by: Jesus Redaja
- Succeeded by: Reynolds Michael Tan

Personal details
- Born: Stephen James Tee Tan; September 13, 1983 (age 43) Cebu City, Philippines
- Party: Nacionalista (2012–present)
- Other political affiliations: Lakas (2009–2012)
- Parent(s): Ricardo Tan (father); Milagrosa Tan (mother)
- Relatives: Reynolds Michael Tan (brother); Sharee Ann Tan (sister)
- Education: Cebu Institute of Technology
- Occupation: Politician, businessman

Stephen James "Jimboy" Tee Tan (born September 13, 1983) is a Filipino politician and businessman. He is currently serving as representative of the 1st District of Samar in the House of Representatives of the Philippines since 2022. He also served as vice governor of Samar from 2010 to 2019.

== Early life and education ==
Tan was born on September 13, 1983, in Cebu City, to Ricardo Tan and Milagrosa Tee. He attended Colegio de San Francisco Javier Inc. – Palompon for his secondary education. He studied Cebu Institute of Technology for his college education.

== Political career ==
In 2010, Tan was elected as vice governor of Samar where he served for three consecutive terms.

In 2019, Tan ran as representative for first district of Samar but he lost to Edgar Mary Sarmiento.

In 2022, Tan was elected as representative for first district of Samar after he beat Edgar Mary Sarmiento over 93,875 votes.

== Personal life ==
Tan is previously married to Stephany Uy-Tan and has two daughters.

House of Representatives of the Philippines
| Preceded by Edgar Mary Sarmiento | Member of the House of Representatives from Samar's 1st district 2022–present | Incumbent |
Political offices
| Preceded by Jesus Redaja | Vice Governor of Samar; 2010–2019 | Succeeded by Reynolds Michael Tan |
