= Samar (province) =

Samar Western Samar
- Province
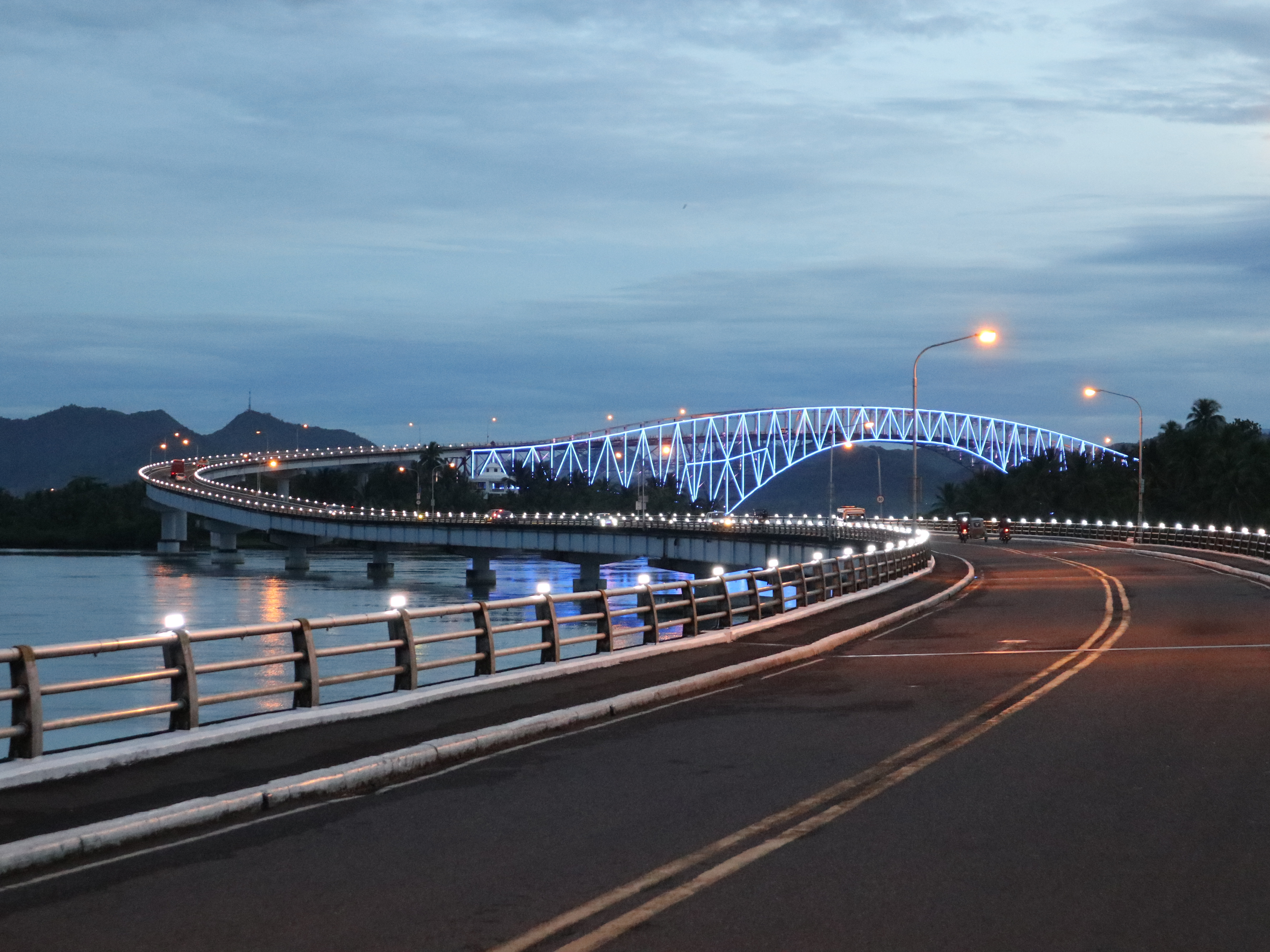
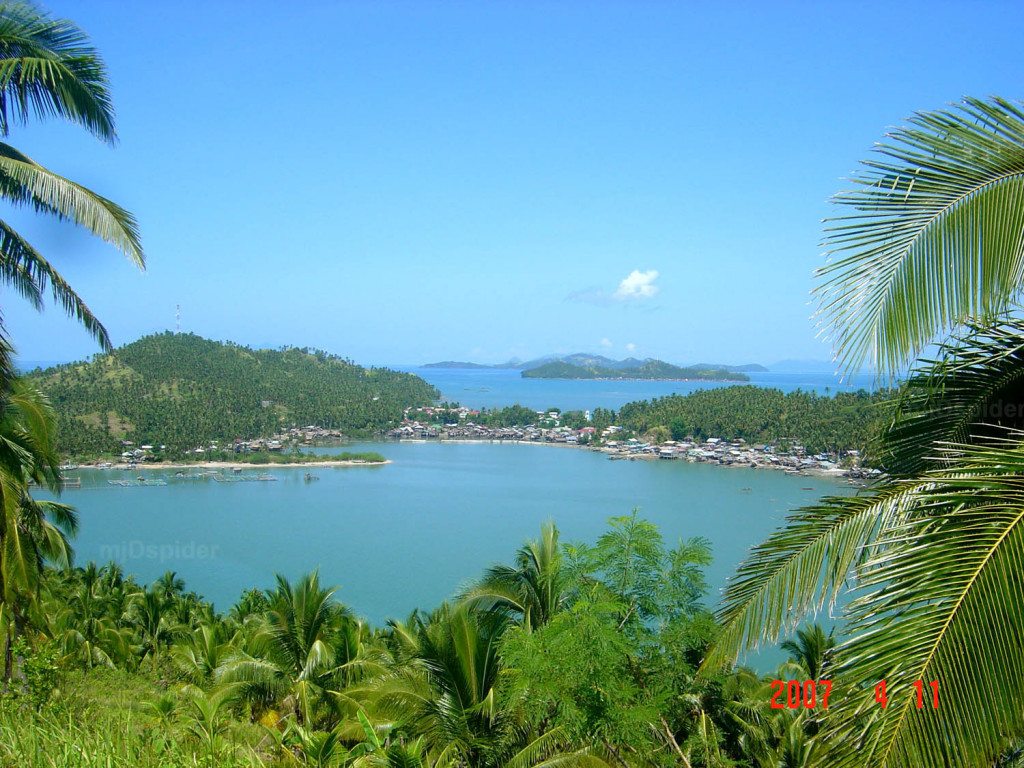
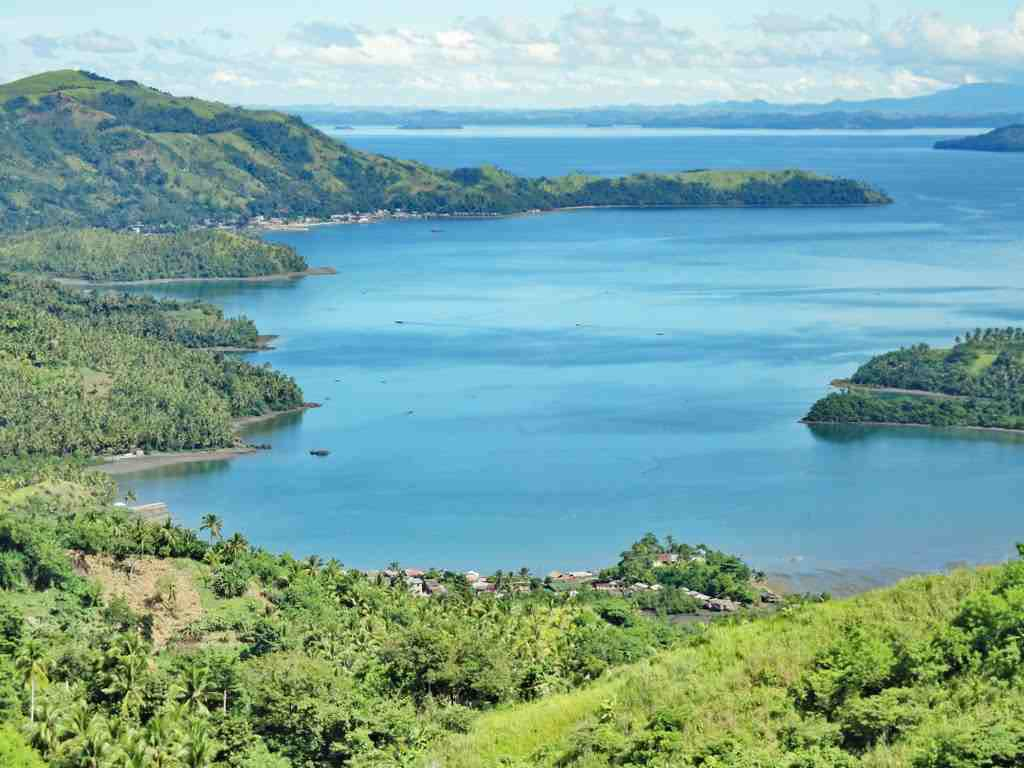
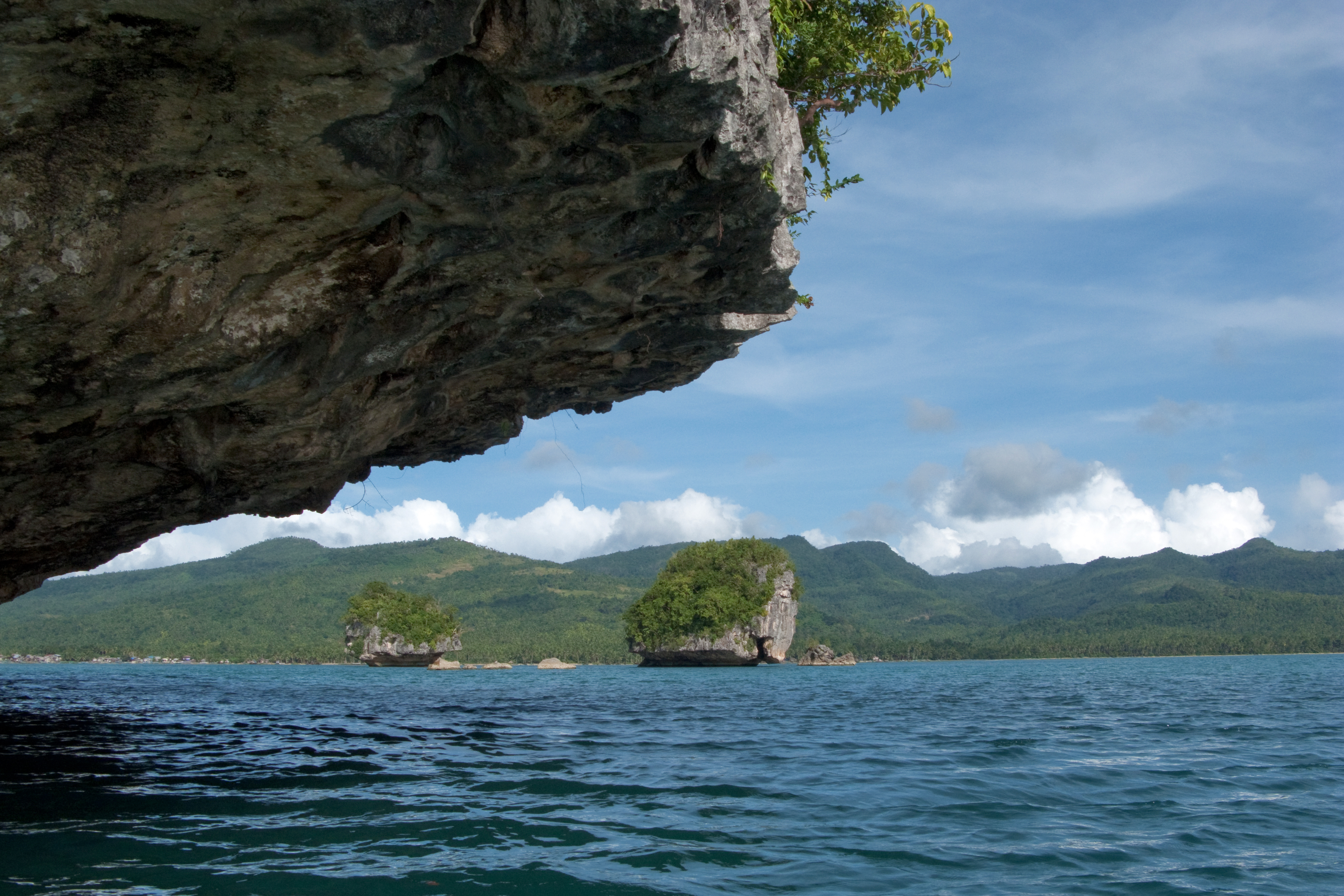
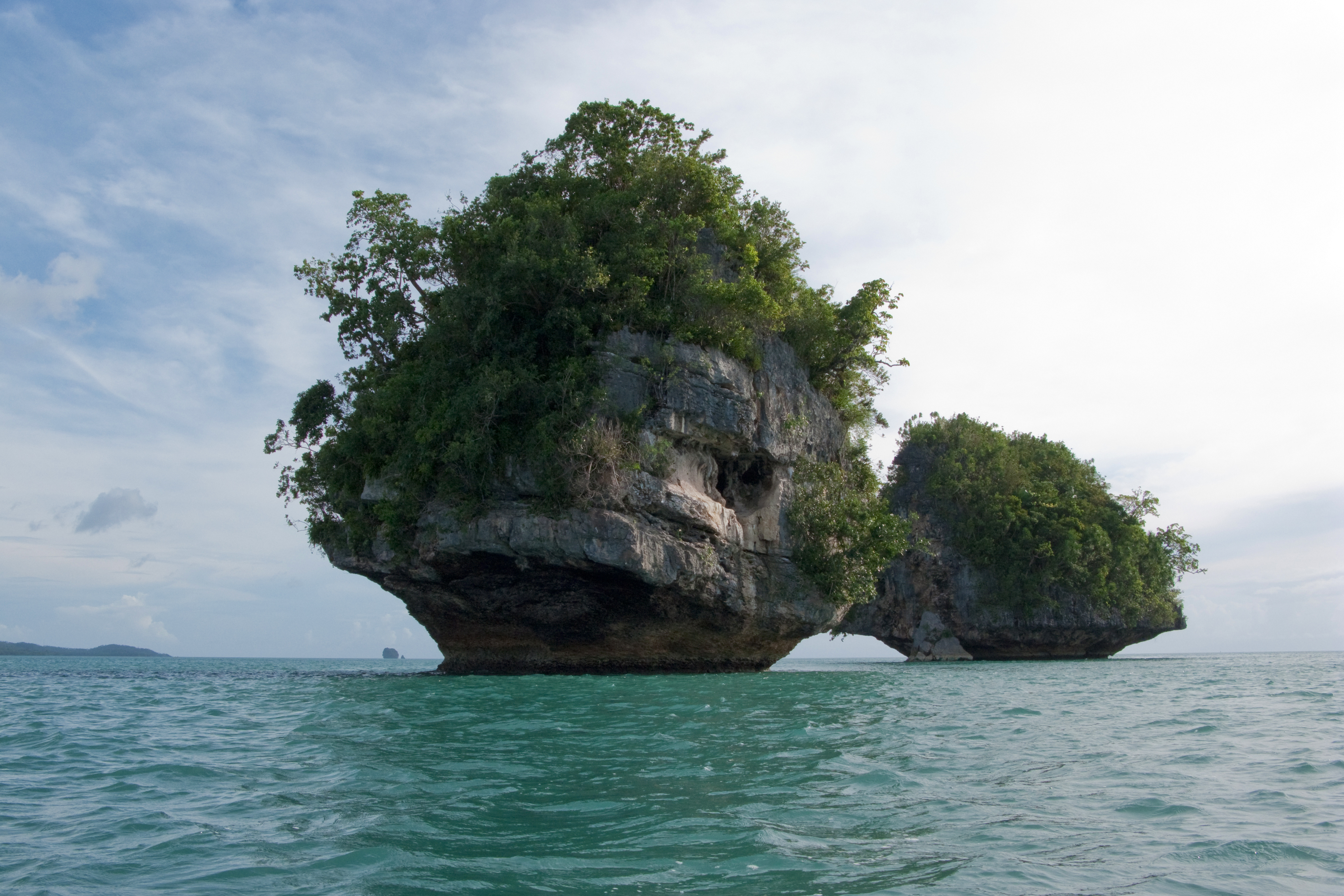
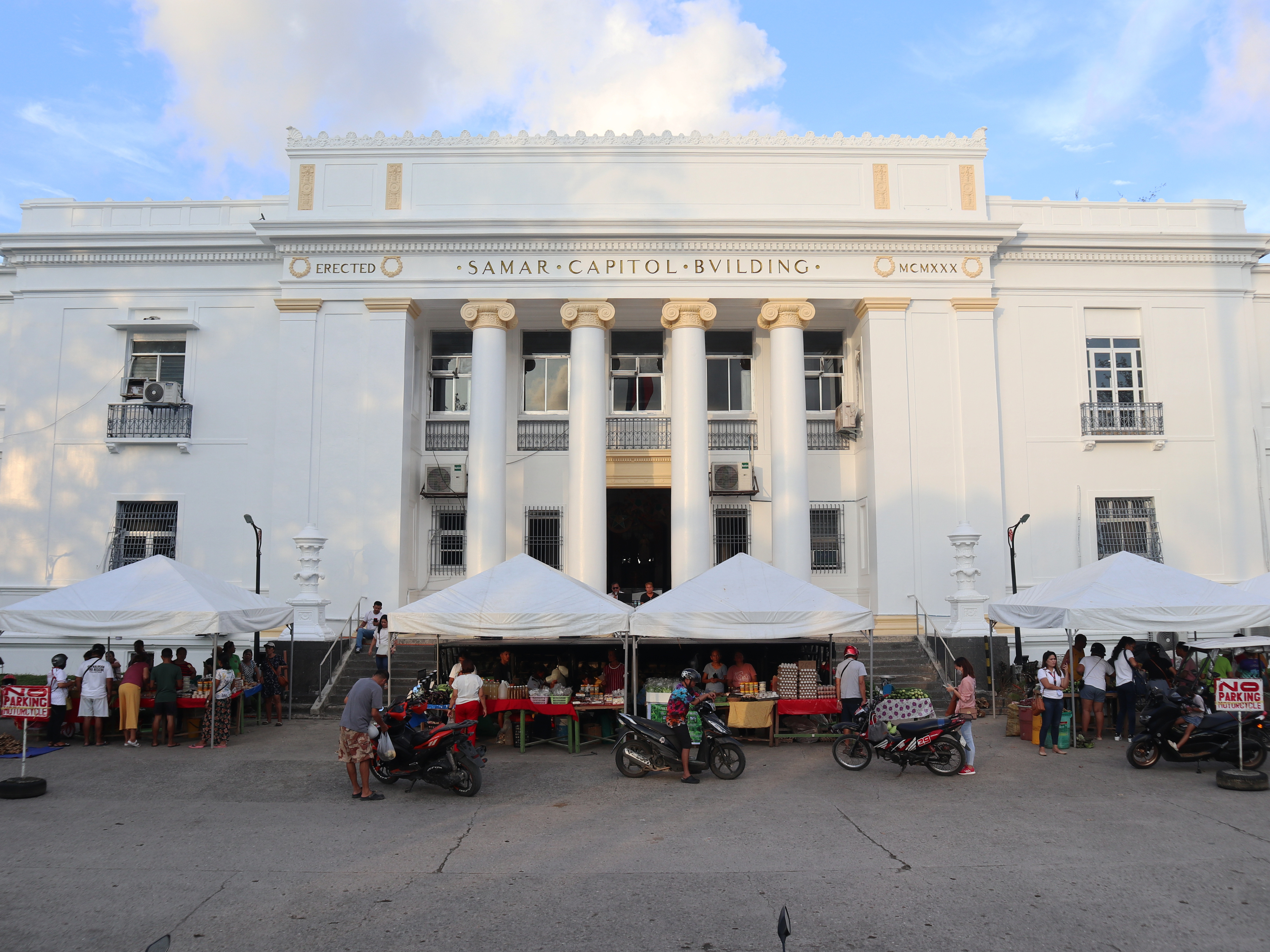
- (from top: left to right) San Juanico Bridge, Tarangnan town, Talalora Bay, San Pedro Bay, Rocks of Marabut and Samar Provincial Capitol

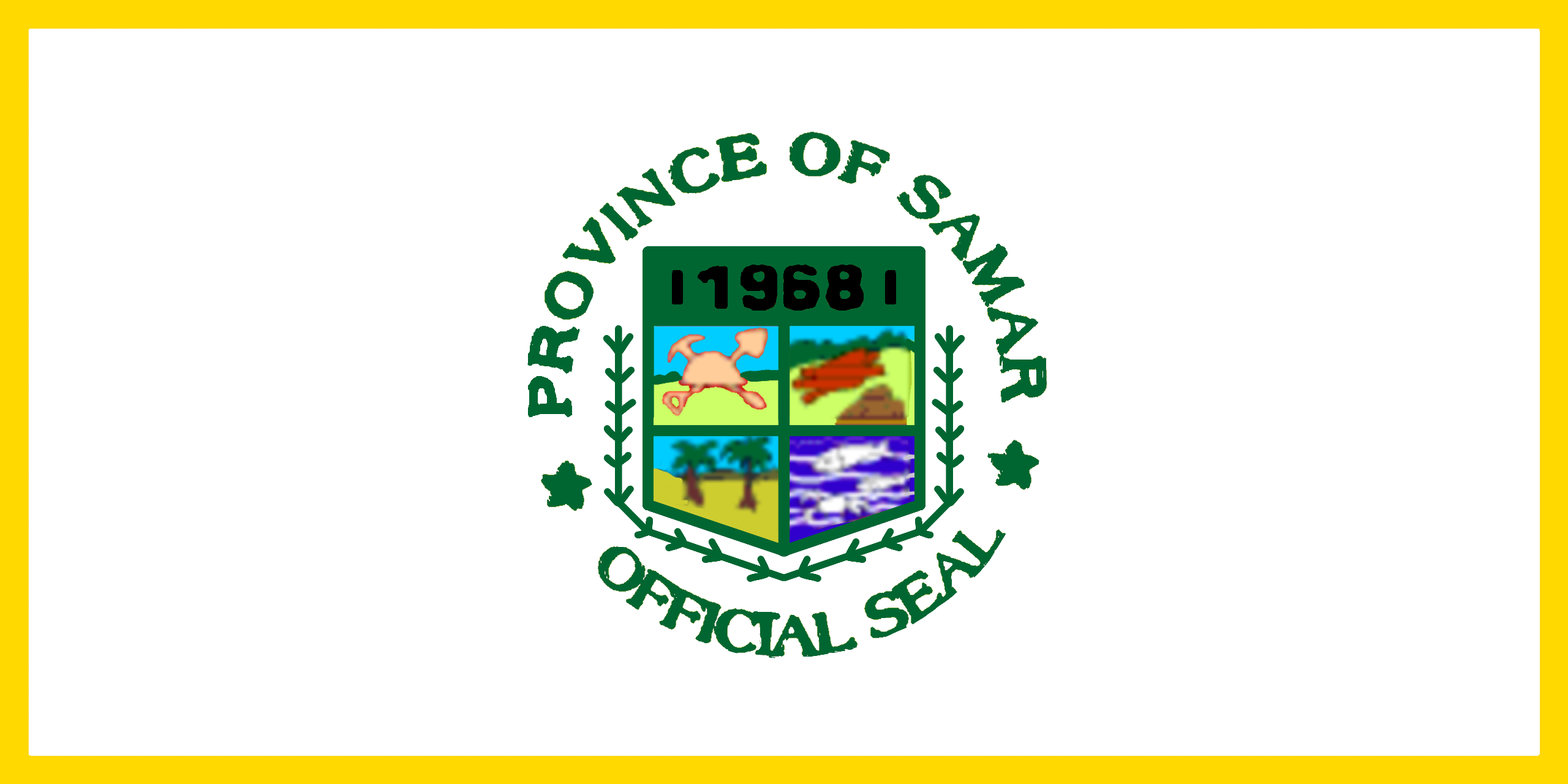
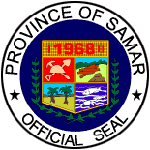
- Flag Seal
- Nickname: The Caving Capital Province of the Philippines
- Location in the Philippines
- Interactive map of Samar
- Coordinates: 11°50′N 125°00′E
- Country: Philippines
- Region: Eastern Visayas
- Founded (via Samar division): June 11, 1965
- Ratified: November 14, 1967
- Renamed: June 21, 1969
- Capital: Catbalogan
- Largest city: Calbayog

Government
  - Type: Sangguniang Panlalawigan
  - Governor: Sharee Ann T. Tan (NP)
  - Vice Governor: Arnold V. Tan (PFP)
  - Legislature: Samar Provincial Board
  - Electorate: 625,543 voters (2025)

Area
  - Total: 6,048.03 km^{2} (2,335.16 sq mi)
  - Rank: 10th out of 82
- Highest elevation (Mount Huraw): 890 m (2,920 ft)

Population (2024 census)
  - Total: 806,179
  - Rank: 39th out of 82
  - Density: 133.296/km^{2} (345.235/sq mi)
  - Rank: 64th out of 82
  - Households: 181,794

Divisions
  - Independent cities: 0
  - Component cities: 2: Catbalogan; Calbayog
  - Municipalities: 24: Almagro; Basey; Calbiga; Daram; Gandara; Hinabangan; Jiabong; Marabut; Matuguinao; Motiong; Pagsanghan; Paranas; Pinabacdao; San Jorge; San Jose de Buan; San Sebastian; Santa Margarita; Santa Rita; Santo Niño; Tagapul-an; Talalora; Tarangnan; Villareal; Zumarraga
  - Barangays: 951
  - Districts: Legislative districts of Samar

Economy
  - Income class: 1st provincial income class
  - Poverty incidence: 24.9% (2023)
  - Revenue: ₱ 4,032 million (2024)
  - Assets: ₱ 12,563 million (2024)
  - Expenditure: ₱ 3,785 million (2024)
  - Liabilities: ₱ 5,672 million (2024)
- Time zone: UTC+8 (PHT)
- PSGC: 086000000
- IDD : area code: +63 (0)55
- ISO 3166 code: PH-WSA
- Spoken languages: Waray-Waray; Cebuano; Tagalog; English
- Website: samar.lgu-ph.com

Samar, officially the Province of Samar (Waray: Probinsya han Samar; Tagalog: Lalawigan ng Samar), or also known as Western Samar, is a province in the Philippines located in the Eastern Visayas region. Its capital is the city of Catbalogan while Calbayog is the most populous city in the province. It is bordered by Northern Samar, Eastern Samar, Leyte and Leyte Gulf, and includes several islands in the Samar Sea. Samar is connected to the island of Leyte via the San Juanico Bridge.

In 1768, Leyte and modern Samar were created out of the historical province of Samar. In 1965, Northern and Eastern Samar were created.

Fishing and agriculture are the major economic activities in the province.

On 8 November 2013, the province was significantly damaged by Typhoon Yolanda (Haiyan), particularly the towns of Basey, Marabut and Santa Rita.

== History ==
=== Pre-history ===
Around 2 million to 8000 B.C., based on geologic findings, during the ice ages (2 million years – 8000 B.C.), the islands of Mindoro, Luzon, and Mindanao were connected as one big island through the islands of Samar, Leyte and Bohol.

=== Pre-colonial era ===
In 8550 B.C., diggings in Sohoton Caves in Basey, Samar showed stone flake tools. In 1200 A.D., other diggings along the Basey River revealed other stone flakes used until the 13th century.

=== Spanish era ===
In 1543, the explorer Ruy López de Villalobos, first came to the island and named it Las Islas Filipinas.

In 1596, many names, such as Samal, Ibabao, and Tandaya, were given to Samar Island prior to the coming of the Spaniards in 1596. During the early days of Spanish occupation, Samar was under the jurisdiction of Cebu.

On October 15, 1596, the first Jesuit missionaries arrived in Tinago (now Dapdap) in Tarangnan. From Tinago, the missionaries, Fr. Francisco de Otazo, Bartolome Martes and Domingo Alonzo began teaching Catechism, healing the sick and spreading the Christian faith into the interior settlements.

On June 1, 1649, the people of Palapag led by Agustin Sumuroy revolted against the decree of Governor General Diego Fajardo requiring able bodied men from the Visayas for service at the Cavite Shipyards. Like wildfire, the revolt quickly spread to the neighboring town in the Northern and Western coast of Samar and to the nearby provinces of Bicol, Surigao, Cebu, Camiguin and as far as Zamboanga. It was suppressed in 1650 by the combined forces of the Spaniards, Lutaos, and Pampangos.

In 1735, Samar and Leyte were united into one province with Carigara, in Leyte, as the capital town. In 1747, Samar and Leyte were separated for administrative effectiveness. In 1762, complaints from the Jesuits that the division was not working well, thus it was reunited again by the approval from the King of Spain.

In 1768, Jesuits were expelled in all Spanish dominions. The Franciscans arrived on September 25, 1768, and took over the administration of 14 of the 17 parishes which were under the spiritual care of the Jesuits for almost 172 years. The administration of the remaining three parishes namely Guiuan, Balangiga and Basey in the south of Samar were given to the Augustinians.

In 1777, the two provinces were divided for the last time, it was approved in Madrid in 1786 and had been effective in 1799.

In 1803, Guiuan, Balangiga and Basey were turned over to the Franciscans for the lack of Augustinian priests.

The 1835 Census showed Samar had 18,671 native families and also had 174 Spanish-Filipino families.

On August 11, 1841, Queen Isabella II of Spain signed a Royal Decree declaring Samar as a province.

=== American era ===
The Battle of Catubig occurred on April 15–18, 1900 during the Philippine–American War.

On April 15, 1900, the Filipino guerrillas launched a surprise attack on a detachment of the US 43rd Infantry Regiment, forcing the Americans to abandon Catubig town after the four-day siege.

In 1901, the Balangiga massacre occurred during the Philippine–American War.

On September 28, 1901, the people of Balangiga, Giporlos, Lawaan and Quinapondan in Eastern Samar surprised and attacked the American forces stationed there, killing 48 American soldiers. To avenge their defeat, American general Jacob H. Smith ordered his men to turn Samar into a "howling wilderness".

On April 10, 1910, upon the papal bull of Pope Pius X separated the islands of Samar and Leyte from the Diocese of Cebu and erected the Diocese of Calbayog comprising both islands. Pablo Singzon de Anunciacion was named first Bishop and consecrated on June 12, 1910.

=== Japanese era ===
In 1942, the occupying Imperial Japanese forces arrived in the province of Samar.

On October 24, 1944, the Battle off Samar took place as Vice Admiral Takeo Kurita's Center Force warships clashed with several allied naval vessels in a collision course. His forces sank escort carrier USS Gambier Bay (CVE-73), destroyers USS Hoel (DD-533) and USS Johnston (DD-557), and escort destroyer USS Samuel B. Roberts (DE-413), but at a cost of his cruisers Chikuma, Chokai, and Suzuya. Despite being a tactical victory for the Imperial Japanese Navy, it did not alter the course of the Philippines campaign.

=== Postwar era ===
On June 19, 1965, the Philippine Congress along with the three Samar Representatives, Eladio T. Balite (1st District), Fernando R. Veloso (2nd District) and Felipe J. Abrigo (3rd District), approved Republic Act No. 4221 dividing the region of Samar into three divisions: Northern Samar, Eastern Samar, and Western Samar. Each region adopted a new capital: Catbalogan (Western Samar), Borongan (Eastern Samar), and Catarman (Northern Samar). The law was later ratified by the majority of voters through a plebiscite held on November 9, 1965. Esteban Piczon, the last governor of undivided Samar, continued as the first governor of Western Samar, while the aforementioned representatives were re-elected for the new provinces in 1965. The first provincial officials of Western Samar were elected on November 14, 1967, and on January 1, 1968, they officially assumed office.

On June 21, 1969, under Republic Act No. 5650, Western Samar was renamed Samar with Catbalogan still as the capital.

=== Martial law era ===
The beginning months of the 1970s had marked a period of turmoil and change in the Philippines, as well as in Samar. respectively During his bid to be the first Philippine president to be re-elected for a second term, Ferdinand Marcos launched an unprecedented number of foreign debt-funded public works projects. This caused the Philippine economy to take a sudden downwards turn known as the 1969 Philippine balance of payments crisis, which led to a period of economic difficulty and a significant rise of social unrest. With only a year left in his last constitutionally allowed term as president, Ferdinand Marcos placed the Philippines under Martial Law in September 1972 and thus retained the position for fourteen more years. This period in Philippine history is remembered for the Marcos administration's record of human rights abuses, particularly targeting political opponents, student activists, journalists, religious workers, farmers, and others who fought against the Marcos dictatorship. In Samar province itself, there were a number of Human rights violations particularly associated with the various political detainees at Camp Lukban in Barangay Maulong, which was then still under the Philippine Constabulary.

This era also saw the construction of the San Juanico Bridge between Samar and Leyte, which began as one of the high-visibility foreign-loan funded projects of Ferdinand Marcos’ 1969 reelection campaign, and finished four years later in time to be inaugurated on then-First Lady Imelda Marcos' birthday on July 2, 1973. The project was initially criticised as a white elephant by officials at the National Economic and Development Authority, noting that it was "useless and expensive to maintain", because its average daily traffic was too low to justify the cost of its construction. As a result, its construction has been associated with what has been called the Marcoses' "edifice complex" although economic activity in Samar and Leyte has since finally caught up with the bridge's intended function. At the time, its name was used as a slang term for onte of the torture methods used by the Marcos dictatorship, in which a person being beaten while the victim's head and feet lay on separate beds and the body is suspended as though to form a bridge.

The Marcos era was a time of significant deforestation in Samar and throughout the Philippines, with the forest cover of the Philippines shrinking until only 8% remained. In Samar, one of the major companies given Timber License Agreements (TLAs) to cut down trees during Martial Law was Dolores Timber, which was owned by Juan Ponce Enrile. Enrile was the government official Ferdinand Marcos put in place to approve Timber License Agreements during Martial Law.

=== Contemporary ===
The capital town Catbalogan became a component city by virtue of Republic Act No. 9391 which sought to convert the municipality into a city. The law was ratified on June 16, 2007. However, the cityhood status was lost twice in the years 2008 and 2010 after the League of Cities of the Philippines questioned the validity of the cityhood law. The cityhood status was reaffirmed after the Supreme Court finalized its ruling on February 15, 2011, which declared the cityhood law constitutional.

On November 8, 2013, Typhoon Haiyan, locally known as Typhoon Yolanda, hit Samar province. More than 300 people perished on the first day it hit the province.

In June 2018, a friendly fire incident happened between Philippine National Police and the Armed Forces of the Philippines under the administration of Rodrigo Duterte. The incident led to the death of numerous police officials of Waray ethnic origin.

On January 22, 2019, House Bill No. 8824 was introduced in the House of Representatives by Representative Edgar Mary Sarmiento to establish a new province called "Northwestern Samar", consisting of nine municipalities and one city of Samar's 1st congressional district, of which Calbayog would be the designated capital. The bill is yet to be reviewed.

== Geography ==
Samar province covers a total area of 6,048.03 square kilometers (2,335.16 sq mi) occupying the central-western sections of the Samar island in the Eastern Visayas region. The province is bordered on the north by Northern Samar, east by Eastern Samar, south by Leyte and Leyte Gulf, and west by the Samar Sea.

=== Administrative divisions ===
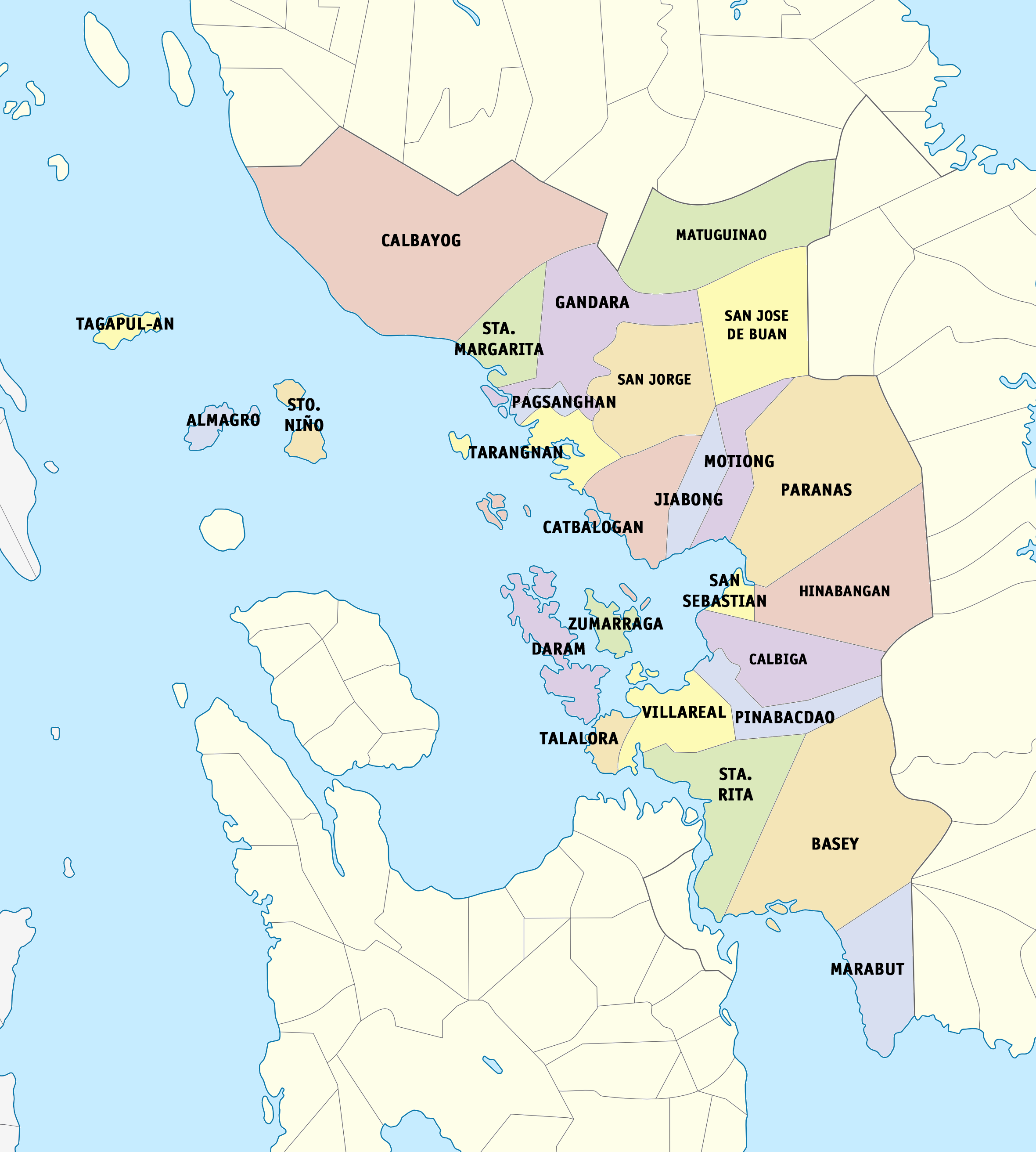
Political divisions of the province of Samar

The province of Samar comprises two congressional districts, 24 municipalities and two component cities. It has a total of 952 barangays.

- † Provincial capital and component city
- ∗ Component city
- Municipality

City or municipality^{[A]}		District	Population			±% p.a.	Area		Density		Barangay	Coordinates^{[B]}
			(2020)		(2015)		km^{2}	sq mi	/km^{2}	/sq mi		
Almagro		1st	1.2%	9,273	8,942	+0.69%	51.36	19.83	180	470	23	11°54′37″N 124°17′05″E
Basey		2nd	7.1%	56,685	55,480	+0.41%	513.01	198.07	110	280	51	11°16′58″N 125°04′10″E
Calbayog City	∗	1st	23.6%	186,960	183,851	+0.32%	880.74	340.06	210	540	157	12°04′01″N 124°35′41″E
Calbiga		2nd	2.9%	23,310	22,982	+0.27%	283.70	109.54	82	210	41	11°37′39″N 125°01′01″E
Catbalogan City	†	2nd	13.4%	106,440	103,879	+0.46%	274.22	105.88	390	1,000	57	11°46′31″N 124°52′58″E
Daram		2nd	5.2%	41,608	42,879	−0.57%	140.26	54.15	300	780	58	11°38′06″N 124°47′43″E
Gandara		1st	4.4%	35,242	34,434	+0.44%	573.49	221.43	61	160	69	12°00′48″N 124°48′41″E
Hinabangan		2nd	1.7%	13,693	13,673	+0.03%	460.08	177.64	30	78	21	11°42′05″N 125°03′57″E
Jiabong		2nd	2.4%	19,205	18,342	+0.88%	67.70	26.14	280	730	35	11°45′46″N 124°57′01″E
Marabut		2nd	2.2%	17,842	16,962	+0.97%	143.55	55.42	120	310	24	11°06′27″N 125°12′45″E
Matuguinao		1st	0.9%	7,364	7,288	+0.20%	172.51	66.61	43	110	20	12°08′38″N 124°53′07″E
Motiong		2nd	1.9%	15,276	15,156	+0.15%	174.40	67.34	88	230	29	11°46′42″N 124°59′55″E
Pagsanghan		1st	1.0%	7,959	7,945	+0.03%	30.00	11.58	270	700	13	11°57′55″N 124°43′16″E
Paranas (Wright)		2nd	4.1%	32,374	30,557	+1.11%	556.12	214.72	58	150	44	11°46′17″N 125°01′21″E
Pinabacdao		2nd	2.3%	18,136	18,252	−0.12%	183.06	70.68	99	260	24	11°36′50″N 124°59′04″E
San Jorge		1st	2.2%	17,579	17,184	+0.43%	241.20	93.13	73	190	41	11°58′46″N 124°49′30″E
San Jose de Buan		2nd	1.0%	7,767	7,769	0.00%	366.90	141.66	21	54	14	12°03′06″N 125°01′35″E
San Sebastian		2nd	1.1%	8,704	8,057	+1.48%	39.07	15.09	220	570	14	11°42′39″N 125°01′03″E
Santa Margarita		1st	3.4%	26,816	26,348	+0.34%	129.12	49.85	210	540	36	12°02′16″N 124°39′30″E
Santa Rita		2nd	5.3%	42,384	41,591	+0.36%	411.77	158.99	100	260	38	11°27′05″N 124°56′29″E
Santo Niño		1st	1.6%	12,519	12,863	−0.51%	29.53	11.40	420	1,100	13	11°55′32″N 124°26′56″E
Tagapul-an		1st	1.1%	8,805	8,473	+0.73%	28.70	11.08	310	800	14	12°02′54″N 124°09′27″E
Talalora		2nd	1.0%	7,856	8,057	−0.48%	27.96	10.80	280	730	11	11°31′42″N 124°50′10″E
Tarangnan		1st	3.2%	25,713	24,992	+0.54%	132.49	51.15	190	490	41	11°54′08″N 124°44′47″E
Villareal		2nd	3.5%	27,394	28,230	−0.57%	98.54	38.05	280	730	38	11°34′03″N 124°55′41″E
Zumarraga		2nd	2.1%	16,279	16,295	−0.02%	38.55	14.88	420	1,100	25	11°38′22″N 124°50′32″E
Total				793,183	780,481	+0.31%	6,048.03	2,335.16	130	340	951	(see GeoGroup box)
1. Former names are italicized.; 2. Coordinates mark the city/town center, and are sortable by latitude.; 3. Dashes (—) in cells indicate unavailable information.

== Demographics ==
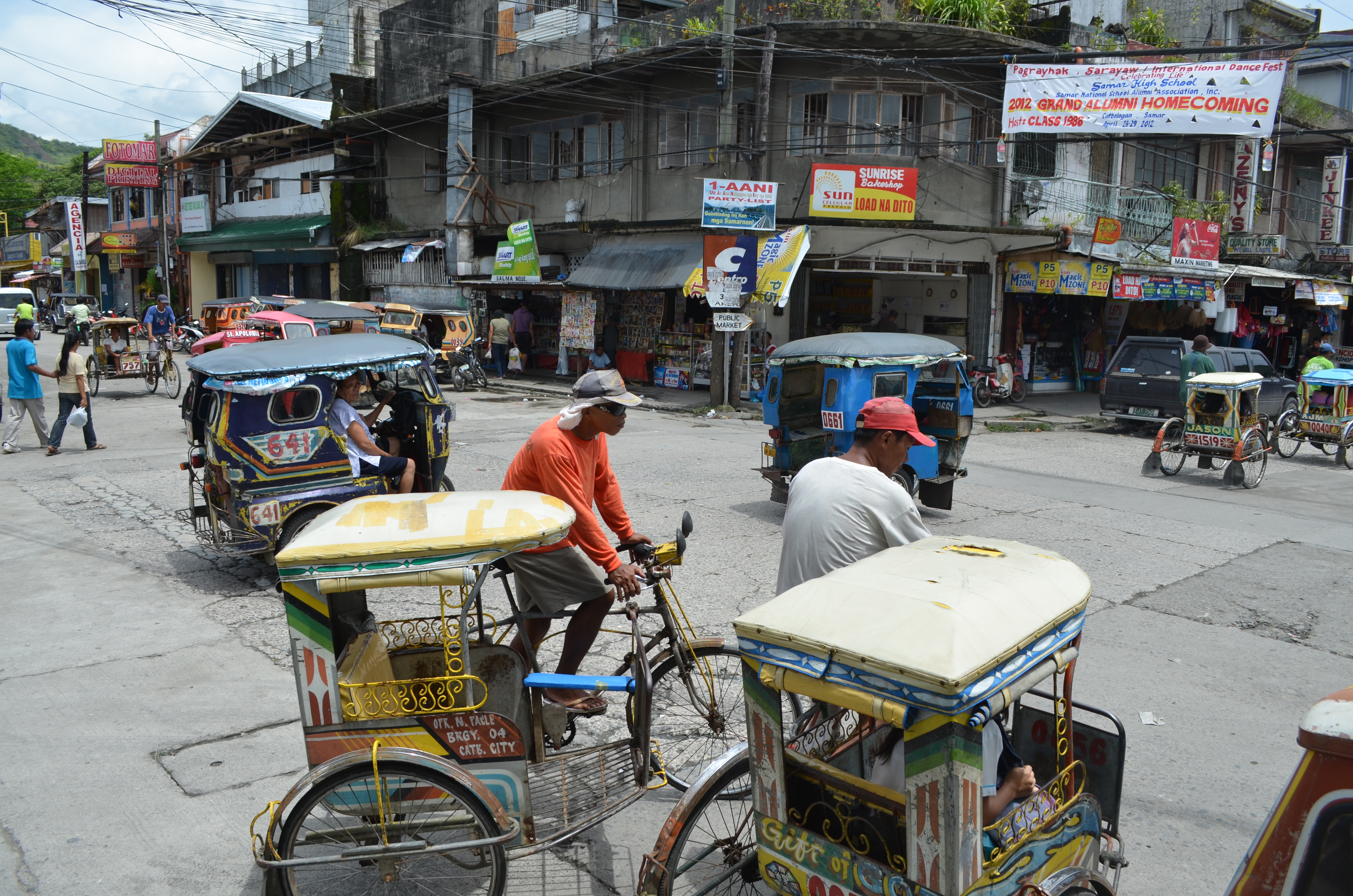
Catbalogan, the provincial capital

Population census of Samar (province)
Year	Pop.	±% p.a.
1903	118,912	—
1918	168,668	+2.36%
1939	236,909	+1.63%
1948	331,521	+3.80%
1960	368,823	+0.89%
1970	442,244	+1.83%
1975	478,378	+1.59%
1980	501,439	+0.95%
1990	533,733	+0.63%
1995	589,373	+1.88%
2000	641,124	+1.82%
2007	695,149	+1.12%
2010	733,377	+1.97%
2015	780,481	+1.19%
2020	793,183	+0.34%
2024	806,179	+0.39%
Source: Philippine Statistics Authority

The population of Samar (province) in the 2024 census was 806,179 people, with a density of 130 inhabitants per square kilometer or 340 inhabitants per square mile.

=== Religion ===
==== Catholicism ====
Samar (Western Samar) is predominantly Roman Catholic. The Catholic Hierarchy (2014) states that 95 percent of its population adhere to Roman Catholicism.

==== Others ====
Some other Christian believers constitute most of the remainder such as Rizalista, Iglesia Filipina Independiente, Born-again Christians, Iglesia ni Cristo, Baptists, Methodists, Jehovah's Witnesses, The Church of Jesus Christ of Latter-day Saints, Seventh-day Adventist, and Members Church of God International (MCGI). Muslims are also present and a few mosques are located within the province.

=== Languages and dialects ===
Languages Spoken (2000)
Language	Speakers
Waray	695,342
Cebuano	30,278
Binisaya	4,069
Tagalog	2,340
Boholano	877
Others	4,223
Not Reported	5,316

Residents of Samar are mostly Waray, the fifth largest cultural-linguistic group in the country. 90.2 percent of the household population speaks the Waray-Waray language, while 9.8 percent also speak Cebuano; 8.1 percent Boholano; 0.07 percent Tagalog; and 0.5 percent other languages.

There are two types of Waray spoken in the province, Waray Lineyte-Samarnon which is spoken from the southernmost tip of the province up to the municipality of Gandara and Waray Calbayog, an intermediary between the Waray of Northern Samar and the Waray of Samar, spoken in Calbayog, Santa Margarita, and in some parts of Tagapul-an, Santo Niño, Almagro and Matuguinao.

== Economy ==
Poverty incidence of Samar (%)

Source: Philippine Statistics Authority

== Government ==
Current Provincial Government Officials (2025-2028)

- Governor: Sharee Ann T. Tan (Nacionalista)
- Vice-Governor: Arnold V. Tan (PFP)

Sangguniang Panlalawigan Members

1st District

- Edward James B. Clemens (Nacionalista)
- Abbie Joy A. Irigon (Nacionalista)
- Dawn Marie D. Acosta (Nacionalista)
- Emelly D. Oleja (Nacionalista)
- Anecio R. Guades (Nacionalista)

2nd District

- Beethoven M. Bermejo (Nacionalista)
- Yolanda T. Tan (Nacionalista)
- Ma. Elpa E. De Jesus (Nacionalista)
- Luzviminda L. Nacario (Nacionalista)
- Jade Kie R. Tiu (Nacionalista)

Ex-Officio Members

- Ruby Delector (President, Liga ng mga Barangay)
- Rita Rama (President, PCL)
- Ingrid Cabarriban (President, Panlalawigang Pederasyon ng Sangguniang Kabataan)

== House of Representatives ==
District	Representative	Party	Term	Bloc
1st	Stephen James T. Tan	Nacionalista	2	Minority
2nd	Reynolds Michael T. Tan	Lakas	2	Minority

== Former governors ==
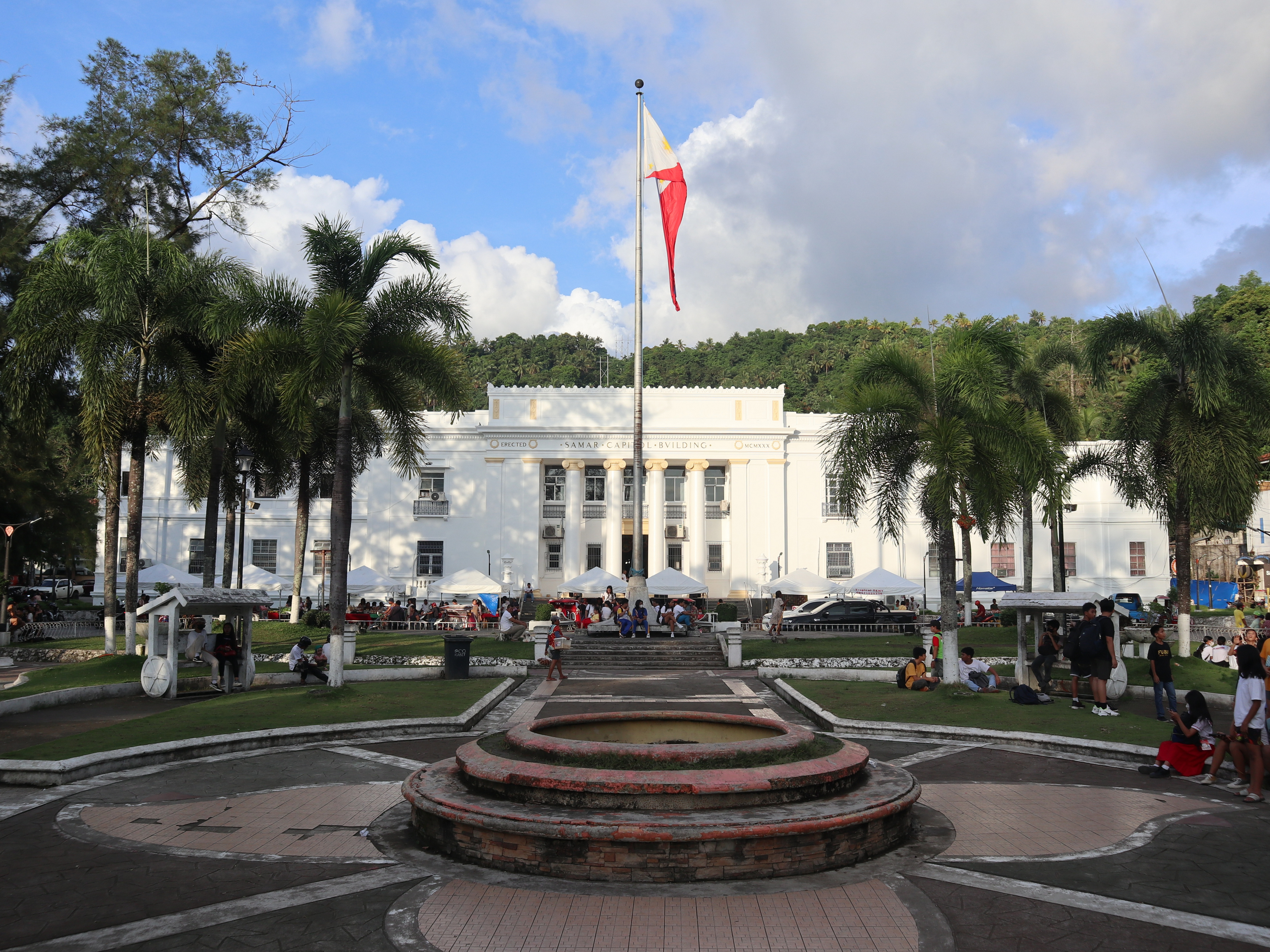
Samar Provincial Capitol

== Notable personalities ==
19th & 20th Centuries

- Senate President José Avelino — the first President of the Senate of the Third Republic of the Philippines and the second President of the Liberal Party came from Calbayog, Samar. He was Senate President pro tempore to President Manuel Quezon prior to the establishment of the Commonwealth. He was the grandfather of Filipino actor Paulo Avelino.
- Lieutenant Benedicto Nijaga— nicknamed Biktoy, one of the "Thirteen Martyrs of Bagumbayan", executed on January 11, 1897, in Bagumbayan (Luneta Park). During a raid of a printing press in Binondo, the Spaniards found and confiscated subversive documents including a list of members of the Katipunan. Benedicto Nijaga was on the list as a collector of revolutionary funds. Upon the order of Gov. Polavieja to arbitrarily arrest all suspected members of the Katipunan, Nijaga was arrested while he was campaigning for revolutionary funds.
- Cardinal Julio Rosales — (September 18, 1906 – June 2, 1983) the second Archbishop of Cebu, was a Filipino cardinal of the Roman Catholic Church. A native of Calbayog, he made his studies at the Seminary of Calbayog and was ordained in his hometown on June 2, 1929. From 1929 to 1946, he did pastoral work in the diocese of Calbayog. He was consecrated bishop of Tagbilaran on September 21, 1946.
- Lucio Godina (March 8, 1908 – November 24, 1936) & Simplicio Godina (March 8, 1908 - December 8, 1936) — were pygopagus conjoined twins from the island of Samar in the Philippines. Born in 1908, these boys from the Philippines later made the trip to the United States, where they became sideshow attractions in such hubs of ‘entertainment’ as Coney Island. In 1928, after various legal difficulties – including narrowly avoiding jail when a man was injured in an alleged drunk driving incident – they married identical (but not conjoined) twin sisters, Natividad and Victorina Matos, in Manila. At the age of 21 they married Natividad and Victorina Matos, who were identical twins. They performed in various sideshow acts, including in an orchestra on Coney Island and in dance with their wives. After Lucio died of rheumatic fever in New York City, doctors operated to separate him from Simplicio. Simplicio survived the operation, but died shortly thereafter due to spinal meningitis.

21st Century

- Nemesio Baldesco— a pedicab driver from Calbayog who earned respect in the field of literary works in Waray. He is a recipient of Gawad Parangal of UMPIL (Unyon ng mga Manunulat sa Pilipinas). He is known as the “Father of Waray Poetry” (Amay han Siday).
- Dr. Carmelita Abdurahman — she served as commissioner for Samar-Leyte language at Komisyon sa Wikang Filipino (KWF).
- Archbishop Pedro Rosales Dean, Jr., D.D., Ph.L., S.T.L. — (born 21 February 1930) is the Archbishop emeritus of Palo from Calbayog since the appointment of Archbishop Jose S. Palma as his successor. He served the Archdiocese of Palo from 12 October 1985 until 18 March 2006.
- Chito S. Roño —(born April 26, 1954), also known as Sixto Kayko, is a Filipino writer, film producer and film director from Calbayog known for his expansive vision and special-effects-heavy films, most notably Yamashita: The Tiger's Treasure (2001) for which he won the Metro Manila Film Festival for best director. He is also known for his 1997 film Nasaan ang Puso which earned him his first MMFF for best director. There is an annual literary and visual arts competition held in Samar in honor of him.
- Tessie Tomas — (born October 31, 1950), a Filipino actress and TV host from Catbalogan, best known for being the host of the ABS-CBN talk show Teysi ng Tahanan. In an interview with GMA Network's Tunay Na Buhay, Tomas recalled working for an ad agency prior to her career as a presenter and actress. Tessie later appeared in both comedic and dramatic roles, notably in the 2012 remake of the film Mundo Man ay Magunaw and 2015's Buena Familia. In 2018, Tomas played a supporting role in the ABS-CBN soap opera The Blood Sisters.
- Michael Cinco— a Filipino fashion designer from Catbalogan, Samar. He launched his eponymous fashion line in Dubai in 2003.
- Rosalio "Yoyong" Martires — (born September 9, 1951), a former Filipino basketball player, actor and comedian from Catbalogan. He played for San Miguel in the Manila Industrial and Commercial Athletic Association and the Philippine Basketball Association between 1972 and 1982. In 1972, he appeared at the Olympic Games in Munich, Germany as a member of the country's national basketball team. He was a fleet footed guard specializing in steals/interceptions and assists.
- Bishop Maximiano Tuazon Cruz — born in Catbalogan, Philippines and was ordained a priest on November 30, 1947. He was appointed titular bishop to Tanudaia as well as auxiliary bishop to the Diocese of Calbayog on November 10, 1987, and ordained bishop on December 1, 1987. He was appointed bishop to the Diocese of Calbayog on December 21, 1994, and retired from diocese on January 13, 1999. He died on October 9, 2013, at age 90.
- Rosita “Rose” Bradborn — (born on 1973) is a Philippines international lawn bowler from Daram, Samar. She competed at the 2008 World Outdoor Bowls Championship and 2012 World Outdoor Bowls Championship but came to prominence when winning a bronze medal at the 2016 World Outdoor Bowls Championship in Christchurch in the fours with Hazel Jagonoy, Ronalyn Greenlees and Sonia Bruce. In 2018, he bagged three medals again in international tourneys.
- Sergio Apostol — (born January 17, 1935) is a Filipino politician born in Catbalogan. In 2008, Sergio Apostol was Chief Presidential Legal Counsel for Philippine President Gloria Macapagal Arroyo. On October 8, 2008, Eduardo Ermita confirmed Apostol's resignation, effective October 30, to prepare for his candidacy, for Leyte congressional seat, in the 2010 Philippine general election. Apostol is a member of the board of Union Bank and the legal consultant of the SSS’ Social Security Commission (SSC). After winning his district's seat as a Lakas-CMD party candidate of Arroyo, Apostol switched allegiance to the Liberal party of Benigno Aquino, the winner of the 2010 Presidential election.
- Justice Antonio Eduardo Nachura— former Associate Justice of the Supreme Court of the Philippines from Catbalogan, Samar. He took his oath of office as Associate Justice on February 7, 2007, and occupied the position until his mandatory retirement on June 13, 2011. Previously, Nachura had been Solicitor-General of the Philippines at the time his appointment to the Court was announced on January 31, 2007, by then-Philippine President Gloria Macapagal Arroyo.
- Romero Federico Saenz Quimbo — (born December 12, 1969), also known as Miro Quimbo, is a Filipino politician who currently represents Marikina's 2nd Legislative District in the House of Representatives of the Philippines. He succeeded then-Rep. Del R. De Guzman who won as mayor. Quimbo spent the first two years of elementary school at the Sacred Heart College (now Saint Mary’s College of Catbalogan) in Catbalogan, Samar. He moved to the Marist School in Marikina where he eventually finished his elementary and secondary education.
- Joel Porlares — (born January 1, 1961) the fourteenth Supreme Bishop of the Philippine Independent Church, officially the Iglesia Filipina Independiente and informally the "Aglipayan Church". The supreme bishop serves as the spiritual head, chief pastor, and chief executive officer of the said church. Porlares is the 14th in a line of succession that goes back from the first Supreme Bishop and prolific revolutionary figure, Gregorio Aglipay. He has been the incumbent supreme bishop since June 2023. Although born in Tacloban, Porlares was raised in the municipality of Basey in the province of Samar.
- Tom Rodriguez — a TV host, singer and actor from Catbalogan, Samar. He was born in Subic Naval Base in Zambales to an American serviceman father and a Filipina mother. One of six siblings, he moved with his two brothers and three sisters with their mother to Pinabacdao, Samar (where their mother hails from). But they grew up in nearby Catbalogan, also in Samar, where Rodriguez studied at Saint Mary's College of Catbalogan (formerly Sacred Heart College) from kindergarten to elementary. He popularized the OPM song “Ikaw Ang Sagot”.
- Mel Senen Sarmiento — a Calbayognon politician who was a former member of the Philippine House of Representatives representing the 1st Legislative District of Samar from 2010 to 2016. He also served as Secretary General of the Liberal Party. He served as the Vice Mayor of Calbayog from 1992 to 1995 and Mayor from 2001 to 2010. He was also the Secretary General of the League of Cities of the Philippines from 2004 to 2010. He also served as the final Secretary of the Interior and Local Government under President Benigno Aquino III after Jesse Robredo and Mar Roxas.
