= Zumarraga =

Zumarraga or Zumárraga may refer to:

- Zumarraga, Samar, the Philippines
- Zumarraga, Spain
- Juan de Zumárraga, the first bishop in Mexico
