= Guns, goons, and gold =

Three Gs of Philippine politics

The phrase "guns, goons, and gold", sometimes referred to as the "Three Gs of Philippine Politics", was a catchphrase coined by media to describe the violence and vote-buying that characterized the political campaign period in the Philippines, beginning with the presidential reelection campaign of 1969, declining only with the advent of electronic voting machines during the elections of 2010.

== In popular culture ==
- The 1977 Eddie Romero classic Banta ng Kahapon starring Vic Vargas, Bembol Roco, Roland Dantes, and Chanda Romero was set during the 1969 campaign period. The motif of "guns, goons, and gold" was prominently featured.
- The 1991 Jun Urbano political comedy Juan Tamad at Mister Shooli sa Mongolian Barbecue also prominently featured the motif of "guns, goons, and gold," portraying the belief that mainstream politicians at the time the film was released could not get reelected without violence or vote-buying.

== See also ==
- Ferdinand Marcos presidential campaign, 1969
