= Ferdinand Marcos 1969 presidential campaign =

Overview of the second presidential campaign of Ferdinand Marcos

Ferdinand Marcos presidential campaign, 1969
- Campaign: 1969 Philippine presidential election
- Candidate: Ferdinand Marcos
- Affiliation: Nacionalista Party
- Status: Won election: November 11, 1969
- Slogan: Forward with Marcos

The 1969 reelection campaign of Ferdinand Marcos started in July 1969 when incumbent President Ferdinand Marcos was unanimously nominated as the Nacionalista's presidential candidate, and concluded when Marcos won an unprecedented second term. With Fernando Lopez as his running mate, he defeated the Liberal slate of Sergio Osmeña Jr. (son of former President Sergio Osmeña), and Genaro Magsaysay (younger brother of late President Ramon Magsaysay).

During the campaign, Marcos launched US$50 million worth in infrastructure projects. Marcos was reported to have spent PHP100 for every PHP1 that his opponent Osmeña spent, including PHP24 million in Cebu alone.

Time and Newsweek called the 1969 election the "dirtiest, most violent and most corrupt" in modern Philippine history. The term "Three Gs", meaning "guns, goons, and gold" was used to describe the administration's election tactics of vote-buying, terrorism and ballot snatching.

Marcos' spending during the campaign triggered a balance of payments crisis. Marcos asked the International Monetary Fund (IMF) for help, and the IMF offered a debt restructuring deal. Compliant policies were enacted, including a greater emphasis on exports and the relaxation of peso controls. The peso was allowed to decline, resulting in inflation and social unrest.

== Background ==
Ferdinand Marcos won his first campaign for the Philippine Presidency in November 1965, and was inaugurated just before New Year's Day in December the same year. Under the 1935 Philippine Constitution which was in force at the time, Marcos was supposed to be allowed a maximum of two four-year terms as president.

== Formal nomination ==
The formal beginning of the 1969 campaign can be dated to the July 1969 meeting of the Philippines' Nacionalista Party, in which Ferdinand Marcos was formally nominated as the party's presidential candidate. A meeting of the party's ruling junta had met a week earlier to assure that the nomination would be unanimous.

== "Guns, goons, and gold" ==
With his popularity already beefed up by debt-funded spending, Marcos' popularity made it very likely that he would win the election, but he decided, as National Artist for Literature Nick Joaquin reported in the Philippines Free Press, to "leave nothing to chance." Time and Newsweek would eventually call the 1969 election the "dirtiest, most violent and most corrupt" in Philippine modern history, with the term "Three Gs", meaning "guns, goons, and gold" coined to describe administration's election tactics of vote-buying, terrorism and ballot snatching.

Marcos used the military and the government bureaucracy for his campaign, with members of the Armed Forces of the Philippines participating in putting up campaign propaganda.

Marcos also launched US$50 million worth in infrastructure projects in an effort to curry favor with the electorate. This rapid campaign spending was so massive that it would be responsible for the Balance of Payments Crisis of 1970, whose inflationary effect would cause social unrest leading all the way up to the proclamation of Martial Law in 1972. Marcos was reported to have spent ₱100 (equivalent to ₱8,546 in 2021) for every ₱1 (equivalent to ₱85.46 in 2021) that Osmeña spent, using up ₱24,000,000 (equivalent to ₱2,050,990,837 in 2021) in Cebu alone.

=== Election violence ===
The most violent election-related incidents took place in Batanes, where Philippine Constabulary officers, paramilitary groups, and hired guns essentially took over the island, and motorcycle-riding thugs rode around terrorizing voters and Comelec officials, and beating up opposition leaders.

== Campaign spending and the 1969-1970 balance of payments crisis ==
Government spending during the leadup to Marcos' 1969 presidential campaign is generally acknowledged by economists as the major cause of the Marcos administration's first major economic crisis. Leaning on foreign aid funds to assure his re-election to a second term, Marcos launched US$50 million worth in infrastructure projects in 1969 to create an impression of progress for the electorate.

This campaign spending spree was so massive that it caused a balance of payments crisis, so the government was compelled to seek a debt rescheduling plan with the International Monetary Fund. The IMF mandated stabilization plan which accompanied the agreement included numerous macroeconomic interventions, including a shift away from the Philippines’ historical economic strategy of import substitution industrialization and towards export-oriented industrialization; and the allowing the Philippine Peso to float and devalue. The inflationary effect these interventions had on the local economy brought about the social unrest which was the rationalization for the proclamation of martial law in 1972.

== Results ==
Presidential, legislative and local elections were held on November 11, 1969, resulting in an unprecedented second full term as President of the Philippines for Incumbent President Marcos. Incumbent Vice President Fernando Lopez was also elected to a third full term as Vice President of the Philippines. Twelve other candidates ran for president, however ten of those were widely considered "nuisance candidates," and did not garner a significant number of votes in the election.

== In popular media ==
- The 1977 Eddie Romero classic Banta ng Kahapon starring Vic Vargas, Bembol Roco, Roland Dantes and Chanda Romero was set during the 1969 campaign period. The motif of "guns, goons, and gold" was prominently featured.
