= Nemesio Baldesco =

Filipino poet

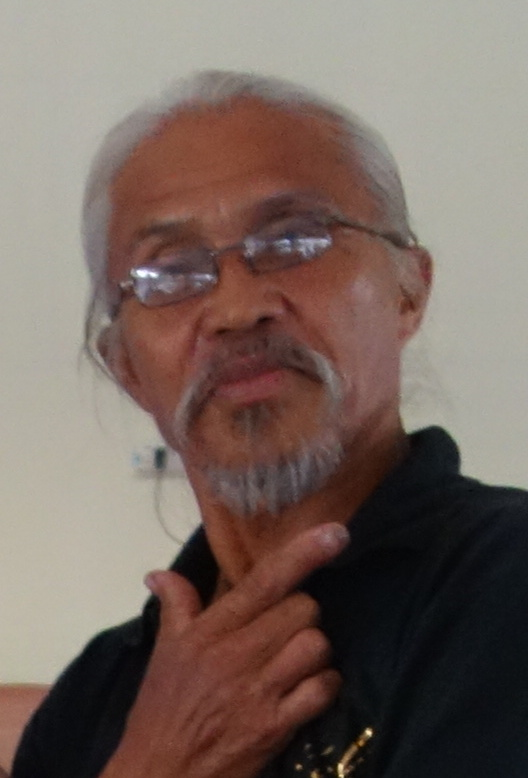
- Baldesco in 2014
- Born: 1954 or 1955 (age 71–72)
- Occupations: Poet, pedicab driver
- Writing career
- Language: Waray
- Notable awards: Gantimpalang Ani Award for Poetry; Gawad Komisyon Karangalang Banggit for Poetry; Gawad Parangal of UMPIL

Nemesio “Totoy” S. Baldesco Sr. (born 1954 or 1955) is a Filipino poet and pedicab driver from Calbayog, Samar who primarily does literary works in Waray. He is a recipient of Gawad Parangal of UMPIL (Unyon ng mga Manunulat sa Pilipinas). He is known as the “Father of Waray Poetry” (Amay han Siday).

He was also given the Gantimpalang Ani Award for Poetry in 1994 by the Cultural Center of the Philippines (CCP) and the Gawad Komisyon Karangalang Banggit for Poetry by the Komisyon sa Wikang Filipino (KWF) in 2007.

== Personal life ==
Baldesco is married to Ana Baldesco who is also a writer. They have children who are also involved in arts and literature.
