= Yan Jizhou =

Chinese film director (1917–2018)

- 严寄洲
- Born: August 1917; Changshu, Jiangsu, China
- Died: 21 June 2018 (aged 100); Beijing, China
- Education: Counter-Japanese Military and Political University
- Occupation: Film director
- Notable work: Struggles in an Ancient City, Tiger Heroes, Heroes at Sea, Two Good Brothers, Early Morning Chill

Yan Jizhou (Chinese: 严寄洲; Wade–Giles: Yen Chi-chou; August 1917 – 21 June 2018) was a Chinese film director. Having fought on the frontline during the Chinese Civil War, he made popular war films in the 1950s and 1960s including Struggles in an Ancient City, Tiger Heroes, Heroes at Sea, and Two Good Brothers, which have come to be regarded as "red classic films". He won the Golden Rooster Award for Lifetime Achievement in 2012 and the Outstanding Contribution Award at the 2017 China Film Director's Guild Awards.

== Early life and wartime career ==
Yan was born in August 1917 in Changshu, Jiangsu Province, and moved to nearby Shanghai in his youth to find work. After the city fell to Japanese occupation following the Battle of Shanghai, he went to the Communist base in Yan'an in 1938. He received military training at the Counter-Japanese Military and Political University, but was assigned to work in the army's drama troupe after graduation.

During the Chinese Civil War, Yan, armed with musical instruments and simple weapons, was part of a "Seven Person Drama Troupe" which travelled to the frontline in the summer of 1946 to perform propaganda dramas for People's Liberation Army troops. As many soldiers questioned why they were now fighting the Kuomintang after so many years of fighting the Japanese, Yan's troupe performed plays that blamed the Kuomintang leader Chiang Kai-shek for starting the civil war and exalted the bravery of the Communist soldiers.

In 1947, he fought in the battle to take the city of Datong in Shanxi. His unit suffered heavy casualties, and when the commanders of his company and its two platoons were all killed in action, Yan temporarily assumed leadership of the company for seven days. General He Long publicly praised him after the battle.

== Career as director ==
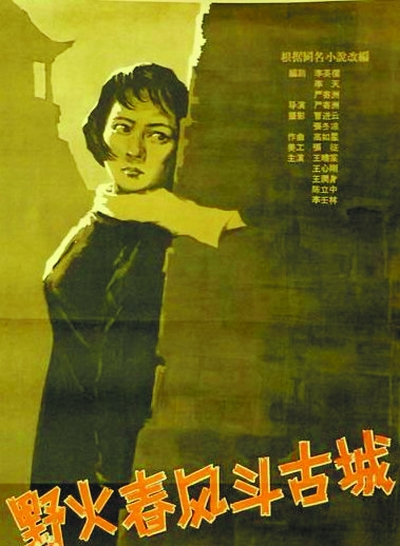
Struggles in an Ancient City (1963)

After the founding of the People's Republic of China in 1949, Yan worked as a director for the August First Film Studio of the People's Liberation Army. He directed many popular war films, most famously Struggles in an Ancient City (野火春风斗古城, 1963), Tiger Heroes (英雄虎胆, 1958), Heroes at Sea (海鹰, 1959) and Two Good Brothers (哥俩好, 1962), which are now considered "red classic films". Tiger Heroes, starring Wang Xiaotang and Yu Yang, is regarded as one of the most influential spy films in the history of Chinese cinema. Struggles in an Ancient City, set in a Japanese-occupied provincial city, starred the actor Wang Xingang and actress Wang Xiaotang, who played the double role of two heroic sisters.

Yan's 1957 film, Early Morning Chill (五更寒), which he said was made with his "heart and soul", was a drastically different work. Unlike his other films which featured good-looking movie stars, its protagonists are a short, plain-looking man with a limp and a seductive widow of a landlord's son. Because it portrayed traitors of the Communist revolution in a sympathetic light, it was criticized even before the Cultural Revolution began in 1966.

During the Cultural Revolution (1966–1976), Yan was denounced as a "counterrevolutionary" and his films were labelled as "giant poisonous weeds". He was subjected to struggle sessions but survived largely unscathed thanks to protection afforded by the senior army general Li Desheng. Li resisted the demand by Jiang Qing, Mao Zedong's radical wife, to imprison Yan for 20 years.

After the end of the Cultural Revolution, many of Yan's works came to be regarded as "red classics", although to his disappointment, Early Morning Chill was largely neglected and forgotten. He was recognized with the Golden Rooster Award for Lifetime Achievement in 2012 and the Outstanding Contribution Award at the 2017 China Film Director's Guild Awards.

== Filmography ==
| Year | Title | Role | Notes |
|---|---|---|---|
| 1980 | MOONLIGHT ON SECOND SPRING | Director | |
| 1978 | LIEZI JIU-SHI-JIU HAO | Director | |
| 1977 | WHAN SHUI QIAN SHAN | Director | |

== Death ==
Yan died on 21 June 2018 at the 301 Hospital in Beijing, aged 100.
