= Boboy Salonga: Batang Tondo =

1992 action film starring Jeric Raval

- Directed by: Junn P. Cabreira
- Written by: Jojo Lapus
- Produced by: Simon C. Ongpin
- Starring: Jeric Raval; Monica Herrera; Vic Vargas; Mark Gil; Rina Reyes; Jennifer Mendoza; Kevin Delgado; Francis M
- Cinematography: Rudy Diño
- Edited by: Joe Solo
- Music by: Mon del Rosario
- Production company: OctoArts Films
- Distributed by: OctoArts Films
- Release date: May 20, 1992
- Country: Philippines
- Language: Filipino

Boboy Salonga: Batang Tondo (lit. 'Boboy Salonga: Tondo Kid') is a 1992 Filipino action film directed by Junn P. Cabreira. The film stars Jeric Raval in the title role, alongside Monica Herrera, Vic Vargas, Mark Gil, Rina Reyes, Francis Magalona, Jennifer Mendoza, Ronel Victor, Ali Sotto and Dick Israel. Produced and distributed by OctoArts Films, the film was theatrically released on May 20, 1992.

Critic Justino Dormiendo of the Manila Standard gave the film a negative review, criticizing its lack of believability and calling it another example of Philippine cinema's "gross commercialization" through its tendency toward violence.

The film is streaming online on YouTube.

== Cast ==
- Jeric Raval as Boboy Salonga
- Monica Herrera as Rhea
- Vic Vargas as Victor Salonga
- Mark Gil as Lt. Ventura
- Rina Reyes as Marina
- Francis Magalona as Obet
- Jennifer Mendoza as Elsa
- Ronel Victor as Bakal
- Ali Sotto as Dolor Salonga
- Dick Israel as Cpl. Tumang
- Kevin Delgado as Bogart
- Mike Castillo as Bakal's Gang
- Gerald Ejercito as Bakal's Gang
- Jason Roman as Bakal's Gang
- Jet Gavino as Bakal's Gang
- Mikko Manson as Bakal's Gang
- Ernie Ortega as Chief of Police
- Ernie Forte as Kadyo
- Vic Belaro as Terio
- Jimmy Reyes as Bodyguard
- Jerry Acosta as Bodyguard
- Eric De Vera as Sward
- Che-Che Veneracion as Che-Che
- Ronnie Francisco as Mr. Ching

== Production ==
After the success of actor Jeric Raval's debut film Kalabang Mortal ni Baby Ama (also known as Primitivo 'Ebok' Ala) at the box office, he was next given the lead role by OctoArts Films in Boboy Salonga: Batang Tondo. The film is also rapper Francis Magalona's first film since taking a hiatus from films after starring in Iputok Mo... Dadapa Ako! (Hard to Die) in 1990.

== Release ==
Boboy Salonga was released in theaters in the Philippines in May 1992.

=== Critical response ===
Justino Dormiendo, writing for the Manila Standard, gave Boboy Salonga a negative review, considering it as "another proof of the unrelieved proclivity to sex and violence by our filmmakers." He criticized the film's story as lacking believability, while the filmmaking, "from Jojo Lapus's script and Junn Cabreira's direction down to the cast — with the possible exception of [Vic] Vargas and Ali Sotto — smack of the gross commercialization of local cinema, mainly through the violence..."
