= Tian Hua =

Chinese actress

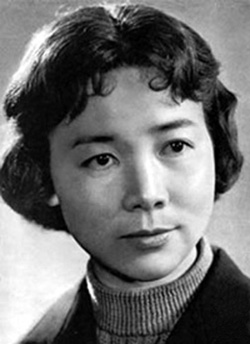
- Born: 14 December 1928 (age 97); Tangxian, Hebei, China
- Occupation: actress
- Years active: 1940～present
- Spouse: Su Fan (m. 1949)
- Children: 3
- Awards: Golden Rooster Awards – Lifetime Achievement Award; 2010

Chinese name
- Traditional Chinese: 田華
- Simplified Chinese: 田华
Transcriptions

Tian Hua (born 14 December 1928) is a Chinese actress most famous for her role of Xi Er in the 1950 film The White-haired Girl.

== Personal life ==
In 1949, Tian married Su Fan, who was one of the stage designer of PRC founding ceremony. Tian is the best friend of actress Zhao Lirong. In 2015, a website reported that Tian's husband and son suffered from cancer, and ran out of money for medical treatment.

== Selected filmography ==
Year	Title	Role	Notes
1950	The White Haired Girl 白毛女	Xi Er	
1958	A Perfect Marriage	Fan Lingzhi	
1958	The Party's Daughter 党的女儿	Li Yumei	
1962	To Liberate Hainan Island 碧海丹心	Xiao Ding	
1963	Duo Yin 夺印	Hu Sufang	Nominated - Hundred Flowers Award for Best Supporting Actress
1965	Secret Map 秘密图纸	Shi Yun	
1978	Slave's Daughter 奴隶的女儿	Zeng Weizhi	
1980	In and Out of Court 法庭内外	Shan Qin	Nominated - Golden Rooster Award for Best Actress
1981	Xu Mao and His Daughters 许茂和他的女儿们	Yan Shaochun	
2012	Full Circle 飞越老人院	Shi Yun	
