= Daram, Samar =

Municipality in Samar, Philippines

Daram
- Municipality
- Municipality of Daram
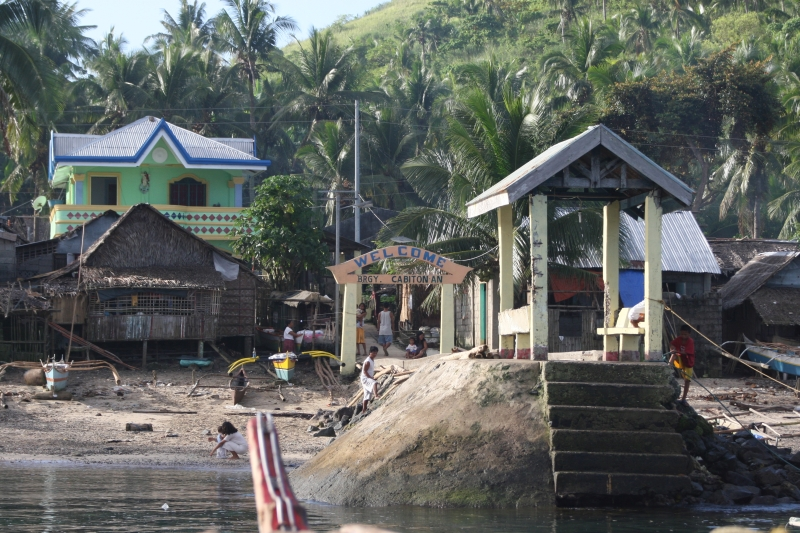
- Port of Cabiton-An

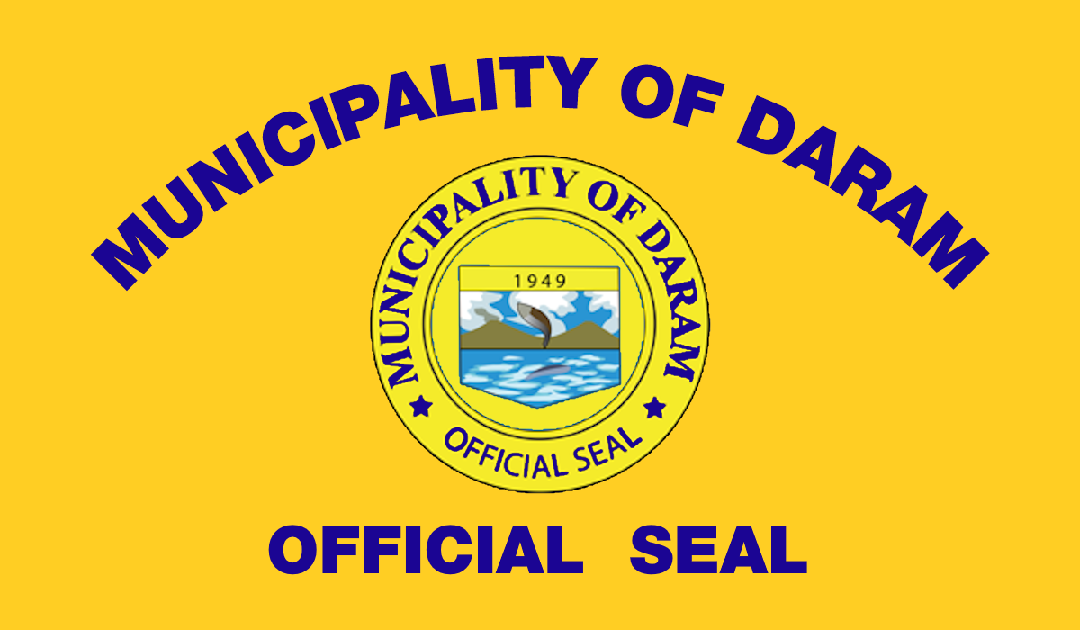
- Flag Seal

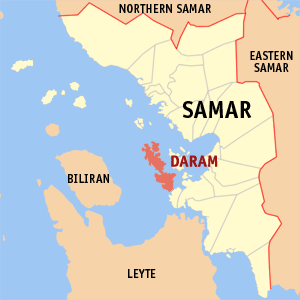
- Map of Samar with Daram highlighted
- Interactive map of Daram
- Location within the Philippines
- Coordinates: 11°38′03″N 124°47′41″E
- Country: Philippines
- Region: Eastern Visayas
- Province: Samar
- District: 2nd district
- Barangays: 58 (see Barangays)

Government
  - Type: Sangguniang Bayan
  - Mayor: Philip Martin L. Astorga
  - Vice Mayor: Lucia L. Astorga
  - Representative: Reynolds Michael Tan
  - Councilors: List: • Benjamin S. Amistoso; • Reynaldo M. Dacallos; • Reynaldo S. Tan; • Florentino P. Carcellar; • Vance Xavier V. Danday; • Jhoan N. Astorga; • Lee B. Allego; • Elisa G. Barrantes; DILG Masterlist of Officials
  - Electorate: 29,283 voters (2025)

Area
  - Total: 140.26 km^{2} (54.15 sq mi)
- Elevation: 24 m (79 ft)
- Highest elevation: 1,286 m (4,219 ft)
- Lowest elevation: 0 m (0 ft)

Population (2024 census)
  - Total: 41,932
  - Density: 298.96/km^{2} (774.30/sq mi)
  - Households: 9,252

Economy
  - Income class: 2nd municipal income class
  - Poverty incidence: 38.09% (2023)
  - Revenue: ₱ 191.2 million (2024)
  - Assets: ₱ 573.2 million (2024)
  - Expenditure: ₱ 226 million (2024)
  - Liabilities: ₱ 88.48 million (2024)

Service provider
  - Electricity: Samar 2 Electric Cooperative (SAMELCO 2)
- Time zone: UTC+8 (PST)
- ZIP code: 6722
- PSGC: 0806006000
- IDD : area code: +63 (0)55
- Native languages: Waray; Tagalog

Daram, officially the Municipality of Daram (Waray: Bungto han Daram; Tagalog: Bayan ng Daram), is a municipality in the province of Samar, Philippines. According to the 2024 census, it has a population of 41,932 people.

== Etymology ==
The origin of the name Daram is from a type of bird, called Darangsiyao, that guided the initial settlers to the island. Some time later, a Spaniard inquiring about the name of the island, mistook the name for "Daramsiyao". This was further shortened to the current name of Daram. The original name of Daramsiyao is still in use as the name of the annual festival held in Poblacion 1 on January 15.

== History ==
The Island was originally part of the municipality of Zumarraga, Samar, and mostly inhabited by a few fisher-folk and travelers from other places whose primary source of income was fishing and farming.

As the years passed Daram began to grow in population and economic activities through settlers and travelers who constructed dwelling units sporadically along the coastlines of the islands.

=== Separation from Zumarraga ===
On 1 September 1949, President Elpidio Quirino signed Executive Order No. 262. This order ceded the islands of Daram and Parasan from the Municipality of Zumarraga and created the independent Municipality of Daram, with barrio (now barangay) Daram as the municipal seat. On the current list of barangay for the Municipality of Daram, there is no barangay named Daram.

== Geography ==
Daram has a total land area of 14,026 hectares (34,659 acres). The town is composed of two major islands; Daram Island and Parasan Island. Other islands include Poro Island and Danaodanauan Island (uninhabited).

The main island features mountainous interiors with very narrow coastal areas. Mountain ranges occupy the major portion of the island municipality.

Daram has a combination of warm and cool climatic zones, thus the prevailing climate is ideal for the cultivation of a wide range of agricultural crops. There is no distinct dry season but the heavy wet season generally occurs in December.

Daram lies within the western part of Samar Sea and the Zumarraga Channel. The north and western boundary is the Samar Sea; the eastern boundary is the Zumarraga Channel; the southern boundary is Daram Channel.

It can be reached by a 30-minute boat ride from the provincial capital, Catbalogan, and Northern Leyte.

=== Barangays ===
Daram is politically subdivided into 58 barangays. Each barangay consists of puroks and some have sitios.

- Poblacion 1 (Hilaba)
- Poblacion 2 (Malingon)
- Poblacion 3 (Canti-il)
- Arawane
- Astorga
- Bachao
- Baclayan
- Bagacay
- Bayog
- Betaug
- Birawan
- Bono-anon
- Buenavista
- Burgos which is becoming popular with tourists
- Cabac
- Cabil-isan
- Cabiton-an
- Cabugao, (Parasan Island)
- Cagboboto, (Parasan Island)
- Calawan-an
- Cambuhay
- Candugue
- Campelipa
- Canloloy
- Cansaganay
- Casab-ahan, (Parasan Island)
- Guindapunan
- Guintampilan
- Iquiran
- Jacopon
- Losa
- Lucob-lucob
- Mabini
- Macalpe
- Mandoyucan
- Marupangdan
- Mayabay
- Mongolbongol
- Nipa
- Parasan, (Parasan Island)
- Pondang
- Poso
- Real
- Rizal, (Parasan Island)
- San Antonio
- San Jose
- San Miguel
- San Roque
- San Vicente
- Saugan
- So-ong
- Sua
- Sugod
- Talisay
- Tugas
- Ubo
- Valles-Bello
- Yangta

=== Climate ===
Climate data for Daram, Samar
Month	Jan	Feb	Mar	Apr	May	Jun	Jul	Aug	Sep	Oct	Nov	Dec	Year
Mean daily maximum °C (°F)	27 (81)	28 (82)	28 (82)	30 (86)	30 (86)	30 (86)	29 (84)	29 (84)	29 (84)	29 (84)	28 (82)	28 (82)	29 (84)
Mean daily minimum °C (°F)	22 (72)	22 (72)	22 (72)	23 (73)	24 (75)	24 (75)	24 (75)	24 (75)	24 (75)	24 (75)	23 (73)	23 (73)	23 (74)
Average precipitation mm (inches)	114 (4.5)	81 (3.2)	94 (3.7)	81 (3.2)	119 (4.7)	192 (7.6)	186 (7.3)	158 (6.2)	167 (6.6)	185 (7.3)	202 (8.0)	176 (6.9)	1,755 (69.2)
Average rainy days	18.6	14.7	16.8	17.8	22.3	25.9	27.5	26.2	26.6	27.0	24.6	22.3	270.3
Source: Meteoblue (modeled/calculated data, not measured locally)

== Demographics ==
Population census of Daram
Year	Pop.	±% p.a.
1960	25,423	—
1970	28,451	+1.13%
1975	29,893	+1.00%
1980	30,821	+0.61%
1990	31,332	+0.16%
1995	33,745	+1.40%
2000	35,532	+1.11%
2007	38,411	+1.08%
2010	41,322	+2.69%
2015	42,879	+0.71%
2020	41,608	−0.63%
2024	41,932	+0.19%
Source: Philippine Statistics Authority

=== Language ===
The native language of the majority in Daram is Samarnon-Waray-Waray (also known as Waraynon, Samarnon, or Samar-Leyte Visayan) and to a lesser degree Cebuano, both Visayan languages. Majority of the residents also speak and understand Tagalog and English.

=== Religion ===
Most of the inhabitants of Daram are Roman Catholics and a small number of born again. Because of the large number of Catholics, like other places in Philippines, they also celebrate fiesta (festival).

== Economy ==
Poverty incidence of Daram (%)

Source: Philippine Statistics Authority

Being an island municipality, the main livelihood is fishing and agriculture. Seafood is a local specialty, in fact, many fish are sold in the markets of nearby Catbalogan and Tacloban.

The major fishing products caught in the seas around Daram are galonggong, alumahan, tamban, pompano, bisugo (bream), lapu-lapu, rabbitfish, slipmouth and assorted. Other fish resources are seaweed, mussels/oysters, crabs and shells.

Kelp seaweed is also a major harvest and exported worldwide.

Agricultural income is derived mostly from coconuts, bananas, corn and other crops such as sweet potato, cassava, and legumes.

Recently, there is a surge in tourism activity in Daram with the rise in popularity of Kandiwata islet, a rock formation that has become a popular tourist destination. Nearby Monbon beach is also a popular recreation site for beach campers and overnight stay for Kandiwata tourists.

== Government ==
Like all other municipalities in the Philippines, Daram is governed from the Municipal Hall by a Mayor and the Sangguniang Panlungsod which is composed of the city (municipality) Vice Mayor as Presiding Officer, regular Sanggunian members (Councilors), the President of the Daram Chapter of the League of Barangays of the Philippines and the President of the Daram Chapter of the Sangguniang Kabataan (Student Leaders). These elected officials are entitled to three-year terms.

These political leaders exercise and perform the legislative powers and duties as provided for under Republic Act No. 7160, otherwise known as the Local Government Code of 1991. They are empowered to consider and conduct thorough study all matters brought to their attention and consequently pass resolutions, enact ordinances and introduce recommendations.

In 2010, it has a budgetary allocation of PHP 19.8 million from the Philippine government.

=== Elected officials (2016-2019) ===
Mayor

- Philip Astorga (Nationalist People's Coalition)

Vice mayor

- Lucia Astorga (Nationalist People's Coalition)

Municipal councilors

- Ben Amistoso (Nationalist People's Coalition)
- Boboy Dacallos (Nationalist People's Coalition)
- Jimmy Barrantes (Nationalist People's Coalition)
- Edgar Danday (Nationalist People's Coalition)
- Florentino Carcellar Jr. (Nationalist People's Coalition)
- Joan Astorga (Independent)
- Reden Lepasana (Nationalist People's Coalition)
- Danedave Cariño (Nationalist People's Coalition)

=== Elected officials (2013-2016) ===
Mayor

- Lo Astorga (Liberal Party)

Vice mayor

- Ben Amistoso (Independent)

Municipal councilors

- Boboy Dacallos (Nationalist People's Coalition)
- Henry Astorga (Independent)
- Buddy Astorga (Nationalist People's Coalition)
- Jimmy Barrantes (Independent)
- Reden Lepasana (Nationalist People's Coalition)
- Danilo Carino (Independent)
- Edgar Danday Sr. (Independent)
- Baby Carcellar (Independent)

=== Elected officials (2010-2013) ===
Mayor

- Lucia Latorre Astorga

Vice mayor

- Arthur Zamora Losa

Municipal councilors

- Benjamin Sauro Amistoso
- Florentino Paragas Carcellar Jr.
- Ronnie Quitalig Casiano
- Jimmy Achaso Barrantes
- Henry Verzosa Astorga
- Dante Bulan Gososo
- Danilo Pajares Cariño
- Edgar Redaja Danday Sr.

== Infrastructure ==
Daram offers limited urban and extensive basic rural infrastructure that includes water-based transportation, a plentiful public water supply, electrical supply from SAMELCO II, cellular and cable communication facilities, sports and recreational facilities, tourist spots, and common service establishments.

== Education ==
=== Primary schools ===
Daram has 58 primary schools.

- Arawane ES
- Astorga ES
- Baclayan ES
- Bagacay ES
- Bakhaw ES
- Bayog PS
- Bita-Ug PS
- Buenavista ES
- Buno-Anon PS
- Burgos ES
- Cabac PS
- Cabil-Isan PS
- Cabiton-An ES
- Cabugao PS
- Cagboboto PS
- Cagutsan PS
- Calawan-An ES
- Cambuhay PS
- Campelipa PS
- Candugue ES
- Canloloy PS
- Cansaganay PS
- Casab-Ahan ES
- Daram CS
- Daram II CS (Birawan CS)
- Guintampilan PS
- Guintampilan PS
- Iquiran PS
- Jacopon PS
- Losa ES
- Lucob-Lucob PS
- Mabini PS
- Macalpe PS
- Man-ngere PS
- Mandoyucan ES
- Marupangdan ES
- Mayabay ES
- MongolBongol ES
- Nipa ES
- Parasan ES
- Pondang ES
- Poso ES
- Real PS
- Rizal ES
- San Antonio PS
- San Jose ES
- San Miguel PS
- San Roque ES
- San Vicente PS
- Saugan ES
- So-Ong PS
- Sua ES
- Sugod PS
- Talisay PS
- Tugas ES
- Ubo ES
- Valles-Bello ES
- Yangta PS

=== Secondary schools ===
Daram has 8 secondary schools.

- Bagacay NHS
- Bakhaw NHS
- Birawan NHS
- Cabiton-an Integrated School
- Daram NHS
- Parasan NHS
- Rizal Integrated School
- Sua NHS
