= Hari sa Hari, Lahi sa Lahi =

- Directed by: Eddie Romero; Hsiao Lang; Lili Chou
- Written by: Yan Jianping; Su Shuyang; Eddie Romero
- Produced by: Hu Qiming; Garcia
- Starring: Vic Vargas; Wang Hsing Gang
- Cinematography: Ru Shuiren; Manolo Abaya
- Edited by: Yang Zongqi
- Music by: Wang Liping; Ryan Cayabyab
- Production companies: Cultural Center of the Philippines; Chinese Films
- Distributed by: Toho (Japan); Ustredni pujcovna filmu (Czechoslovakia); Regal Films (Philippines)
- Release dates: August 14, 1987 (Manila Film Center); August 21, 1987 (Philippines)
- Running time: 150 minutes
- Countries: Philippines; China
- Languages: Filipino; Chinese

Hari sa Hari, Lahi sa Lahi (Chinese: 苏禄国王与中国皇帝; English: The King of Sulu and the Emperor of China) is a 1987 Filipino-Chinese epic historical drama film directed by Eddie Romero, Hsiao Lang, and Lili Chou, and starring Vic Vargas and Wang Hsing Gang. Set in the early 15th century, the film is about the meeting between the East King of Sulu, Paduka Pahala, and the Emperor of the Ming Dynasty, Zhu Di.

== Cast ==
- Vic Vargas as Paduka Pahala
- Wang Hsing Gang as Zhu Di
- Dan Alvaro
- Rosemarie Sonora as Gemuning
- Tanya Gomez
- Isabel Rivas
- Liu Chun as Ji Gang
- Chang Jie as Zheng He
- Alan Bautista as Ismael, eldest son of Paduka Pahala
- Ruben Rustia
- Chou Jie as Lu Lan
- Nestor Torre Jr.
- Joonee Gamboa
- Shamaine Centenera

== Production ==
The film was shot in China over the latter half of 1986. It was initially titled King and Emperor, and was originally slated for release in January 1987.

== Release ==
Hari sa Hari, Lahi sa Lahi was given a "G" rating by the Movie and Television Review and Classification Board (MTRCB). The film had its world premiere at the Tanghalang Gerardo de Leon of the Manila Film Center on August 14, 1987, and received its wide release in the Philippines on August 21.
