= Wang Xingang =

Chinese actor

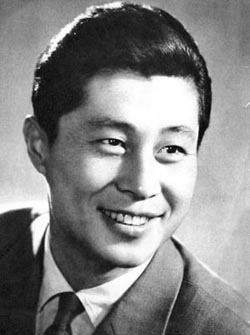
- Wang Xingang before 1961.
- Born: 1 January 1932 (age 93); Dalian, Liaoning, China
- Occupation: actor
- Years active: 1956～present
- Spouse: Yang Shaocai (m. 1961)
- Children: 2
- Awards: Golden Rooster Awards – Lifetime Achievement Award; 2014 Hundred Flowers Awards – Best Actor; 1982 Zhi Yin

Chinese name
- Traditional Chinese: 王心剛
- Simplified Chinese: 王心刚
Transcriptions

Wang Xingang (born 1 January 1932), is a Chinese actor. In 2014, he honored Golden Rooster Award for Lifetime Achievement Award.

== Selected filmography ==
Year	Title	Role	Notes
1956	Silent Woods	Feng Guangfa	
1957	The Son of Herdsmen	Deli Geer	
1958	The Eternal Wave	Yao Wei	
1959	Sea Hawk	Zhang Min	
1960	Meng Long Sha	Jiang Hong	
1961	Red Detachment of Women	Hong Changqing	
1963	Struggles in an Ancient City	Yang Xiaodong	
1965	Secret Eagle	Chen Liang	
1974	Scout	Guo Rui	
1976	Great Wall on the South-China Sea	Qu Yingcai	
1978	The Great River Flows On	Qin Yunfei	
1979	End of the World Green Sea	Nan Lin	
1981	Grieve Over the Deceased	Juan Sheng	
1982	Zhi Yin	Juan Sheng	Hundred Flowers Award for Best Actor
1987	Hari sa Hari, Lahi sa Lahi	Zhu Di	
