= Dan Alvaro =

Filipino actor (born 1951)

Dan Alvaro (born Rolando Galura; 1951) is a Filipino actor both in movies and television. His niece is actress Glaiza de Castro and his nephew is actor Alcris Galura. He is the father of actor Ram Alvaro.

== Career ==
In 1984, Alvaro played as the brother of Nora Aunor in the film Condemned who works as a driver and hired hit man for ruthless money laundering lady played by Gloria Romero. He received a nominations for PMPC Star Awards for Movies for New Male Movie Star of the Year and Movie Actor of the Year in the movie Condemned. In 1986, he launched to action stardom in the movie Bagong Hari, which he received also a nominee for Best Actor Gawad Urian Award, directed by Mario O'Hara under Cine Suerte productions. He played the title role in supernatural hero film Alamid (Ang Alamat) as the younger Alamid (with Lito Lapid as the elder Alamid).

== Filmography ==
=== Film ===
Title	Year	Ref.
Mad Warrior	1984	
Chicas	1984	
Condemned	1984	
Burning Power	1985	
Caliber 357	1985	
Bagong Hari	1986	
Matatalim Na Pangil sa Gubat	1986	
Tatlong Ina, Isang Anak	1987	
Hari sa Hari, Lahi sa Lahi	1987	
Takot Ako, Eh!	1987	
Bawat Patak Dugong Pilipino	1989	
May Araw Ka Rin Bagallon	1990	
Andrea, Paano Ba ang Maging Isang Ina?	1990	
Aguinaldo	1993	
Lab Kita... Bilib Ka Ba?	1994	
Kahit Harangan ng Bala	1995	
Junior Police	1995	
Bunso: Isinilang Kang Palaban!	1995	
Nagmula sa Lupa	1996	
Kristo	1996	
Pusakal	1997	
Tawagin Mo ang Lahat ng Santo	1997	
Alamid: Ang Alamat	1998	
Ako ang Lalagot sa Hininga Mo	1999	
Siquijor: Mystic Island	2007	
Foster Child	2007	
Anak ng Kumander	2008	
Service	2008	
Tarima	2010	
Ishmael	2010	
Si Agimat at si Enteng Kabisote	2010	
Ang Lihim ni Adonis	2011	
Corazon: Ang Unang Aswang	2012	
Ken at Abel	2012	
The Blood	2017	
Psycho	2019	
Nelia	2021	
Agila ng Silangan	2023	
Matang Pusa	TBA	
Heneral Bantag: Anak ng Cordillera	TBA	

=== Television ===
Year	Title	Role	Ref(s):
1988	357 Kamagong		
2001	Sa Dulo ng Walang Hanggan	Lawin	
2005	Panday		
2011	Amaya		
2013	Indio		
2013	Batang Lagalag (television film)		
2015	Wish Ko Lang		
2015	Buena Familia	Kenneth Vasquez	
2015	Alisto!		
2015	Imbestigador		
2015	Maynila		
2015	Karelasyon		
2015	FPJ's Ang Probinsyano		
2024	FPJ's Batang Quiapo	Dante Mariano	
