= Golden Rooster Award for Lifetime Achievement =

Chinese film award

The Lifetime Achievement Award is a Golden Rooster Award that has been given since 2005 for an achievement that has made an outstanding contribution to cinema. There is no annual award category. From 2005, the Golden Rooster Awards and Hundred Flowers Awards take place on alternate years, but the Golden Rooster Award for Lifetime Achievement Award is still made annually.

== Results ==
This table displays the individuals who received the Lifetime Achievement Award for their contributions to film.

Year	Recipient(s)	Notes
2025	Qiao Zhen; Xiao Guiyun	Voice actor Director
2024	Xu Guangyao; Xie Fei	Writer; Director
2023	Shichang Da 达式常	Film actor
2012	Wang Weiyi 王为一; Yan Jizhou 严寄洲	Director; Director
2011	Xiang Junshu 向隽殊; Fu Zhengyi 傅正义	Voice Actor; Editor
2010	Yu Yang 于洋; Tian Hua 田华	Male Actor & Director; Female Actor
2009	Yu Lan 于蓝; Qin Yi 秦怡	Female Actor; Female Actor
2008	Chen Qiang 陈强; Zhang Jian 张鉴; Yuan Naichen 袁乃晨	Male Actor; Writer; Translator
2007	Zhang Ruifang 张瑞芳; Lu Zhuguo 陆柱国	Female Actor; Writer
2005	Xie Jin 谢晋; Xie Tieli 谢铁骊	Director & Writer; Director & Writer
2004	Tang Xiaodan	Director
