= Lucio and Simplicio Godino =

Filipino conjoined twins

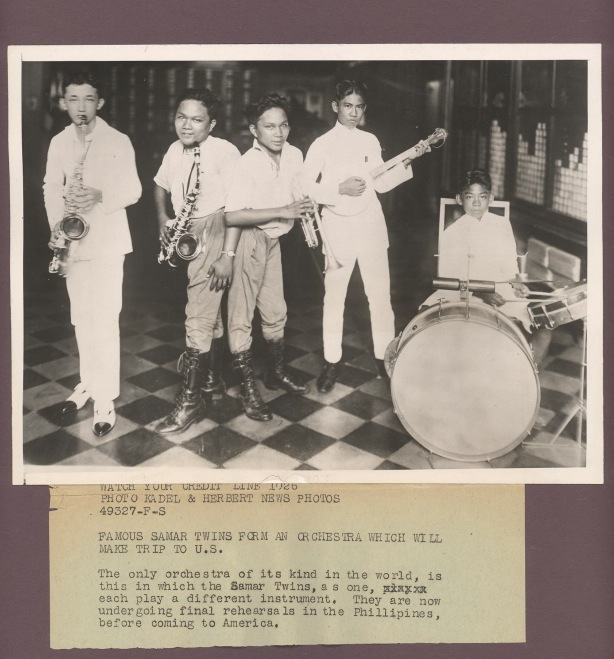
- Born: March 8, 1908; Samar, Philippines
- Died: Lucio: 24 November 1936 (aged 28); Simplicio: 8 December 1936 (aged 28); New York City, U.S.
- Spouse(s): Lucio: Natividad Matos; Simplicio: Victorina Matos (Natividad and Victorina Matos were identical twin sisters)

Lucio Godino (March 8, 1908 – November 24, 1936) and Simplicio Godino (March 8, 1908 – December 8, 1936) were pygopagus conjoined twins from the island of Samar in the Philippines.

In 1929, at the age of 21, they married Natividad and Victorina Matos, who were identical twins. They would later perform in various sideshow acts, including in an orchestra on Coney Island and in dance with their wives.

The twins were also gifted a motor car by their foster father, which was later involved in a motor vehicle accident in September 1929. The Morning Avalanche reported that Lucio Godino was driving at high speed when their vehicle struck a carabao cart, injuring its driver. Both twins were arrested and subsequently sentenced by a judge to five days' imprisonment for reckless and drunk driving. However, Simplicio appealed the case, arguing that imprisoning Lucio would also mean incarcerating him, despite his innocence. The appeal was reportedly successful, and the twins were released in October 1929.

After Lucio died of rheumatic fever in New York City, doctors operated to separate him from Simplicio. Simplicio survived the operation, but died shortly thereafter due to spinal meningitis.
