= Banta ng Kahapon =

- Theatrical release poster
- Directed by: Eddie Romero
- Screenplay by: Eddie Romero
- Story by: Eddie Romero
- Produced by: Antonio Co
- Starring: Vic Vargas; Rafael Roco, Jr.; Roland Dantes; Chanda Romero
- Cinematography: Justo Paulino
- Edited by: Ben Barcelon
- Music by: Vic Santiago; Berg Villapando; Marilyn Villapando
- Production company: Hemisphere Pictures
- Release date: December 24, 1977
- Country: Philippines
- Language: Filipino

Banta ng Kahapon (transl. Threat of Yesterday) is a 1977 Philippine action film directed by Eddie Romero and starring Vic Vargas, Rafael Roco Jr., Roland Dantes, and Chanda Romero.

Set during the 1969 Philippine House of Representatives elections, it follows the motive of "guns, goons, and gold."

== Cast ==
- Vic Vargas
- Rafael Roco Jr.
- Roland Dantes
- Chanda Romero
- Lito Legaspi
- John Soberano
- Roderick Paulate
- Ruben Rustia
- Karim Kiram
- Romero Rivera
- Henry Salcedo
- Oliva O'Hara
- Celita DeCastro

== Reception ==
The film won the 1978 Gawad Urian Award for "Best Editing" by Ben Barcelon. It was also nominated in those awards for Best Picture, Best Director, and Best Screenplay of 1978. It was an official entry in the 1977 Metro Manila Film Festival.

In 2004, the Philippines government film office lauded the movie as "Another Eddie Romero masterpiece" that closed the annual retrospective of classic films.

When Romero died in 2013, the TV network ABS-CBN cited the film as one of his four most important films.

=== Accolades ===
Year	Award-giving body	Category	Recipient	Result
1978	Gawad Urian Awards			
1978	Gawad Urian Awards	Best Editing (Pinakamahusay na Editing)	Ben Barcelon	Won
1978	Gawad Urian Awards	Best Picture (Pinakamahusay na Pelikula)	Banta ng Kahapon	Nominated
1978	Gawad Urian Awards	Best Direction (Pinakamahusay na Direksyon)	Eddie Romero	Nominated
1978	Gawad Urian Awards	Best Screenplay (Pinakamahusay na Dulang Pampelikula)	Eddie Romero	Nominated
