= Paduka Pahala =

East King of Sulu (d. 1417) buried in China

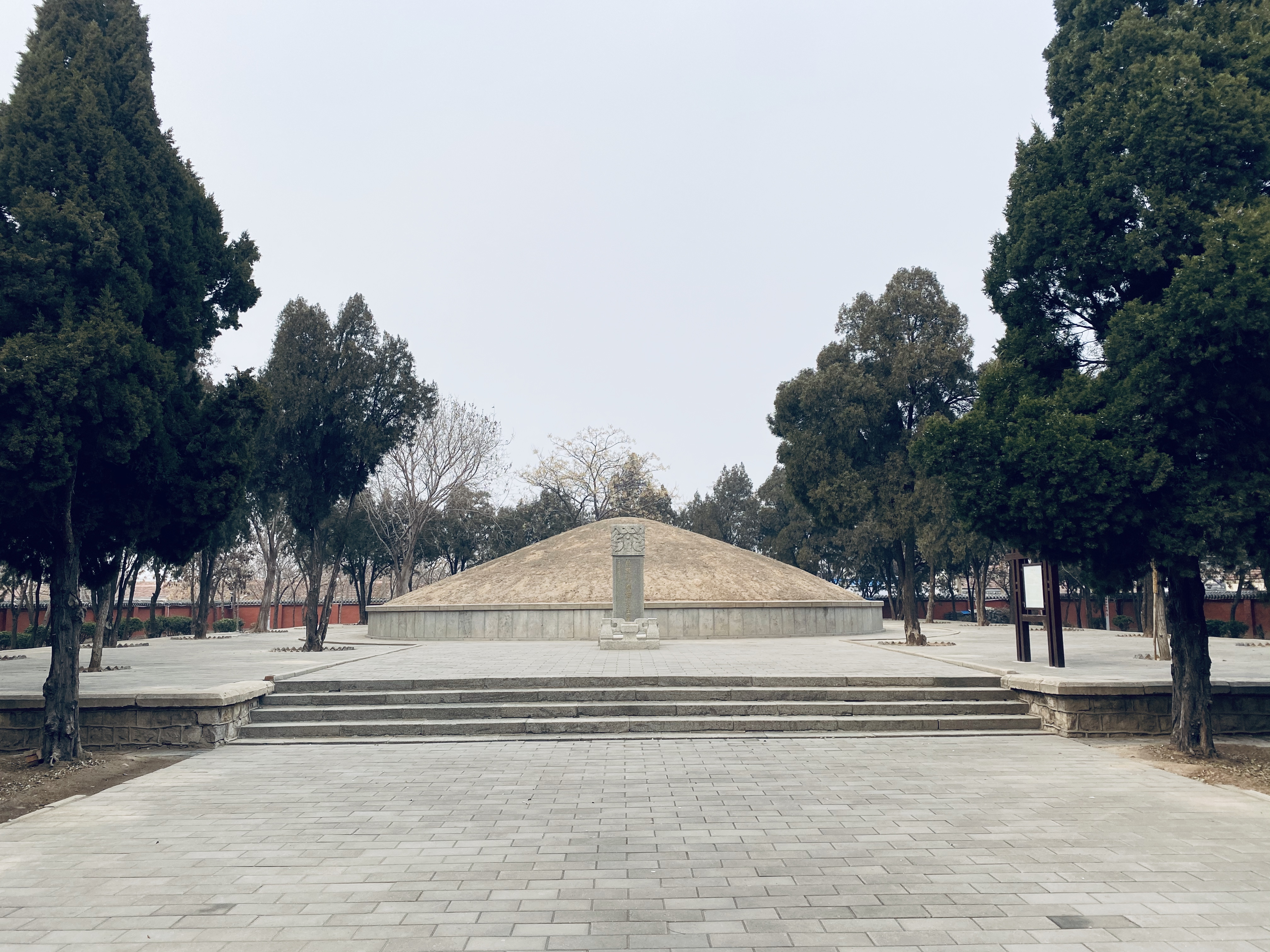
- Tomb of Paduka Pahala near Dezhou

East King of Sulu
- Reign: ? – 1417
- Successor: Tumahan
- Died: 23 October 1417; Dezhou
- Burial: 20 November 1417; Decheng, Dezhou
- Spouse: Kamulin
- Issue: Tumahan, Antulu, Wenhala

Paduka Pahala (Note: Also known as Paduka Batara. Pāduka and Bhaṭṭāra are not names but Sanskrit titles associated with nobility.) (Chinese: 巴都葛·叭哈喇; died 23 October 1417) was a precolonial king from the Sulu Archipelago in today's Philippines, where he ruled as East King of Sulu. He is best known as the first king from the region to be buried in China, where he died during a journey to visit the Ming emperor. The impact of his death and burial was pivotal to China–Philippines relations. His tomb in Dezhou is still maintained by his descendants and includes a museum.

== Voyage to China ==
In September 1417, according to the Ming Veritable Records, Paduka Pahala sailed from Sulu with over 340 other people, including his family, to pay tribute to Zhu Di, the Yongle Emperor of the Chinese Ming dynasty. Pahala was accompanied by two other kings of Sulu, but he was considered superior to both of them. He was ceremoniously welcomed by the emperor upon his arrival in Beijing, staying in the court for 27 days.

The king's tribute included pearls and precious stones; in return, the chieftains were recognized as rulers of their respective kingdoms and received a number of gifts, including money, gold, silver, plain silk, and three richly detailed robes.

On his return journey down the Grand Canal, he contracted a mysterious disease described as "autumn fever". He was taken to the imperial hall in Dezhou in Shandong province, where he died on 23 October. The emperor, moved by grief, commissioned artisans and sculptors to build a tomb for the deceased monarch, which was completed a month later, granting him the posthumous name of Gōng Dìng (translated as "Reverent and Steadfast"). (Note: Chinese: 恭定)

== Legacy ==
=== Descendants in China ===
After his Pahala's death, his eldest son Tumahan (Chinese: 子都马舍; some associate him with Rajah Baguinda) returned to Sulu to assume the throne. The late king's widow, concubines, and 18 attendants from Sulu stayed in China to observe a three-year mourning period and to care for the king's tomb.

Most of the entourage left China after the mourning period, being escorted by a Chinese high commissioner back to Sulu, with the exception of the king's second and third sons, respectively Antulu and Wenhala. The dowager queen returned to visit her relatives in China in 1423, migrating there permanently the year after. The king's sons were later buried alongside their parents.

The descendants of Antulu and Wenhala remained in China, converted to Islam while in Shandong, and intermarried with members of the Hui nationality of the area, adopting the surnames An (Chinese: 安) and Wen (Chinese: 温). They were estimated to number at around 3700 in China in the late 2010s.

=== Tomb in Dezhou ===
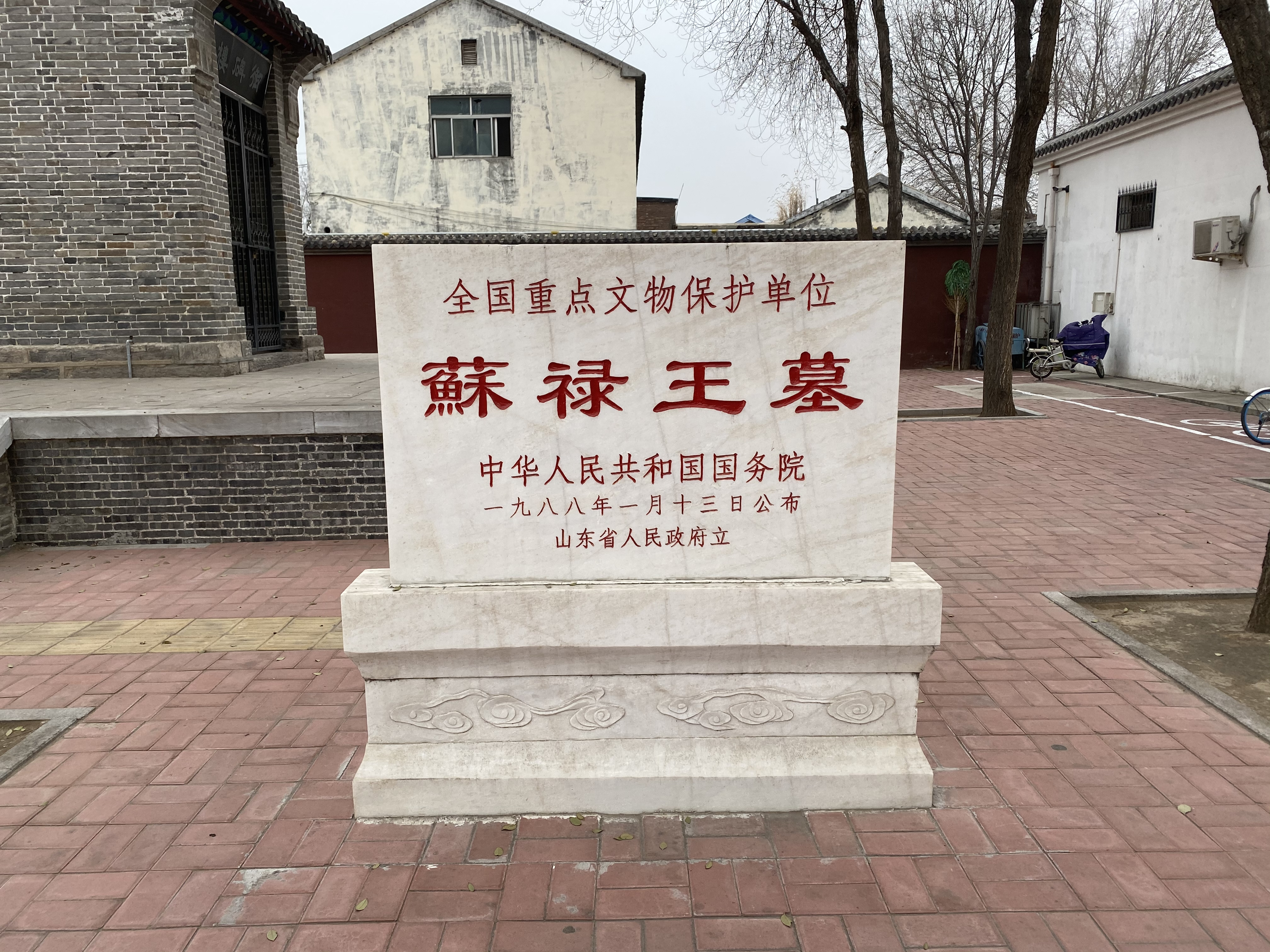
Stone marker at the entrance to the Tomb of the Sulu King (苏禄王墓).

The tomb and monument to the Sulu king still stands today, covering an area of over 80 acres about 1 km north of Dezhou. It was renovated after 1980, and in 1988 it became a national priority protected site. The monument features stone men, horses, sheep, and leopards. The museum inside the complex became a national second-class museum in 2024.

The Yongle Emperor's memorial epitaph, inscribed in 1418, reads:

Now then, the King, brilliant and sagacious, gentle and honest, especially outstanding and naturally talented, as a sincere act of true respect for the Way of Heaven, did not shrink from a voyage of many tens of thousands of miles to lead his familial household in person, together with his tribute officers and fellow countrymen, to cross the sea routes in a praiseworthy spirit of loyal obedience.

=== Influence on China–Philippines relations ===
The friendly gesture of the Ming emperor to the Sulu travelers led to a series of exchange missions between China and nations in the Philippine islands starting in 1420, including the migration of Chinese traders from Fujian to Sulu and nearby regions. The most well-received mission was led from Mindanao in 1421 by the late king's brother Paduka Suli, having gifted a seven-liang (about 220 grams) pearl to the emperor and remaining in the court for two years with his nephews.

In June 1733, the reigning sultan of Sulu Badaruddin I sent an envoy to the Yongzheng Emperor to express his gratitude for the treatment the Chinese emperor had given his ancestor, requesting for Pahala's tomb to be repaired and for any living descendants to be bestowed with pensions. The emperor granted the sultan's request and elected representatives to take charge of the sacrificial rites for the king's descendants.

As part of the 30th anniversary of the establishment of diplomatic relations between China and the Philippines, 17th and 18th generation descendants of Paduka Pahala from Shandong visited Sulu in 2005, marking the first time the king's Chinese descendants had returned to the Philippines.

A descendant of the Sulu royal family, Phugdalun Kiram II, was invited to Dezhou in 2017 to attend the 600th anniversary of Paduka Pahala's death. The event culminated in a speech by General Secretary of the Chinese Communist Party Xi Jinping recognizing the importance of a treaty signed in 1405 that established Sulu as a tributary state to China.

=== Cultural depictions ===
The 1987 Filipino-Chinese film Hari sa Hari, Lahi sa Lahi recounts Paduka Pahala's voyage to China.

== See also ==
- Lupah Sug
- List of sultans of Sulu
- China–Philippines relations
