= Zumarraga, Samar =

Municipality in Samar, Philippines

Zumarraga
- Municipality
- Municipality of Zumarraga
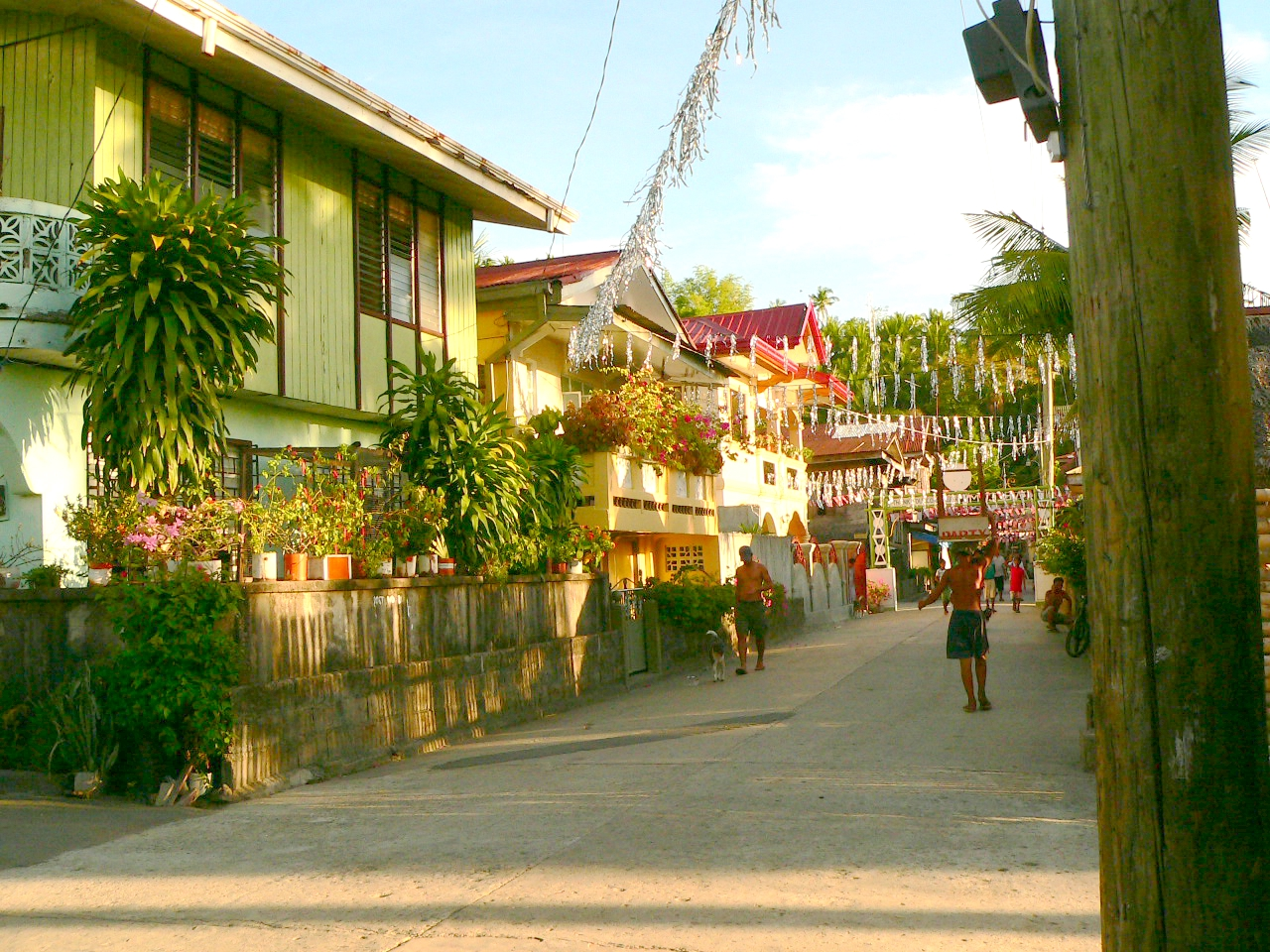
- Downtown area

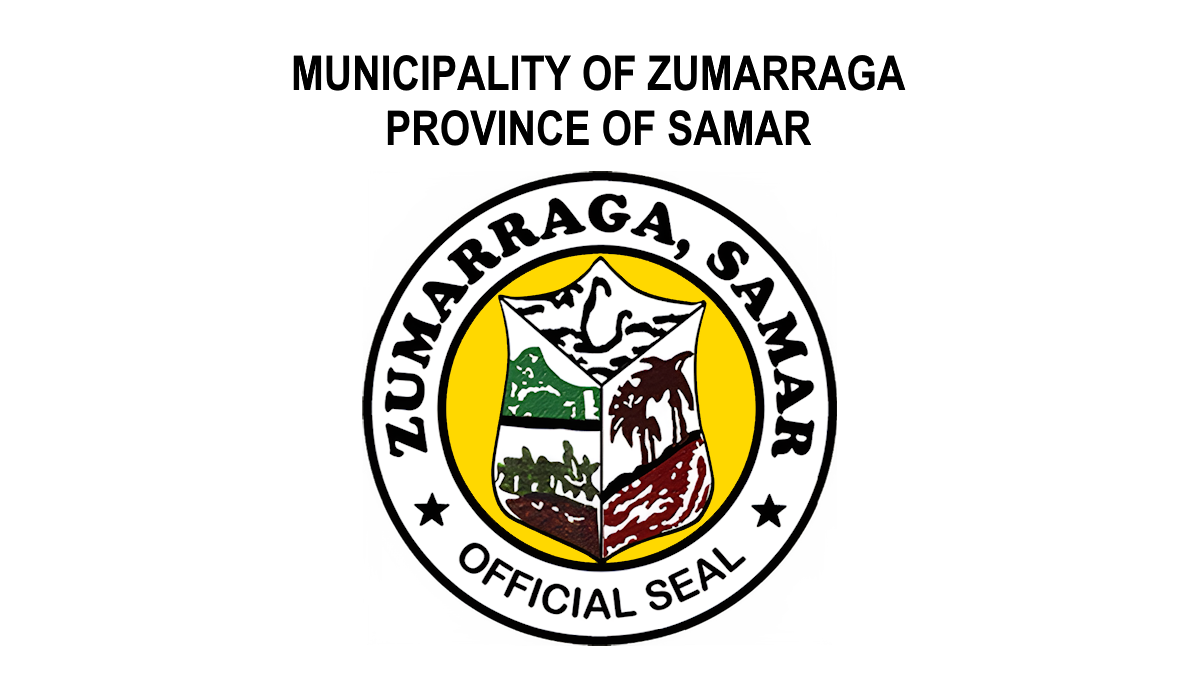
- Flag

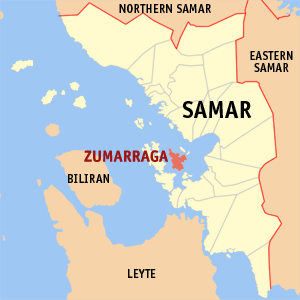
- Map of Samar with Zumarraga highlighted
- Interactive map of Zumarraga
- Location within the Philippines
- Coordinates: 11°38′20″N 124°50′28″E
- Country: Philippines
- Region: Eastern Visayas
- Province: Samar
- District: 2nd district
- Named for: Zumarraga, Spain
- Barangays: 25 (see Barangays)

Government
  - Type: Sangguniang Bayan
  - Mayor: Rosalito R. Castillo
  - Vice Mayor: Arnel A. Lubao
  - Representative: Reynolds Michael Tan
  - Electorate: 13,509 voters (2025)

Area
  - Total: 38.55 km^{2} (14.88 sq mi)
- Elevation: 17 m (56 ft)
- Highest elevation: 348 m (1,142 ft)
- Lowest elevation: 0 m (0 ft)

Population (2024 census)
  - Total: 16,051
  - Density: 416.4/km^{2} (1,078/sq mi)
  - Households: 3,606
- Demonym: Zumaragahnon

Economy
  - Income class: 4th municipal income class
  - Poverty incidence: 36.52% (2023)
  - Revenue: ₱ 109.9 million (2024)
  - Assets: ₱ 202 million (2024)
  - Expenditure: ₱ 104.6 million (2024)
  - Liabilities: ₱ 42.26 million (2024)

Service provider
  - Electricity: Samar 2 Electric Cooperative (SAMELCO 2)
- Time zone: UTC+8 (PST)
- ZIP code: 6725
- PSGC: 0806023000
- IDD : area code: +63 (0)55
- Native languages: Waray; Tagalog
- Patron saint: Anthony of Padua

Zumarraga, officially the Municipality of Zumarraga (Waray: Bungto han Zumarraga; Tagalog: Bayan ng Zumarraga), is an island municipality in the province of Samar, Philippines. According to the 2024 census, it has a population of 16,051 people.

It is formerly known as Buad, Rawis, and Kawayan. The town itself, notably its downtown area, is considered by many heritage scholars as a heritage zone due to the many heritage houses within its vicinity. The local government unit is currently conserving the history and traditions of the town.

The town is also famous for two alcoholic beverages: kinutil (tubâ or coconut wine with egg yolk) and dubado (tubâ with melted tablea).

== History ==
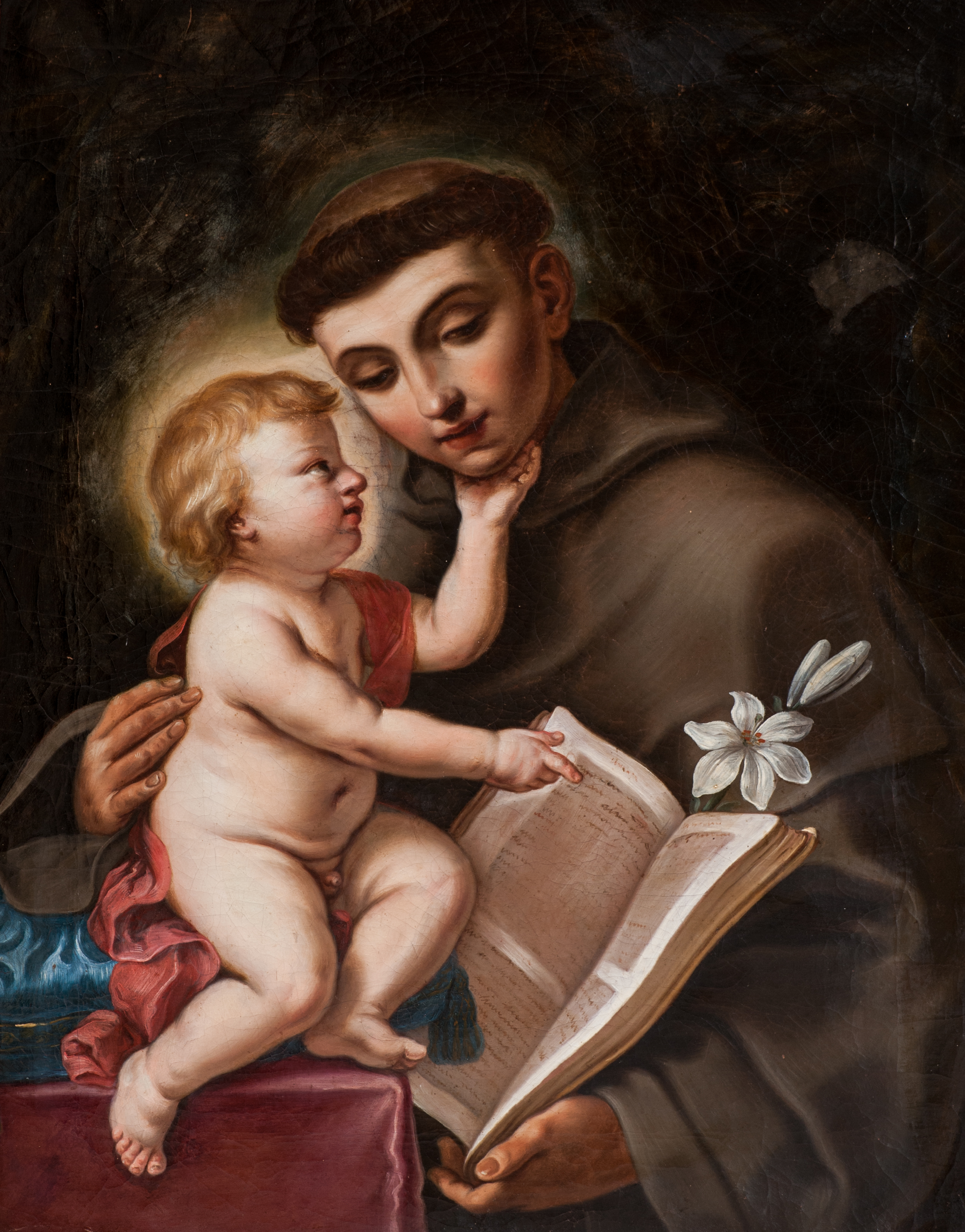
Anthony of Padua, Zumarraga's patron saint

The town of Zumarraga was known for years due its flourishing fishing industry. This began with a small fishing village of families who had sailed from Leyte. They discovered the island on a routine fishing trip, and sought safe harbour from a storm in the area now called Rawes. They found the place ideal for settlement, naturally pleasing due to the presence of bamboo, hence calling it “Kawayan” upon their return to.

These village became prosperous due to an abundance of fish in the surrounding waters, drawing people from neighbouring areas for business. The first to come were the Ferreras from Leyte.

News of this rich fishing village reached the Moro pirates so they extended their raids to Visayan waters. To keep themselves safe, natives built strong stone fortifications atop the hill overlooking the town, which are preserved by the people’s descendants.

The exact date of the Spanish arriving in Zumarraga is uncertain, but the earliest record is from 1848, when a Spanish friar was sent to the settlement. It was said how upon their coming, the Spaniards already found the natives under the laws of the autonomous body ruling the village. The name of the place was already "Buad", from the local term "Binuwaaran" (the digging made by wild pigs). The village was finally renamed “Zumarraga”, as the first Spanish curate, Rev. Fr. Martin Yepes, was born in Zumarraga, in the Basque Country of Spain.

On March 13, 1863, the town became an independent parroquia by virtue of royal decree of Queen Isabella II. On Oct. 12, 1865, it was confirmed the town was a parish under a certain diocese. The parish priest thus had jurisdiction over the islands of Buad and Daram, including Paranas.

With the coming of Spanish clergy came educational, spiritual and moral improvement for the locals. This attracted immigrant families from neighbouring towns, islands, and provinces, foremost being the Zetas from Palo, Leyte; the Astorgas from Barugo, Leyte; the Villaflors from Carigara, Leyte; the Dazas, Magas, and Narios from Catbalogan, Samar; as well as the Carcellars, Zosas, Versosas and Castillos.

A well-organised local government was established, its chief executive titled Capitán. The early capitanes, in the order of succession, were: Tenorio Ferrer (Capitán Toyang), Nepomuceno Zeta (Capitán Sinoy), Nicolás Custodio (Capitán Colas), Salvador Zeta (Capitán Badoy), Brígido Heal (Capitan Bido), Tomás Bello, Hilario Villaflor and Agustín Astorga. These officials were appointed by the Gobernadorcillo upon advice of the parish priest, who also served as the local Inspector. Much had happened during the Spanish era but no written records exist, and townsfolk rely on oral histories passed down through families.

When the United States took possession of the Philippines with a military government following the Spanish-American War, change also came on the local level. Free elections were introduced, and the local town executive was retitled Presidente. The presidentes, in the order of tenure, were: Mario Maga, 1910; Luis Villaflor, 1911; Lucio Mijares, 1913; Leodergario Carcellar, 1914; Enrique Nario, 1916; Benito Astorga, 1920; Enrique Nario, 1926; and Rodrigo Daza, 1931.

Population growth came mainly by immigration from neighboring places, driving an increase in industry and business, particularly in fishing. It was during this rapid development that the wharf and part of the breakwater were built. The most illustrious son of Zumarraga, the late Pedro R. Arteche, was the local delegate to the 1934 Philippine Constitutional Convention election; he subsequently occupied the gubernatorial seat for the provinces of Samar. During this period, the elected town executive was known as Mayor. Until the outbreak of the Second World War, these were: 1936-1938 Mayor Emilio Zeta, Vice-Mayor Leodegario Carcellar; 1939-Mayor Francisco Zosa, Vice Mayor Francisco Castillo.

The town was damaged in the war but the local government tried its best to reconstruct and improve public works. These include cementing streets, the establishment of the Puericculture Center, putting up electric lighting, a public market, and the construction of additional pre-fab, Marcos-Era and the Bagong Lipunan buildings. A private Catholic high school was established by few civic-spirited citizens, and duly recognised by the government, still serving Zumarraga and surrounding areas.

On September 1, 1949, President Elpidio Quirino signed Executive Order No. 262 to separate the islands of Daram and Parasan from Zumarraga to form part of the independent municipality of Daram.

The town’s centuries-old Catholic church is dedicated to its patron, Saint Anthony of Padua, and is now being reconstructed. Such project has been attributed to different priests, the Parish Council and the generosity of Zumaraganhons now residing in Manila, Cebu City, Iligan City, Tacloban City, Catbalogan, and Calbayog who have prospered in their own lines of profession and industry and through the collective efforts of all Zumaraganhons.

== Geography ==
=== Barangays ===
Zumarraga is divided into 25 barangays. Each barangay consists of puroks and some have sitios.

- Alegria
- Arado
- Arteche
- Bioso
- Boblaran
- Botaera
- Buntay
- Camayse
- Canwarak
- Ibarra
- Lumalantang
- Macalunod
- Maga-an
- Maputi
- Monbon
- Mualbual
- Pangdan
- Poro
- San Isidro
- Sugod
- Tinaugan
- Tubigan
- Poblacion 1 (Barangay 1)
- Poblacion 2 (Barangay 2)
- Marapilit
- Talib
- Igpit opol

=== Climate ===
Climate data for Zumarraga, Samar
Month	Jan	Feb	Mar	Apr	May	Jun	Jul	Aug	Sep	Oct	Nov	Dec	Year
Mean daily maximum °C (°F)	27 (81)	28 (82)	28 (82)	30 (86)	30 (86)	30 (86)	29 (84)	29 (84)	29 (84)	29 (84)	28 (82)	28 (82)	29 (84)
Mean daily minimum °C (°F)	22 (72)	22 (72)	22 (72)	23 (73)	24 (75)	24 (75)	24 (75)	24 (75)	24 (75)	24 (75)	23 (73)	23 (73)	23 (74)
Average precipitation mm (inches)	114 (4.5)	81 (3.2)	94 (3.7)	81 (3.2)	119 (4.7)	192 (7.6)	186 (7.3)	158 (6.2)	167 (6.6)	185 (7.3)	202 (8.0)	176 (6.9)	1,755 (69.2)
Average rainy days	18.6	14.7	16.8	17.8	22.3	25.9	27.5	26.2	26.6	27.0	24.6	22.3	270.3
Source: Meteoblue

== Demographics ==
Population census of Zumarraga
Year	Pop.	±% p.a.
1903	9,992	—
1918	11,068	+0.68%
1939	21,225	+3.15%
1948	30,593	+4.15%
1960	11,549	−7.80%
1970	12,064	+0.44%
1975	13,297	+1.97%
1980	12,821	−0.73%
1990	13,324	+0.39%
1995	14,505	+1.60%
2000	15,423	+1.32%
2007	16,743	+1.14%
2010	16,936	+0.42%
2015	16,295	−0.73%
2020	16,279	−0.02%
2024	16,051	−0.34%
Source: Philippine Statistics Authority

== Economy ==
Poverty incidence of Zumarraga (%)

Source: Philippine Statistics Authority
