= Vic Vargas =

Filipino film actor and judoka (1939-2003)

- Born: Jose Maria Marfori Asuncion; 28 March 1939; Philippines
- Died: 19 July 2003 (aged 64); Pasay, Philippines
- Occupations: Actor, judoka
- Years active: 1962–2002
- Spouse: Rosanna Zamora
- Children: Basilio Anton Asuncion

Jose Maria Marfori Asuncion (March 28, 1939 – July 19, 2003), better known by his stage name Vic Vargas, was a Filipino film actor and judoka. He was a three-time Philippine judo champion at 17. He starred in more than sixty films.

== Early life and career ==
Vic Vargas was born on March 28, 1939. When he was seventeen, Vargas won three championships for judo in the Philippines. He finished architecture (Note: Another source says that he took up a commerce course.) at the University of Santo Tomas and then afterwards, became a physical education instructor teaching martial arts at the University of the East.

Eventually, he reluctantly entered show business after being challenged by a friend, and then he debuted in the film Diegong Tabak in 1962. His early films also include pairing with Filipina actress Josephine Estrada particularly in the film Prinsipeng Tulisan made by VP Pictures, a subsidiary of Sampaguita Pictures, where he was one of its contract actor. Being an expert on judo, he became a judo instructor for a television program broadcast by Channel 7.

== Later career ==
He starred in more than sixty films from the early 1960s up to 2002. He was typecast in certain genres like action and sexy comedy due to his dark skin, figure, and sex appeal. In 1971, he got a role in Ismael Bernal's Pagdating sa Dulo, which was voted by Manunuri ng Pelikulang Pilipino as one of the best films of the 1970s. In the film El Vibora, he won his first Best Actor award given by the organizers of the 1972 Manila Film Festival. He won again as Best Actor the next year on the same festival for the film Nueva Vizcaya.

In the mid-1970s, he was an on and off-cam pair with 1969 Miss Universe Gloria Diaz. Their first film together was in Ang Pinakamagandang Hayop sa Balat ng Lupa, that started a wet-and-wild trend in Philippine cinema. The tandem also starred in the Andres de Saya film series. In the 1982 film In This Corner by Filipino director Lino Brocka, he got an Urian Best Actor nomination.

Aside from being a film actor, he also appeared on television, and he became one of the cast of the television show Lahi ni Adan and briefly hosted Tawag ng Tanghalan after the death of Lopito, the original male host of the show. He also appeared in the sitcom television show of ABS-CBN, Home Along Da Riles. Other notable films that he starred include Pito ang Asawa Ko, Sinong Kapiling, Sinong Kasiping?, Banta ng Kahapon and Hari sa Hari, Lahi sa Lahi (also known as The King and the Emperor).

He was also known for being one of the first actors who entered the Charismatic movement in the Philippines. He also became an environmentalist after becoming a member of the environmental group Bantay-Dagat in Palawan. One of his last films include portraying Rajah Humabon in the 2002 biopic film Lapu-Lapu, with Lito Lapid portraying the title character.

== Personal life ==
Vargas was married to Rosanna Zamora and they have a child named Basilio Anton Asuncion.

When he was 64, Vargas contracted typhoid fever in Subic. This caused him to have a stroke and fall into a coma after he returned to Manila, and he was rushed to the San Juan de Dios Hospital in Pasay. He died fifteen days later on July 19, 2003. He was cremated and buried at Sacred Heart Church in Makati with his parents.

== Filmography ==
=== Film ===
Year	Title	Role	Notes
1962	Diegong Tabak		
1963	Bird of Paradise		
1963	Prinsipeng Tulisan	Carlos	
1963	Tansan vs Tarsan	Tarsan	
1964	Walang Takot sa Patalim		
1964	Sa Bilis Walang Kaparis		
1965	Mga Espada ng Rubitanya		
1969	Si Darna at ang Planetman	Planetman	Part of the Darna film series
1969	Perlas ng Silangan		
1971	Pagdating sa Dulo		"Initial offering" of Frankesa Films, Inc.
1972	El Vibora	El Vibora	
1973	Nueva Vizcaya		
1974	South Seas		
1974	Urduja		
1974	Ang Pinakamagandang Hayop sa Balat ng Lupa		
1974	Huwag Tularan: Pito ang Asawa Ko		
1976	Daluyong at Habagat		
1976	Iniibig Kita... Father Salvador	Father Salvador	
1977	Sa Dulo ng Kris		
1977	Sinong Kapiling? Sinong Kasiping?		
1977	Banta ng Kahapon		
1978	Mercenario		
1982	Get My Son Dead or Alive	Capt. Carlo Mendoza	
1983	Utol	Berting Bertigo	
1987	Hari sa Hari, Lahi sa Lahi	Paduka Pahala	
1987	Vigilante	Lt. Vergel	
1988	Gawa Na ang Bala Na Papatay sa Iyo	Berto	
1988	Agila ng Maynila	Capt. Victor Labrador	
1989	Boots Oyson: Sa Katawan Mo, Aagos ang Dugo		
1991	Mabuting Kaibigan, Masamang Kaaway	Ricardo Montinola	
1992	Pat. Omar Abdullah: Pulis Probinsiya	Col. Villegas	
1992	Boboy Salonga: Batang Tondo	Victor Salonga	
1993	Alejandro "Diablo" Malubay	Apo Matwa	
1993	Kahit Ako'y Busabos		
1994	Relaks Ka Lang, Sagot Kita	Maj. Mateo	
1994	Biboy Banal: Pagganti Ko.. Tapos Kayo	Mang Maning	
2002	Lapu-Lapu	Raha Humabon	
