= Unyon ng mga Manunulat sa Pilipinas =

Philippine writers' union

Writers' Union of the Philippines (Filipino: Unyon ng mga Manunulat sa Pilipinas, abbreviated as UMPIL) is the largest organization of Filipino writers in the Philippines. Established in 1974, the organization was first known by the English version of its name, the Writers' Union of the Philippines. It has the primary goal of promoting Philippine literature, uniting writers in the Philippines, and providing seminars, workshops, and symposia in order to achieve the first two goals. Its National Congress meeting is held annually on the last Saturday of August. The organization officially used the Filipino-language translation of its name, Unyon ng mga Manunulat ng Pilipinas (UMPIL), in 1987.

== Historical overview ==
The first meeting of UMPIL organizers was held at the Social Security System Building in Quezon City in 1974. Its constitution and by-laws were formally ratified on 29 August 1981. In 1987, UMPIL expanded its representation by including into the Board of Directors representatives from recognized writers’ organizations in languages other than English and Filipino. Among those represented were authors in the Philippine languages such as Ilocano and Bisaya, as well as Spanish and Chinese. In order to protect the rights and interests of Filipino writers, the organization also held multi-sectoral discussions regarding copyright with editors and publishers in the Philippines.

== Leadership ==
Its first chairperson was Adrian E. Cristobal. In 1984, Virgilio S. Almario replaced Cristobal as chairperson of UMPIL. Alfredo Navarro-Salanga became the secretary-general of the organization after the 1984 election of the Board of Directors. After Salanga’s death in 1988, Marne L. Kilates became the organization’s secretary-general. Almario served for three terms. After his resignation in 1992, the chairmanship was given to Michael Bigornia. During Bigornia’s chairmanship, Mario Miclat was the secretary-general.

== Projects ==
After its establishment, the organization launched its first project, the Afro-Asian Writer's Symposium, held in Manila from 3 January to 3 February 1975 in Manila. Other projects that followed included the annual exchange visits of Filipino writers to China, literary symposia, and the publication of a calendar of writers. Beginning 1988, UMPIL started the annual Writers Congress, the provision of seminars regarding literature for teachers, programs for commemorating well-known writers, workshops for writers held in the provinces, and the granting of the Gawad Pambansang Alagad ni Balagtas to deserving Filipino writers. The Gawad Pambansang Alagad ni Balagtas is a lifetime achievement award for writers in various Philippine literatures. Apart from granting the Gawad Pambansang Alagad ni Balagtas, the organization also grants other awards such as the Gawad Paz Marquez Benitez, which is awarded for outstanding contribution in literary education; and the Gawad Pedro Bucaneg to outstanding writers, educators, and literary organizations.

== Publications ==
In 1985, the organization launched its publication of Mithi, a literary journal. In 1991, the organization published its Directory of Filipino Writers.
