= 2022 Philippine local elections in Eastern Visayas =

- May 9, 2022
- Gubernatorial elections
- 6 provincial governors and 2 city mayors
Party	Seats	+/–
PDP–Laban	4	−1
Nacionalista	3	+1
NUP	1	0
This lists parties that won seats. See the complete results below.
- Vice gubernatorial elections
- 6 provincial vice governors and 2 city vice mayors
Party	Seats	+/–
PDP–Laban	4	−1
Nacionalista	2	+1
Aksyon	1	New
NUP	1	0
This lists parties that won seats. See the complete results below.
- Provincial Board elections
- 56 provincial board members and 20 city councilors
Party	Seats	+/–
PDP–Laban	34	−5
Nacionalista	22	+13
NUP	10	+5
Aksyon	4	New
Liberal	2	−8
KNP	1	New
Lakas	1	−4
PDDS	1	New
Tingog	1	New
This lists parties that won seats. See the complete results below.

The following are the results of the 2022 Philippine local elections in Eastern Visayas.

== Summary ==
=== Governors ===
Province/city	Incumbent	Incumbent's party	Winner	Winner's party	Winning margin
Biliran	Rogelio Espina	Nacionalista	Gerard Espina	Nacionalista	78.42%
Eastern Samar	Ben Evardone	PDP–Laban	Ben Evardone	PDP–Laban	79.55%
Leyte	Jericho Petilla	PDP–Laban	Jericho Petilla	PDP–Laban	68.00%
Northern Samar	Edwin Ongchuan	NUP	Edwin Ongchuan	NUP	80.52%
Ormoc (ICC)	Richard Gomez	PDP–Laban	Lucy Torres-Gomez	PDP–Laban	25.69%
Samar	Reynolds Michael Tan	Nacionalista	Sharee Ann Tan	Nacionalista	25.48%
Southern Leyte	Damian Mercado	PDP–Laban	Damian Mercado	PDP–Laban	Unopposed
Tacloban (HUC)	Alfred Romualdez	Nacionalista	Alfred Romualdez	Nacionalista	9.09%

=== Vice governors ===
Province/city	Incumbent	Incumbent's party	Winner	Winner's party	Winning margin
Biliran	Kokoy Caneja	Nacionalista	Kokoy Caneja	Nacionalista	Unopposed
Eastern Samar	Maricar Sison	PDP–Laban	Maricar Sison	PDP–Laban	17.98%
Leyte	Sandy Javier	PDP–Laban	Sandy Javier	PDP–Laban	79.04%
Northern Samar	Gary Lavin	NUP	Clarence Dato	NUP	39.12%
Ormoc (ICC)	Carmelo Locsin Jr.	PDP–Laban	Carmelo Locsin Sr.	PDP–Laban	30.56%
Samar	Angelica Gomez	Liberal	Arnold Tan	Nacionalista	26.88%
Southern Leyte	Christopherson Yap	PDP–Laban	Milai Mercado	PDP–Laban	Unopposed
Tacloban (HUC)	Sambo Yaokasin	Independent	Edwin Chua	Aksyon	3.28%

=== Provincial boards ===
Province/city	Seats	Party control		Composition
Province/city	Seats	Previous	Result	Composition
Biliran	8 elected 3 ex-officio	No majority	Nacionalista	Nacionalista (6); Aksyon (1); Lakas (1)
Eastern Samar	10 elected 3 ex-officio	PDP–Laban	PDP–Laban	PDP–Laban (8); Aksyon (1); PDDS (1)
Leyte	10 elected 3 ex-officio	No majority	PDP–Laban	PDP–Laban (8); Liberal (1); NUP (1)
Northern Samar	10 elected 3 ex-officio	No majority	NUP	NUP (9); Liberal (1)
Ormoc (ICC)	10 elected 2 ex-officio	PDP–Laban	PDP–Laban	PDP–Laban (10)
Samar	10 elected 3 ex-officio	No majority	Nacionalista	Nacionalista (10)
Southern Leyte	8 elected 2 ex-officio	PDP–Laban	PDP–Laban	PDP–Laban (8)
Tacloban (HUC)	10 elected 2 ex-officio	No majority	No majority	Nacionalista (6); Aksyon (2); KNP (1); Tingog (1)

== Biliran ==
=== Governor ===
Incumbent Governor Rogelio Espina of the Nacionalista Party retired.

The Nacionalista Party nominated Espina's son, Naval mayor Gerard Espina, won the election against Edgardo Ambe (PROMDI).

Candidate	Party	Votes	%
Gerard Espina	Nacionalista Party	73,565	89.21
Edgardo Ambe	PROMDI	8,900	10.79
Total		82,465	100.00
Total votes		103,359	–
Registered voters/turnout		123,232	83.87
Nacionalista hold			
Source: Commission on Elections

=== Vice Governor ===
Incumbent Vice Governor Kokoy Caneja of the Nacionalista Party won re-election for a second term unopposed.

Candidate	Party	Votes	%
Kokoy Caneja (incumbent)	Nacionalista Party	54,820	100.00
Total		54,820	100.00
Total votes		103,359	–
Registered voters/turnout		123,232	83.87
Nacionalista hold			
Source: Commission on Elections

=== Provincial Board ===
The Biliran Provincial Board is composed of 11 board members, eight of whom are elected.

The Nacionalista Party won six seats, gaining a majority in the provincial board.

Party	Votes	%	Seats	+/–
Nacionalista Party	121,412	56.76	6	+1
Aksyon Demokratiko	31,326	14.65	1	New
Lakas–CMD	24,772	11.58	1	New
Independent	36,389	17.01	0	0
Total	213,899	100.00	8	0
Total votes	103,359	–		
Registered voters/turnout	123,232	83.87		

==== 1st district ====
Biliran's 1st provincial district consists of the municipalities of Almería, Kawayan and Naval. Four board members are elected from this provincial district.

Four candidates were included in the ballot.

Candidate	Party	Votes	%
Roselyn Espina-Paras	Aksyon Demokratiko	31,326	38.33
Miguel Casas Jr. (incumbent)	Nacionalista Party	18,592	22.75
Lando Ty (incumbent)	Nacionalista Party	16,281	19.92
Ricardo Kho (incumbent)	Nacionalista Party	15,535	19.01
Total		81,734	100.00
Total votes		51,401	–
Registered voters/turnout		62,245	82.58
Source: Commission on Elections

==== 2nd district ====
Biliran's 2nd provincial district consists of the municipalities of Biliran, Cabucgayan, Caibiran, Culaba and Maripipi. Five board members are elected from this provincial district.

Nine candidates were included in the ballot.

Candidate	Party	Votes	%
Grace Casil	Lakas–CMD	24,772	18.74
Gina Enage (incumbent)	Nacionalista Party	24,519	18.55
Allan Paul Tubis (incumbent)	Nacionalista Party	24,463	18.51
Charlie Chan	Nacionalista Party	22,022	16.66
Florida Bunani	Independent	19,430	14.70
Rico Peñaflor	Independent	5,601	4.24
Irvin Cordeta	Independent	5,258	3.98
Berlina Garin	Independent	4,490	3.40
Ruel Rosales	Independent	1,610	1.22
Total		132,165	100.00
Total votes		51,958	–
Registered voters/turnout		60,987	85.20
Source: Commission on Elections

== Eastern Samar ==
=== Governor ===
Incumbent Governor of Eastern Samar Ben Evardone of PDP–Laban ran for a second term.

Evardone won re-election against two other candidates.

Candidate	Party	Votes	%
Ben Evardone (incumbent)	PDP–Laban	211,554	88.52
Petronilo Abuyen Jr.	Partido Federal ng Pilipinas	21,444	8.97
Bishop Hobayan	Independent	6,001	2.51
Total		238,999	100.00
Total votes		293,098	–
Registered voters/turnout		347,616	84.32
PDP–Laban hold			
Source: Commission on Elections

=== Vice Governor ===
Incumbent Vice Governor Maricar Sison of PDP–Laban ran for a second term.

Sison won re-election against former Eastern Samar governor Dindo Picardal (Aksyon Demokratiko), Dado Picardal Jr. (Pederalismo ng Dugong Dakilang Samahan) and Borongan councilor Jesse Solidon (Partido Federal ng Pilipinas).

Candidate	Party	Votes	%
Maricar Sison (incumbent)	PDP–Laban	130,040	55.34
Dindo Picardal	Aksyon Demokratiko	87,787	37.36
Dado Picardal Jr.	Pederalismo ng Dugong Dakilang Samahan	13,394	5.70
Jesse Solidon	Partido Federal ng Pilipinas	3,761	1.60
Total		234,982	100.00
Total votes		293,098	–
Registered voters/turnout		347,616	84.32
PDP–Laban hold			
Source: Commission on Elections

=== Provincial Board ===
The Eastern Samar Provincial Board is composed of 13 board members, 10 of whom are elected.

The PDP–Laban won eight seats, maintaining its majority in the provincial board.

Party	Votes	%	Seats	+/–
PDP–Laban	595,311	65.97	8	0
Aksyon Demokratiko	106,817	11.84	1	New
Pederalismo ng Dugong Dakilang Samahan	89,994	9.97	1	New
Partido Federal ng Pilipinas	49,812	5.52	0	New
Independent	60,420	6.70	0	0
Total	902,354	100.00	10	0
Total votes	293,098	–		
Registered voters/turnout	347,616	84.32		

==== 1st district ====
Eastern Samar's 1st provincial district consists of the city of Borongan and the municipalities of Arteche, Can-avid, Dolores, Jipapad, Maslog, Oras, San Julian, San Policarpo, Sulat and Taft. Five board members are elected from this provincial district.

13 candidates were included in the ballot.

Candidate	Party	Votes	%
Philip Evardone Jr.	Pederalismo ng Dugong Dakilang Samahan	89,994	17.68
Gigi Zacate (incumbent)	PDP–Laban	84,301	16.57
Byron Suyot	PDP–Laban	79,200	15.56
Annabelle Capito (incumbent)	PDP–Laban	63,863	12.55
Jun Quelitano (incumbent)	PDP–Laban	57,980	11.39
Renato Bagacay	Independent	49,425	9.71
Glenn Escoto	Aksyon Demokratiko	33,578	6.60
Celerino Johan Bagro	Aksyon Demokratiko	15,665	3.08
Gio Baquilod	Independent	10,995	2.16
Benedicto Gudes Sr.	Partido Federal ng Pilipinas	7,395	1.45
Juan Buna Jr.	PDP–Laban	6,773	1.33
Thelma Dalina	Partido Federal ng Pilipinas	6,701	1.32
Nicolas Hicao	Partido Federal ng Pilipinas	3,021	0.59
Total		508,891	100.00
Total votes		165,698	–
Registered voters/turnout		197,205	84.02
Source: Commission on Elections

==== 2nd district ====
Eastern Samar's 2nd provincial district consists of the municipalities of Balangiga, Balangkayan, General MacArthur, Giporlos, Guiuan, Hernani, Lawaan, Llorente, Maydolong, Mercedes, Quinapondan and Salcedo. Five board members are elected from this provincial district.

11 candidates were included in the ballot.

Candidate	Party	Votes	%
Pol Gonzales (incumbent)	PDP–Laban	71,946	18.29
Evet Bandoy-Gaylon	PDP–Laban	65,199	16.57
Christelle Yadao (incumbent)	PDP–Laban	64,796	16.47
Melchor Mergal	PDP–Laban	58,126	14.77
Nestonette Cablao	Aksyon Demokratiko	57,574	14.63
Maning Velasco	PDP–Laban	43,127	10.96
Boyboy Baldono	Partido Federal ng Pilipinas	11,857	3.01
Rodito Fabillar	Partido Federal ng Pilipinas	7,683	1.95
Camilo Salazar	Partido Federal ng Pilipinas	6,753	1.72
Doniego Alluso	Partido Federal ng Pilipinas	3,599	0.91
Jose Vallejos	Partido Federal ng Pilipinas	2,803	0.71
Total		393,463	100.00
Total votes		127,400	–
Registered voters/turnout		150,411	84.70
Source: Commission on Elections

== Leyte ==
=== Governor ===
Incumbent Governor Leopoldo Petilla of PDP–Laban was term-limited.

PDP–Laban nominated Petilla's brother, former Secretary of Energy Jericho Petilla, who won the election against two other candidates.

Candidate	Party	Votes	%
Jericho Petilla	PDP–Laban	547,109	82.23
Avit Opiniano	People's Reform Party	94,670	14.23
Romulo Gacgacao	Independent	23,528	3.54
Total		665,307	100.00
Total votes		925,545	–
Registered voters/turnout		1,063,619	87.02
PDP–Laban hold			
Source: Commission on Elections

=== Vice Governor ===
Term-limited incumbent Vice Governor Carlo Loreto of PDP–Laban ran for the Leyte Provincial Board in the 5th provincial district.

PDP–Laban nominated former Javier mayor Sandy Javier, who won the election against Carlo Pilpa (Independent).

Candidate	Party	Votes	%
Sandy Javier	PDP–Laban	510,922	89.52
Carlo Pilpa	Independent	59,790	10.48
Total		570,712	100.00
Total votes		925,545	–
Registered voters/turnout		1,063,619	87.02
PDP–Laban hold			
Source: Commission on Elections

=== Provincial Board ===
The Leyte Provincial Board is composed of 13 board members, 10 of whom are elected.

PDP–Laban won eight seats, gaining a majority in the provincial board.

Party	Votes	%	Seats	+/–
PDP–Laban	656,562	70.58	8	+4
Liberal Party	62,489	6.72	1	New
PROMDI	55,497	5.97	0	New
National Unity Party	46,912	5.04	1	0
Kilusang Bagong Lipunan	32,809	3.53	0	New
People's Reform Party	30,186	3.25	0	New
Independent	45,731	4.92	0	0
Total	930,186	100.00	10	0
Total votes	925,545	–		
Registered voters/turnout	1,063,619	87.02		

==== 1st district ====
Leyte's 1st provincial district consists of the same area as Leyte's 1st legislative district, excluding the city of Tacloban. Two board members are elected from this provincial district.

Four candidates were included in the ballot.

Candidate	Party	Votes	%
Bolingling Reposar	Liberal Party	62,489	42.13
Wilson Uy	PDP–Laban	62,281	41.99
Butch Colasito	People's Reform Party	15,445	10.41
Lito Bagunas	Independent	8,112	5.47
Total		148,327	100.00
Total votes		161,376	–
Registered voters/turnout		184,825	87.31
Source: Commission on Elections

==== 2nd district ====
Leyte's 2nd provincial district consists of the same area as Leyte's 2nd legislative district. Two board members are elected from this provincial district.

Eight candidates were included in the ballot.

Candidate	Party	Votes	%
Ebbie Apostol (incumbent)	PDP–Laban	88,533	34.77
Raissa Villasin (incumbent)	PDP–Laban	80,901	31.78
Dennis Garay	Kilusang Bagong Lipunan	23,933	9.40
Odell Baroña	Independent	18,318	7.19
Felizardo Tiu	People's Reform Party	14,741	5.79
Moises Andrade	Independent	10,282	4.04
Anderson Encarnacion	Independent	9,019	3.54
Bentan Villegas	Kilusang Bagong Lipunan	8,876	3.49
Total		254,603	100.00
Total votes		260,074	–
Registered voters/turnout		295,383	88.05
Source: Commission on Elections

==== 3rd district ====
Leyte's 3rd provincial district consists of the same area as Leyte's 3rd legislative district. Two board members are elected from this provincial district.

Two candidates were included in the ballot.

Candidate	Party	Votes	%
Chinggay Veloso	National Unity Party	46,912	57.53
Maricor Remandaban (incumbent)	PDP–Laban	34,638	42.47
Total		81,550	100.00
Total votes		115,003	–
Registered voters/turnout		131,736	87.30
Source: Commission on Elections

==== 4th district ====
Leyte's 4th provincial district consists of the same area as Leyte's 4th legislative district, excluding the city of Ormoc. Two board members are elected from this provincial district.

Three candidates were included in the ballot.

Candidate	Party	Votes	%
Ivan Centino	PDP–Laban	67,805	36.97
Vince Rama	PDP–Laban	60,102	32.77
Rico Codilla	PROMDI	55,497	30.26
Total		183,404	100.00
Total votes		158,843	–
Registered voters/turnout		181,805	87.37
Source: Commission on Elections

==== 5th district ====
Leyte's 5th provincial district consists of the same area as Leyte's 5th legislative district. Two board members are elected from this provincial district.

Two candidates were included in the ballot.

Candidate	Party	Votes	%
Mike Cari	PDP–Laban	132,501	50.51
Carlo Loreto	PDP–Laban	129,801	49.49
Total		262,302	100.00
Total votes		230,249	–
Registered voters/turnout		269,870	85.32
Source: Commission on Elections

== Northern Samar ==
=== Governor ===
Incumbent Governor Edwin Ongchuan of the National Unity Party ran for a second term.

Ongchuan won re-election against former Philippine Health Insurance Corporation president and CEO Hildegardes Dineros (Independent).

Candidate	Party	Votes	%
Edwin Ongchuan (incumbent)	National Unity Party	226,400	90.26
Hildegardes Dineros	Independent	24,442	9.74
Total		250,842	100.00
Total votes		367,586	–
Registered voters/turnout		453,620	81.03
NUP hold			
Source: Commission on Elections

=== Vice Governor ===
Term-limited incumbent Vice Governor Gary Lavin of the National Unity Party (NUP) ran for mayor of San Antonio.

The NUP nominated San Jose mayor Clarence Dato, who won the election against four other candidates.

Candidate	Party	Votes	%
Clarence Dato	National Unity Party	169,407	65.15
Capo Carpio	Partido Federal ng Pilipinas	67,699	26.03
Emiliano de Asis	Independent	9,748	3.75
Samuel Picardal	PROMDI	7,918	3.04
Proceso Cotero Jr.	Independent	5,263	2.02
Total		260,035	100.00
Total votes		367,586	–
Registered voters/turnout		453,620	81.03
NUP hold			
Source: Commission on Elections

=== Provincial Board ===
The Northern Samar Provincial Board is composed of 13 board members, 10 of whom are elected.

The National Unity Party won nine seats, gaining a majority in the provincial board.

Party	Votes	%	Seats	+/–
National Unity Party	658,979	73.68	9	+5
Liberal Party	82,492	9.22	1	–3
Partido Federal ng Pilipinas	51,389	5.75	0	New
Kilusang Bagong Lipunan	15,519	1.74	0	New
PROMDI	12,459	1.39	0	New
Independent	73,585	8.23	0	0
Total	894,423	100.00	10	0
Total votes	367,586	–		
Registered voters/turnout	453,620	81.03		

==== 1st district ====
Northern Samar's 1st provincial district consists of the same area as Northern Samar's 1st legislative district. Five board members are elected from this provincial district.

10 candidates were included in the ballot.

Candidate	Party	Votes	%
Tantan Uy (incumbent)	National Unity Party	97,925	18.71
Vicvic Singzon	National Unity Party	83,993	16.05
Jing Layon	Liberal Party	82,492	15.76
Tingting Saludaga	National Unity Party	78,385	14.98
Liza Esidera	National Unity Party	62,478	11.94
Oscar Garalde	Partido Federal ng Pilipinas	51,389	9.82
Jaime Bolos	Independent	21,159	4.04
Danny Balading	Independent	18,604	3.55
Nicolas Purog Jr.	Independent	14,483	2.77
Herminia Tafalla	PROMDI	12,459	2.38
Total		523,367	100.00
Total votes		214,355	–
Registered voters/turnout		251,939	85.08
Source: Commission on Elections

==== 2nd district ====
Northern Samar's 2nd provincial district consists of the same area as Northern Samar's 2nd legislative district. Five board members are elected from this provincial district.

Seven candidates were included in the ballot.

Candidate	Party	Votes	%
Don Abalon	National Unity Party	73,778	19.88
Dex Galit	National Unity Party	70,478	18.99
Albert Lucero (incumbent)	National Unity Party	68,985	18.59
Tess Gillamac (incumbent)	National Unity Party	68,869	18.56
Leding Laodenio	National Unity Party	54,088	14.58
Roberto Dulay	Independent	19,339	5.21
Glyn Celajes	Kilusang Bagong Lipunan	15,519	4.18
Total		371,056	100.00
Total votes		153,231	–
Registered voters/turnout		201,681	75.98
Source: Commission on Elections

== Ormoc ==
=== Mayor ===
Incumbent Mayor Richard Gomez of PDP–Laban ran for the House of Representatives in Leyte's 4th legislative district.

PDP–Laban nominated Gomez' wife, representative Lucy Torres-Gomez, who won the election against former Ormoc mayor Ondo Codilla (People's Reform Party) and two other candidates.

Candidate	Party	Votes	%
Lucy Torres-Gomez	PDP–Laban	73,866	62.28
Ondo Codilla	People's Reform Party	43,401	36.59
Glend Gomez	Partido Pilipino sa Pagbabago	959	0.81
Joemar Gallardo	Independent	383	0.32
Total		118,609	100.00
Total votes		128,341	–
Registered voters/turnout		143,686	89.32
PDP–Laban hold			
Source: Commission on Elections

=== Vice Mayor ===
Incumbent Vice Mayor Carmelo Locsin Jr. of PDP–Laban was term-limited.

PDP–Laban nominated his father, former Ormoc mayor Carmelo Locsin Sr., who won the election against Francis Pepito (Aksyon Demokratiko).

Candidate	Party	Votes	%
Toto Locsin	PDP–Laban	67,779	65.28
Francis Pepito	Aksyon Demokratiko	36,055	34.72
Total		103,834	100.00
Total votes		128,341	–
Registered voters/turnout		143,686	89.32
PDP–Laban hold			
Source: Commission on Elections

=== City Council ===
The Ormoc City Council is composed of 12 councilors, 10 of whom are elected.

24 candidates were included in the ballot.

PDP–Laban won 10 seats, maintaining its majority in the city council.

Party	Votes	%	Seats	+/–
PDP–Laban	588,146	62.56	10	0
People's Reform Party	165,830	17.64	0	New
Aksyon Demokratiko	156,091	16.60	0	New
Independent	30,098	3.20	0	New
Total	940,165	100.00	10	0
Total votes	128,341	–		
Registered voters/turnout	143,686	89.32		

Candidate	Party	Votes	%
Roiland Villasencio (incumbent)	PDP–Laban	67,794	7.21
Nolitz Quilang (incumbent)	PDP–Laban	66,061	7.03
Rey Evangelista	PDP–Laban	65,954	7.02
Perok Rodriguez (incumbent)	PDP–Laban	59,974	6.38
Goito Yrastorza (incumbent)	PDP–Laban	59,920	6.37
Jasper Lucero (incumbent)	PDP–Laban	59,622	6.34
Caren Torres-Rama	PDP–Laban	55,553	5.91
Edmund Kierulf	PDP–Laban	55,206	5.87
Burt Pades	PDP–Laban	49,648	5.28
Lalaine Marcos (incumbent)	PDP–Laban	48,414	5.15
Danda Codilla	People's Reform Party	39,046	4.15
Macoy Larrazabal	People's Reform Party	38,074	4.05
Godi Ebcas	Aksyon Demokratiko	37,839	4.02
Conrad Conopio	Aksyon Demokratiko	35,154	3.74
Jun-jun Sia	People's Reform Party	32,762	3.48
Voltaire Conejos	People's Reform Party	31,969	3.40
Wenceslao Arcuino Jr.	Aksyon Demokratiko	30,754	3.27
Dodjie Omega	Aksyon Demokratiko	28,468	3.03
Tikboy Mañago	People's Reform Party	23,979	2.55
Nelly Navales	Aksyon Demokratiko	23,876	2.54
Jose Renante Terre	Independent	17,960	1.91
Tata Boaquin	Independent	5,523	0.59
Joey Cordero	Independent	3,764	0.40
Cecilio Taboada	Independent	2,851	0.30
Total		940,165	100.00
Total votes		128,341	–
Registered voters/turnout		143,686	89.32
Source: Commission on Elections

== Samar ==
=== Governor ===
Incumbent Governor Reynolds Michael Tan of the Nacionalista Party ran for the House of Representatives in Samar's 2nd legislative district. He became governor on November 30, 2019, after Milagrosa Tan died.

The Nacionalista Party nominated Tan's sister, representative Sharee Ann Tan, who won the election against Santa Margarita mayor Gemma Zosa (National Unity Party) and two other candidates.

Candidate	Party	Votes	%
Sharee Ann Tan	Nacionalista Party	293,557	62.27
Gemma Zosa	National Unity Party	173,457	36.79
Ronald Paldez	Independent	2,847	0.60
Billy Golden	Independent	1,600	0.34
Total		471,461	100.00
Total votes		511,268	–
Registered voters/turnout		597,290	85.60
Nacionalista hold			
Source: Commission on Elections

=== Vice Governor ===
Incumbent Vice Governor Angelica Gomez of the Liberal Party ran for the Samar Provincial Board in the 1st provincial district. She became vice governor on November 30, 2019, after Reynolds Michael Tan became governor upon Milagrosa Tan's death.

The Liberal Party nominated Catbalogan councilor Alma Uy-Lampasa, who was defeated by Arnold Tan (Nacionalista Party).

Candidate	Party	Votes	%
Arnold Tan	Nacionalista Party	277,561	63.44
Alma Uy-Lampasa	Liberal Party	159,964	36.56
Total		437,525	100.00
Total votes		511,268	–
Registered voters/turnout		597,290	85.60
Nacionalista gain from Liberal			
Source: Commission on Elections

=== Provincial Board ===
The Samar Provincial Board consists of 13 board members, 10 of whom are elected.

The Nacionalista Party won 10 seats, gaining a majority in the provincial board.

Party	Votes	%	Seats	+/–
Nacionalista Party	1,175,326	65.19	10	+10
Liberal Party	301,271	16.71	0	–5
National Unity Party	142,664	7.91	0	New
Aksyon Demokratiko	70,995	3.94	0	New
Independent	112,735	6.25	0	0
Total	1,802,991	100.00	10	0
Total votes	511,268	–		
Registered voters/turnout	597,290	85.60		

==== 1st district ====
Samar's 1st provincial district consists of the same area as Samar's 1st legislative district. Five board members are elected from this provincial district.

10 candidates were included in the ballot.

Candidate	Party	Votes	%
Alan Diomangay	Nacionalista Party	123,899	12.63
Edward Clemens	Nacionalista Party	123,292	12.57
Milay Olaje	Nacionalista Party	121,195	12.36
Lydia de los Reyes	Nacionalista Party	117,500	11.98
Anecio Guades	Nacionalista Party	115,238	11.75
Angelica Gomez	Liberal Party	82,167	8.38
Julius Mancol (incumbent)	Liberal Party	78,551	8.01
Ina Rabuya (incumbent)	Liberal Party	77,275	7.88
Alex Gelera	Aksyon Demokratiko	70,995	7.24
Fred Serrano (incumbent)	National Unity Party	70,659	7.20
Total		980,771	100.00
Total votes		232,253	–
Registered voters/turnout		260,534	89.14
Source: Commission on Elections

==== 2nd district ====
Samar's 2nd provincial district consists of the same area as Samar's 2nd legislative district. Five board members are elected from this provincial district.

12 candidates were included in the ballot.

Candidate	Party	Votes	%
Fe Arcales (incumbent)	Nacionalista Party	129,397	15.74
Bebot Nacario (incumbent)	Nacionalista Party	125,459	15.26
Bembot Bermejo	Nacionalista Party	121,211	14.74
Elpa Estorninos-de Jesus	Nacionalista Party	100,848	12.27
Neng Neng Sabenecio	Nacionalista Party	97,287	11.83
Joyce Lim	Independent	76,831	9.34
Buboy Torres	National Unity Party	36,628	4.45
Edgar Navales	National Unity Party	35,377	4.30
Joecal Calderon	Liberal Party	34,485	4.19
Iyang Mejes	Liberal Party	28,793	3.50
Jason Ty	Independent	20,425	2.48
Edwin Panican	Independent	15,479	1.88
Total		822,220	100.00
Total votes		279,015	–
Registered voters/turnout		336,756	82.85
Source: Commission on Elections

== Southern Leyte ==
=== Governor ===
Incumbent Governor Damian Mercado of PDP–Laban won re-election for a third term unopposed.

Candidate	Party	Votes	%
Damian Mercado (incumbent)	PDP–Laban	167,859	100.00
Total		167,859	100.00
Total votes		254,159	–
Registered voters/turnout		293,635	86.56
PDP–Laban hold			
Source: Commission on Elections

=== Vice Governor ===
Incumbent Vice Governor Christopherson Yap of PDP–Laban ran for the House of Representatives in Southern Leyte's 2nd legislative district.

PDP–Laban nominated Milai Mercado, sister of Governor Damian Mercado, who won the election unopposed.

Candidate	Party	Votes	%
Milai Mercado	PDP–Laban	167,859	100.00
Total		167,859	100.00
Total votes		254,159	–
Registered voters/turnout		293,635	86.56
PDP–Laban hold			
Source: Commission on Elections

=== Provincial Board ===
The Southern Leyte Provincial Board is composed of 10 board members, eight of whom are elected.

PDP–Laban won eight seats, maintaining its majority in the provincial board.

Party	Votes	%	Seats	+/–
PDP–Laban	399,559	73.00	8	+1
Liberal Party	49,182	8.99	0	0
Partido Federal ng Pilipinas	37,842	6.91	0	New
Lakas–CMD	23,054	4.21	0	–1
Independent	37,672	6.88	0	0
Total	547,309	100.00	8	0
Total votes	254,159	–		
Registered voters/turnout	293,635	86.56		

==== 1st district ====
Southern Leyte's 1st provincial district consists of the same area as Southern Leyte's 1st legislative district. Five board members are elected from this provincial district.

Six candidates were included in the ballot.

Candidate	Party	Votes	%
Fe Edillo (incumbent)	PDP–Laban	54,093	22.01
Jojo Maraon	PDP–Laban	50,731	20.64
Boy Rojas (incumbent)	PDP–Laban	45,950	18.69
Pete Fustanes (incumbent)	PDP–Laban	39,187	15.94
Ty Duarte	Liberal Party	20,840	8.48
Rey Catarman	Lakas–CMD	17,412	7.08
Oscar Camus	Liberal Party	6,388	2.60
Onie Maningo	Lakas–CMD	5,642	2.30
Jimmy Mindanao	Independent	5,559	2.26
Total		245,802	100.00
Total votes		116,426	–
Registered voters/turnout		133,753	87.05
Source: Commission on Elections

==== 2nd district ====
Southern Leyte's 2nd provincial district consists of the same area as Southern Leyte's 2nd legislative district. Five board members are elected from this provincial district.

Seven candidates were included in the ballot.

Candidate	Party	Votes	%
Nap Regis (incumbent)	PDP–Laban	60,015	19.91
Myra Rentuza (incumbent)	PDP–Laban	57,867	19.19
Rolan Bacoy (incumbent)	PDP–Laban	50,385	16.71
Boy Mortera	PDP–Laban	41,331	13.71
Edmundo Villa	Partido Federal ng Pilipinas	37,842	12.55
Nazario Amper	Independent	24,115	8.00
Pol Baclayon	Liberal Party	12,813	4.25
Romulo Bautista	Liberal Party	9,141	3.03
Berting Lariba	Independent	7,998	2.65
Total		301,507	100.00
Total votes		137,733	–
Registered voters/turnout		159,882	86.15
Source: Commission on Elections

== Tacloban ==
=== Mayor ===
Incumbent Mayor Alfred Romualdez of the Nacionalista Party ran for a second term.

Romualdez won re-election against Tacloban vice mayor Sambo Yaokasin (Independent) and Quintin Nilo Ayuste (Independent).

Candidate	Party	Votes	%
Alfred Romualdez (incumbent)	Nacionalista	63,976	54.42
Sambo Yaokasin	Independent	53,289	45.33
Quintin Nilo Ayuste	Independent	303	0.26
Total		117,568	100.00
Total votes		123,120	–
Registered voters/turnout		143,562	85.76
Nacionalista hold			
Source: Commission on Elections

=== Vice Mayor ===
Term-limited incumbent Vice Mayor Sambo Yaokasin ran for mayor of Tacloban as an independent.

Yaokasin endorsed Edwin Chua (Aksyon Demokratiko), who won the election against Mayor Alfred Romualdez' son, Raymund Romualdez (Nacionalista Party).

Candidate	Party	Votes	%
Edwin Chua	Aksyon Demokratiko	56,478	51.64
Raymund Romualdez	Nacionalista Party	52,887	48.36
Total		109,365	100.00
Total votes		123,120	–
Registered voters/turnout		143,562	85.76
Aksyon gain from Independent			
Source: Commission on Elections

=== City Council ===
The Tacloban City Council is composed of 12 councilors, 10 of whom are elected.

26 candidates were included in the ballot.

The Nacionalista Party won six seats, remaining as the largest party in the city council.

Party	Votes	%	Seats	+/–
Nacionalista Party	359,289	46.21	6	+2
Aksyon Demokratiko	102,711	13.21	2	New
Katipunan ng Nagkakaisang Pilipino	96,029	12.35	1	New
Tingog Sinirangan	46,387	5.97	1	New
Liberal Party	37,869	4.87	0	–1
Independent	135,219	17.39	0	–2
Total	777,504	100.00	10	0
Total votes	123,120	–		
Registered voters/turnout	143,562	85.76		

Candidate	Party	Votes	%
Jerry Uy	Katipunan ng Nagkakaisang Pilipino	60,477	7.78
Edward Frederick Chua	Aksyon Demokratiko	60,065	7.73
Elvie Casal (incumbent)	Nacionalista Party	59,015	7.59
Edson Malaki	Nacionalista Party	52,546	6.76
Aimee Grafil (incumbent)	Nacionalista Party	49,276	6.34
Leo Bahin (incumbent)	Tingog	46,387	5.97
Yanyan Granados (incumbent)	Nacionalista Party	46,338	5.96
Tata Granados	Nacionalista Party	45,696	5.88
Chris Esperas	Nacionalista Party	42,924	5.52
Rachelle Erica Pineda (incumbent)	Aksyon Demokratiko	42,646	5.48
Marvin Modelo	Nacionalista Party	38,016	4.89
Lucky Bagulaya	Liberal Party	37,869	4.87
Neil Glova	Katipunan ng Nagkakaisang Pilipino	35,552	4.57
Abet Eviota	Independent	32,870	4.23
Larry Portillo	Independent	31,755	4.08
Manix Marta	Nacionalista Party	25,478	3.28
Jimmy Laurente	Independent	19,940	2.56
Pax Condalor	Independent	18,152	2.33
Bomboy Lledo	Independent	9,029	1.16
Renato Sipaco	Independent	5,113	0.66
Jerry Borja	Independent	4,315	0.55
Adrian Banzon	Independent	3,403	0.44
Ricardo Pantoja	Independent	3,157	0.41
Luther Loreno	Independent	2,969	0.38
Tito Ayes	Independent	2,375	0.31
Ervin Camenting	Independent	2,141	0.28
Total		777,504	100.00
Total votes		123,120	–
Registered voters/turnout		143,562	85.76
Source: Commission on Elections
