= 2013 Philippine House of Representatives elections in Eastern Visayas =

Elections were held in Eastern Visayas for seats in the House of Representatives of the Philippines on May 13, 2013.

== Summary ==
Party	Popular vote	%	Swing	Seats won	Change
Liberal	663,038	47.68%		7	▼1
Nacionalista	178,650	12.85%		1	Steady
Lakas	165,801	11.92%		1	Steady
NUP	157,452	11.32%		2	Steady
NPC	68,137	4.90%		1	▲1
UNA	47,794	3.44%		0	Steady
Akbayan	34,239	2.46%		0	Steady
Tingog Leytenon	34,025	2.45%		0	Steady
PMP	29,040	2.09%		0	Steady
PDP–Laban	9,470	0.68%		0	Steady
Independent	3,009	0.22%		0	Steady
Valid votes	1,390,655	85.30%		12	
Invalid votes	239,627	14.70%			
Turnout	1,630,282	63.28%			
Registered voters	2,576,229	100.00%			

== Biliran ==
Rogelio Espina is the incumbent.

Philippine House of Representatives election at Biliran's district
Party	Candidate	Votes	%
Liberal	Rogelio Espina	38,329	52.29
PMP	Glenn Chong	29,040	39.62
Independent	Paul Giovanni Diu	171	0.23
Margin of victory		9,289	12.67%
Invalid or blank votes		5,754	7.85
Total votes		73,294	100.00
Liberal hold			

== Eastern Samar ==
Ben Evardone is the incumbent.

Philippine House of Representatives election at Eastern Samar's lone district
Party	Candidate	Votes	%
Liberal	Ben Evardone	79,083	47.16
Nacionalista	Annaliza Gonzales-Kwan	75,131	44.81
Independent	Febidal Fadel	402	0.24
Margin of victory		3,952	2.36%
Invalid or blank votes		13,060	7.79
Total votes		167,676	100.00
Liberal hold			

== Leyte ==
=== 1st District ===
Incumbent Ferdinand Martin Romualdez is running unopposed.

Philippine House of Representatives election at Leyte's 1st district
Party	Candidate	Votes	%
Lakas	Ferdinand Martin Romualdez	122,022	56.05%
Invalid or blank votes		95,672	43.95%
Total votes		217,694	100.00%
Lakas hold			

=== 2nd District ===
Sergio Apostol is the incumbent.

Philippine House of Representatives election at Leyte's 2nd district
Party	Candidate	Votes	%
Liberal	Sergio Apostol	71,018	44.86
Tingog Leytenon	Edgardo Enerlan	34,025	21.49
PDP–Laban	Alberto Hidalgo	9,470	5.98
Margin of victory		36,993	23.37%
Invalid or blank votes		43,809	27.67
Total votes		158,322	100.00
Liberal hold			

=== 3rd District ===
Andres Salvacion is the incumbent.

Philippine House of Representatives election at Leyte's 3rd district
Party	Candidate	Votes	%
Liberal	Andres Salvacion	31,088	54.15
UNA	Bernard Jonathan Ramandaban	20,773	36.18
Margin of victory		10,315	17.97%
Invalid or blank votes		5,547	9.66
Total votes		57,408	100.00
Liberal hold			

=== 4th District ===
Lucy Torres-Gomez is the incumbent.

Philippine House of Representatives election at Leyte's 4th district
Party	Candidate	Votes	%
Liberal	Lucy Torres-Gomez	106,291	53.29
Lakas	Eric Codilla	78,662	39.44
Margin of victory		27,629	13.85%
Invalid or blank votes		14,510	7.27
Total votes		199,463	100.00
Liberal hold			

=== 5th District ===
Jose Carlos Cari is the incumbent.

Philippine House of Representatives election at Leyte's 5th district
Party	Candidate	Votes	%
Liberal	Jose Carlos Cari	78,149	63.10
UNA	Renato Roble	16,779	13.66
Independent	Crispulo Truya	780	0.63
Margin of victory		61,370	49.95
Invalid or blank votes		27,147	22.10
Total votes		122,855	100.00
Liberal hold			

== Northern Samar ==
=== 1st District ===
Raul Daza is the incumbent.

Philippine House of Representatives election at Northern Samar's 1st district
Party	Candidate	Votes	%
Nacionalista	Harlin Abayon	72,857	50.02
Liberal	Raul Daza	72,805	49.98
Margin of victory		52	0.04%
Total votes		145,662	100.00
Nacionalista gain from Liberal			

=== 2nd District ===
Emil Ong is the incumbent.

Philippine House of Representatives election at Northern Samar's 2nd district
Party	Candidate	Votes	%
NUP	Emil Ong	71,533	60.35
Liberal	Ramp Nielsen Uy	46,988	39.65
Margin of victory		24,545	20.71
Total votes		118,521	100.00
NUP hold			

== Samar ==
=== 1st District ===
Mel Senen Sarmiento is the incumbent.

Philippine House of Representatives election at Samar's 1st district
Party	Candidate	Votes	%
Liberal	Mel Senen Sarmiento	51,335	52.71
Nacionalista	Arnold Tan	30,662	31.48
Independent	Antolin Tan	771	0.79
Margin of victory		20,673	21.23%
Invalid or blank votes		14,624	15.02
Total votes		97,392	100.00
Liberal hold			

=== 2nd District ===
Milagrosa Tan is the incumbent.

Philippine House of Representatives election at Samar's 2nd district
Party	Candidate	Votes	%
NPC	Milagrosa Tan	68,137	43.77
Liberal	Eunice Babalcon	56,312	36.18
UNA	Reynato Latorre	10,242	6.58
Margin of victory		11,825	7.60%
Invalid or blank votes		20,973	13.47
Total votes		155,664	100.00
NPC hold			

== Southern Leyte ==
Incumbent Roger Mercado is term limited and is running for the governorship. Incumbent governor Damian Mercado is his party's nominee.

Philippine House of Representatives election at Southern Leyte's district
Party	Candidate	Votes	%
NUP	Damian Mercado	85,919	48.46
Akbayan	Rico Rentuza	34,239	19.31
Liberal	Marisa Lerias	31,640	17.85
Independent	Vicente Geraldo	885	0.50
Margin of victory		51,680	29.15%
Invalid or blank votes		24,612	13.88
Total votes		177,295	100.00
NUP hold			
