= Hilabaan Island =

Island in the Philippines

Hilabaan Island (12.0525°N 125.563611°E)

Hilabaan is one of the biggest barangays in the Municipality of Dolores, Eastern, Samar. According to 2020 census, it has a population of 2,978 people in 612 households. The Barangay covers the entire island of Hilabaan on which the barrio is located, Sibay Island, Kaybani Island, Magtina, and Monbon. The barangay has two sitio: Sitio Botnga and Sitio Kaybani.

The first settlement of the Barangay was established on the island of "Darnasan", but due to it being inaccessible nor it was decided to transfer the barangay to 'Rawis".

== Public services ==
Hiliabaan has 4 schools: Hilabaan National High School, Hilabaan Elementary School, Botnga Elementary School, and Caybane Primary School. It has facilities for Health through its Barangay Health Center located near the Nuestra Senyora Del Carmen Church, the patron saint of the Barrio.
