= Mater Divinae Gratiae College =

Roman Catholic college in Eastern Samar, Philippines

- Type: Private School, Franciscan, College
- Established: 1995
- Location: Camp Picardo Airport, Dolores, Eastern Samar, Philippines; 12°02′08″N 125°29′22″E
- Location in the Visayas Location in the Philippines

Mater Divinae Gratiae College is a private higher educational institution in the municipality of Dolores in Eastern Samar. It was elevated into a college in 1995, and offered bachelor's degree in education. It was then followed with program offerings in computer and secretarial education. It is the only tertiary institution in the town.

In a paper presented at the National Convention for Statistics in the Philippines, the school listed as among low-ranking in the licensure examination for elementary teachers.

== History ==
The college first begun as an elementary and high school prior to becoming a college. The Saint Franciscan congregation of nuns operated the school for many years prior to its elevation into a college.

In 1995, the Commission on Higher Education allowed its application to offer courses of higher learning. The college then offered a degree program in education. It followed through with offering in trade and arts courses under TESDA.

Today, it is accredited by two of the government's accrediting agencies; the Commission on Higher Education and the Technical Education and Skills Development Authority.

== Course offerings ==
- Bachelor in Education Commission on
- Computer Hardware Servicing NC II
