= Kaybani =

Island in the Philippines

- Location within Philippines

Geography
- Coordinates: 12°3′53″N 125°34′11″E
- Adjacent to: Philippine Sea

Administration
- Philippines
- Region: Eastern Visayas
- Province: Eastern Samar
- Municipality: Dolores

Kaybani is an island located off the coast of the town of Dolores, Eastern Samar in the Visayan Islands of the Philippines facing the Philippine Sea. It is the twin island of Tubabao.
