= The Sweet Life (TV program) =

Philippine television infotainment show

- Title card
- Genre: Infotainment
- Presented by: Lucy Torres-Gomez; Iza Calzado; Grace Lee; Wilma Doesnt
- Country of origin: Philippines
- Original language: Tagalog

Production
- Camera setup: Multiple-camera setup
- Running time: 44–49 minutes
- Production company: GMA Entertainment TV

Original release
- Network: Q
- Release: March 19, 2007 – February 18, 2011

The Sweet Life is a Philippine television lifestyle infotainment show broadcast by Q. Hosted by Lucy Torres-Gomez, Iza Calzado, Grace Lee and Wilma Doesnt, it premiered on March 19, 2007. The show concluded on February 18, 2011.

The show is streaming online on YouTube.

== Hosts ==
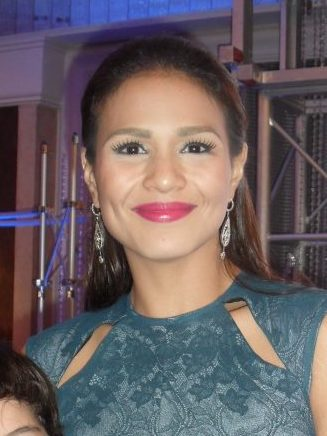
Iza Calzado serves as a host.

- Lucy Torres-Gomez
- Wilma Doesnt
- Iza Calzado
- Grace Lee
