= Oras, Eastern Samar =

Oras
- Municipality
- Municipality of Oras
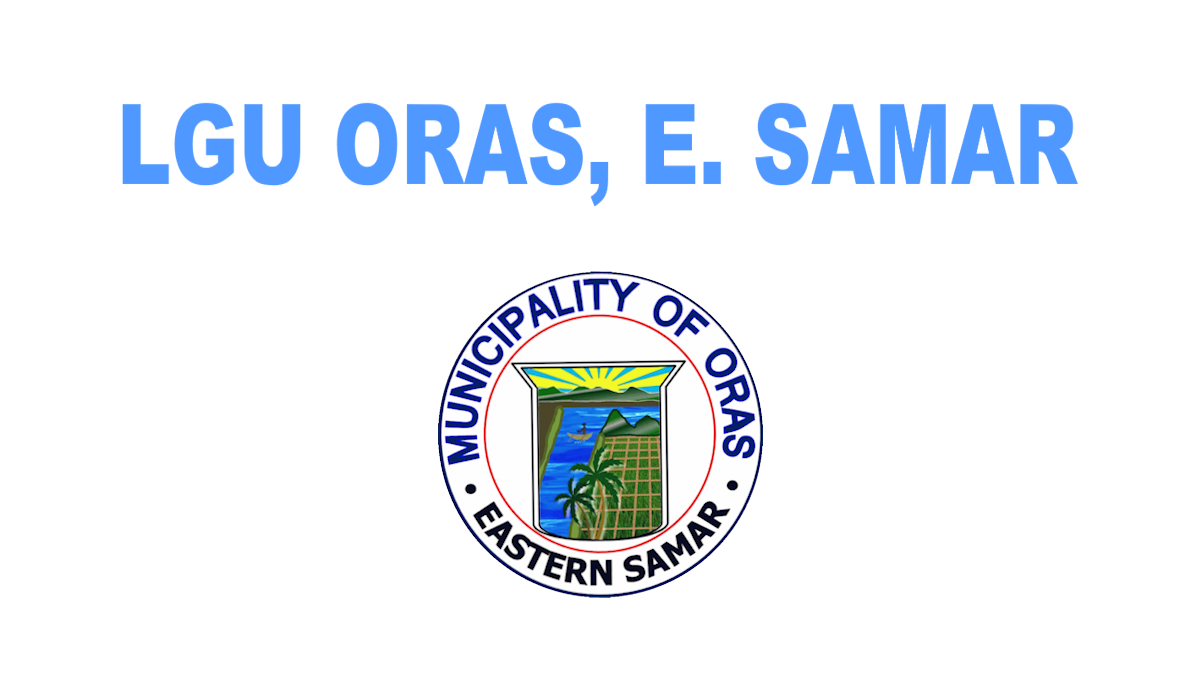
- Flag

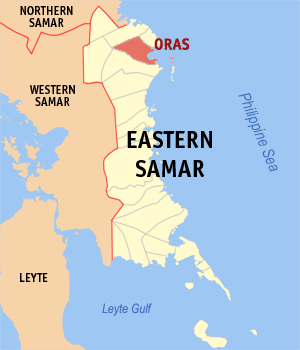
- Map of Eastern Samar with Oras highlighted
- Interactive map of Oras
- Location within the Philippines
- Coordinates: 12°08′29″N 125°26′21″E
- Country: Philippines
- Region: Eastern Visayas
- Province: Eastern Samar
- District: Lone district
- Barangays: 42 (see Barangays)

Government
  - Type: Sangguniang Bayan
  - Mayor: Roy C. Ador
  - Vice Mayor: Adolfo A. Mugas
  - Representative: Maria Fe R. Abunda
  - Councilors: List: • Samantha N. Maestre; • Riel P. Villalon; • Jimmy U. Umil Jr.; • Aldwin M. Picardal; • Michael L. Maestre; • Edwin C. Moslares; • Fernado Carlo L. Batica; • Gil M. Montibon; Province of Eastern Samar - Local Officials
  - Electorate: 29,016 voters (2025)

Area
  - Total: 188.7 km^{2} (72.9 sq mi)
- Elevation: 19 m (62 ft)
- Highest elevation: 138 m (453 ft)
- Lowest elevation: 0 m (0 ft)

Population (2024 census)
  - Total: 35,997
  - Density: 190.8/km^{2} (494.1/sq mi)
  - Households: 8,871
- Demonym: Orasnon

Economy
  - Income class: 2nd municipal income class
  - Poverty incidence: 34.81% (2023)
  - Revenue: ₱ 196.1 million (2024)
  - Assets: ₱ 881.8 million (2024)
  - Expenditure: ₱ 187.4 million (2024)
  - Liabilities: ₱ 325.5 million (2024)

Service provider
  - Electricity: Eastern Samar Electric Cooperative (ESAMELCO)
- Time zone: UTC+8 (PST)
- ZIP code: 6802
- PSGC: 0802617000
- IDD : area code: +63 (0)55
- Native languages: Waray; Tagalog

Oras (Tagalog pronunciation: [oˈras]), officially the Municipality of Oras (Waray: Bungto han Oras; Tagalog: Bayan ng Oras), is a municipality in the province of Eastern Samar, Philippines. According to the 2024 census, it has a population of 35,997 people.

== History ==
Oras is previously part of the undivided province of Samar. In 1948, San Policarpo was created from the barrios of San Policarpo, Bahay, Alugan, Pangpang, Japonan, Tabo, Binogawan and Cajag-wayan, which used to belong to Oras. The territory of Oras was further reduced two years later, when Arteche was created from the barrios of San Ramon, Carapdapan, Beri, Tangbo, Catumsan, Bego, Concepcion, Casidman, Tawagan, and Tibalawon.

In 1952, the sitios of Trinidad, Tula, Pota, Palao, Sinalo-an, Tamse-on, Cagmalobago, and Maycorot, in the barrio of Agsam, were separated from said barrio and created into the barrio of Trinidad. In the same year, Santa Monica was transferred to the town of San Policarpo.

In 1956, a portion of Oras was excised to form the new municipality of Lapinig. In 1965, as a result of the partition of Samar, Oras became part of the newly established province of Eastern Samar.

== Geography ==
=== Barangays ===
Oras is politically subdivided into 42 barangays. Each barangay consists of puroks and some have sitios.

- Agsam
- Bagacay
- Balingasag
- Balocawe (Poblacion)
- Bantayan
- Batang
- Bato
- Binalayan
- Buntay
- Burak
- Butnga (Poblacion)
- Cadian
- Cagdine
- Cagpile
- Cagtoog
- Camanga (Poblacion)
- Dalid
- Dao
- Factoria
- Gamot
- Iwayan
- Japay
- Kalaw
- Mabuhay
- Malingon
- Minap-os
- Nadacpan
- Naga
- Pangudtan
- Paypayon (Poblacion)
- Riverside (Poblacion)
- Rizal
- Sabang
- San Eduardo
- Santa Monica
- Saugan
- Saurong
- Tawagan (Poblacion)
- Tiguib (Poblacion)
- Trinidad (Maycorot)
- Alang-alang
- San Roque (Poblacion)

=== Climate ===
Climate data for Oras, Eastern Samar
Month	Jan	Feb	Mar	Apr	May	Jun	Jul	Aug	Sep	Oct	Nov	Dec	Year
Mean daily maximum °C (°F)	27 (81)	27 (81)	28 (82)	29 (84)	30 (86)	30 (86)	29 (84)	29 (84)	29 (84)	29 (84)	28 (82)	28 (82)	29 (83)
Mean daily minimum °C (°F)	22 (72)	22 (72)	22 (72)	23 (73)	24 (75)	24 (75)	24 (75)	24 (75)	24 (75)	24 (75)	23 (73)	23 (73)	23 (74)
Average precipitation mm (inches)	97 (3.8)	64 (2.5)	69 (2.7)	58 (2.3)	98 (3.9)	161 (6.3)	167 (6.6)	140 (5.5)	158 (6.2)	171 (6.7)	169 (6.7)	154 (6.1)	1,506 (59.3)
Average rainy days	17.1	13.4	14.8	15.2	21.1	25.2	26.8	25.4	25.5	26.5	23.0	20.3	254.3
Source: Meteoblue (modeled/calculated data, not measured locally)

== Demographics ==
Population census of Oras

Year	Pop.	±% p.a.
1903	10,429	—
1918	12,066	+0.98%
1939	20,962	+2.66%
1948	19,300	−0.91%
1960	20,198	+0.38%
1970	21,217	+0.49%
1975	23,162	+1.77%
1980	27,031	+3.14%

Year	Pop.	±% p.a.
1990	26,978	−0.02%
1995	31,533	+2.97%
2000	31,315	−0.15%
2007	31,745	+0.19%
2010	34,760	+3.36%
2015	36,540	+0.96%
2020	37,451	+0.52%
2024	35,997	−0.95%

Source: Philippine Statistics Authority

The population of Oras in the 2024 census was 35,997 people, with a density of 190 inhabitants per square kilometre or 490 inhabitants per square mile.

== Economy ==
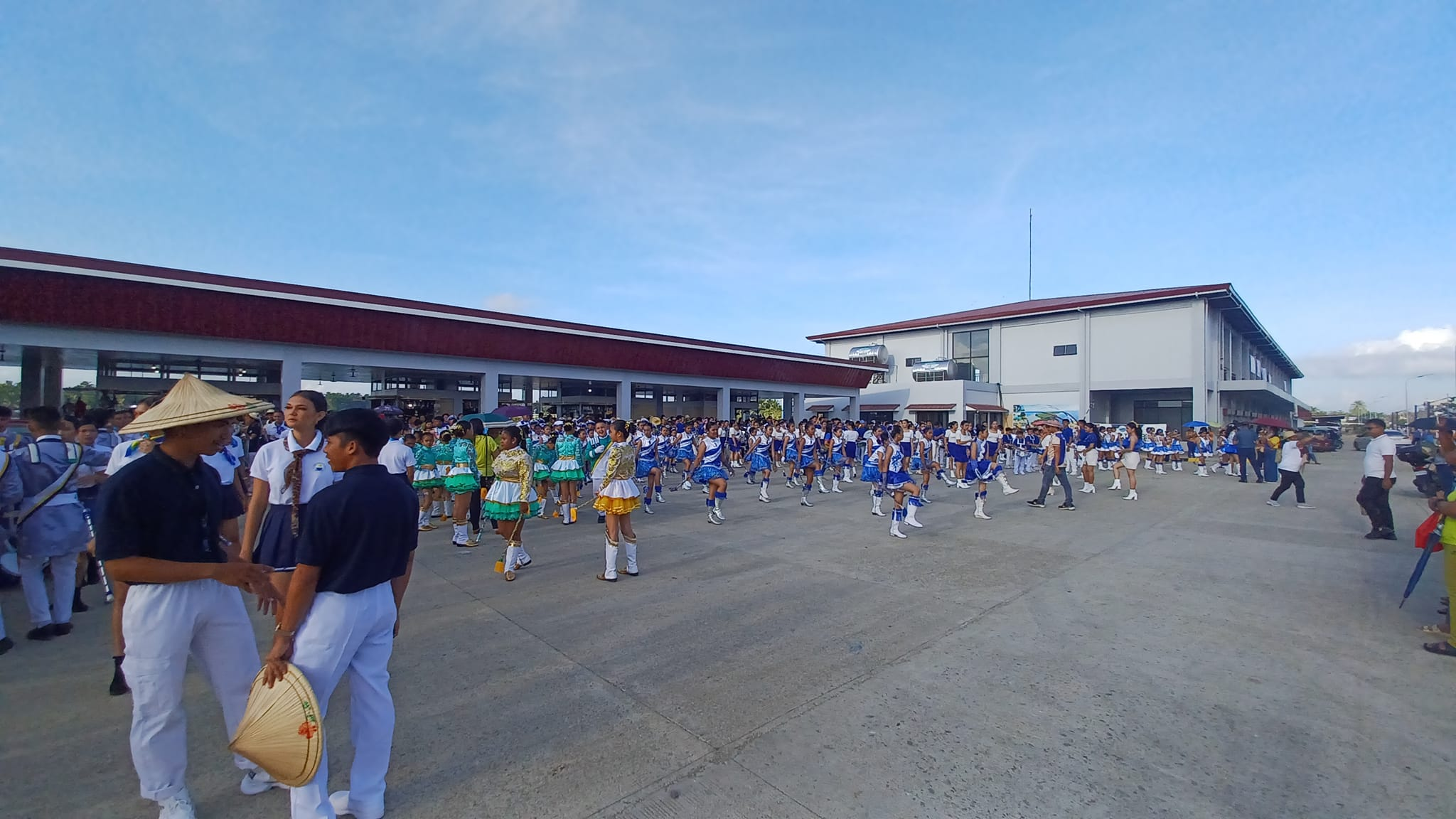
Oras Integrated Public Market and Bus Terminal

Agriculture is the main source of income for the people of Oras. The major products are coconut, rice, abaca and fish. It devoted a total land area of 13,582.14 hectares comprising 63.01% of the total land to agricultural production.

It is strategically located at the center of the Municipalities of Dolores, Jipapad, San Policarpo, and Arteche. It has a great advantage in the transportation of goods and services, in that agricultural goods from these municipalities pass directly through Oras. The commercial areas in the municipality are accessible by other municipalities and upstream barangays through the municipal wharf. This serves as an entry and exit point in transportation of commercial products in and out of the municipality.

The municipality of Oras received the Seal of Good Financial Housekeeping from the Department of Interior and Local Government (DILG) for 2023. It is an award for the LGU's performance in terms of good financial housekeeping, disaster preparedness, social protection for the basic sector, business-friendly and competitiveness, environment compliance, law and order and public safety.

Poverty incidence of Oras (%)

Source: Philippine Statistics Authority

== Education ==
Oras has 39 public elementary schools, 5 public high schools, and 1 private high school.

=== Elementary ===
- Agsam Elementary School
- Alang-alang Primary School
- Anacta Primary School
- Bagacay Elementary School
- Balingasag Elementary School
- Balocawe Elementary School
- Bantayan Elementary School
- Batang Elementary School
- Bato Primary School
- Binalayan Elementary School
- Buntay Elementary School
- Burak Elementary School
- Cadi-an Elementary School
- Cagdine Elementary School
- Cagpile Elementary School
- Cagtoog Elementary School
- Dalid Elementary School
- Dao Integrated School
- Factoria Elementary School
- Gamot Elementary School
- Iwayan Elementary School
- Japay Elementary School
- Kalaw Elementary School
- Mabuhay Elementary School
- Malingon Elementary School
- Minap-os Elementary School
- Nadacpan Elementary School
- Naga Elementary School
- Oras East Central Elementary School
- Oras West Central Elementary School
- Pangudtan Elementary School
- Rizal Elementary School
- Sabang Elementary School
- San Eduardo Elementary School
- Saugan Elementary School
- Saurong Elementary School
- Sta. Monica Integrated School
- Tawagan Elementary School
- Trinidad Elementary School

=== Secondary ===
- Holy Cross Academy - Brgy. Butnga
- Nicasio M. Alvarez II Memorial National High School - Brgy. San Eduardo
- Nicasio M. Alvarez II Memorial National High School (Sta. Monica Annex) - Brgy. Sta. Monica
- Oras National Agro-Industrial School - Brgy. Cadi-an
- Oras National High School - Brgy. San Roque
- Oras National High School (Dao Annex) - Brgy. Dao
