= Lucy Torres-Gomez =

Filipino actress and politician

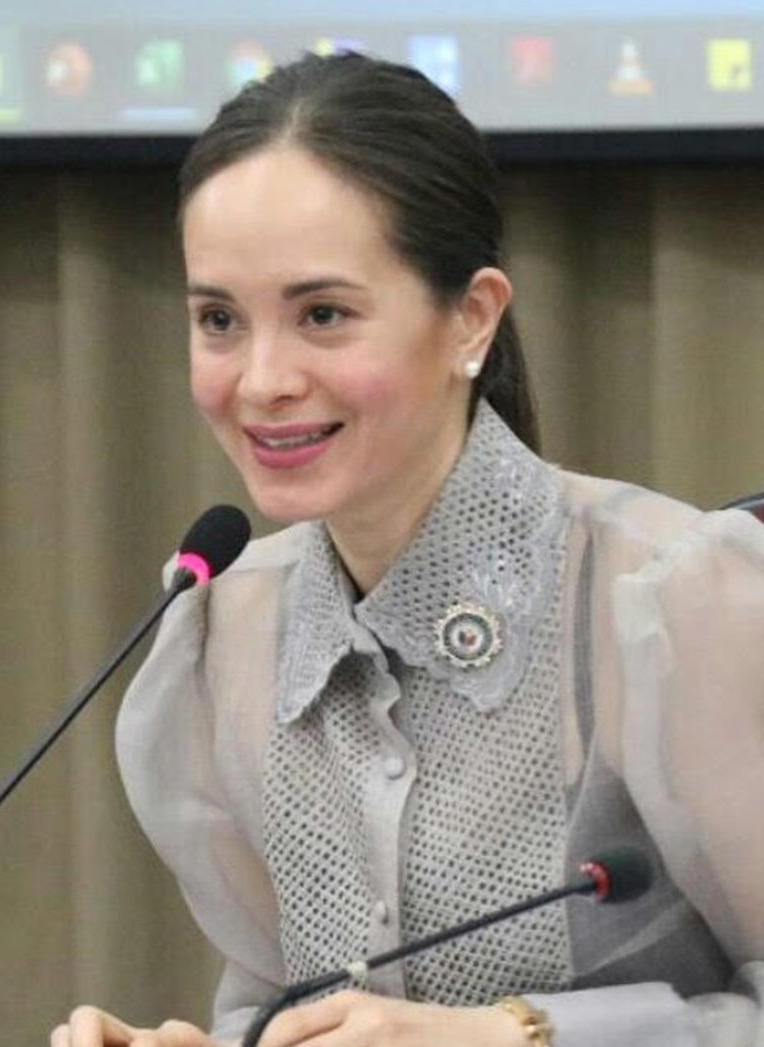
- Torres-Gomez in 2019

Mayor of Ormoc
- Incumbent
- Assumed office June 30, 2022
- Vice Mayor: Leo Locsin Sr. (2022-2025); Leo Locsin Jr. (2025-present)
- Preceded by: Richard Gomez

Member of the Philippine House of Representatives from Leyte’s 4th district
- In office June 30, 2013 – June 30, 2022
- Preceded by: Vacant
- Succeeded by: Richard Gomez
- In office June 30, 2010 – March 19, 2013
- Preceded by: Eufrocino Codilla Sr.
- Succeeded by: Vacant

Personal details
- Born: Lucy Marie Martinez Torres; December 11, 1974 (age 51) Ormoc City, Leyte, Philippines
- Party: PFP (2023–present)
- Other political affiliations: PDP–Laban (2016–2023); Liberal (2009–2016)
- Spouse: Richard Gomez (m. 1998)
- Children: 1 (Juliana)
- Education: University of the Philippines Visayas / University of the Philippines Cebu (BBM)
- Website: House of Representatives
- Military career
- Allegiance: Philippines
- Branch: Philippine Army; Army Reserve Command
- Service years: 2023–present
- Rank: Lieutenant Colonel

Lucy Marie Martinez Torres-Gomez (née Torres; December 11, 1974), is a Filipino actress and politician currently serving as the mayor of Ormoc since 2022. She previously served as the Representative for Leyte's 4th district from June 2010 to March 2013 and from June 2013 to June 2022.

She is married to fellow actor turned politician Richard Gomez, who currently serves as the representative for Leyte's 4th district.

== Early life and media career ==
Torres-Gomez was born on December 11, 1974, in Ormoc, Leyte, Philippines to Manuel "Manoling" Torres Jr. and Julie Martinez, the second of four children. She has an older sister and two younger brothers. For primary and secondary school, she attended the Benedictine founded Saint Peter's College in Ormoc. Torres-Gomez later attended the University of the Philippines Cebu (then a college of the University of the Philippines Visayas), from which she earned a Bachelor of Science degree in business management.

In 1993, Torres-Gomez shot a TV commercial for Lux Shampoo at Lake Caliraya, Laguna, where she met her future husband, Richard Gomez. Five years later in 1998, the two starred in the ABS-CBN television sitcom Richard Loves Lucy, and married that same year. Torres-Gomez has also hosted the TV5 reality dance competition show Shall We Dance? and the Q lifestyle show The Sweet Life, and endorses Philippine brands bench/, and Kashieca.

== Political career ==
Torres-Gomez was elected the Representative for Leyte's 4th legislative district as substitute candidate for her husband Richard Gomez on May 10, 2010. Gomez was disqualified by the Commission on Elections (COMELEC) due to his lack of one year residency in the district, a requirement of eligibility for office. On March 19, 2013, the Supreme Court, ruled on a protest filed by fellow congressional candidate Eufrocino Codilla Jr., ousting Torres-Gomez from office. The Courts said that she "did not validly substitute" her husband. Her ousting did not affect her re-election bid, and she regained her seat in May of that same year, beating incumbent Ormoc Mayor Eric Codilla. In May 2016, Torres-Gomez was again re-elected as representative, defeating Violeta Codilla.

As congresswoman, Torres-Gomez has principally authored over 100 bills and co-authored 35. She is the chairperson of the House Committee on Disaster Resilience, and the vice chairperson of committees on Tourism, and Women and Gender Equality, and the special committee on Creative Industry and Performing Arts. She voted against the Reproductive Health Bill in December 2012, explaining that the refusal of Albay Rep. Edcel Lagman, one of the bill's authors, to include a definition of when human life begins was the "core of my objection to the bill". Although she is a Marian devotee, Torres-Gomez voted in favor of a bill reimposing the death penalty in March 2017, reasoning that it was only limited to those who engaged in the illegal drug trade.

Torres-Gomez, together with husband Richard Gomez, was a member of the then-ruling Liberal Party during her early political career, but left in June 2016 to join the Partido Demokratiko Pilipino–Lakas ng Bayan (PDP–Laban) shortly after Rodrigo Duterte won the presidential election.

At the height of the COVID-19 pandemic in June 2020, Torres-Gomez expressed her support for the controversial Anti-Terrorism Act of 2020, stating that fear of the abuse of law is not a valid reason to reject needed legislation. The bill was signed into law as Republic Act No. 11479 on July 3, 2020. The law's constitutionality was challenged in the Supreme Court by multiple groups and were later declared unconstitutional some parts of thaw law.

=== Controversies ===
Torres-Gomez and her husband, representative Richard Gomez of Leyte's 4th district, have been alleged by Albuera, Leyte mayoral candidate Kerwin Espinosa to be connected to an assassination attempt on his life on April 10, 2025. In his claim, Espinosa stated that Ormoc police chief Reydante Ariza, a suspect in the incident, would have only answered to the Gomez couple, though he refrained from accusing them outright of instructing Ariza to target him. Gomez has denounced Espinosa's statement, claiming that the assassination attempt on Espinosa was "scripted", while Torres-Gomez would later file both a disqualification case and a criminal case against Espinosa for challenging her husband to a gun duel, which she deemed a threat against his life.

== Personal life ==
Torres-Gomez married actor and Leyte representative Richard Gomez on April 28, 1998 at the Saints Peter and Paul Parish Church in Ormoc, Leyte. They currently reside in Ormoc, and have one daughter, Juliana Ma. Beatrice (b. 2000), who graduated cum laude from the UP National College of Public Administration and Governance.

Torres-Gomez is Roman Catholic. She speaks Cebuano, English, and Tagalog.

In 2018, Torres-Gomez was named Most Stylish Woman by Philippine Tatler.

== Electoral history ==
Electoral history of Lucy Torres-Gomez
Year	Office	Party	Votes received				Result
Year	Office	Party	Total	%	P.	Swing	Result
2010	Representative (Leyte–4th)	Liberal	101,250	56.79%	1st	—N/a	Won
2013	Representative (Leyte–4th)	Liberal	106,291	53.29%	1st	-3.50	Won
2016	Representative (Leyte–4th)	Liberal	137,601	62.50%	1st	+9.21	Won
2019	Representative (Leyte–4th)	PDP–Laban	178,919	77.77%	1st	+15.27	Won
2022	Mayor of Ormoc	PDP–Laban	73,866	62.28%	1st	—N/a	Won
2025	Mayor of Ormoc	PFP	89,123	65.00%	1st	+2.72	Won

== Filmography ==
=== Film ===
Year	Title	Role
2011	Ang Panday 2	Ina Engkantada

=== Television ===
Year	Title	Role
1998–2001	Richard Loves Lucy	Lucy
2003–2004	All About You	Host
2004–2007	Bahay Mo Ba 'To?	Lucinda
2004–2005	Forever in My Heart	Herself
2005–2010	Shall We Dance?	Host
2007–2011	The Sweet Life	Host
2007	Mga Mata ni Anghelita	Birheng Maria
2010–2011	P.O.5	Host
2010–2013	Talentadong Pinoy	Judge
2013	Showbiz Police: Intriga Under Arrest	Host
2014	Celebrity Dance Battle	Host
