= Cooking with the Stars =

2012 Philippine television cooking show

- Title card
- Genre: Cooking show
- Directed by: Ogi Sugatan
- Presented by: Grace Lee
- Country of origin: Philippines
- Original language: Tagalog
- No. of episodes: 30

Production
- Executive producer: Leilani Feliciano-Sandoval
- Camera setup: Multiple-camera setup
- Running time: 10 minutes
- Production company: San Miguel Pure Foods Company Inc.

Original release
- Network: GMA Network
- Release: May 28 – August 3, 2012

Cooking with the Stars is a 2012 Philippine television cooking show broadcast by GMA Network. Hosted by Grace Lee, it premiered on May 28, 2012. The show concluded on August 4, 2012, with a total of 30 episodes.

== Ratings ==
According to AGB Nielsen Philippines' Mega Manila household television ratings, the pilot episode of Cooking with the Stars earned an 8.3% rating. The final episode scored a 10.2% rating.
