= Shall We Dance? (TV series) =

Philippine reality television program

- Genre: Reality competition
- Created by: ABC Development Corporation
- Directed by: Rich Ilustre
- Presented by: Lucy Torres; Victor Basa; Jon Avila
- Country of origin: Philippines
- Original language: Filipino
- No. of seasons: 10

Production
- Producer: Perci Intalan
- Running time: 60 minutes

Original release
- Network: ABC; TV5
- Release: November 6, 2005 – March 28, 2010

Related
- Eezy Dancing

Shall We Dance? is a Philippine television reality competition show broadcast by ABC/TV5. Hosted by Lucy Torres-Gomez, it aired from November 6, 2005 to March 28, 2010, and was replaced by My Darling Aswang. This is the first ever television program in the Philippines to use a steadicam.

== Format ==
The show features a ballroom dancing competition between three celebrities. Each celebrity is paired up with a dance instructor. The next portion of the show is a competition between three non-showbiz dance pairs. All performances are evaluated by a panel of three judges. The last portion of the show is a dance instructional by one of the judges, Ednah Ledesma. This portion features a step-by-step lesson by Ledesma of a ballroom dance. In 2008, the show was reformatted with a new title Shall We Dance: Search for the Dance Superstars.

== Hosts and judges ==
=== Main host ===
- Lucy Torres, dubbed "Asia's Dance Goddess"

=== Co-hosts ===
- Arnell Ignacio
- Jon Avila
- Victor Basa
- John Lapus
- Tuesday Vargas
- Wilma Doesnt

=== Judges ===
- Ednah Ledesma
- Regine Tolentino
- Douglas Nierras

=== Guest co-hosts ===
- Ryan Agoncillo
- Paolo Bediones

=== Former judges ===
- Audie Gemora

=== Former host ===
- Dominic Ochoa

== Awards and recognitions ==
=== 22nd PMPC Star Awards for Television ===
- Best Talent Search Program (2008)
- Best Talent Search Program Host – Lucy Torres-Gomez, Arnel Ignacio, and Dominic Ochoa (2008)

== See also ==
- List of TV5 (Philippine TV network) original programming
