= Sharee Ann Tan =

Filipino politician

The Honorable Sharee Ann Tan
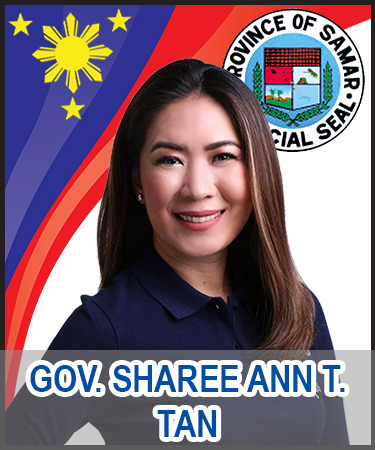

22nd Governor of Samar
- Incumbent
- Assumed office June 30, 2022
- Vice Governor: Arnold Tan
- Preceded by: Reynolds Michael Tan
- In office June 30, 2010 – June 30, 2019
- Vice Governor: Stephen James Tan
- Preceded by: Milagrosa Tan
- Succeeded by: Milagrosa Tan

Member of the Philippine House of Representatives from Samar's 2nd District
- In office June 30, 2019 – June 30, 2022
- Preceded by: Milagrosa Tan
- Succeeded by: Reynolds Michael Tan
- In office June 30, 2007 – June 30, 2010
- Preceded by: Catalino Figueroa
- Succeeded by: Milagrosa Tan

Personal details
- Born: Sharee Ann Tee Tan; May 11, 1982 (age 44) Cebu City, Philippines
- Party: Nacionalista (2021–present)
- Other political affiliations: Lakas (2007–2012); NPC (2012–2018); PDP–Laban (2018–2021)
- Spouse: Richard Delos Santos
- Children: 3
- Education: University of San Carlos (BS)
- Occupation: Pharmacist, politician

Sharee Ann Tee Tan-delos Santos (born May 11, 1982) is a Filipino politician. She currently serves as Governor of Samar since 2022, a position she previously held from 2010 to 2019.

== Early life ==
Tan was born on May 11, 1982, to Ricardo Tan and Milagrosa Tee. She is a sister to Angelie, Stephen James ("Jimboy") and Reynolds Michael.

She earned a pharmacy degree at University of San Carlos in Cebu City.

== Political career ==
Sharee Ann Tan holds the distinction of being the youngest person ever elected to the House of Representatives of the Philippines. She was elected on May 14, 2007, just three days after her 25th birthday on May 11, the minimum age required by law to become a member of Congress. Representing the 2nd District of Samar, her election made history and marked the beginning of her notable career in public service.

in 2007, Tan first served as representative of Samar's 2nd congressional district from 2007 to 2010. At the age of 25, she was the youngest member of the House of Representatives during the 14th Congress.

In 2010, Tan ran and won as governor of Samar, to which she held on to her seat in the 2013 and 2016 elections.

In 2019, Tan ran and reclaimed her post as Samar's 2nd district representative, where she voted to reject the renewal of the then-recently expiring franchise of broadcast giant ABS-CBN Corporation.

In the 2022 local elections, she ran, won, and reclaimed her post as governor of Samar, switching places with her brother Reynolds Michael.

== Personal life ==
She is married to businessman Richard de los Santos, and have three children together.

Political offices
Preceded by Reynolds Michael Tan	Governor of Samar; 2022–present 2010–2019	Incumbent
Preceded by Milagrosa Tan	Governor of Samar; 2022–present 2010–2019	Succeeded by Milagrosa Tan
House of Representatives of the Philippines
Preceded by Milagrosa Tan	Member of the House of Representatives from Samar's 2nd district 2019–2022	Succeeded by Reynolds Michael Tan
Preceded by Catalino Figueroa	Member of the House of Representatives from Samar's 2nd district 2007–2010	Succeeded by Milagrosa Tan
