= Alma Uy-Lampasa =

Filipino lawyer and politician known as the Iron Lady of Samar

The Honourable Alma Uy-Lampasa LLB
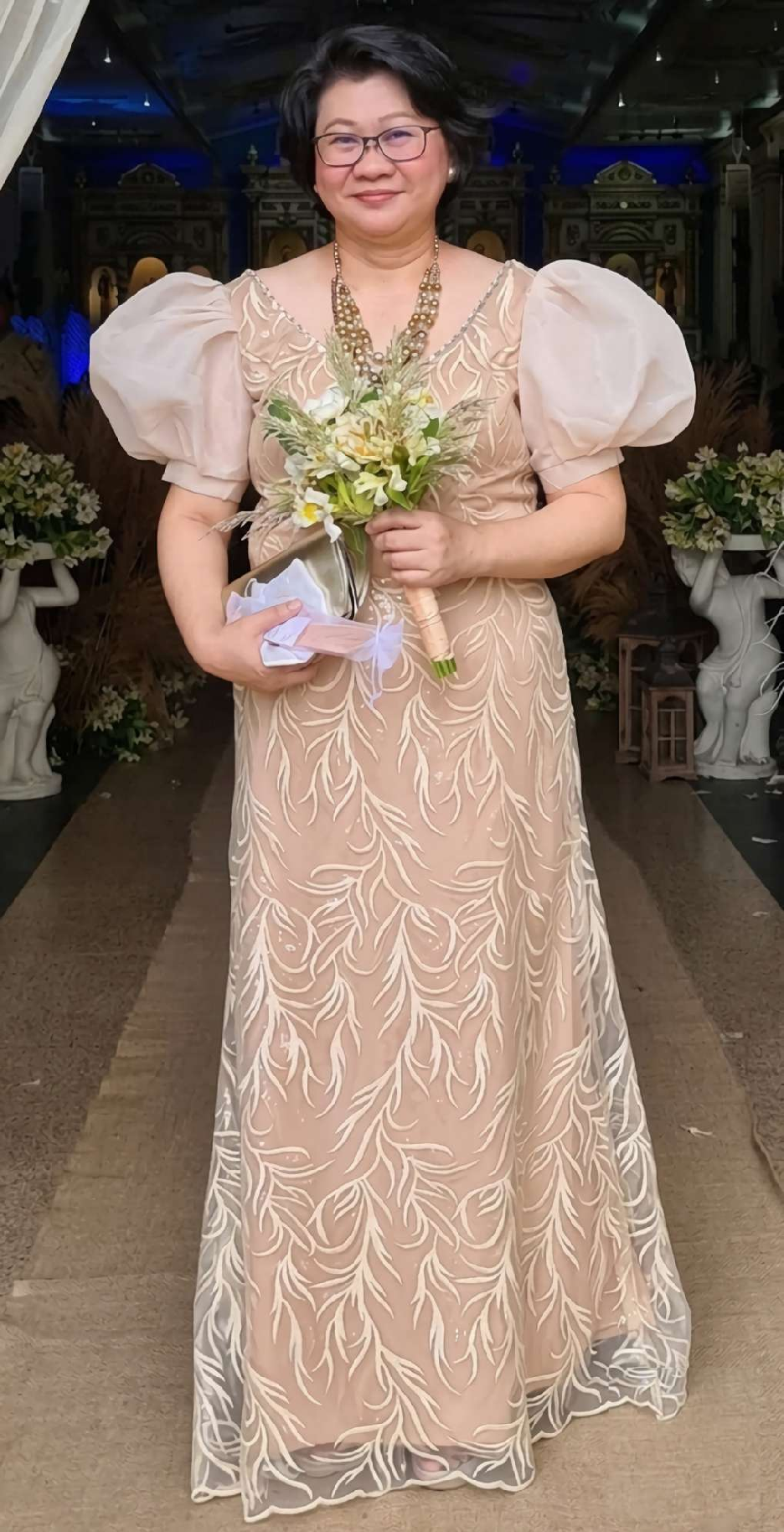

Member of the Samar Provincial Board from the 2nd district
- In office June 30, 2013 – June 30, 2019

Member of Catbalogan City Council
- In office June 30, 2019 – June 30, 2022

Personal details
- Born: Alma Rafon Uy; August 1, 1971 (age 55) Catbalogan City, Philippines
- Party: Independent (2018–present)
- Other political affiliations: Liberal (2013–2018)
- Spouse: Cicero Lampasa
- Education: University of San Carlos (AB); San Beda University (LL.B)
- Occupation: Politician, Educator, Judge
- Profession: Lawyer

Alma Rafon Uy-Lampasa (born August 1, 1971) is a distinguished Filipino lawyer, educator, jurist, and public servant who served as Provincial Board Member representing the 2nd Legislative District of Samar.

== Early life ==
Uy was born in Catbalogan, Samar, to Antonio Go Uy and Gloria Rafon. She was raised by her mother, Gloria Rafon, who worked as a waitress at the Legarda Refreshment Parlor. Gloria Rafon later married Antonio Go Uy, the son of the establishment's owner, See Ho Uy Pet Ten.

Uy studied Political Science at the University of San Carlos and earned her Bachelor of Laws degree from San Beda University.

She is the wife of Judge Cicero Lampasa, the Presiding Judge of Regional Trial Court-Branch 27 in Catbalogan.

== Career ==
=== Legal career ===
Uy became the Presiding Judge of Municipal Circuit Trial Courts (MCTC) of municipalities of Daram, Zumarraga and Motiong and Assisting Judge of the MTCC of Calbayog.

=== Political career ===
She served as a board member of the Sangguniang Panlalawigan under the 2nd legislative district of Samar province. In the 2019 local election, she ran for the position of councilor of city of Catbalogan and won.

=== Academic career ===
Uy is a part-time instructor at Saint Mary's College of Catbalogan handling law-related subjects.

== Controversies ==
=== Violation of notarial practice ===
Uy was accused by Rolando Ko of violating the Rules of Notarial Practice and breaching the Code of Professional Responsibility. The case was filed and reached the Supreme Court of the Philippines. She was found guilty and was suspended of practicing law for six months. Her notarial commission was revoked, and she was prohibited from being commissioned as a notary public for two years.

=== Politically motivated ambush ===
In July 2014, Uy's car was ambushed in Jiabong, Samar; she survived. She believed that politics was behind the incident.

=== 'Bullying' accusation ===
Uy accused Samar's Sangguniang Panlalawigan Presiding Chair then Vice Governor Stephen James "Jimboy" Tan of bullying by prohibited her from asking questions and raising some points during their regular sessions.

=== Samar capitol 800 million loan issue ===
Uy was the lone board member of Samar province who opposed the passage of a "borrowing ordinance" which gives Ex-Governor now Congresswoman Sharee Ann Tan blanket authority to enter into a contract of loan with the Development Bank of the Philippines (DBP) or Land Bank of the Philippines (LBP) for the said amount. The petition filed by her was junked by the Regional Trial Court (RTC) Branch 29.
