= Samar Provincial Board =

Legislative body of the province of Samar, Philippines

Samar Provincial Board Sangguniang Panlalawigan ng Samar

Type
- Type: Unicameral
- Term limits: 3 terms (9 years)

Leadership
- Presiding Officer: Arnold V. Tan, PFP since June 30, 2022

Structure
- Seats: 13 board members 1 ex officio presiding officer
- Political groups: Nacionalista (11) Nonpartisan (2)
- Length of term: 3 years
- Authority: Local Government Code of the Philippines

Elections
- Voting system: Multiple non-transferable vote (regular members); Indirect election (ex officio members)
- Last election: May 12, 2025
- Next election: May 15, 2028

Meeting place
- Samar Capitol Building, Catbalogan

The Samar Provincial Board is the Sangguniang Panlalawigan (provincial legislature) of the Philippine province of Samar, formerly "Western Samar".

The members are elected via plurality-at-large voting: the province is divided into two districts, each having five seats. A voter votes up to five names, with the top five candidates per district being elected. The vice governor is the ex officio presiding officer, and only votes to break ties. The vice governor is elected via the plurality voting system province-wide.

The districts used in appropriation of members is coextensive with the legislative districts of Samar.

Aside from the regular members, the board also includes the provincial federation presidents of the Liga ng mga Barangay (ABC, from its old name "Association of Barangay Captains"), the Sangguniang Kabataan (SK, youth councils) and the Philippine Councilors League (PCL).

== Apportionment ==
Elections	Seats per district		Ex officio seats	Total seats
Elections	1st	2nd	Ex officio seats	Total seats
1987–present	5	5	3	13

== List of members ==
=== Current members ===
These are the members after the 2025 local elections and 2023 barangay and SK elections:

- Vice Governor: Arnold V. Tan (PFP)

Seat	Board member	Party	Start of term	End of term
1st district	Edward James B. Clemens	Nacionalista	June 30, 2022	June 30, 2028
1st district	Abbie Joy A. Irigon	Nacionalista	June 30, 2025	June 30, 2028
1st district	Dawn Marie D. Acosta	Nacionalista	June 30, 2025	June 30, 2028
1st district	Emelly D. Olaje	Nacionalista	June 30, 2022	June 30, 2028
1st district	Anecio R. Guades	Nacionalista	June 30, 2022	June 30, 2028
2nd district	Beethoven M. Bermejo	Nacionalista	June 30, 2022	June 30, 2028
2nd district	Yolanda T. Tan	Nacionalista	June 30, 2025	June 30, 2028
2nd district	Ma. Elpa E. De Jesus	Nacionalista	June 30, 2022	June 30, 2028
2nd district	Luzviminda L. Nacario	Nacionalista	June 30, 2019	June 30, 2028
2nd district	Jade Kie R. Tiu	Nacionalista	June 30, 2025	June 30, 2028
ABC	Ruby Delector	Nonpartisan	November 30, 2023	December 31, 2025
PCL	Rita Rama	Nacionalista	June 30, 2025	June 30, 2028
SK	Ingrid Cabarriban	Nonpartisan	November 30, 2023	December 31, 2025

=== Former members ===
==== Vice governor ====
Election year	Name	Party	Ref.
2013	Stephen James T. Tan	Nacionalista	
2016	Stephen James T. Tan	Nacionalista	
2019	Reynolds Michael Tan (Note: Governor Milagrosa Tan died in office on November 30, 2019, and Reynolds Michael Tan assumed the governorship in 2 December 2019.)	PDP–Laban	
2019	Angelica S. Gomez-Teodoro	Liberal	
2022	Arnold V. Tan	Nacionalista	
2025	Arnold V. Tan	PFP	

==== 1st district ====
Election year	Member (party)	Member (party)	Member (party)	Member (party)	Member (party)	Ref.
2013	Charlito L. Coñejos	Salvador T. Cruz	Erdie L. delos Santos	Lolita M. Daguman	Alan A. Diomangay	
2016	Julius A. Mancol (Liberal)	Miguelito "Mike" G. Ayong (Liberal)	Alfredo "Fred" B. Serrano (Liberal)	Regina "Ina" B. Rabuya (Liberal)	Nancy Rosales (Nacionalista)	
2019	Angelica S. Gomez-Teodoro (Liberal) (Note: Angelica Gomez-Teodoro assumes the vice gubernatorial seat in 2 December 2019.)	Regina "Ina" B. Rabuya (Liberal)	Julius A. Mancol (Liberal)	Miguelito "Mike" G. Ayong (Liberal)	Alfredo "Fred" B. Serrano (Liberal)	
2022	Alan A. Diomangaya (Nacionalista)	Edward James B. Clemens (Nacionalista)	Emmelly D. Olaja (Nacionalista)	Lyda C. delos Reyes (Nacionalista)	Anecio R. Guades (Nacionalista)	
2025	Edward James B. Clemens (Nacionalista)	Abbie Joy A. Irigon (Nacionalista)	Dawn Marie D. Acosta (Nacionalista)	Emelly D. Olaje (Nacionalista)	Anecio R. Guades (Nacionalista)	

==== 2nd district ====
Election year	Member (party)	Member (party)	Member (party)	Member (party)	Member (party)	Ref.
2013	Alma U. Lampasa	Arthur Vaughn M. Zosa	Lee M. Zosa	Luzviminda "Bebot" L. Nacario	Alvin D. Abejuela	
2016	Alvin D. Abejuena (UNA)	Fe T. Arcales (NPC)	Lee M. Zosa (Independent)	Carlo R. Latorre (NPC)	Alma U. Lampasa (Liberal)	
2019	Lee M. Zosa (PDP-Laban)	Alvin D. Abejuena (UNA)	Fe T. Arcales (PDP-Laban)	Luzviminda "Bebot" L. Nacario (PDP-Laban)	Carlo R. Latorre (PDP-Laban)	
2022	Fe T. Arcales (Nacionalista)	Luzviminda L. Nacario (Nacionalista)	Beethoven M. Bermejo (Nacionalista)	Ma. Elpa E. de Jesus (Nacionalista)	Nanette S. Jasmin (Nacionalista)	
2025	Beethoven M. Bermejo (Nacionalista)	Yolanda T. Tan (Nacionalista)	Ma. Elpa E. De Jesus (Nacionalista)	Luzviminda L. Nacario (Nacionalista)	Jade Kie R. Tiu (Nacionalista)	

==== Philippine Councilors League president ====
Election year	Name	Party	Local council	Ref.
2013	Beethoven M. Bermejo		Catbalogan	
2019	Beethoven M. Bermejo	PDP–Laban	Catbalogan	
2022	Minda D. Pasacas	Nacionalista	Calbayog	

==== Liga ng mga Barangay president ====
Election year	Name	Municipality/City	Ref.
2013	Carlo R. Latorre	Villareal	
2018	Ma. Elpa de Jesus	Catbalogan	
2023	Ruby Delector	Gandara	

==== Sangguniang Kabataan president ====
Election year	Name	Municipality/City	Ref.
2013	none		
2018	Christian Bernard Onate	Catbalogan	
2023	Ingrid C. Cabarriban	Paranas	
