= Milagrosa Tan =

Filipina politician (1958–2019)

The Honorable Milagrosa "Mila" Tan
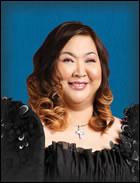
- Official portrait, 2013

21st Governor of Samar
- In office June 30, 2019 – November 30, 2019
- Vice Governor: Reynolds Michael Tan
- Preceded by: Sharee Ann Tan
- Succeeded by: Reynolds Michael Tan
- In office June 30, 2001 – June 30, 2010
- Vice Governor: Ernesto Arcales (2001–2004); Jesus Redaja (2004–2010)
- Preceded by: Jose Roño
- Succeeded by: Sharee Ann Tan

Member of the Philippine House of Representatives from Samar's 2nd District
- In office June 30, 2010 – June 30, 2019
- Preceded by: Sharee Ann Tan
- Succeeded by: Sharee Ann Tan

Member of the Samar Provincial Board from the 2nd District
- In office June 30, 1998 – June 30, 2001

Personal details
- Born: Milagrosa Tee; February 25, 1958 Palompon, Leyte, Philippines
- Died: November 30, 2019 (aged 61) Taguig, Philippines
- Party: PDP–Laban (2016–2019)
- Other political affiliations: NPC (2010–2016); Lakas–CMD (2008–2010); KAMPI (2007–2008); Liberal (2004–2007); PMP (2001–2004)
- Spouse: Ricardo Tan
- Children: 4, including Sharee Ann, Stephen James and Reynolds Michael

Milagrosa Tee Tan (February 25, 1958 – November 30, 2019) was a Filipina politician from the province of Samar in the Philippines. She was from the town of Palompon in the province of Leyte and married a Catbaloganon. She was the first female governor of the province who served from 2001 to 2010 and was re-elected in 2019 following the end of term of her daughter, Sharee Ann Tan. She also served as a member of the House of Representatives of the Philippines.

== Suspension as governor ==
On 23 November 2018, the Sandiganbayan anti-graft court directed the offices of House Speaker Gloria Macapagal Arroyo and Interior and Local Government Secretary Eduardo Año to implement a 90-day preventive suspension of Samar Representative Milagrosa Tan. Tan was under trial for graft and malversation of public funds with the anomalous purchase of ₱16.1 million in emergency supplies without public bidding when she was the governor of Samar in 2001. The anomalous transactions involved the purchase of ₱3.9 million worth of medicines, ₱1.6 million worth of electric fans, and ₱10.6 million worth of assorted goods and rice. Tan was convicted on 1 March 2019 and was thus disqualified from holding public office.

== Personal life and death ==
Mila Tan was married to Ricardo Tan, and had four children together: Sharee Ann, Angelie, Stephen James, and Reynolds Michael.

She died at a hospital in Taguig after going into cardiac arrest on 30 November 2019.

== Electoral history ==
Electoral history of Milagrosa Tan
Year	Office	Party	Votes received				Result
Year	Office	Party	Total	%	P.	Swing	Result
2001	Governor of Samar	PMP	106,429	49.42%	1st	—N/a	Won
2004	Governor of Samar	Liberal	131,761	55.11%	1st	+5.59	Won
2007	Governor of Samar	KAMPI	136,570	62.44%	1st	+7.33	Won
2019	Governor of Samar	PDP–Laban	211,764	50.92%	1st	-11.52	Won
2010	Representative (Samar–2nd)	Lakas–Kampi	58,168	36.99%	1st	—N/a	Won
2013	Representative (Samar–2nd)	NPC	68,137	43.77%	1st	+6.78	Won
2016	Representative (Samar–2nd)	NPC	137,248	69.16%	1st	+25.39	Won

Political offices
Preceded by Sharee Ann Tan	Governor of Samar; 2019	Succeeded by Reynolds Michael Tan
Preceded by Jose Roño	Governor of Samar; 2001–2010	Succeeded by Sharee Ann Tan
House of Representatives of the Philippines
Preceded by Sharee Ann Tan	Member of the House of Representatives from Samar's 2nd district 2010–2019	Succeeded by Sharee Ann Tan
