= Dolores, Eastern Samar =

Municipality in Eastern Samar, Philippines

Dolores Paric
- Municipality
- Municipality of Dolores
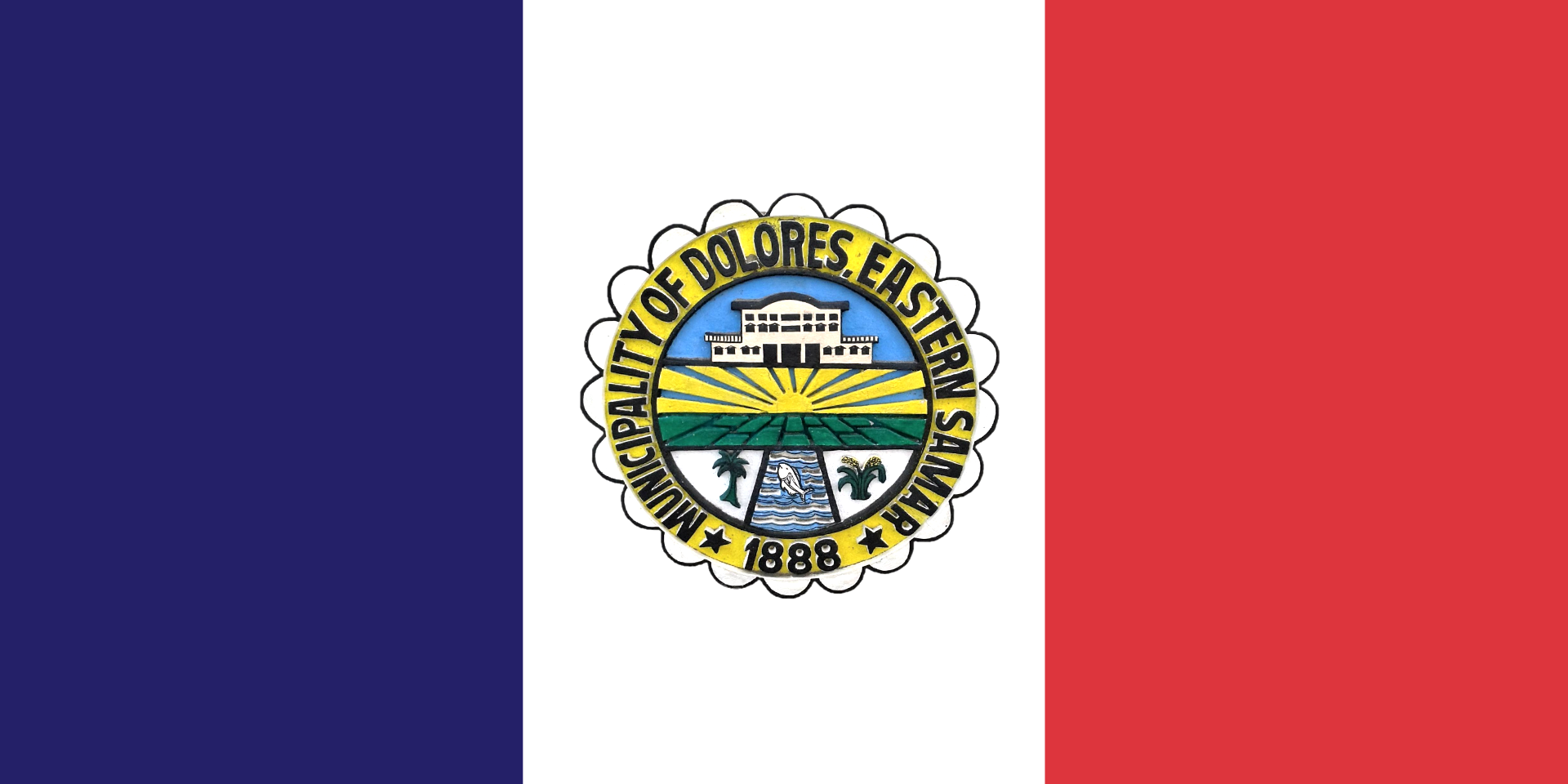
- Flag
- Motto: Sirak Dolores!
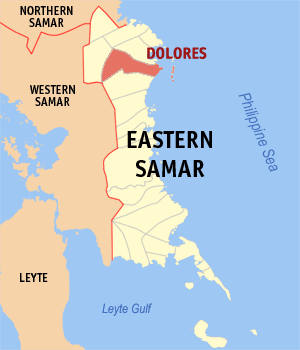
- Map of Eastern Samar with Dolores highlighted
- Interactive map of Dolores
- Location within the Philippines
- Coordinates: 12°02′16″N 125°28′58″E
- Country: Philippines
- Region: Eastern Visayas
- Province: Eastern Samar
- District: Lone district
- Barangays: 46 (see Barangays)

Government
  - Type: Sangguniang Bayan
  - Mayor: Zaldy R. Caperso
  - Vice Mayor: Shonny Niño R. Carpeso
  - Representative: Christopher Sheen P. Gonzales
  - Councilors: List: • Helen O. Espeso; • Jigo Val Santiago; • Cyril C. Abobo; • Mae C. Almazan; • Jorald Rivera; • Pedro O. Lazzara; • Marife Robin; • Angel Estil; DILG Masterlist of Officials
  - Electorate: 32,402 voters (2025)

Area
  - Total: 308.58 km^{2} (119.14 sq mi)
- Elevation: 8.0 m (26.2 ft)
- Highest elevation: 102 m (335 ft)
- Lowest elevation: 0 m (0 ft)

Population (2024 census)
  - Total: 45,314
  - Density: 146.85/km^{2} (380.33/sq mi)
  - Households: 10,542
- Demonym: Doloresnon

Economy
  - Income class: 1st municipal income class
  - Poverty incidence: 39.45% (2023)
  - Revenue: ₱ 252.7 million (2024)
  - Assets: ₱ 758.4 million (2024)
  - Expenditure: ₱ 218.3 million (2024)
  - Liabilities: ₱ 245.9 million (2024)

Service provider
  - Electricity: Eastern Samar Electric Cooperative (ESAMELCO)
- Time zone: UTC+8 (PST)
- ZIP code: 6817
- PSGC: 0802606000
- IDD : area code: +63 (0)55
- Native languages: Waray; Tagalog

Dolores (IPA: [ˌdoˈlorɛs]), officially the Municipality of Dolores (Waray: Bungto han Dolores; Tagalog: Bayan ng Dolores), is a municipality in the province of Eastern Samar, Philippines. According to the 2024 census, it has a population of 45,314 people.

Dolores is a coastal town bounded on the east by the Pacific Ocean in the Eastern Visayas region of the Philippines. It has many beaches and small islands. Most of the populace speak and understand English.

== History ==
In 1948, the barrios of Can-avid, Carolina, Barok, Cansangaya, Mabuhay, Camantang, Canilay, Pandol and Balagon, formerly part of this town, were separated into the municipality of Can-avid, Eastern Samar, by virtue of Republic Act No. 264.

== Geography ==
=== Barangays ===
Dolores is politically subdivided into 46 barangays. Each barangay consists of puroks and some have sitios.

- Aroganga
- Bonghon
- Buenavista
- Cabago-an
- Caglao-an
- Cagtabon
- Dampigan
- Dapdap
- Del Pilar
- Denigpian
- Gap-ang
- Japitan
- Jicontol
- Hilabaan
- Hinolaso
- Libertad
- Magongbong
- Magsaysay
- Malaintos
- Malobago
- Osmeña
- Barangay 1 (Poblacion)
- Barangay 2 (Poblacion)
- Barangay 3 (Poblacion)
- Barangay 4 (Poblacion)
- Barangay 5 (Poblacion)
- Barangay 6 (Poblacion)
- Barangay 7 (Poblacion)
- Barangay 8 (Poblacion)
- Barangay 9 (Poblacion)
- Barangay 10 (Poblacion)
- Barangay 11 (Poblacion)
- Barangay 12 (Poblacion)
- Barangay 13 (Poblacion)
- Barangay 14 (Poblacion)
- Barangay 15 (Poblacion)
- Rizal
- San Isidro (Malabag)
- San Pascual
- San Roque
- San Vicente
- Santa Cruz
- Santo Niño
- Tanauan
- Villahermosa
- Tikling

=== Climate ===
Climate data for Dolores, Eastern Samar
| Month | Jan | Feb | Mar | Apr | May | Jun | Jul | Aug | Sep | Oct | Nov | Dec | Year |
|---|---|---|---|---|---|---|---|---|---|---|---|---|---|
| Mean daily maximum °C (°F) | 27 (81) | 27 (81) | 28 (82) | 29 (84) | 30 (86) | 30 (86) | 29 (84) | 29 (84) | 29 (84) | 29 (84) | 28 (82) | 28 (82) | 29 (83) |
| Mean daily minimum °C (°F) | 22 (72) | 22 (72) | 22 (72) | 23 (73) | 24 (75) | 24 (75) | 24 (75) | 24 (75) | 24 (75) | 24 (75) | 23 (73) | 23 (73) | 23 (74) |
| Average precipitation mm (inches) | 97 (3.8) | 64 (2.5) | 69 (2.7) | 58 (2.3) | 98 (3.9) | 161 (6.3) | 167 (6.6) | 140 (5.5) | 158 (6.2) | 171 (6.7) | 169 (6.7) | 154 (6.1) | 1,506 (59.3) |
| Average rainy days | 17.1 | 13.4 | 14.8 | 15.2 | 21.1 | 25.2 | 26.8 | 25.4 | 25.5 | 26.5 | 23.0 | 20.3 | 254.3 |
Source: Meteoblue

== Demographics ==
Population census of Dolores
| Year | Pop. | ±% p.a. |
|---|---|---|
| 1903 | 4,830 | — |
| 1918 | 6,047 | +1.51% |
| 1939 | 13,122 | +3.76% |
| 1948 | 13,124 | +0.00% |
| 1960 | 16,055 | +1.69% |
| 1970 | 22,730 | +3.53% |
| 1975 | 21,119 | −1.46% |
| 1980 | 26,949 | +4.99% |
| 1990 | 30,570 | +1.27% |
| 1995 | 34,272 | +2.16% |
| 2000 | 32,812 | −0.93% |
| 2007 | 34,522 | +0.70% |
| 2010 | 37,912 | +3.47% |
| 2015 | 42,866 | +2.37% |
| 2020 | 44,626 | +0.85% |
| 2024 | 45,314 | +0.37% |
Source: Philippine Statistics Authority

The population of Dolores in the 2024 census was 45,314 people, with a density of 150 inhabitants per square kilometre or 390 inhabitants per square mile.

=== Language ===
The languages spoken are Waray-Waray, and Cebuano, locals are also literate in both English and Filipino.

=== Religion ===
Most of the people are predominantly Roman Catholic, and some belonging to other Christian denominations, as well as minority religious sects. There is also a significant population of Muslim converts here known as Balik Islam.

== Economy ==
Poverty incidence of Dolores (%)

Source: Philippine Statistics Authority

Major sources of livelihood in Dolores include farming and fishing, according to the Department of the Interior and Local Government (DILG) Region VIII.

== Transportation ==
Pedicabs and tricycles are the means of transportation within the town, while multi-cabs, jeepneys, and vans are the means of transportation to neighboring and distant towns within the province. Several bus companies are also operating from the town going to Manila or Tacloban and vice versa.

Dolores has the abandoned Picardo Airport. The airport has an unusable short runway.

== Education ==
Dolores has 32 public elementary schools, 4 public high schools with 1 Tech-Voc (Technical and Vocational) high school, and 1 private college.

=== Elementary schools ===
- Dolores Central Elementary School
- Aroganga Elementary School
- Magongbong Elementary School
- Buenavista Elementary School
- Cabago-an Elementary School
- Caglao-an Elementary School
- Cagtabon Elementary School
- Dampigan Elementary School
- Dapdap Central Elementary School
- Del Pilar Elementary School
- Denigpian Elementary School
- Gap-ang Elementary School
- Japitan Elementary School
- Jicontol Elementary School
- Hilabaan Elementary School
- Hinolaso Elementary School
- Libertad Elementary School
- Magasaysay Elementary School
- Malabago Elementary School
- Osmeña Elementary School
- Rizal Elementary School
- San Isidro (Malabag) Elementary School
- San Pascual Elementary School
- San Roque Elementary School
- San Vicente Elementary School
- Santa Cruz Elementary School
- Santo Niño Elementary School
- Tanauan Elementary School
- Villahermosa Elementary School
- Bonghon Elementary School
- Malaintos Elementary School
- Tikling Elementary School

=== Secondary schools ===
- Dolores National High School
- Hilabaan National High School
- Hinolaso National High School
- Caglao-an National High School
- Dapdap National Technical and Vocational High School

=== Colleges/Universities ===
- Mater Divinae Gratiae College
