= List of beaches in the Philippines =

Beach tourism is a major contributor to the economy of the Philippines, owing to the country's tropical climate and geography of more than 7,000 islands. The following is a list of notable beaches in the country sorted by province.

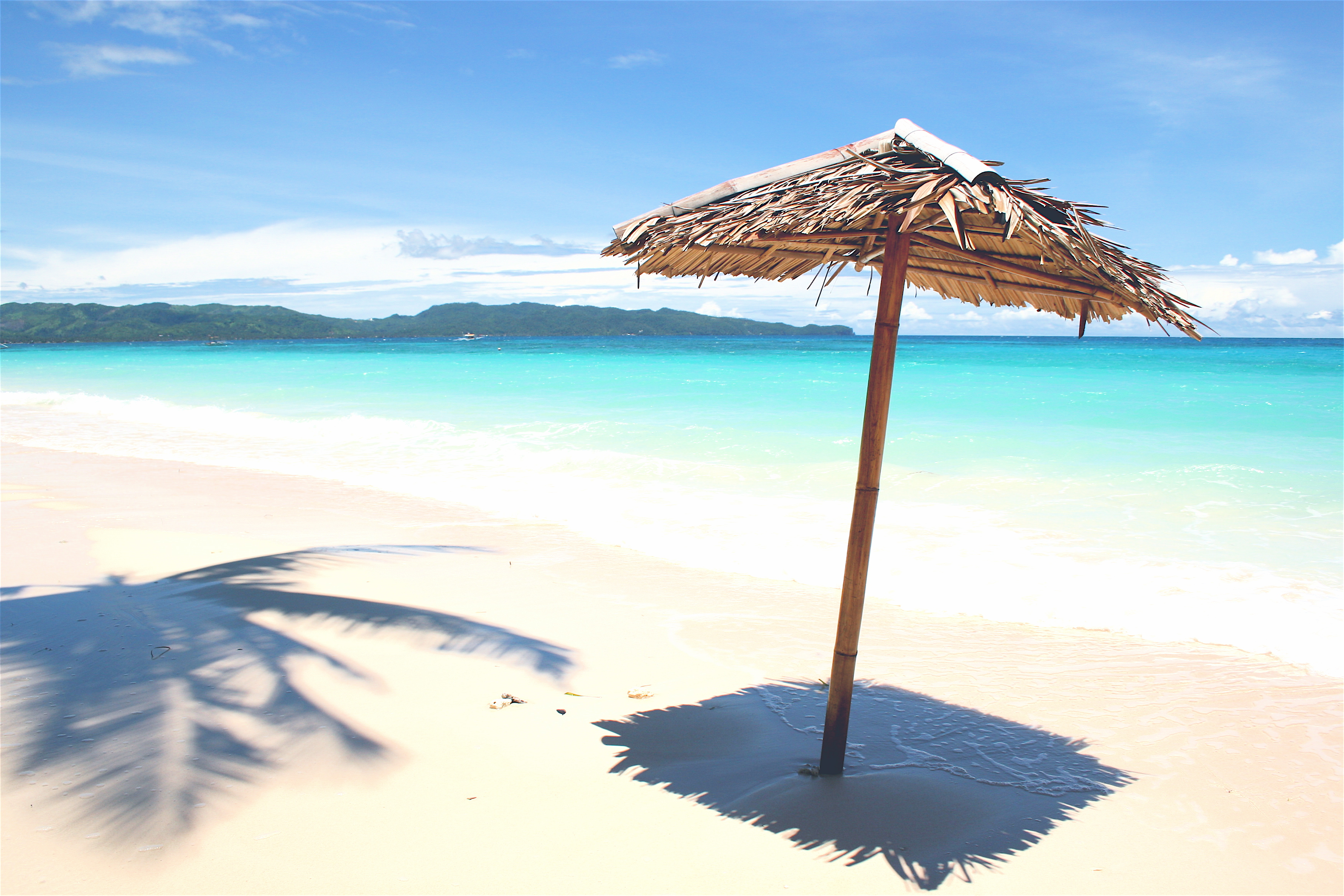
White Beach in Boracay Island, Aklan

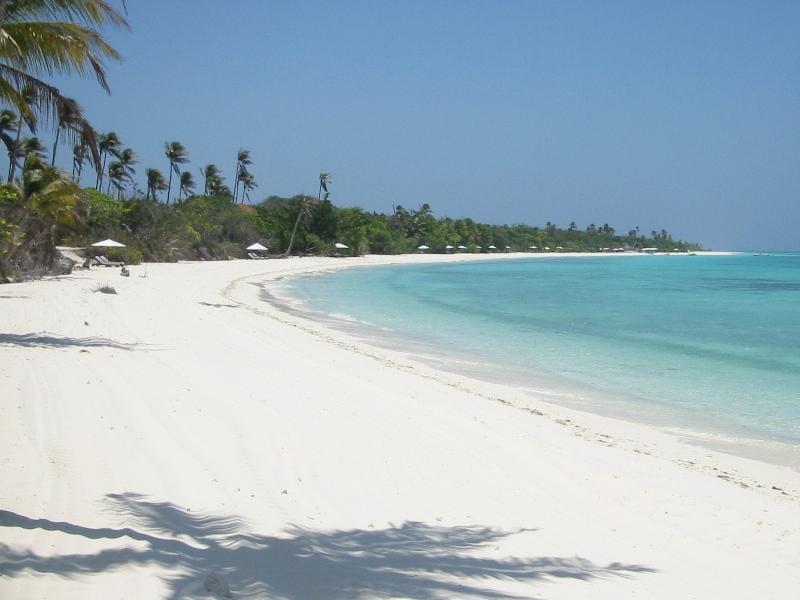
Pamalican Island Main Beach in Cuyo, Palawan

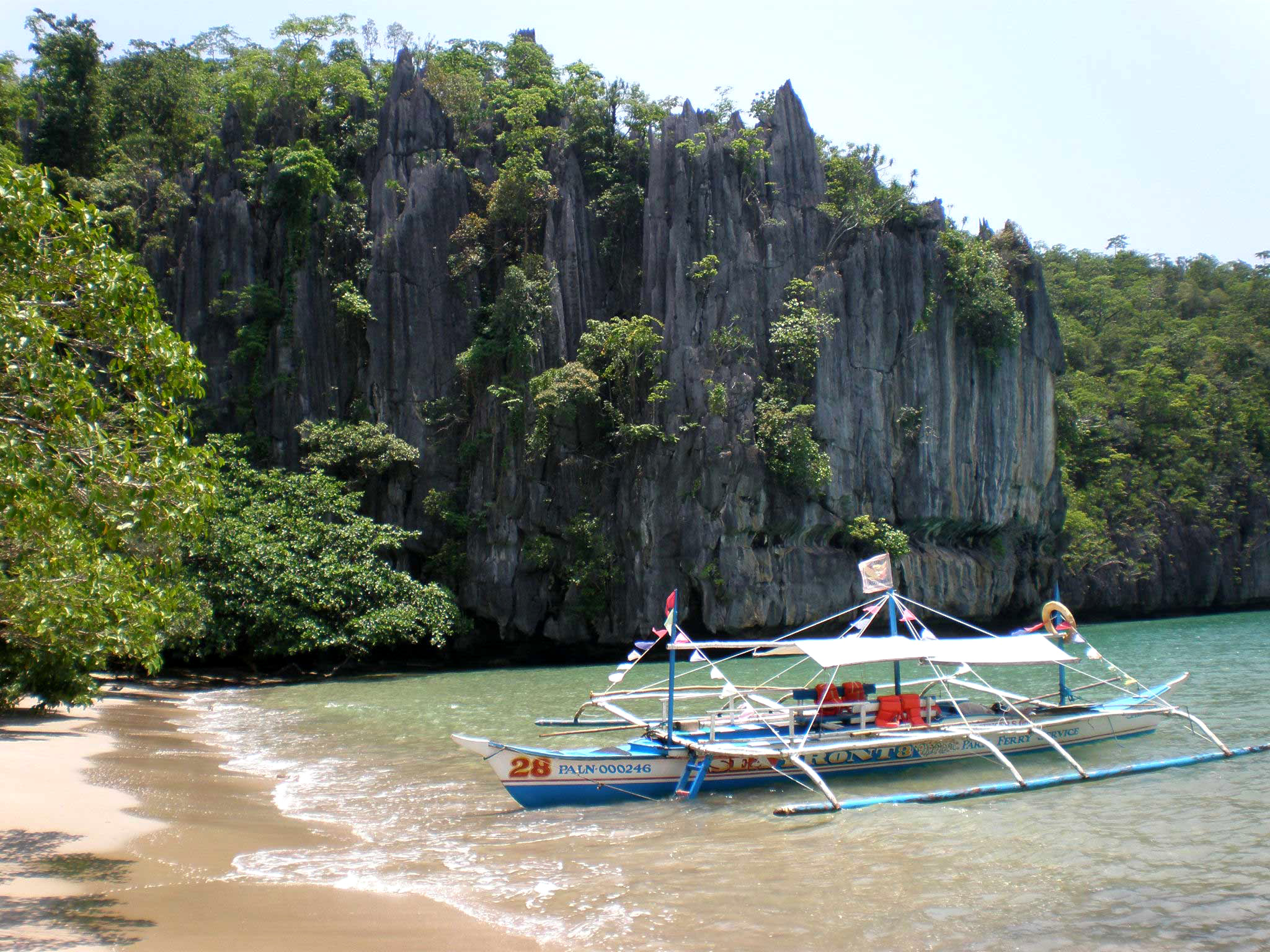
Sabang Beach in Puerto Princesa, Palawan

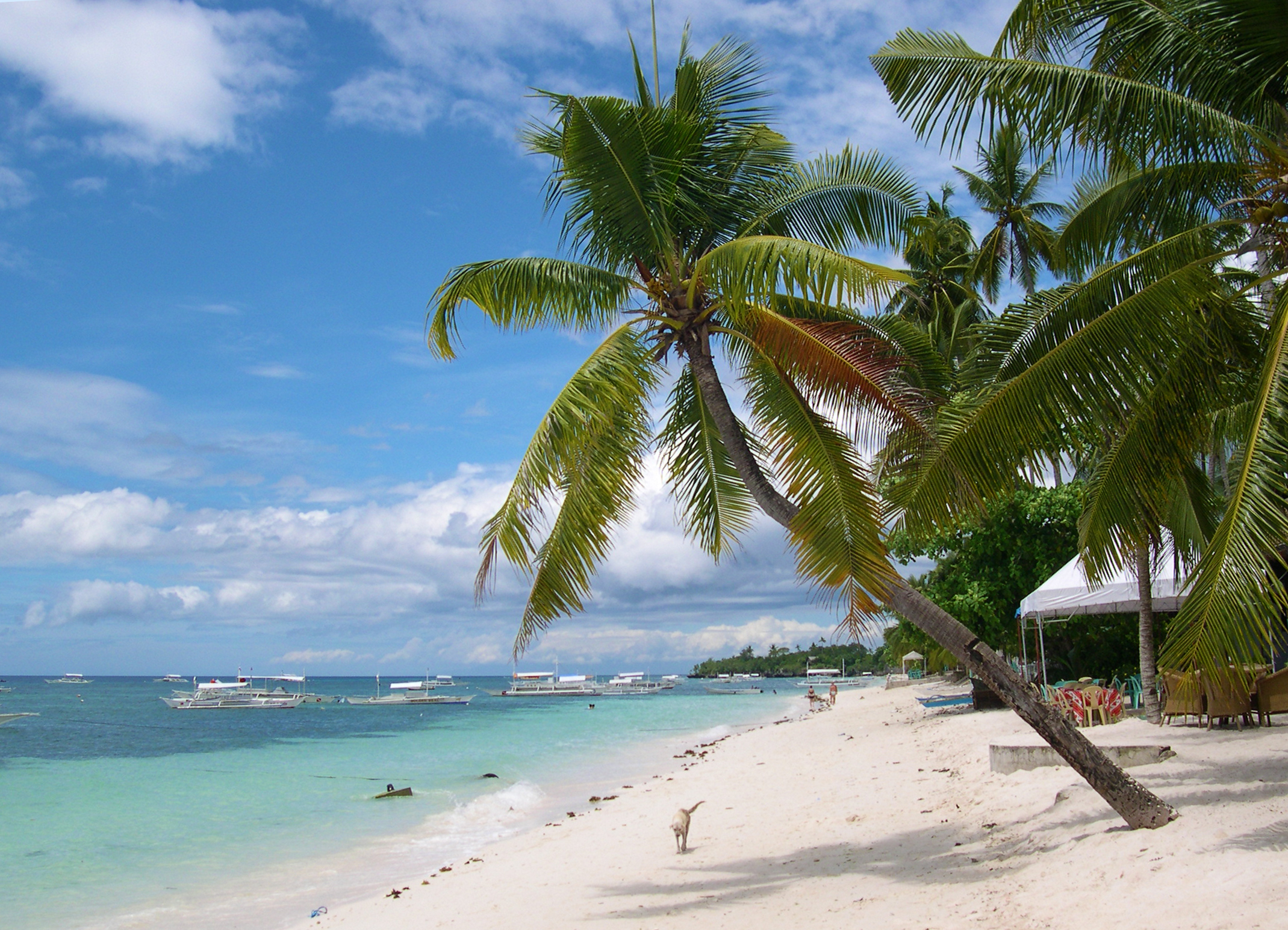
Alona Beach in Panglao Island, Bohol

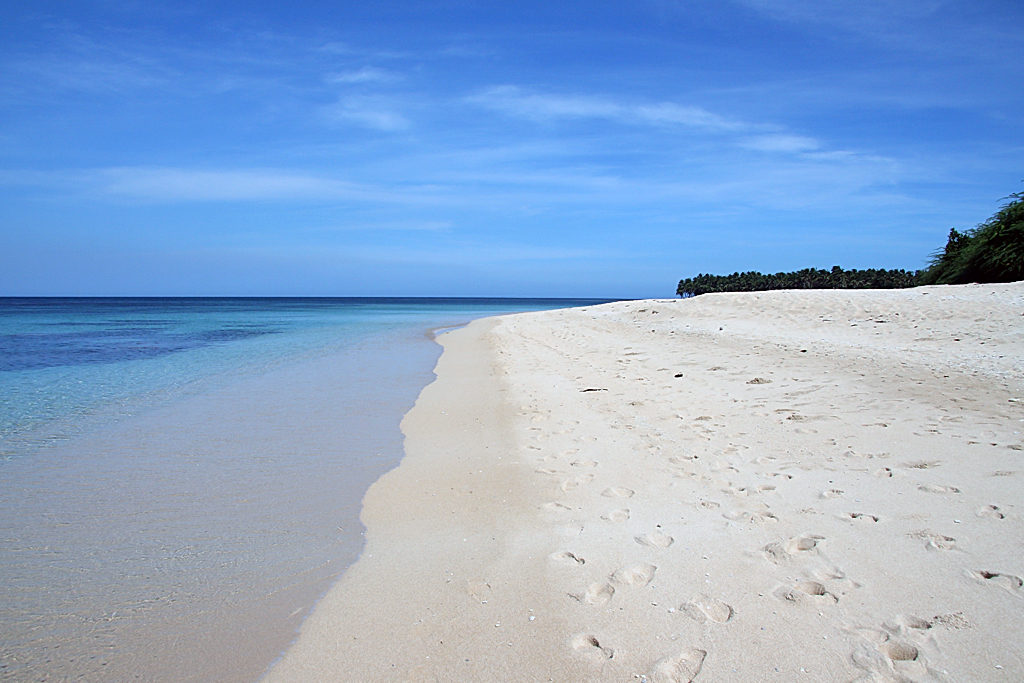
Saud Beach in Pagudpud, Ilocos Norte

== Bicol ==
=== Albay ===
- Bacacay
  - Hindi Beach
  - Pinamuntugan Beach (13°20′01″N 123°54′52″E)
  - Coron-Coron Beach (13°18′01″N 123°47′08″E)
  - Panarayon Beach (13°18′21″N 123°46′53″E)
  - Sogod Beach (13°18′43″N 123°46′41″E)
  - Cabungahan Beach
- Manito
  - Ilologan Beach
- Rapu-Rapu
  - Batan Island (13°13′55″N 123°57′25″E)
  - Guinanayan Island (13°17′39″N 123°57′29″E)
- Tabaco
  - San Lorenzo Beach
  - Punta Beach (13°24′23″N 123°45′54″E)
- Tiwi
  - Joroan Beach (13°29′31″N 123°37′26″E)

=== Camarines Norte ===
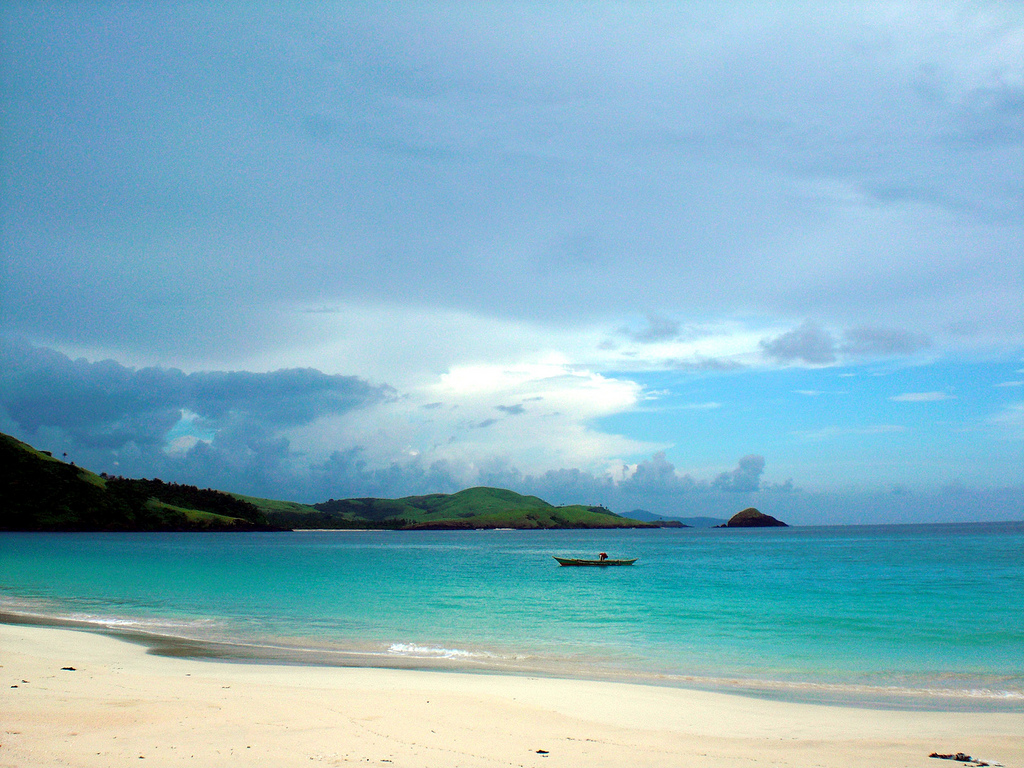
Calaguas Islands, Vinzons, Camarines Norte

- Daet
  - Bagasbas Beach (14°08′09″N 122°59′01″E)
- Mercedes
  - Apuao Grande Island (14°05′02″N 123°05′24″E)
  - Caringo Island (14°02′17″N 123°05′46″E)
- Paracale
  - Maculabo Island (14°23′20″N 122°48′46″E)
- Vinzons
  - Calaguas Islands (14°28′36″N 122°56′20″E)
  - Guintinua Island (14°24′33″N 122°57′17″E)
  - Tinaga Island

=== Camarines Sur ===
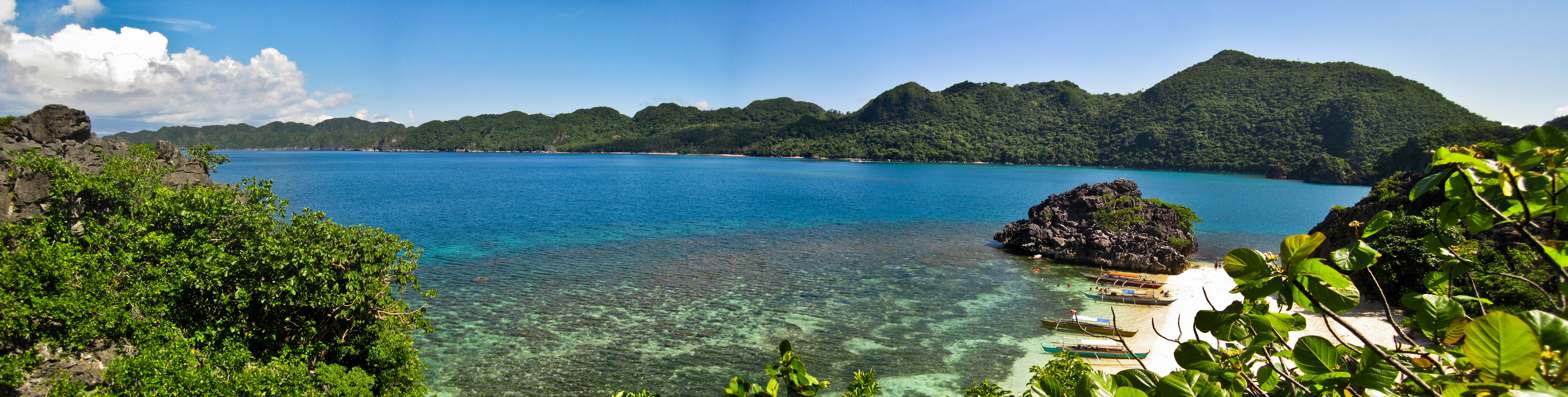
Matukad Island, Caramoan, Camarines Sur

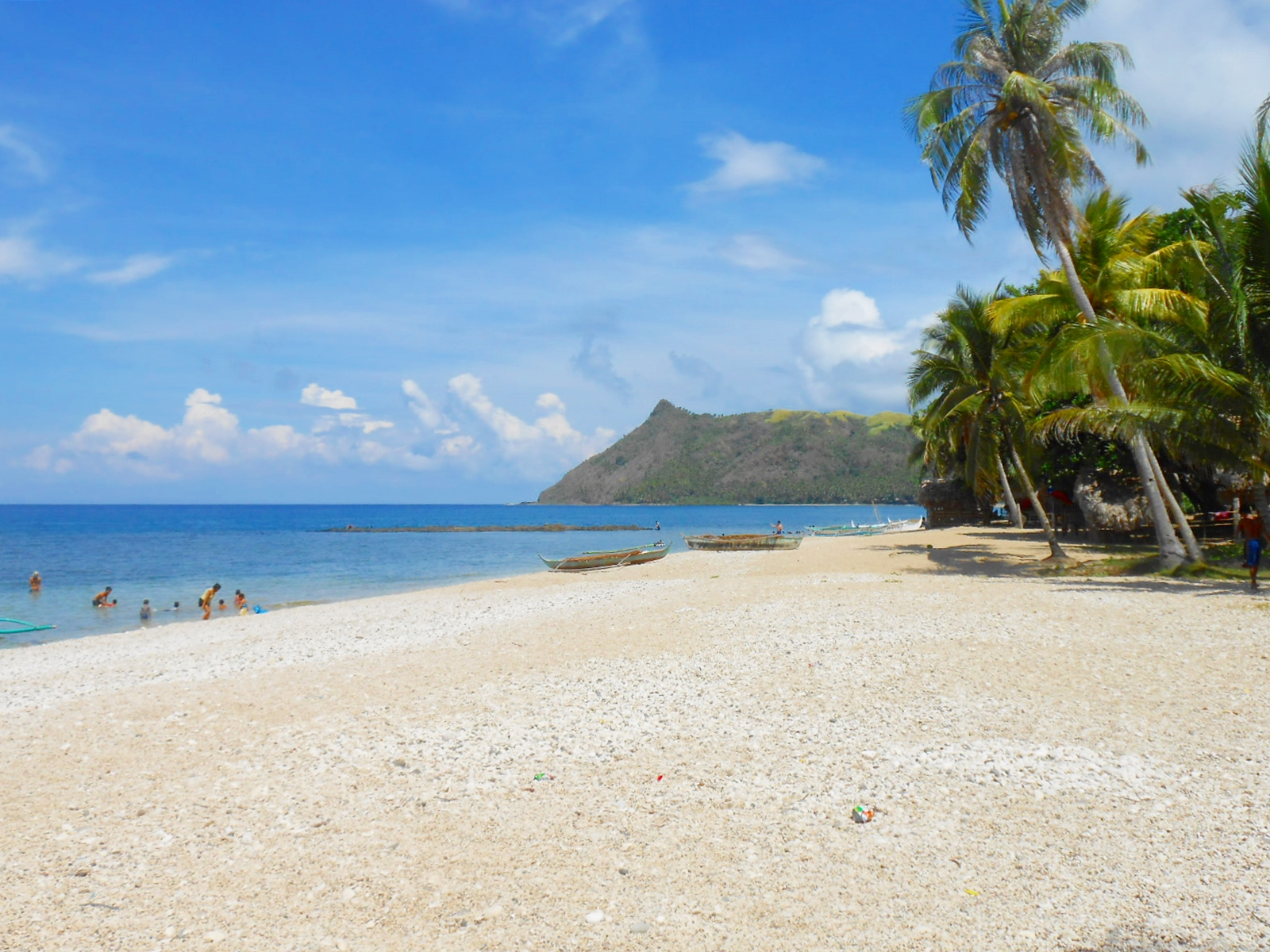
Bagolatao Beach in Minalabac, Camarines Sur

- Balatan
  - Animasola Island (13°13′11″N 123°02′46″E)
  - Iligrande Beaches
- Caramoan
  - Cotivas Island (13°57′00″N 123°51′12″E)
  - Gota Beach (13°48′13″N 123°53′03″E)
  - Hunongan Island
  - Kalagikhik Island (13°43′59″N 123°53′03″E)
  - Lahos Island (13°48′27″N 123°54′27″E)
  - Lahuy Island (13°57′36″N 123°50′01″E)
  - Matukad Island (13°48′35″N 123°53′46″E)
  - Minalahos Island (13°48′26″N 123°53′17″E)
  - Pitogo Island (13°46′30″N 123°57′05″E)
  - Sabitang Laya Island (13°51′54″N 123°51′32″E)
  - Tinago Island
- Del Gallego
  - Sta. Rita Island Beach Resort (13°55′22″N 122°33′16″E)
- Garchitorena
  - Isla de Monteverde (13°58′21″N 123°30′48″E)
  - Pinaglukaban Island
  - del Pilar Group of Islands
- Lagonoy
  - San Jose Beach
  - Mater Fatima Sanctuary
  - Longori Beach
  - Santa Cruz Beach
- Minalabac
  - Bagolatao Beach (13°27′16″N 123°09′33″E)
  - San Isidro Beachfront Park
- Pasacao
  - Daruanac Island (13°29′33″N 123°03′28″E)
  - Balogo Beach (13°29′59″N 123°03′49″E)
  - Caranan Beach (13°31′22″N 123°00′01″E)
  - Dipaluog Beaches
- Presentacion
  - Aguirangan Island (13°42′12″N 123°40′11″E)
- Sagñay
  - Nato Beachfront Complex I (13°36′32″N 123°32′16″E)
  - Nato Beachfront Complex II
  - Patitinan Beach (13°33′09″N 123°34′48″E)
  - Atulayan Island (13°35′15″N 123°33′52″E)
  - Mabca Beachfront Park
- San Jose
  - Dolo Beach (13°42′29″N 123°34′03″E)
  - Port Alfred Beach Resort (13°42′48″N 123°34′19″E)
  - Sabang Beach (13°43′11″N 123°34′41″E)
- Siruma
  - Bahao Beaches
  - Malaconini Coastal Reserve
  - Tandoc Marine Sanctuary
- Tinambac
  - Tamban Beaches
  - Bagacay Beaches
  - Holmoga Beach

=== Catanduanes ===
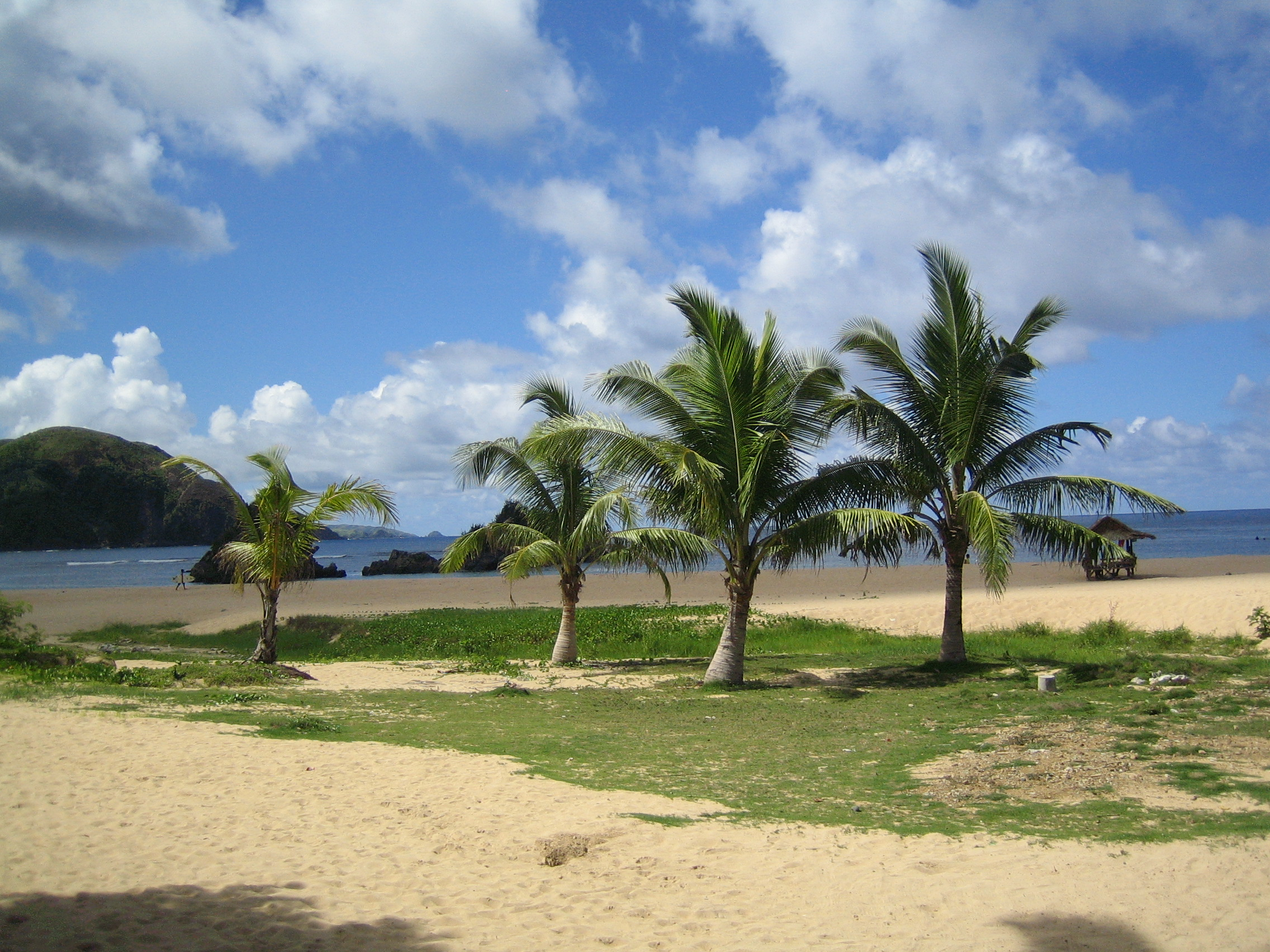
Puraran Beach, Baras, Catanduanes

- Baras
  - Puraran Beach (13°41′23″N 124°23′42″E)
- Virac
  - Cabugao Beach
  - Twin Rock Beach (13°31′17″N 124°12′42″E)

=== Masbate ===
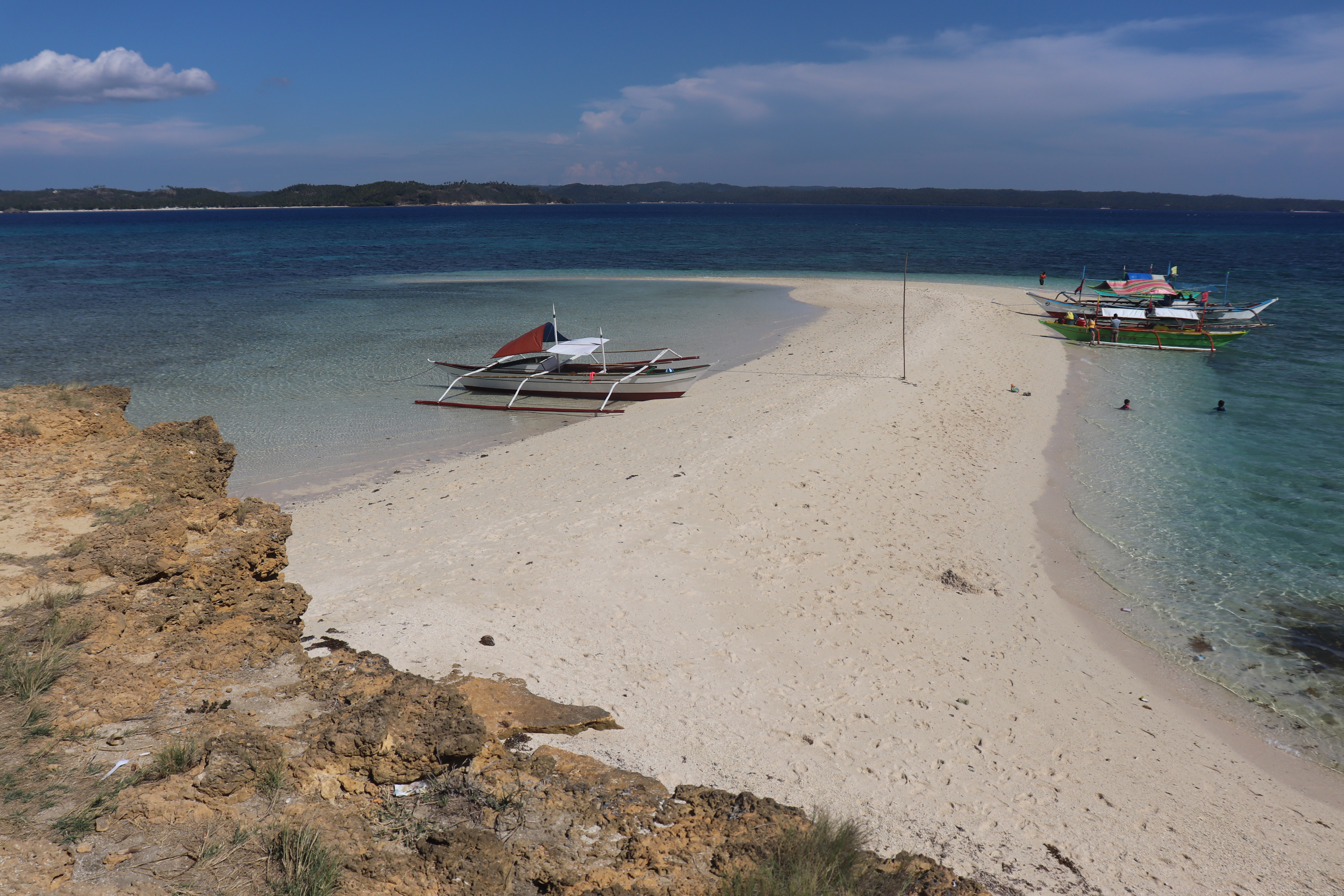
Tinalisayan Island, San Pascual, Masbate

- Aroroy
  - Cambatang Beach
  - Cangcayat Beach
  - Napayauan Island (12°21′09″N 123°14′18″E)
  - Tinigban Beach (12°29′50″N 123°15′06″E)
- Claveria
  - Ki-albay Beach
  - Puting Island
  - San Isidro Beach
- Dimasalang
  - Magcaraget Island (12°16′08″N 123°49′56″E)
  - Deagan Island (12°15′04″N 123°50′57″E)
- Masbate
  - Buntud Beach
- Monreal
  - Cagpating Island (12°39′12″N 123°35′07″E)
- Placer
  - Nagarao Island (11°49′09″N 123°50′42″E)
- San Fernando
  - Talisay Beach
- San Pascual
  - Sombrero Island (13°08′35″N 122°50′46″E)
  - Tinalisay Island (13°09′24″N 122°55′54″E)

=== Sorsogon ===
- Bulan
  - Sabang Beach (12°39′30″N 123°52′29″E)
- Bulusan
  - Dancalan Beach (12°45′45″N 124°08′16″E)
- Gubat
  - Rizal Beach (12°53′30″N 124°07′44″E)
- Magallanes
  - Bagatao Island (12°49′17″N 123°49′06″E)
- Matnog
  - Calintaan Island (12°32′27″N 124°06′15″E)
  - Juag Island (12°33′12″N 124°06′59″E)
  - Subic Island
  - Tikling Island (12°34′40″N 124°07′22″E)
- Sorsogon
  - Libanon Beach (13°03′42″N 124°00′54″E)
  - Paguriran Island
  - Tolong Gapo Beach (13°02′19″N 124°02′57″E)

== Cagayan Valley ==
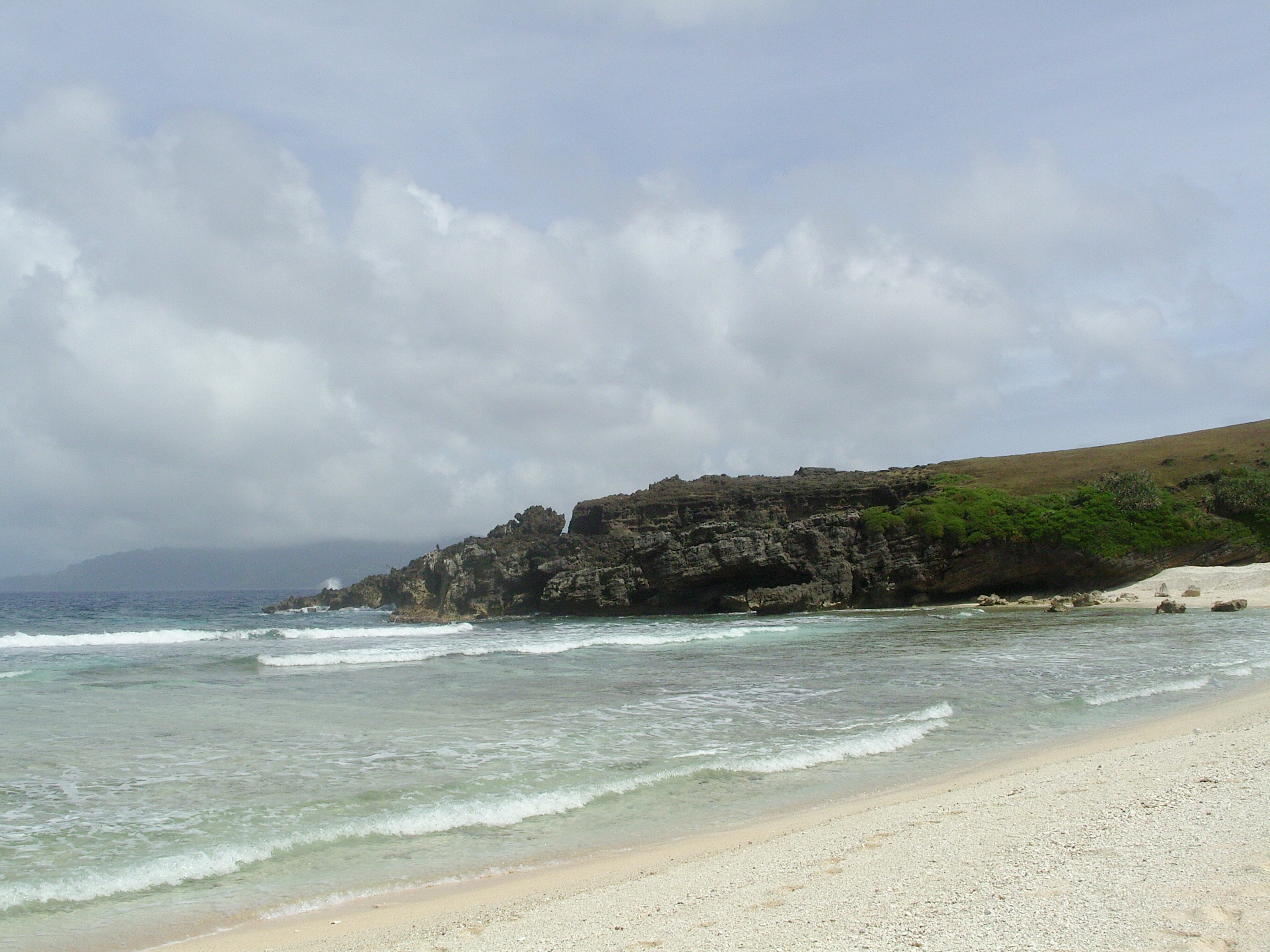
White sand beach at Sabtang island.

=== Batanes ===
- Basco
  - Valugan Boulder Beach (20°26′22″N 121°59′20″E)
- Mahatao
  - Madiwedved Surf Beach
- Sabtang
  - Ivuhos Island (20°18′49″N 121°49′00″E)
  - Nakabuang Beach
  - Sabtang Cove

=== Cagayan ===
- Aparri
  - Barit Island
  - Fuga Island
- Calayan
  - Babuyan Claro Island
  - Calayan Island
  - Camiguin Island
  - Centro Beach
  - Dalupiri Island
  - Sibang Cove
- Claveria
  - Centinela Beach
  - Ubing-Ubing Beach
- Sanchez Mira
  - Masisit
- Santa Ana
  - Anguib Beach
  - Cape Engaño
  - Manidad (Crocodile) Island
  - Palaui Island
  - San Vicente Island

=== Isabela ===
- Divilacan
  - Honeymoon Island
  - Oway Beach
- Palanan
  - Dicotcotan Beach
  - Didadungan Beach

== Caraga ==
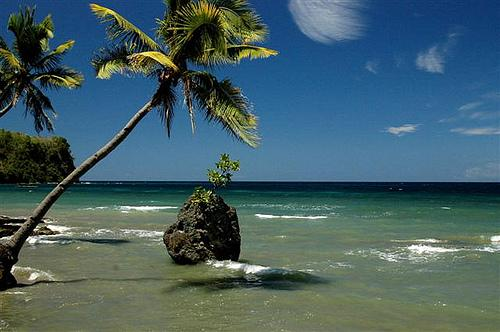
Bolihon Beach in Carmen, Agusan del Norte

=== Agusan del Norte ===
- Buenavista
  - Tinago Beach
- Cabadbaran
  - Dagani Beach
- Carmen
  - Bolihon Beach
  - Vinapor Beach
- Nasipit
  - Ata-atahon Beach
  - Cubu-Cubi Beach

=== Dinagat Islands ===
- Del Pilar
  - Hinabian Beach
- Basilisa
  - Bitaug Beach
  - Sundayo Beach
- Libjo
  - Pangabangan Island
  - Pig-ot Hideaway Beach
- Loreto
  - Sangay Beach and Dive Site
- San Jose
  - Baing Beach and Dive Site
  - Santa Cruz Beach

=== Surigao del Norte ===
- Burgos
  - Alegria Beach
- Dapa
  - Corregidor Island
  - Giwan Beach
  - Pansukian Island
  - Union Beach
- Del Carmen
  - Caub Beach
- General Luna
  - Daku Islet
  - Guyam Islet
  - Naked Islet
  - Siargao Island
- Pilar
  - Duot Beach
  - Caridad Beach
  - Lukod Beach
  - Magpupungko Beach
  - Taglungnan Beach
- San Isidro
  - Pacifico Beach
- Santa Monica
  - Alegria Beach
- Socorro, Surigao del Norte
  - Bucas Grande Island
  - Puyangi Beach
  - Sohoton Beach
- Surigao
  - Lipata Beach
  - Mabua Beach

=== Surigao del Sur ===
- Barobo
  - Cabgan Island
  - Licanto Beach
- Cagwait
  - White Beach
- Cantilan
  - Baybay (San Pedro) Beach
  - General Island
- Cortes
  - Rock Beach
- Lanuza
  - Doot Poktoy Beach
- Lianga
  - Kansilad Beach
- San Agustin
  - Britania Island
- Tandag
  - Mabua Beach
  - Mancangangi Island

== Central Luzon ==
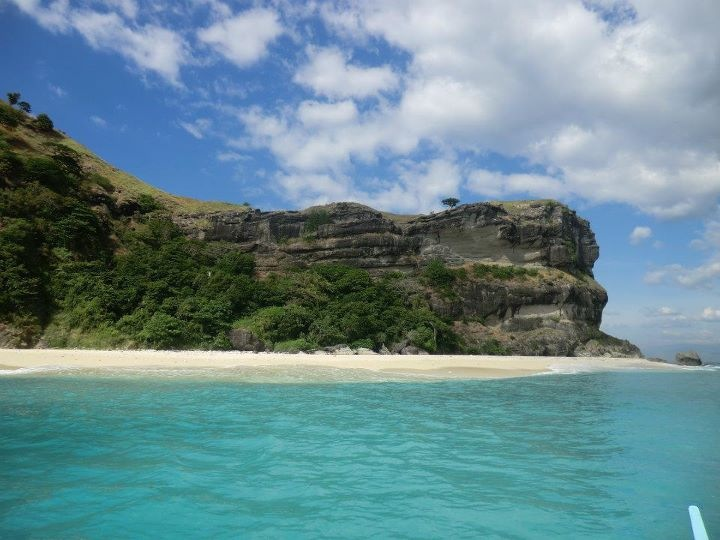
Capones Island in San Antonio, Zambales

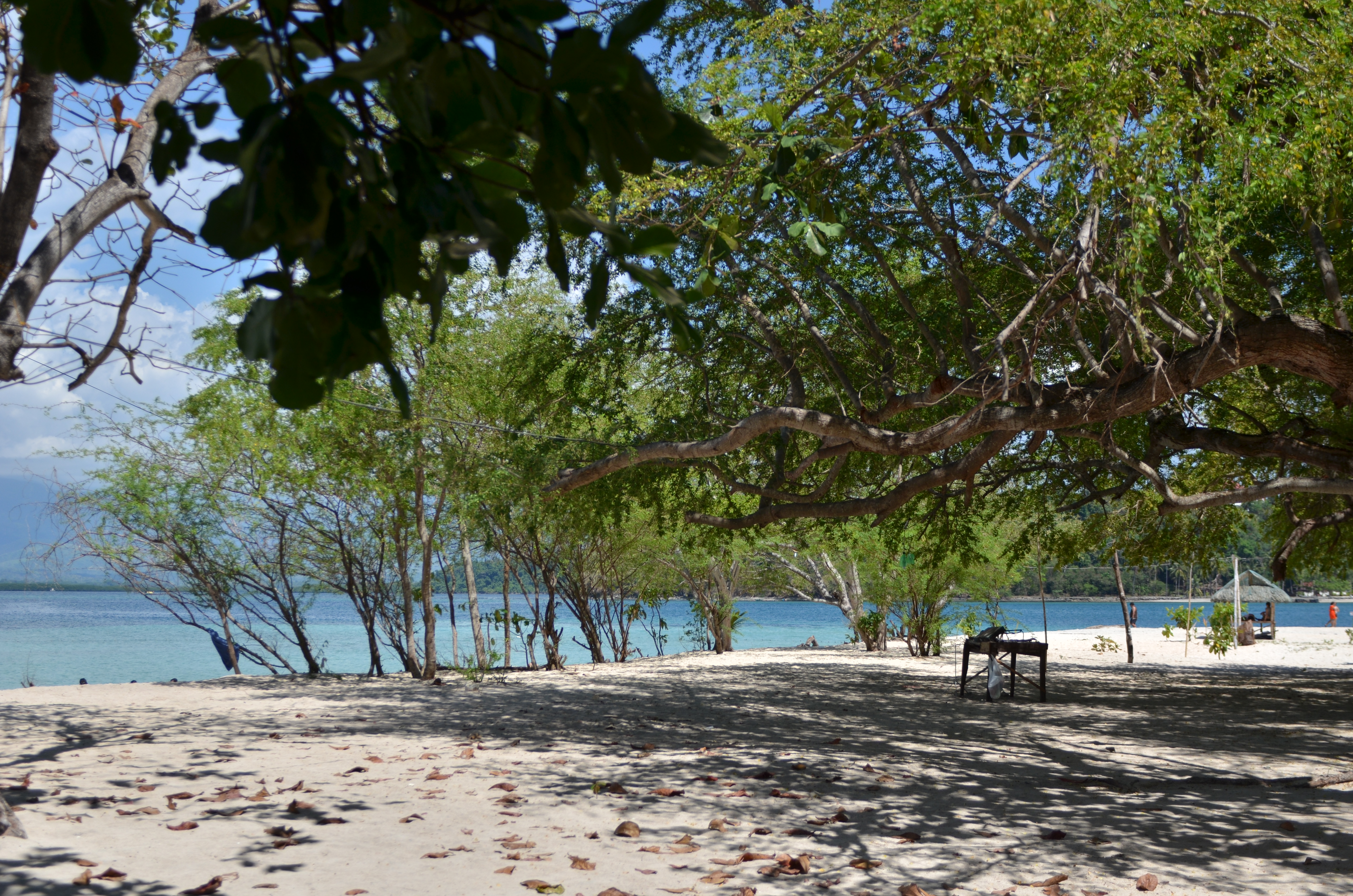
Malawa Island, Zambales

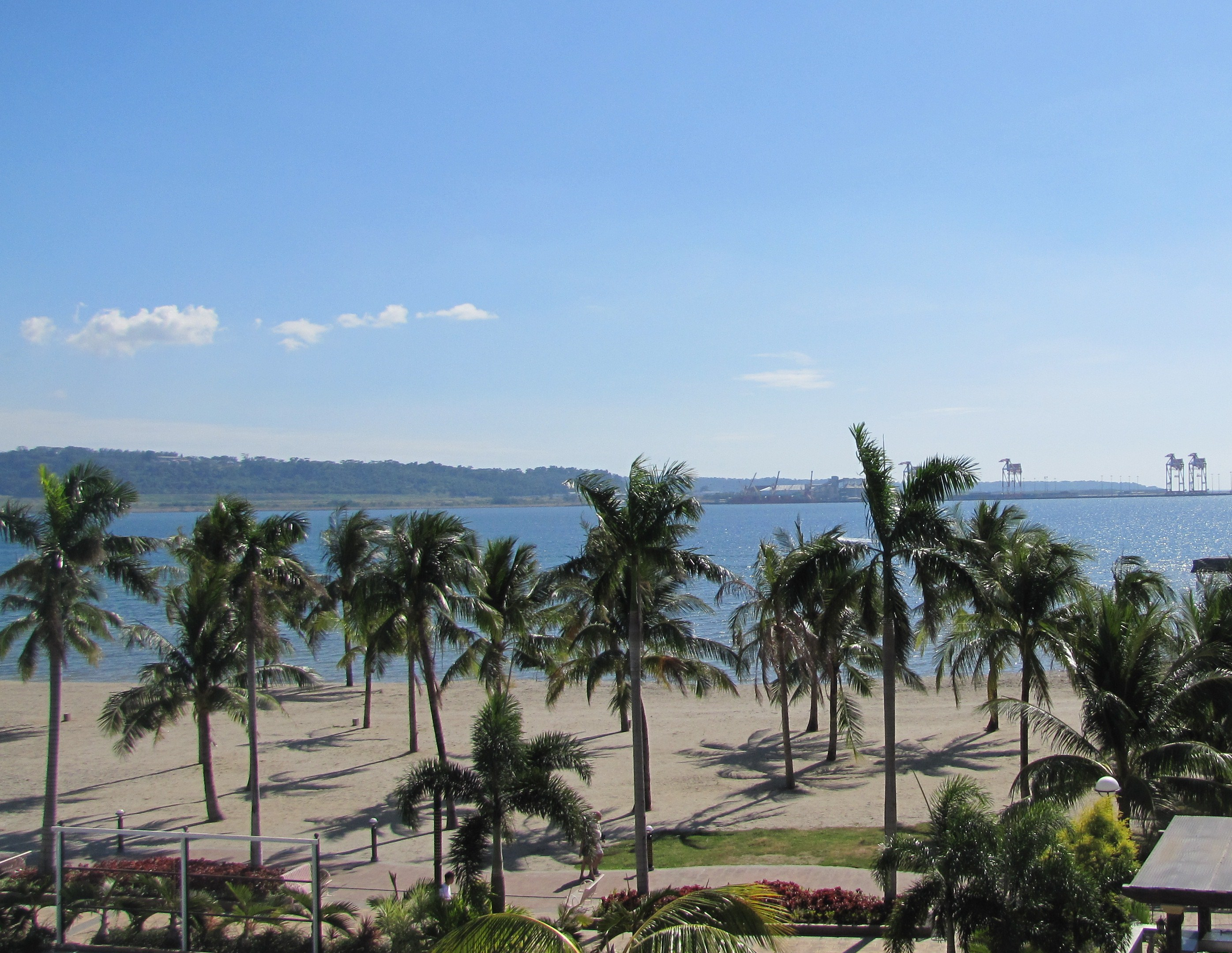
The boardwalk beach at the Subic Bay Freeport Zone

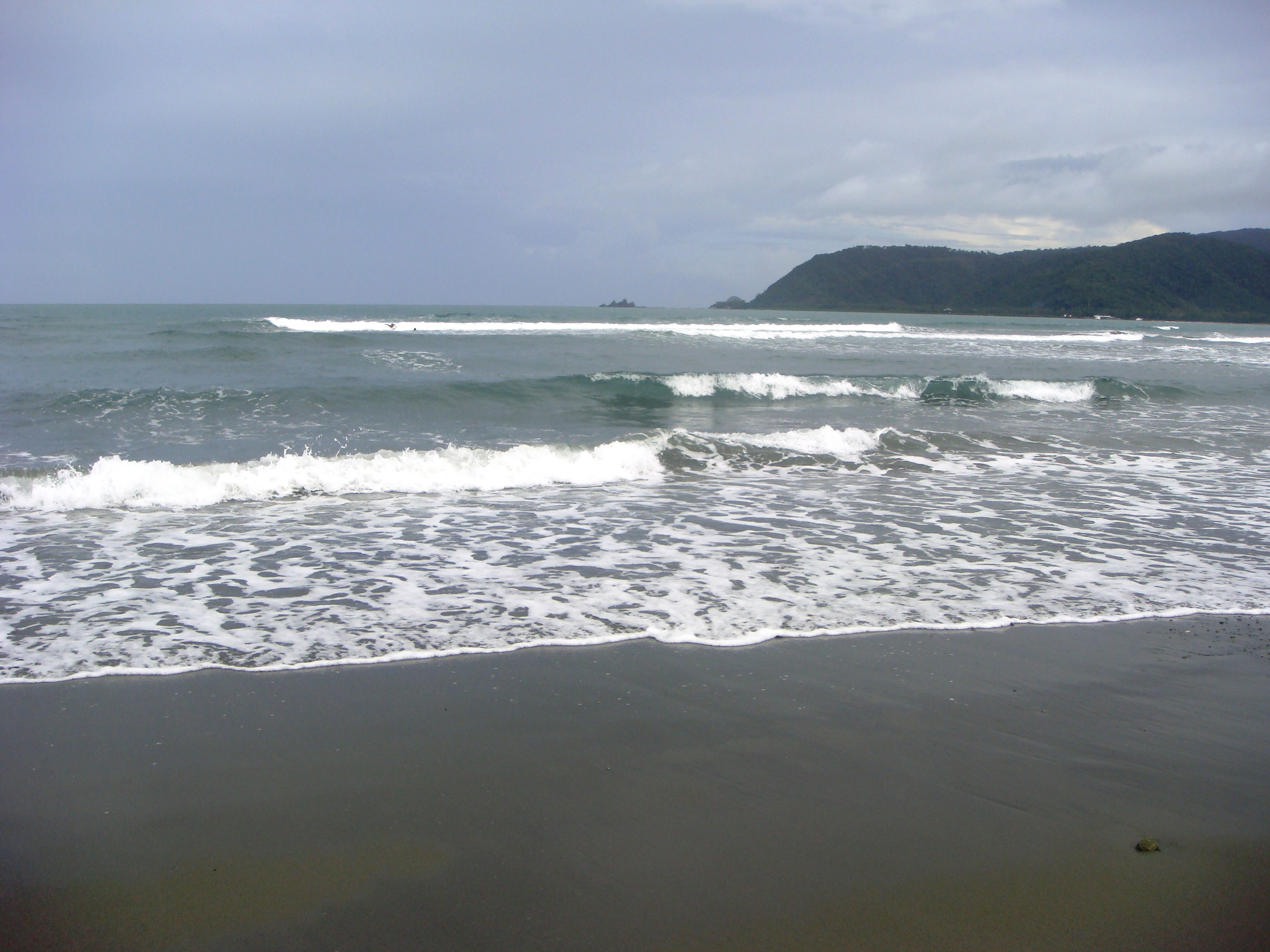
Sabang Beach in Baler, Aurora

=== Aurora ===
- Baler
  - Cemento Beach
  - Digisit Beach
  - Sabang Beach
- Casiguran
  - Casapsapan Beach
  - Dalugan Beach
  - Diniog Beach
  - San Ildefonso Peninsula
- Dilasag
  - Canawer Beach
- Dipaculao
  - Ampere Beach
  - Borlongan Beach
  - Dinadiawan Beach
- San Luis
  - Dibut Bay
  - Dicasalarin Bay

=== Bataan ===
- Bagac
  - Costa Vida Privada
  - Montemar Beach
  - Playa La Caleta
  - Quinawan Bay
  - Saysain Beach
- Mariveles
  - Agwawan Beach
  - Camaya Coast (Wain)
  - Lusong Beach
  - Mawakis Cove
  - Talaga Beach
- Morong
  - Anvaya Cove
  - Camayan Beach
  - Nagbalayong Beach
  - Sabang Beach
  - West Nuk Cove

=== Zambales ===
- Candelaria
  - Potipot Island
  - Uacon Beach
- Masinloc
  - San Salvador Island
- Olongapo
  - Baloy Long Beach
  - Barrio Barretto Beach
  - Chiquita Island
  - Grande Island
  - Waterfront Boardwalk Beach
- Palauig
  - Magalawa Island
  - Matalvis Island
- San Antonio
  - Anawangin Cove
  - Camara Island
  - Capones Island
  - Nagsasa Cove
  - Pundaquit Beach
  - Silaguin Cove
  - Talisayan Cove
- San Narciso
  - La Paz Beach
- Santa Cruz
  - Hermana Mayor Island
  - Hermana Menor Island
  - Longos Beach
  - Lucapon Beach
  - Malabago Beach
  - Sabang Beach (Zambales)
- Subic
  - Cawag Cove
  - Matain Beach
  - Pamana (Pequeña) Island
  - Redondo Beach

== Soccsksargen ==
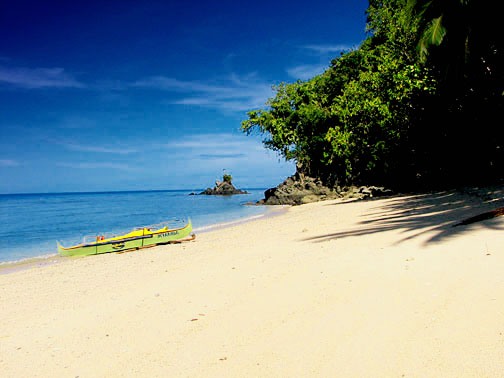
Tuka Beach in Kiamba, Sarangani

=== Sarangani ===
- Glan
  - Gumasa Beach
  - Lago Beach
  - Margus Beach
  - Taluya Beach
- Kiamba
  - Tuka Beach

=== South Cotabato ===
- General Santos
  - London Beach
  - Veterans Beach

=== Sultan Kudarat ===
- Lebak
  - Sodoy Beach
- Kalamansig
  - Balot Island
  - Dumangas Nuevo Beach
  - Poral Beach
  - Santiac Beach
- Palimbang
  - Alidama Island

== Central Visayas ==
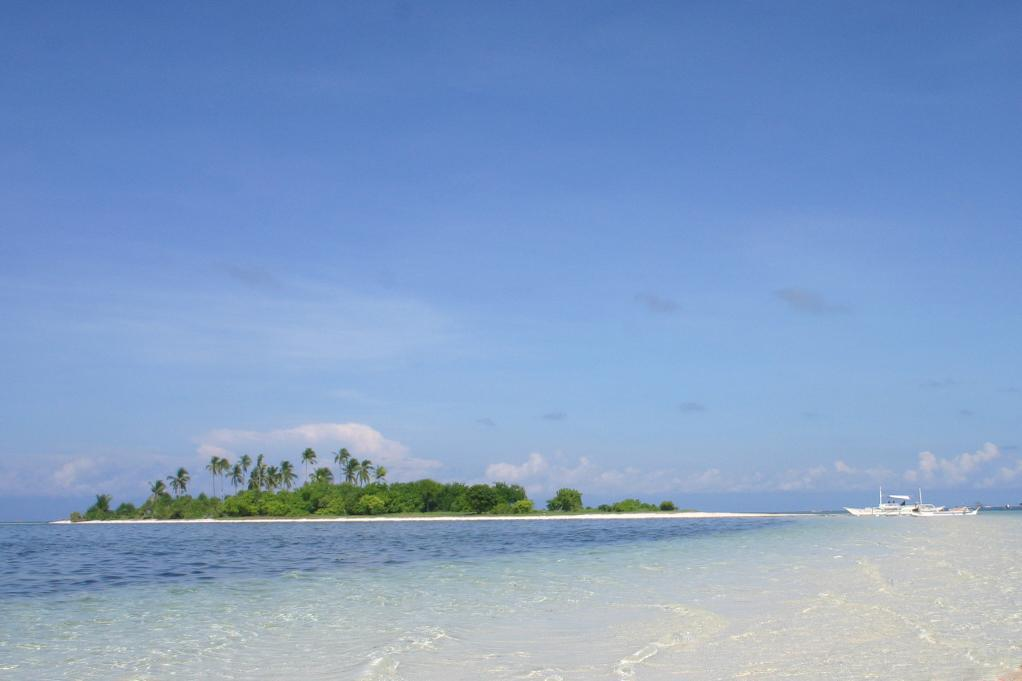
Virgin Island in Bohol

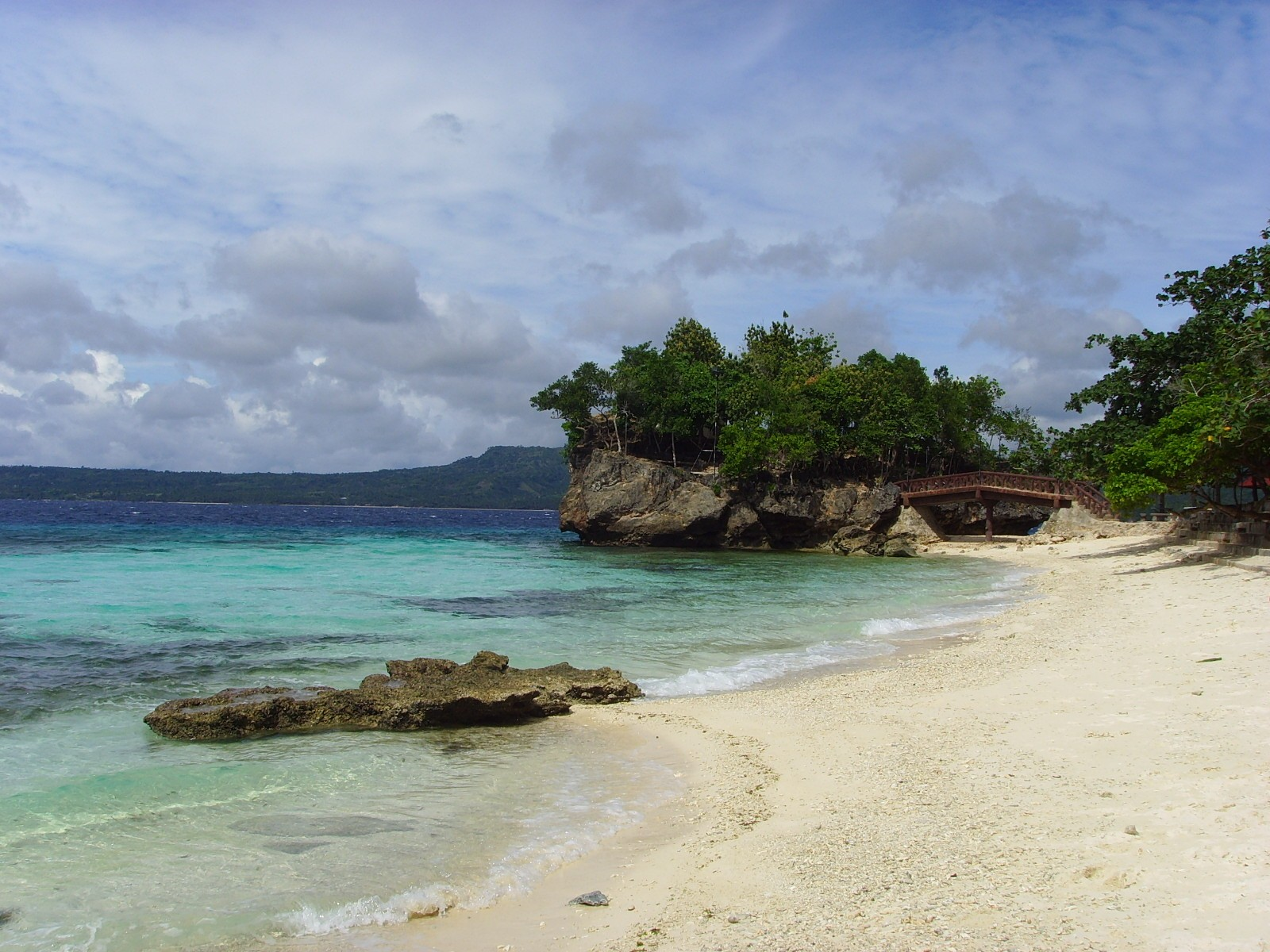
Salagdoong Beach in Maria, Siquijor

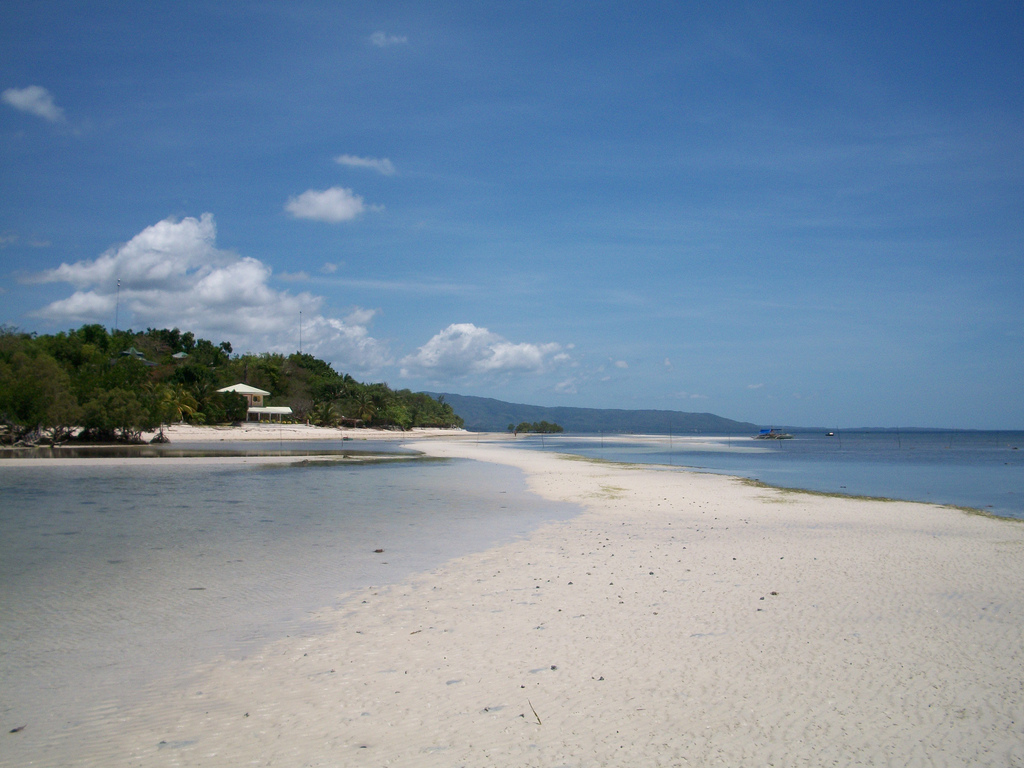
Larena, Siquijor

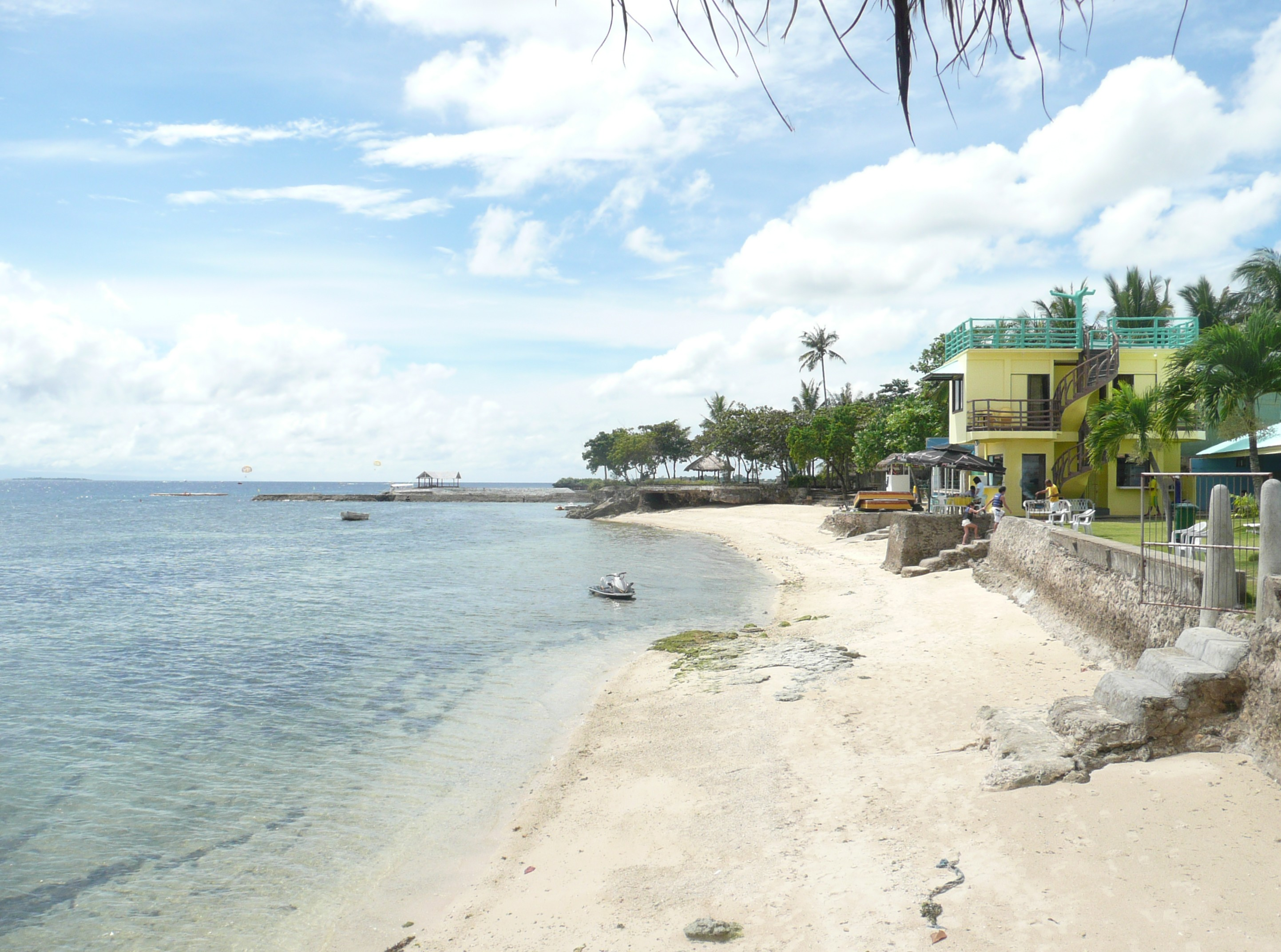
Mactan Island, Cebu

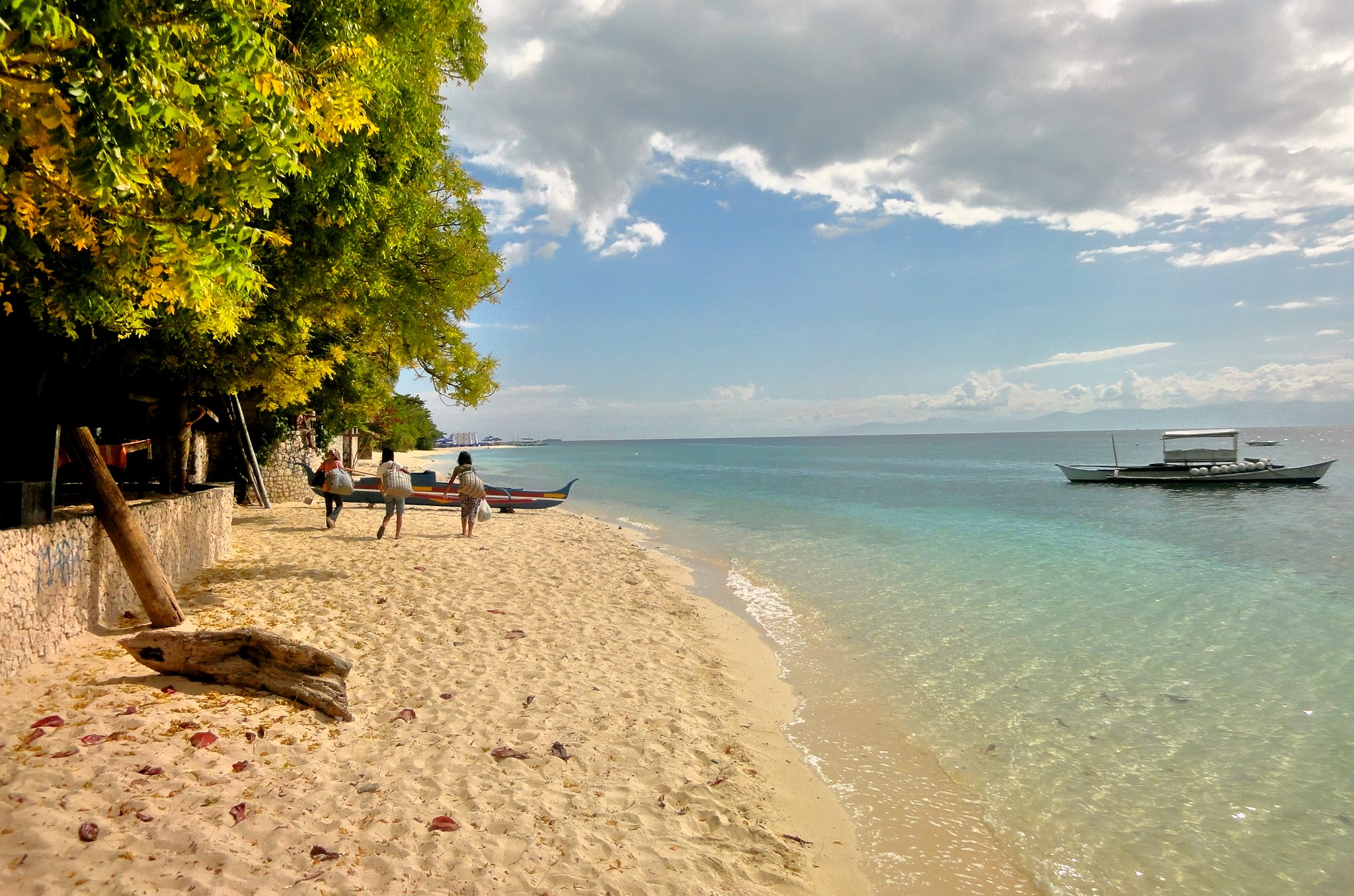
Bas Daku in Moalboal (White Beach)

=== Bohol ===
- Alburquerque
  - Santa Fe Beach
- Anda
  - Bas Daku Beach
  - Bugnao Beach
  - Candabong Beach
  - Kinale Beach
- Baclayon
  - Laya Beach
  - Pamilacan Island
- Dauis
  - Bikini Beach
  - Bingag Beach
  - Dao Beach
  - San Isidro Beach
- Dimiao
  - Imelda Beach
- Duero
  - Duero Beach
- Jagna
  - Canuba Beach
- Loay
  - Clarin Beach
- Loon
  - Cabilao Island
  - Lintuan Beach
- Panglao
  - Alona Beach
  - Bagobo Beach
  - Balicasag Island
  - Bolod Beach
  - Danao Beach
  - Doljo Beach
  - Dumaloan Beach
  - Gak-ang Island
  - Libaong Beach
  - Momo Beach
  - Panglao Island
  - Puntod (Virgin) Island
- President Carlos P. Garcia
  - Aquining Beach
- Tagbilaran
  - Kain-git Beach
- Talibon
  - Bansaan Island

=== Cebu ===
- Alcoy
  - Tingko Beach
- Alegria
  - Madridejos Beach
- Aloguinsan
  - Cantabogon Beach
- Argao
  - Looc Beach
  - Tulic Beach
- Badian
  - Lambug Beach
  - Zaragosa Island
- Bantayan
  - Botigues Island
  - Doong Island
  - Hilotongan Island
  - Lipayran Island
  - Silion (Virgin) Island
  - Yao Island
- Barili
  - Sayaw Beach
- Bogo
  - Capitancillo Island
- Carmen
  - Hinagdanan Beach
- Cordova
  - Gilutongan Island
  - Nalusuan Island
- Daanbantayan
  - Carnaza Island
  - Malapascua Island
- Lapu-Lapu
  - Buyong Beach
  - Caohagan Island
  - Cumungi Island
  - Mactan Island
  - Maribago Beach
  - Marigondon Beach
  - Olango Islands
  - Pangan-an Island
  - Punta Engaño
  - Suba Basbas Beach
  - Sulpa Islet
- Madridejos
  - Bunacan Beach
  - Malbago Beach
- Medellin
  - Jibitnil Island
  - Kawit Beach
  - Tindog Beach
- Moalboal
  - Basdaku Beach (White Beach)
  - Panagsama Beach
  - Pescador Island
- Oslob
  - Sumilon Island
  - Tan-awan Beach
- Pilar
  - Cawit Beach
  - Naukban Beach
- Poro
  - Boho Beach
  - Guiwanon Beach
- Ronda
  - Kasadya Beach
- San Fernando
  - San Isidro (Pulchra) Beach
- San Francisco
  - Esperanza Beach
  - Mangodlong Rock Beach
  - Santiago Beach
  - Tulang Island
- San Remigio
  - Anapog Beach
  - Hagnaya Beach
  - Punta Sabil
  - Tambongon Beach
- Santa Fe
  - Guintacan Island
  - Hilantagaan Island
  - Maricaban Beach
  - Okoy Beach
  - Sugar Beach
- Santander
  - Liloan Beach
  - Looc Beach
- Sogod
  - Calumboyan Beach
- Tabuelan
  - Maravilla Beach
  - Tabunok Beach
- Tudela
  - Mag-agay-ay Beach

=== Siquijor ===
- Maria
  - Salagdoong Beach

== Davao ==
=== Davao del Norte ===
- Samal
  - Buenavista Island
  - Kaputian Beach
  - Malipano Island
  - Samal Island
  - Talicud Island

=== Davao Occidental ===
- Sarangani
  - Balut Island
  - Sarangani Island

=== Davao Oriental ===
- Baganga
  - Baculin Beach
- Governor Generoso
  - Lavigan Beach
  - Pundaguitan Beach
- Lupon
  - Aroma Beach
- Manay
  - Tagtalisay Beach
- Mati
  - Dahican Beach
  - Mayo Beach
  - Oak Island
  - Pujada Island
  - Waniban Island
- San Isidro
  - Batobato Beach

== Eastern Visayas ==
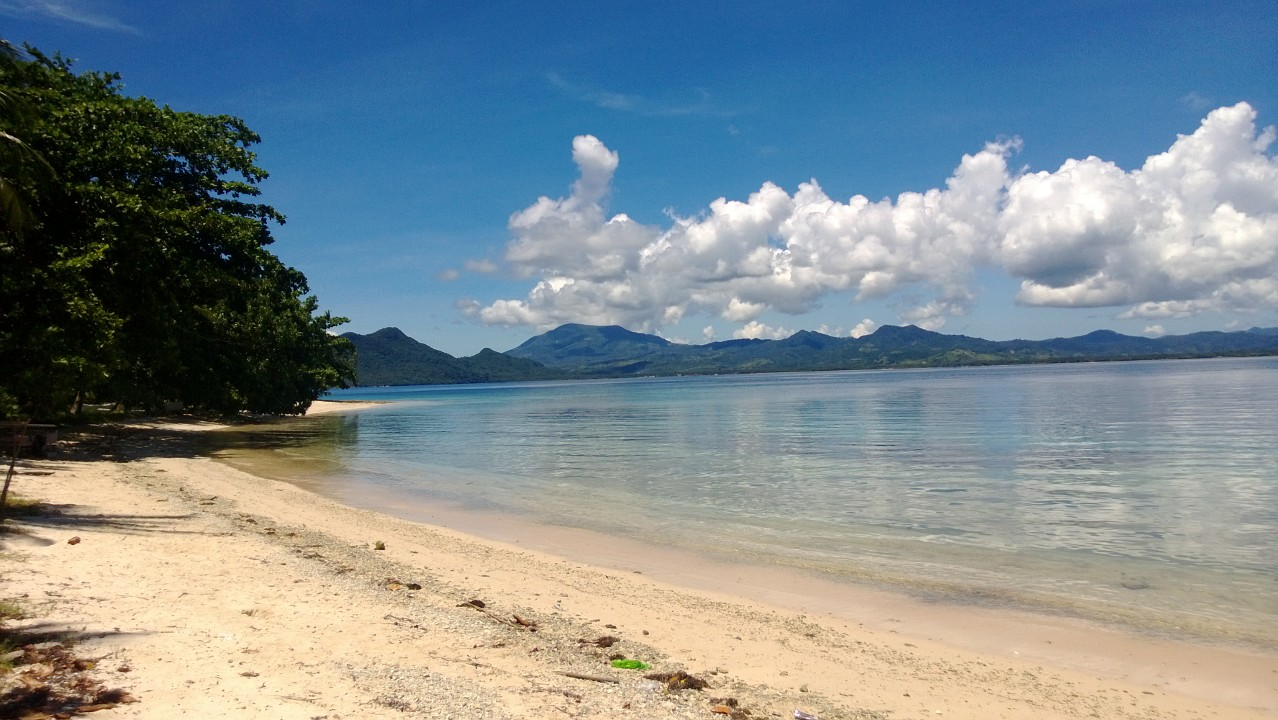
White Beach at San Pablo Island, Hinunangan, Southern Leyte

=== Biliran ===
- Almeria
  - Agta Beach
  - Dalutan Island
- Culaba
  - Looc Beach
- Kawayan
  - Cogon Beach
  - Ginuroan Island
  - Tingkasan Island
- Maripipi
  - Candol Beach
  - Maripipi Island
  - Napo Beach
  - Sambawan Island
- Naval
  - Banderahan Beach
  - Capiñahan Island
  - Higatangan Island

=== Eastern Samar ===
- Borongan
  - Boulevard Beach
  - Divinuvo Island
  - Guitagican Beach
- Dolores
  - Kaybani Island
- Hernani
  - Canhugas Beach
- Guiuan
  - Calicoan Island
  - Homonhon Island
  - Kantican Island
  - Sapao Beach
  - Sulangan Beach
  - Suluan Island
  - Tubabao Island
- Maydolong
  - Minasngi Beach
- Salcedo
  - Buabua (Mercedes) Beach
- San Julian
  - Liliputan Beach
- Taft
  - Macalayo Island

=== Leyte ===
- Barugo
  - De Guia Beach
- Capoocan
  - Zapatos Island
- Hindang
  - Cuatro Islas
    - Apid Island
    - Himokilan Island
- Inopacan
  - Cuatro Islas
    - Digyo Island
    - Mahaba Island
- Matalom
  - Canigao Island
- Palo
  - Red Beach
- Palompon
  - Calangaman Island
- Tacloban
  - Blue Beach
  - San Jose White Beach
- Tolosa
  - Olot Beach
  - Tadyaw Beach

=== Northern Samar ===
- Biri
  - Talisay Beach
- Bobon
  - Dancalan Beach
- Capul
  - Abak Beach
- Catarman
  - Alma Beach
  - Langtaran Beach
  - Tamburusan Beach
  - White Beach
- Laoang
  - Onay Beach
- Lavezares
  - Bani Island
- Palapag
  - Cabatuan Beach
  - Talalora Beach
- San Roque
  - Catawgan Beach
- San Vicente
  - Panganoron Beach

=== Samar ===
- Calbayog
  - Bagacay Beach
  - Binaliw Isle
  - Malajog Beach
  - Naga Beach
  - Payao Beach
- Catbalogan
  - Basiao Island Beach
  - Payao Beach
  - Buri Baras Beach
  - Malatugawi Island Beach
  - Sunshine Beach
  - Cal-apog Beach
- Marabut
  - Kalabuso Beach
  - Kapuroan Islets
  - Marabut Marine Park
- Basey
  - San Antonio Beach
  - Samar Leyte Beach
  - Bacubac Beach
  - Tingib Beach

=== Southern Leyte ===
- Hinunangan
  - San Pablo Island
  - San Pedro Island
  - Tahusan Beach
- Liloan
  - Bitu-on Beach
  - Maamo Beach
  - Panaon Island
- Macrohon
  - Kuting Beach
- Padre Burgos
  - Limasawa Island
  - Tancaan Beach
- Saint Bernard
  - Kissbon Cove resort
  - hindag-an falls
  - Saob beach

== Ilocos ==
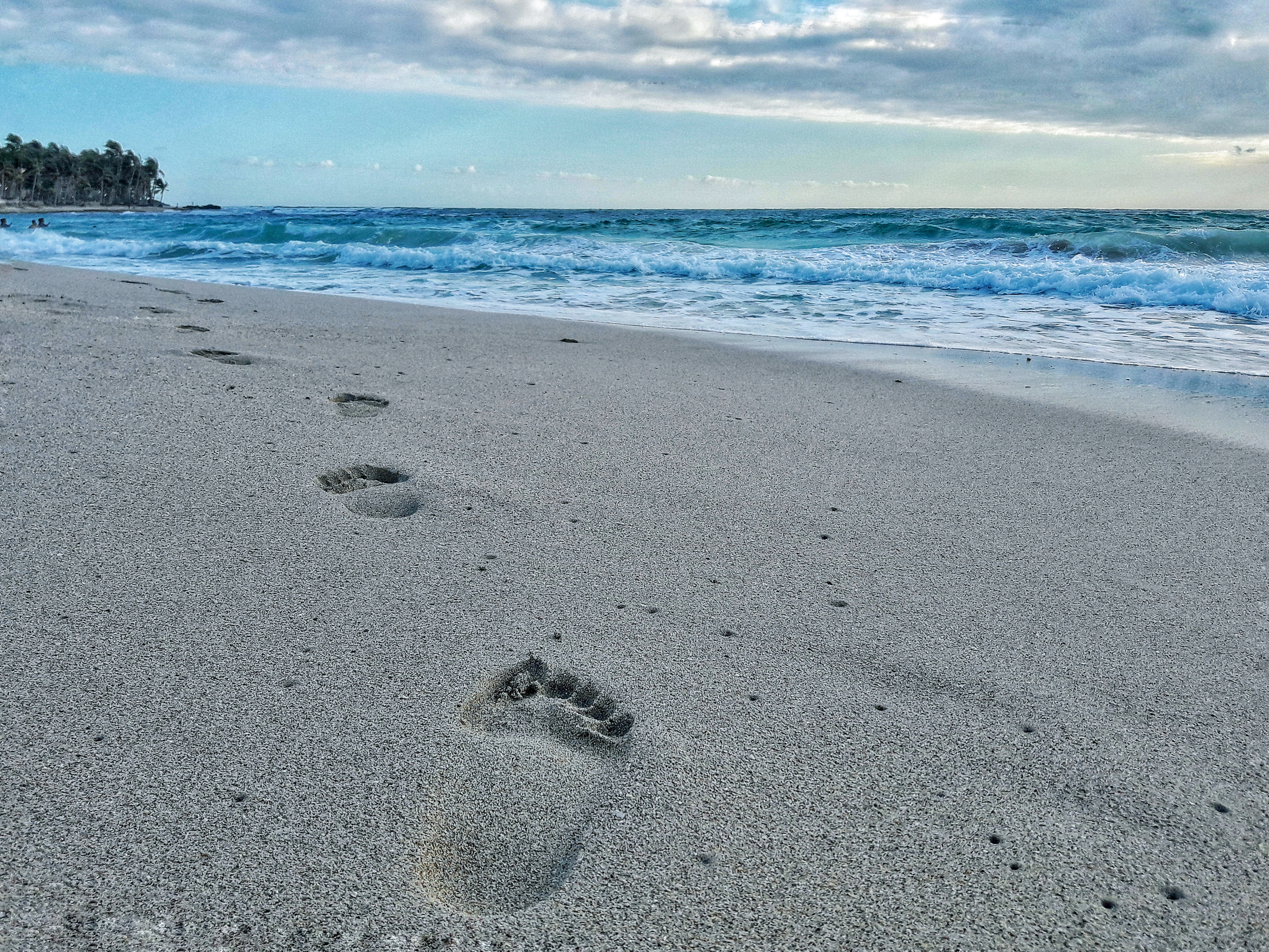
Saud Beach, Pagudpud, Ilocos Norte

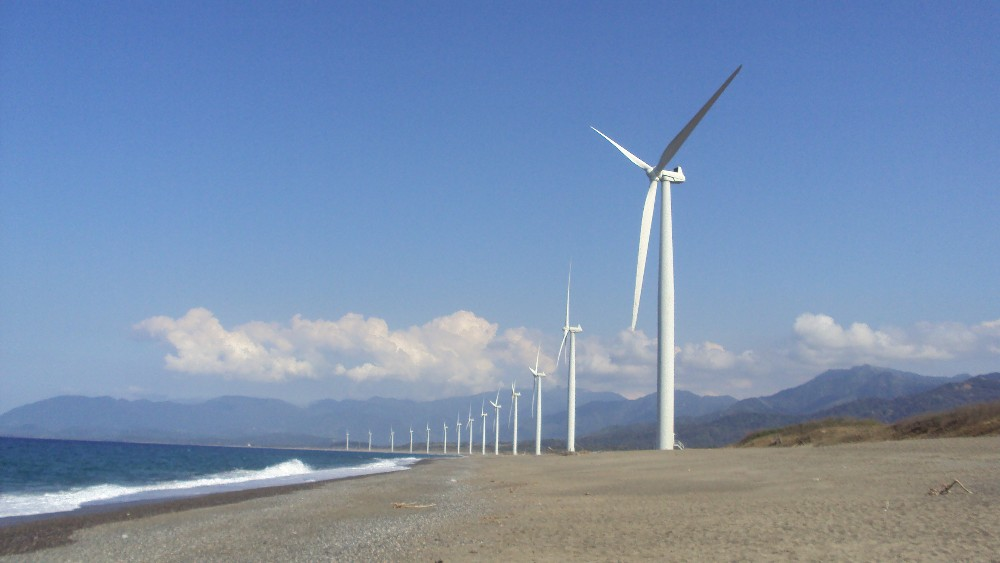
Pebble Beach, Bangui, Ilocos Norte

=== Ilocos Norte ===
- Badoc
  - Badoc Island
- Bangui
  - Pebble Beach
- Burgos
  - Capurpuraoan Beach
- Currimao
  - Pangil Beach
- Laoag
  - La Paz Beach
  - Monroe Island
  - Sabangan Beach
- Pagudpud
  - Caparispisan Beach
  - Mairaira Cove
  - Pansian Beach
  - Saud Beach
- Paoay
  - Calayab Beach
  - Puro Beach
  - Suba Beach
- Pasuquin
  - Dirique Beach
  - Sexy (Estancia) Beach

=== Ilocos Sur ===
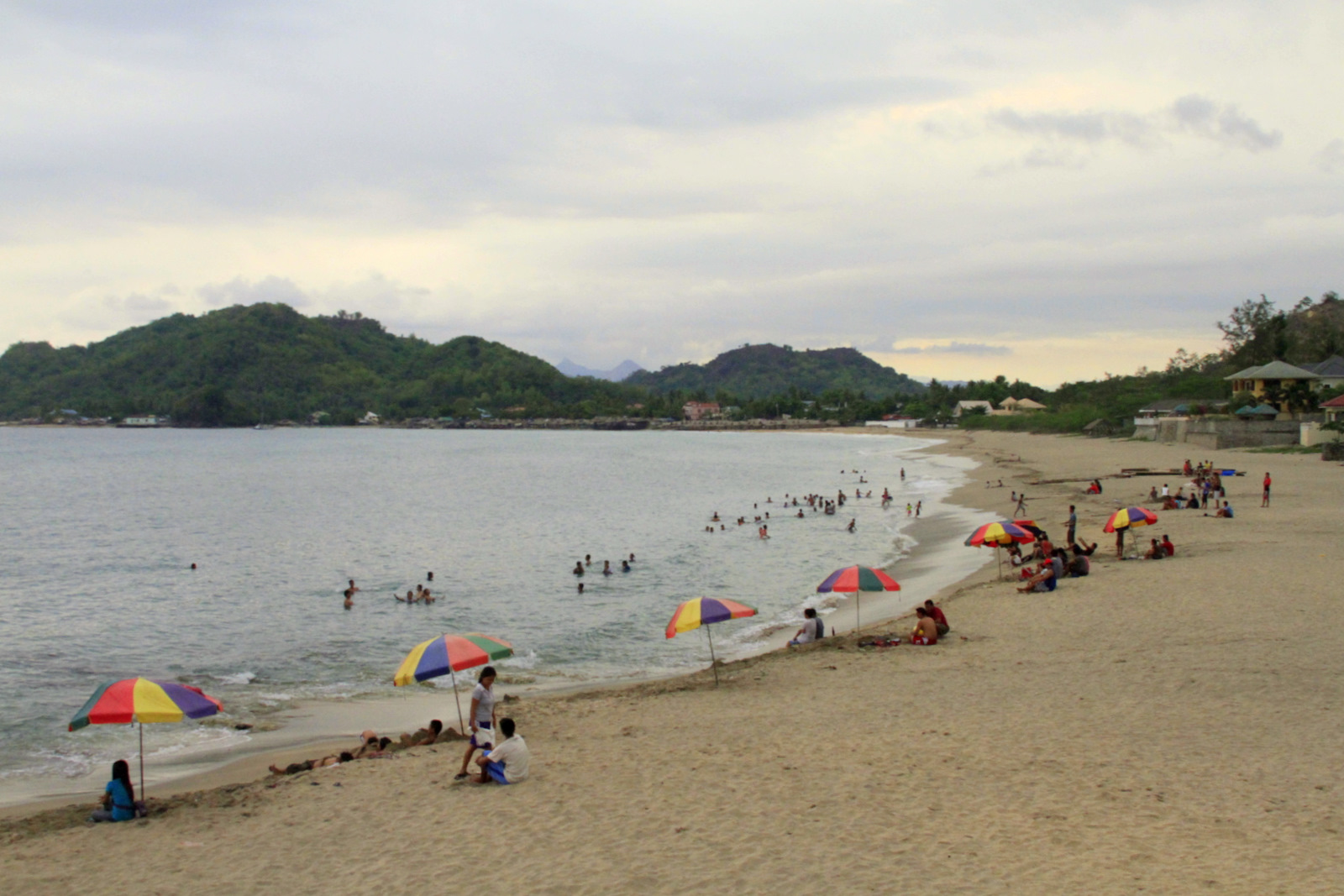
Suso Beach, Santa Maria, Ilocos Sur

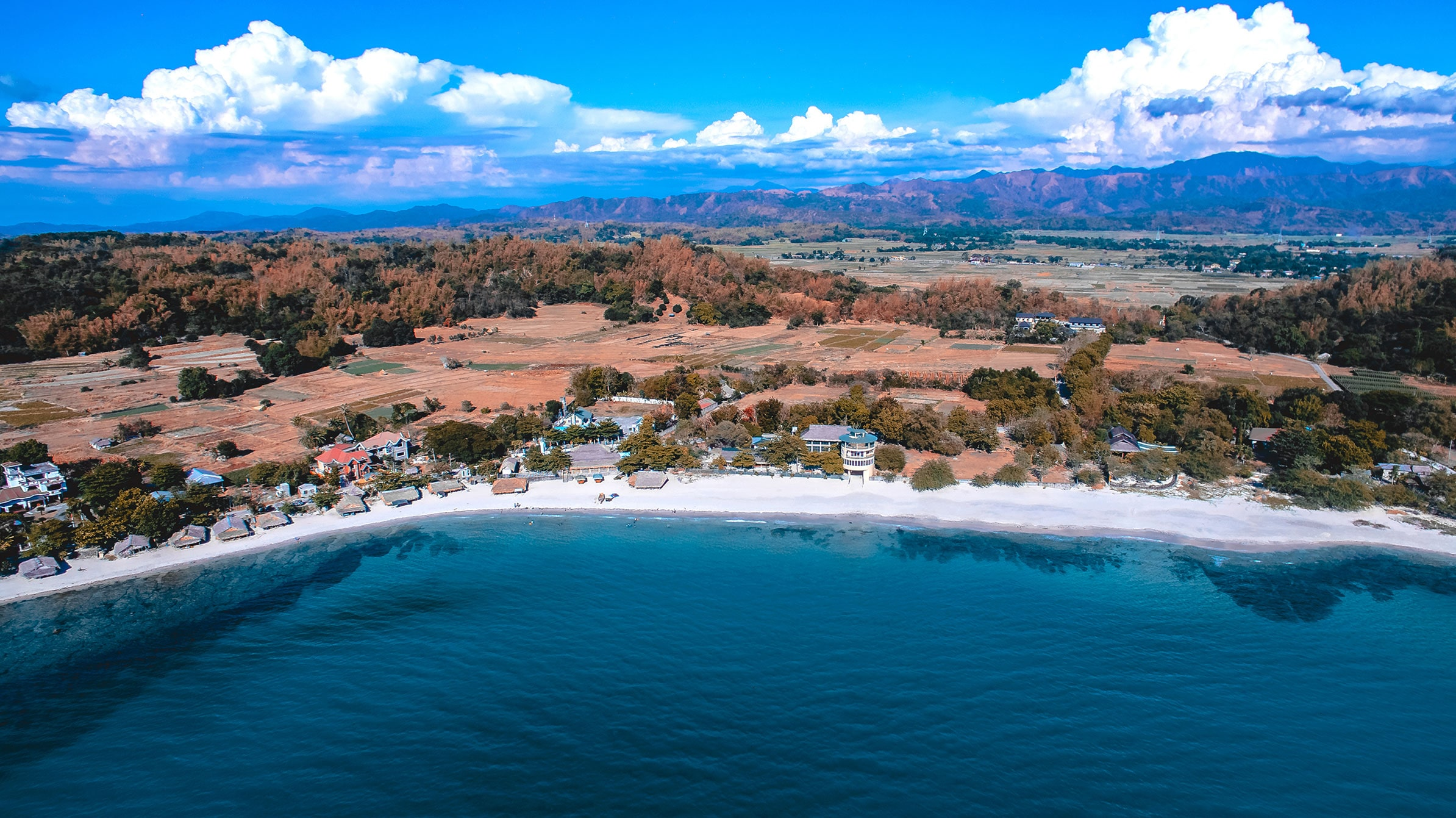
Cabangtalan Beach, Sinait, Ilocos Sur

- Cabugao
  - Pug-os Beach
  - Salomague Island
- Candon
  - Darapidap Beach
- Magsingal
  - Pinget Island
- Narvacan
  - Solvec Beach
- San Esteban
  - Apatot Beach
- Santa Maria
  - Nalvo Beach
  - Suso Beach
- Santiago
  - Ambucao Beach
  - Butol Beach
  - Gabao Beach
  - Sabangan Cove
- Sinait
  - Cabangtalan Beach
- Vigan
  - Mindoro Beach

=== La Union ===
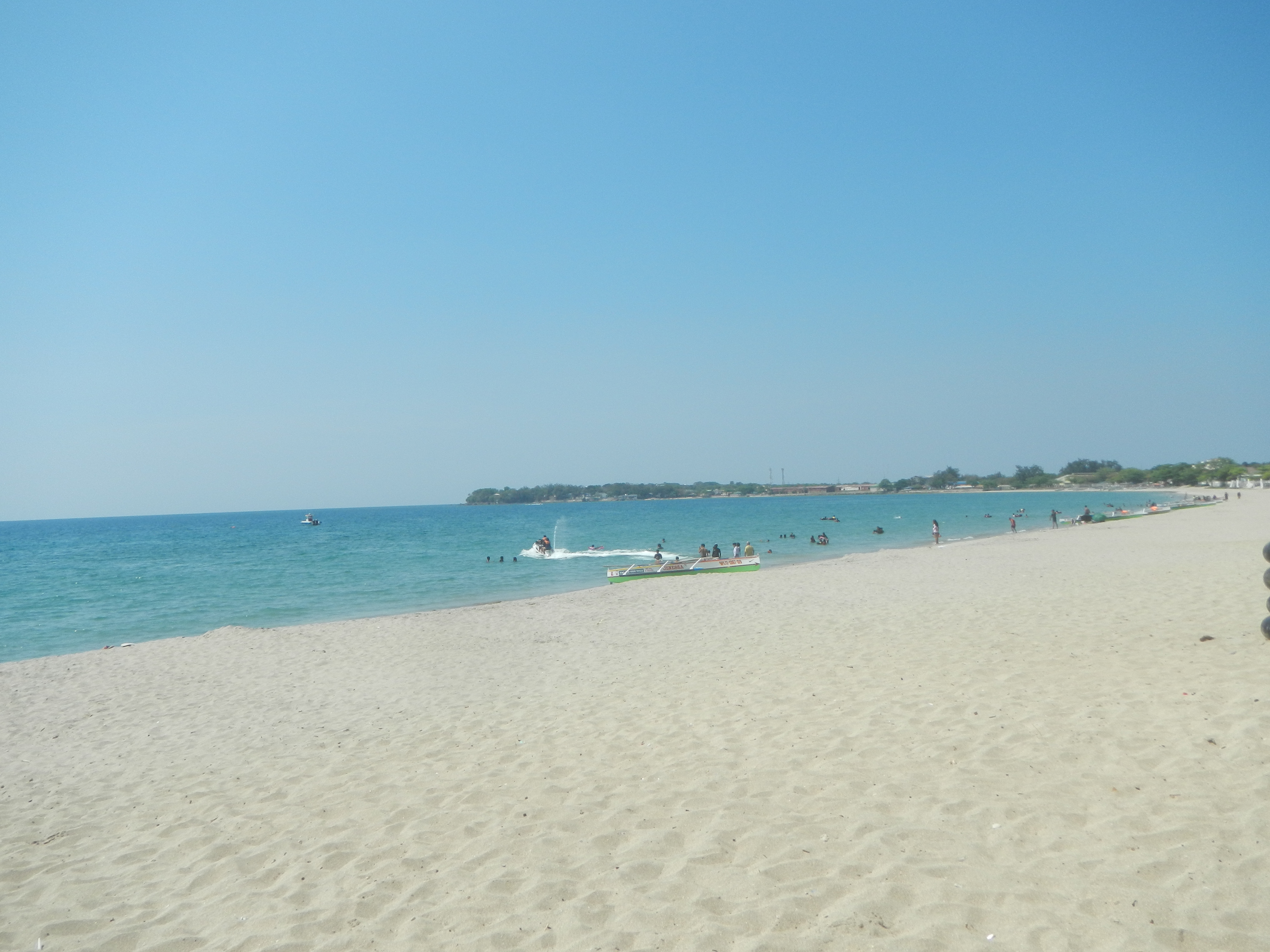
Canaoay Beach, San Fernando, La Union

- Bauang
  - Baccuit Sur Beach
  - Paringao Beach
  - Taberna Beach
- San Fernando
  - Canaoay Beach
  - Carlatan Beach
  - Poro Point
  - Wallace Beach
- San Juan
  - Panicsican Beach
  - Urbiztondo Beach

=== Pangasinan ===
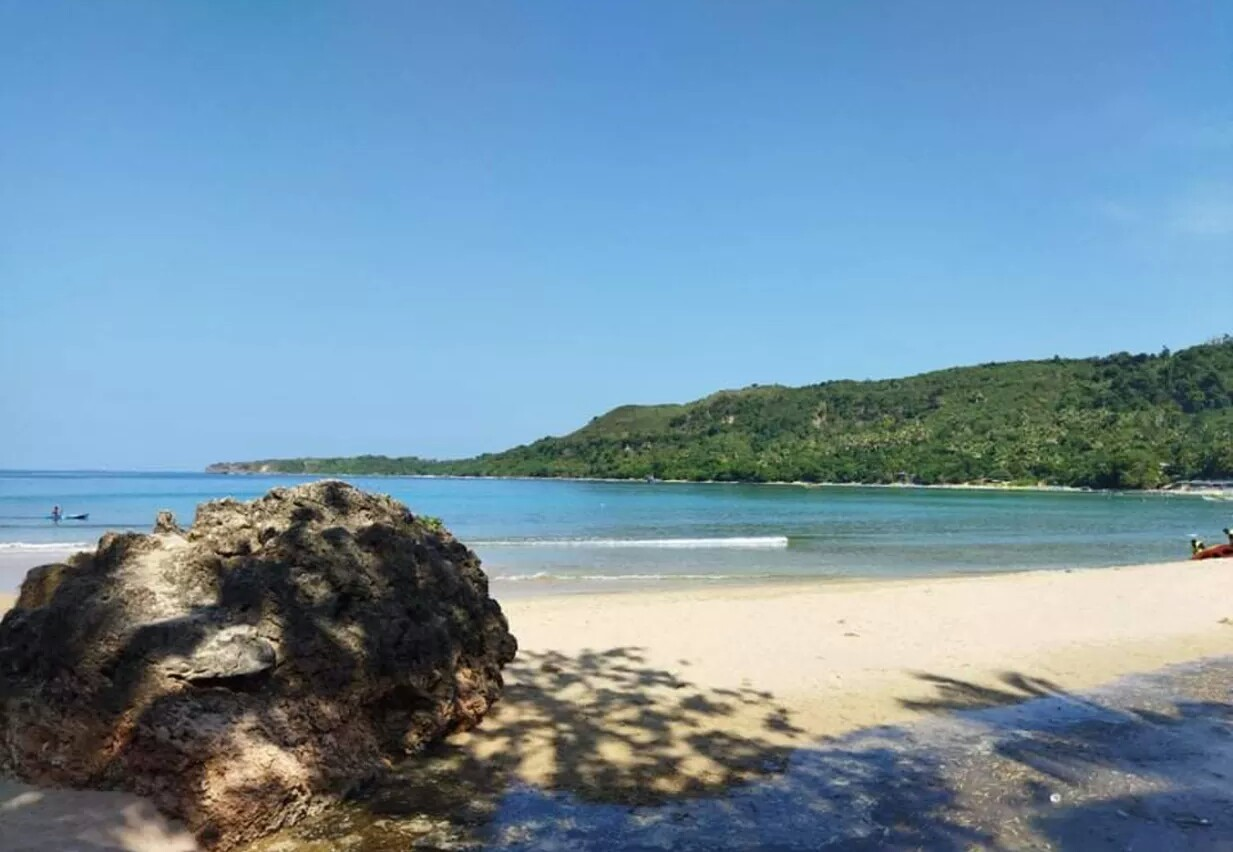
Abagatanen Beach, Agno, Pangasinan

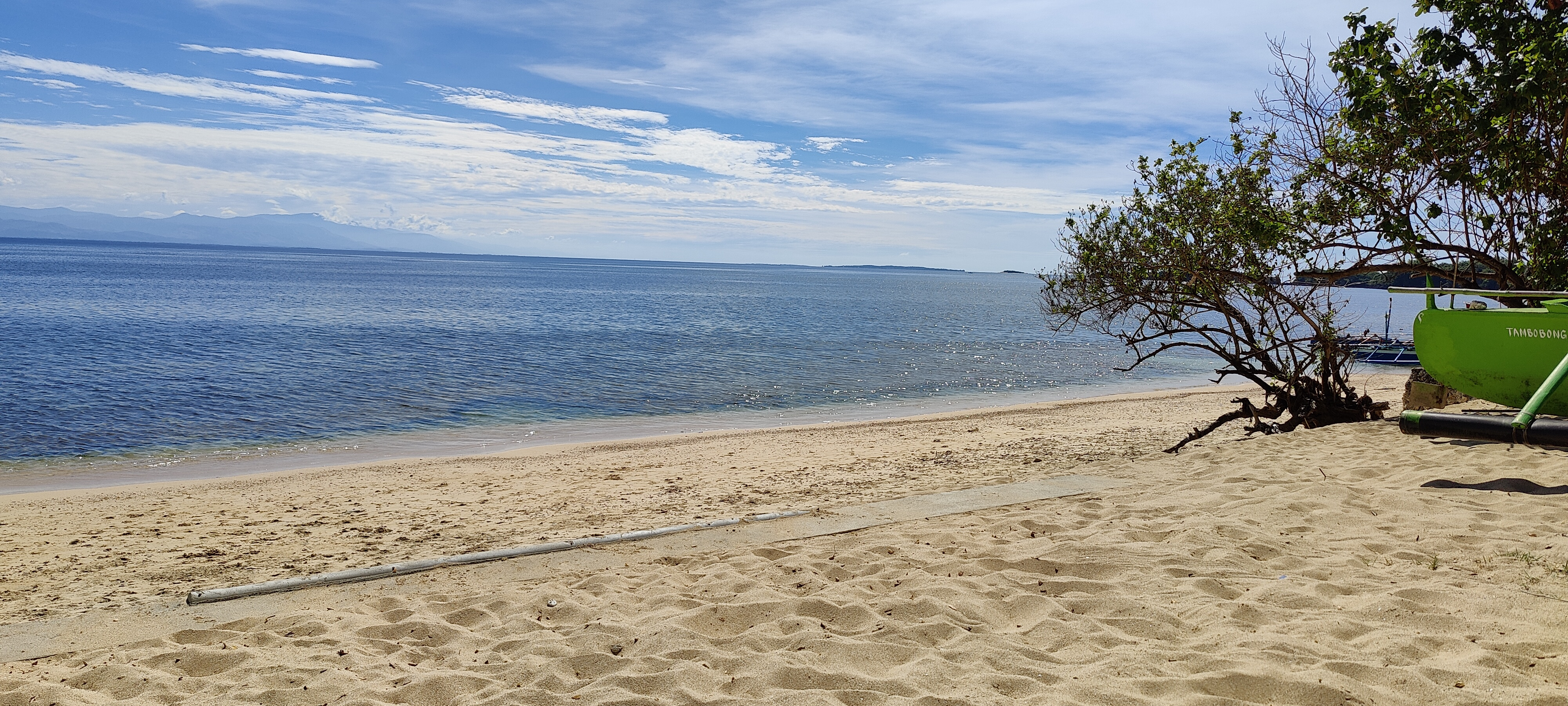
Tambobong Beach, Dasol, Pangasinan

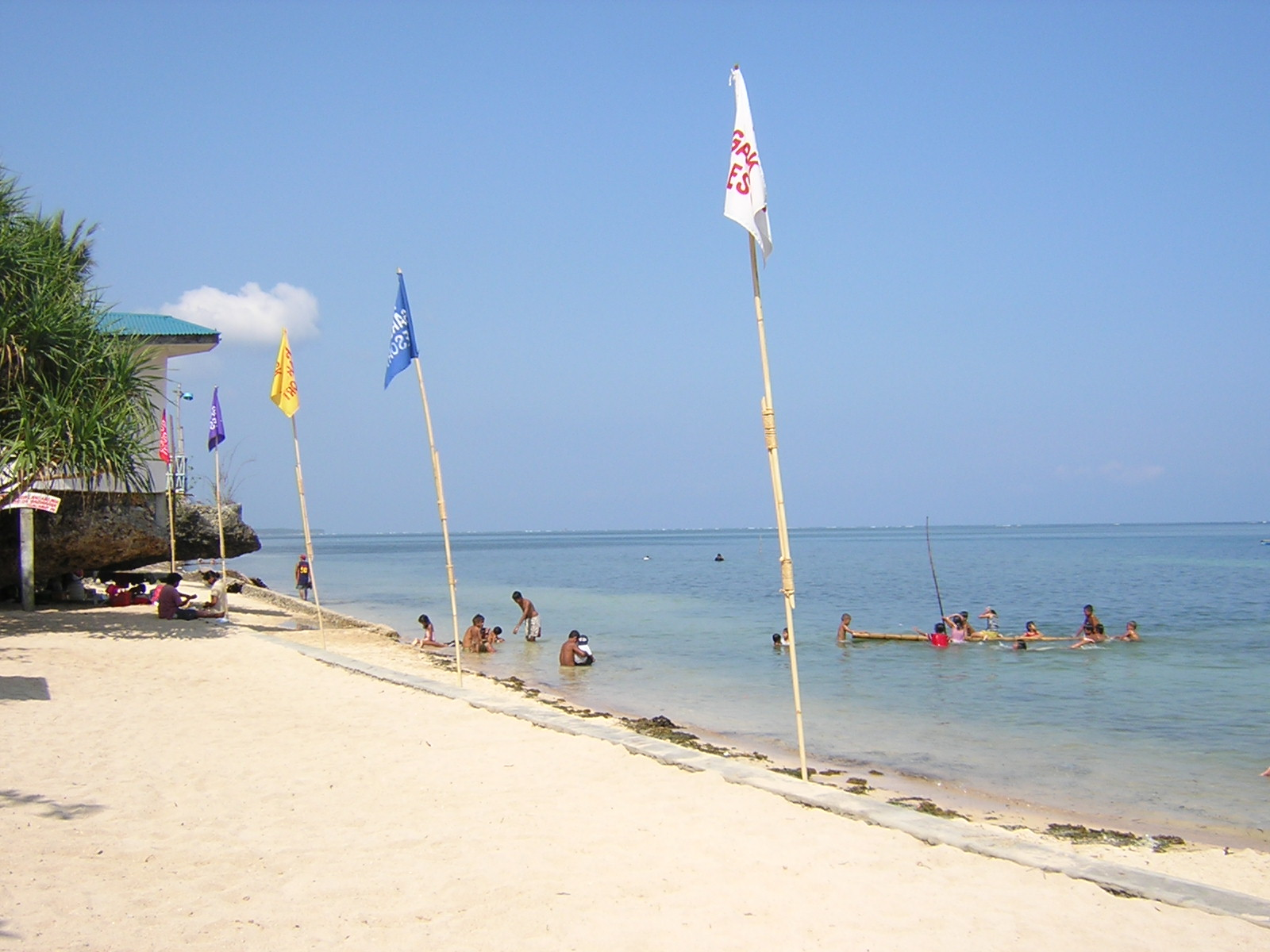
Patar Beach in Bolinao, Pangasinan

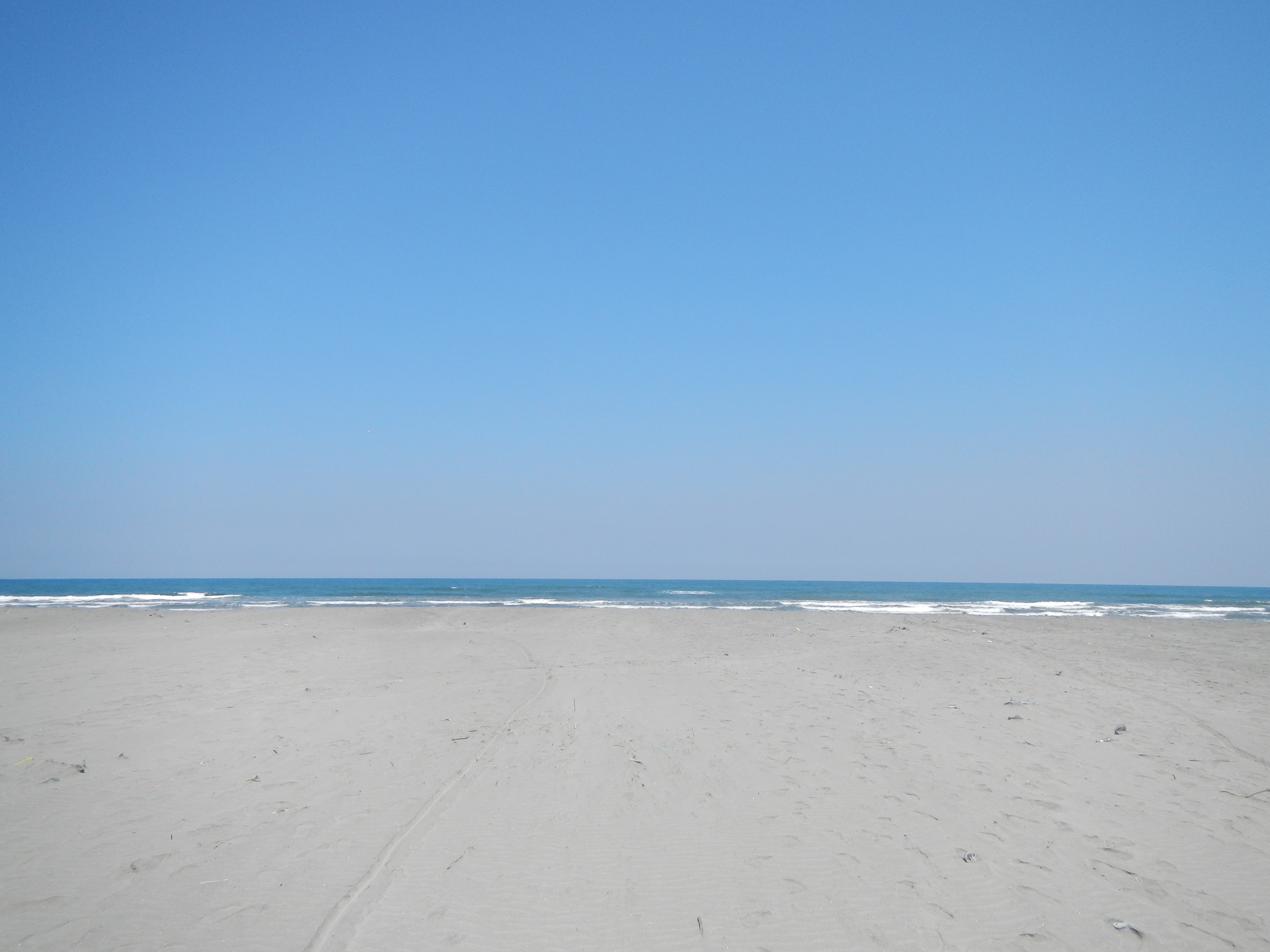
Lingayen Long Beach, Lingayen, Pangasinan

- Agno, Pangasinan
  - Abagatanen Beach
- Alaminos
  - Bolo Beach
  - Hundred Islands
- Anda
  - Tanduyong Island
  - Tondol Beach
- Bani
  - Olanen Beach
  - Surip Beach
- Binmaley
  - San Isidro Norte Beach
- Bolinao
  - Balingasay Beach
  - Ilog-Malino Beach
  - Patar Beach
  - Santiago Island
  - Silaqui Island
- Burgos
  - Cabongaoan Beach
- Dagupan
  - Bonuan Tondaligan Beach
  - Pugaro Beach
- Dasol
  - Balinmanok Beach
  - Colibra Island
  - Tambobong Beach
- Infanta
  - Balaki Island
  - Sabangan Beach
- Lingayen
  - Lingayen Long Beach
- San Fabian
  - Bolasi Beach
  - Center Beach
  - Mabilao Beach

== Bangsamoro Autonomous Region in Muslim Mindanao (BARMM) ==
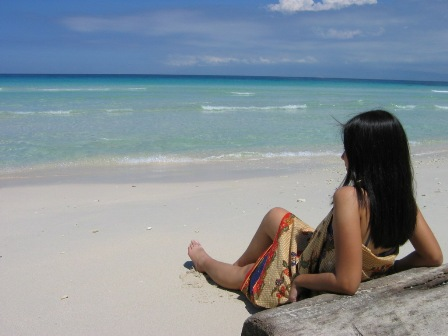
Malamawi Beach, Isabela

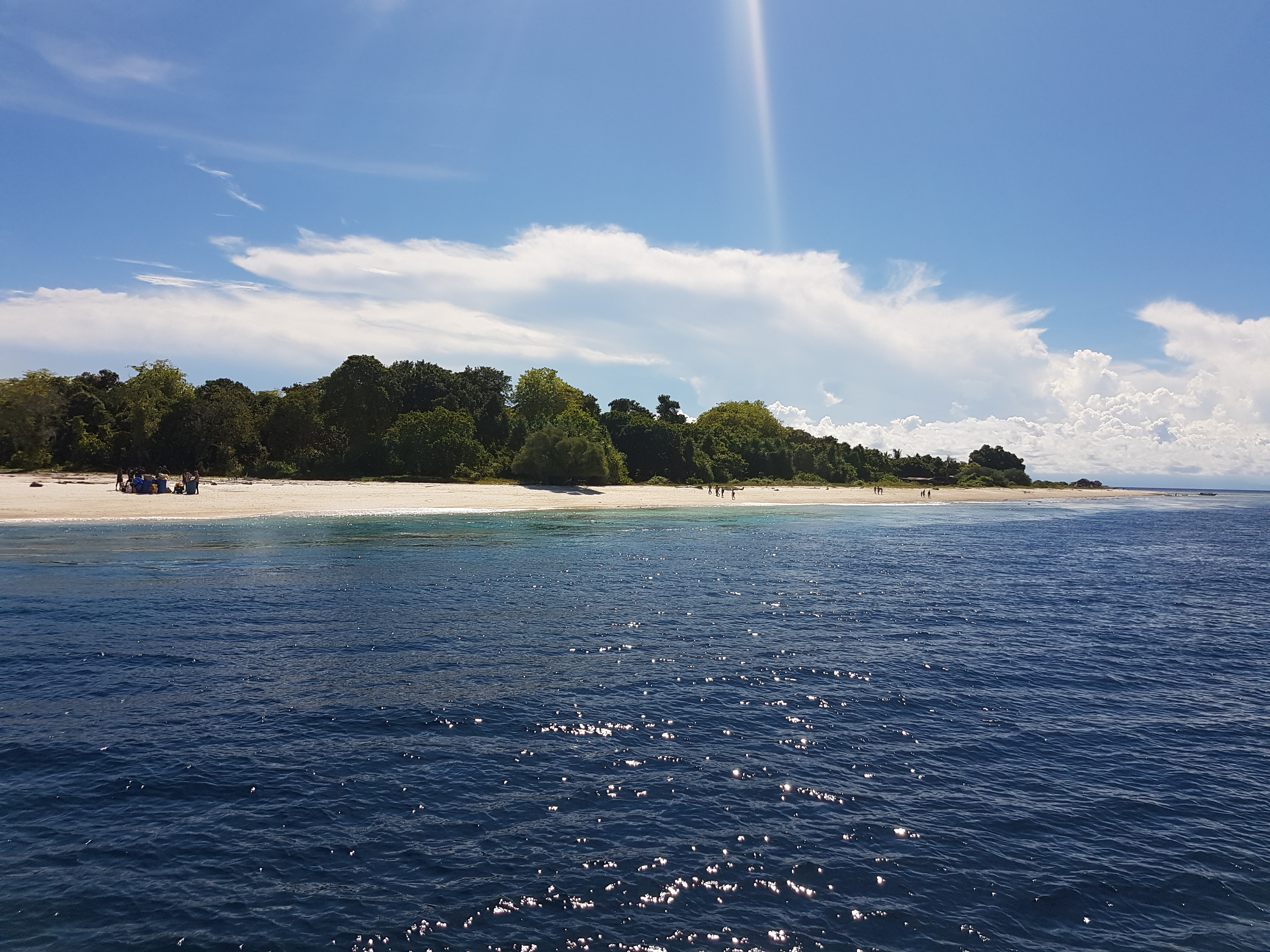
Panguan Island (Malamanok), Sitangkai, Tawi-Tawi

=== Basilan ===
- Isabela
  - Malamawi Island
  - Sumagdang Beach

=== Sulu ===
- Jolo
  - Marungas Island
- Patikul
  - Maubo Beach

=== Tawi-Tawi ===
- Mapun
  - Gusong Reef
- Sapa-Sapa
  - Panampangan Island
- Sitangkai
  - Mardanas Island
  - Panguan Island (Malamanok)
- Turtle Islands
  - Turtle Islands National Park

== National Capital Region ==
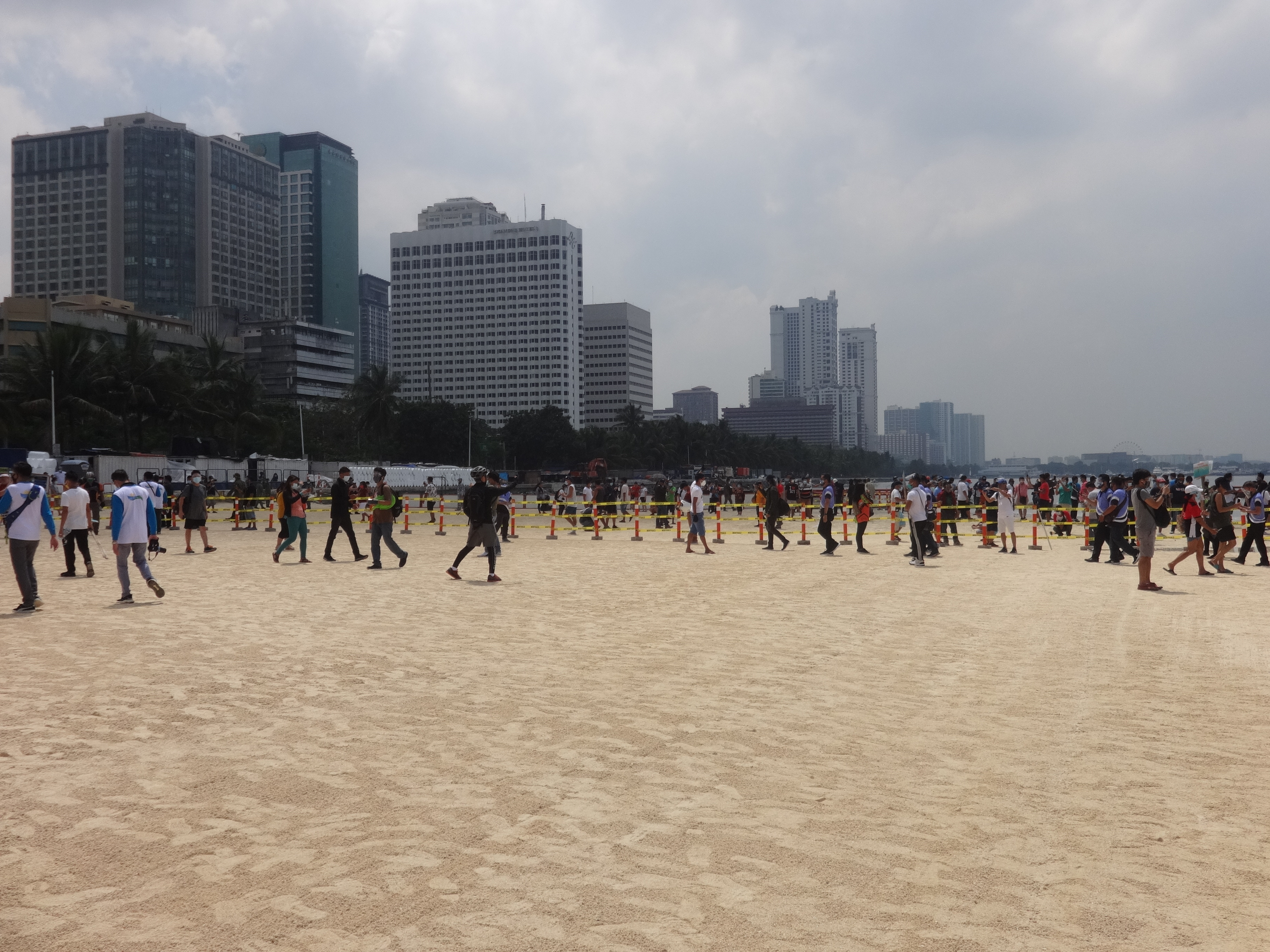
Manila Baywalk Dolomite Beach in Roxas Boulevard, Manila

=== City of Manila ===
- Roxas Boulevard, Manila
  - Manila Baywalk Dolomite Beach

== Negros Island ==
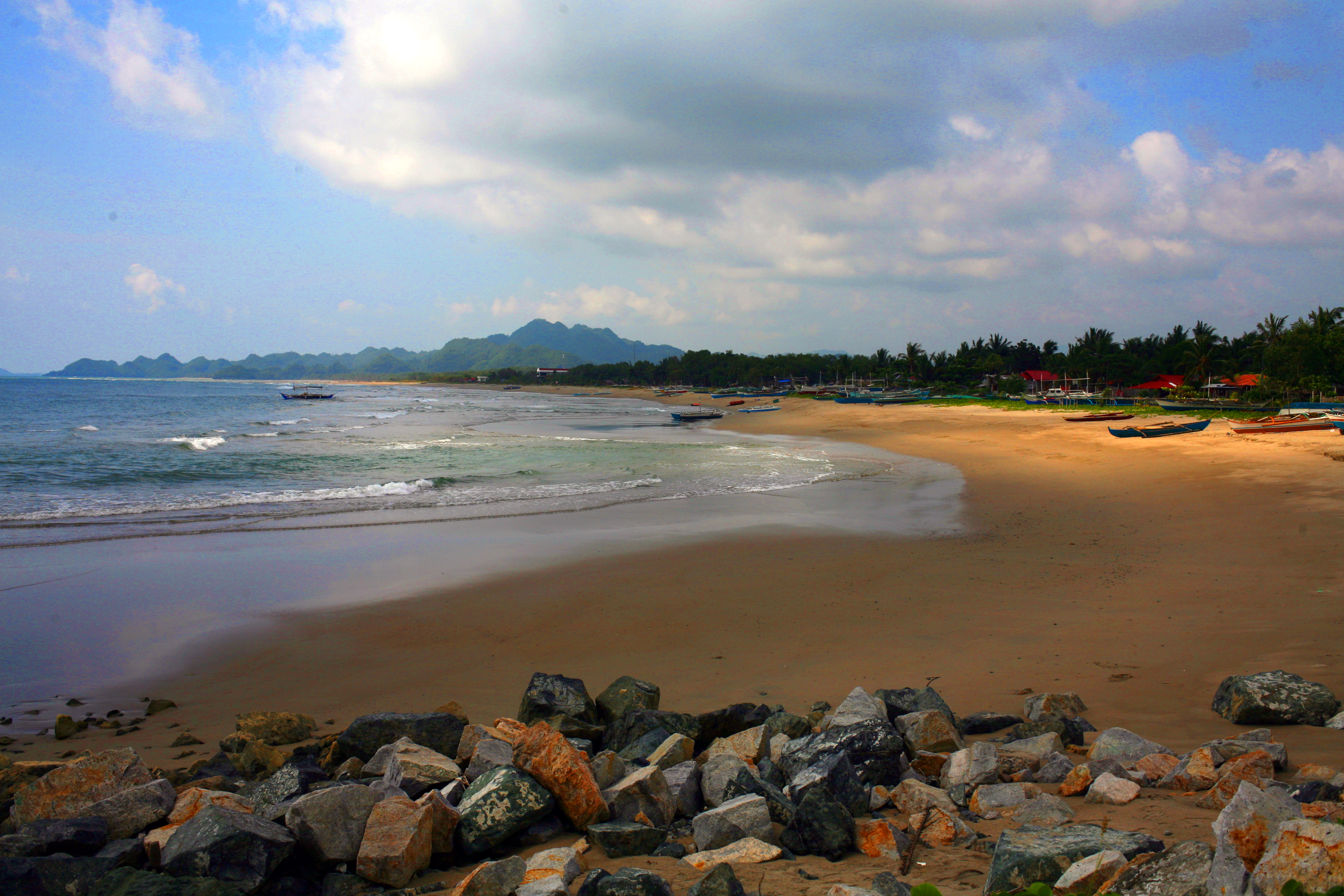
Beach in Sipalay, Negros Occidental

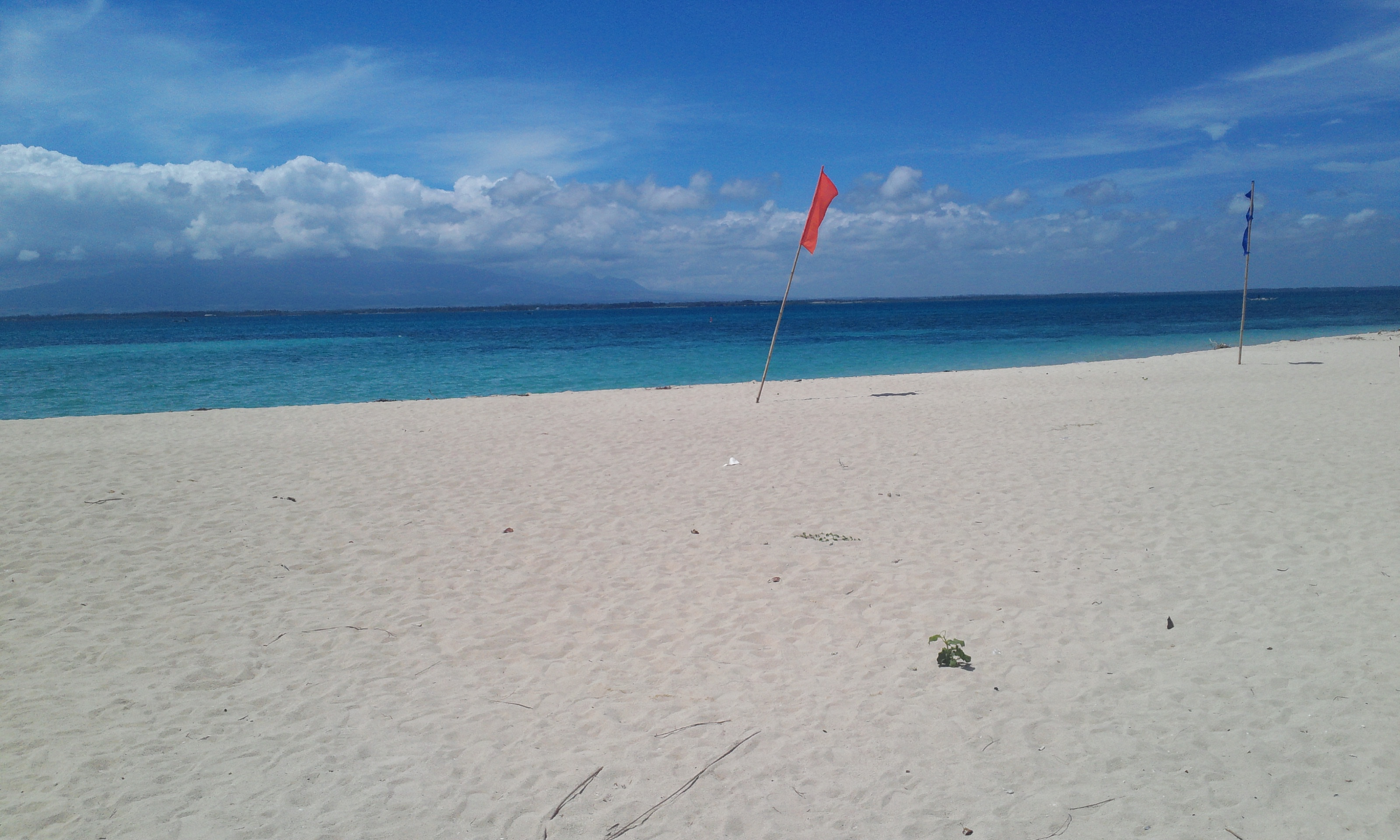
Lakawon Island of Cadiz, Negros Occidental

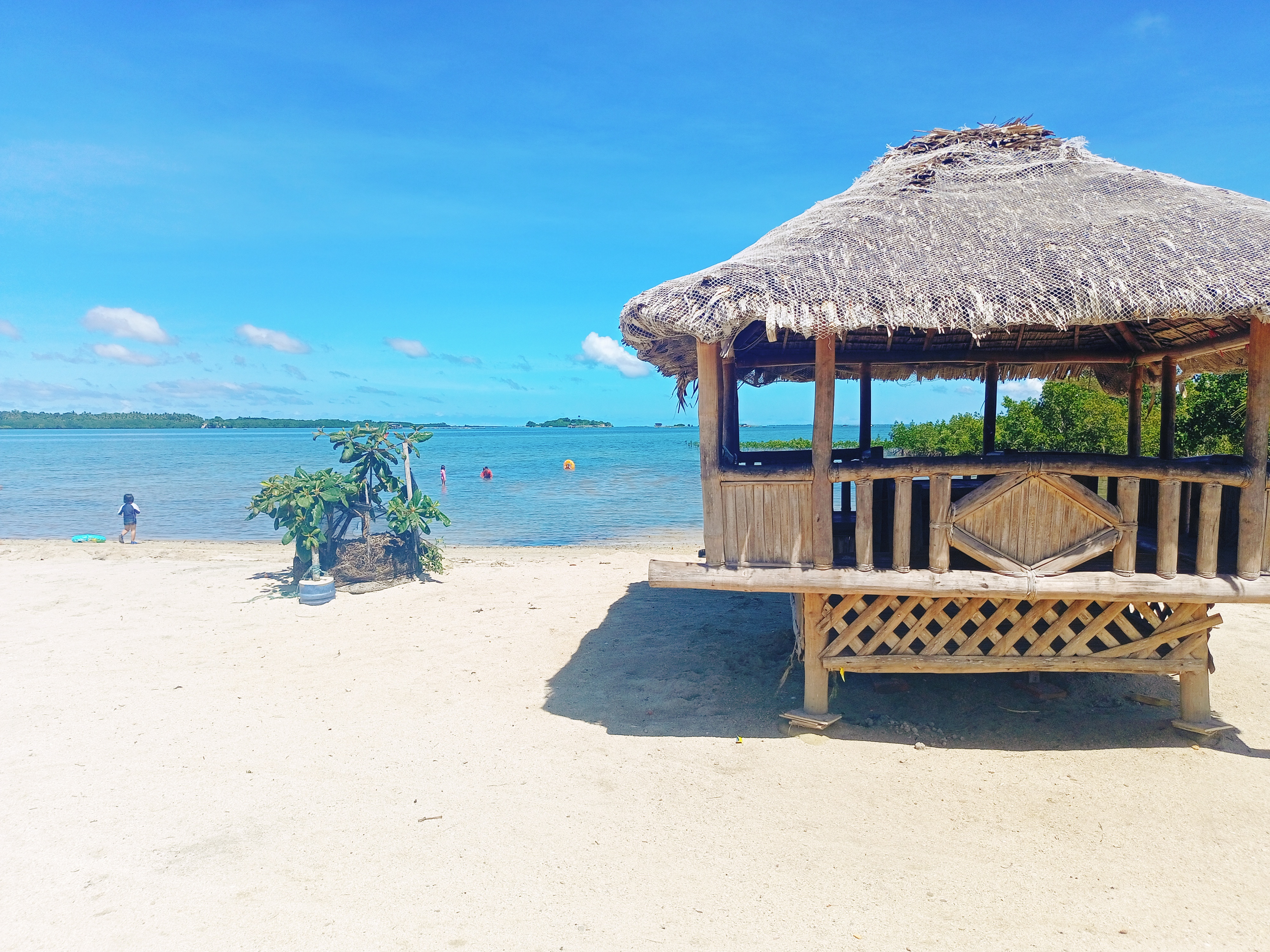
Marino Del Norte Beach of Escalante, Negros Occidental

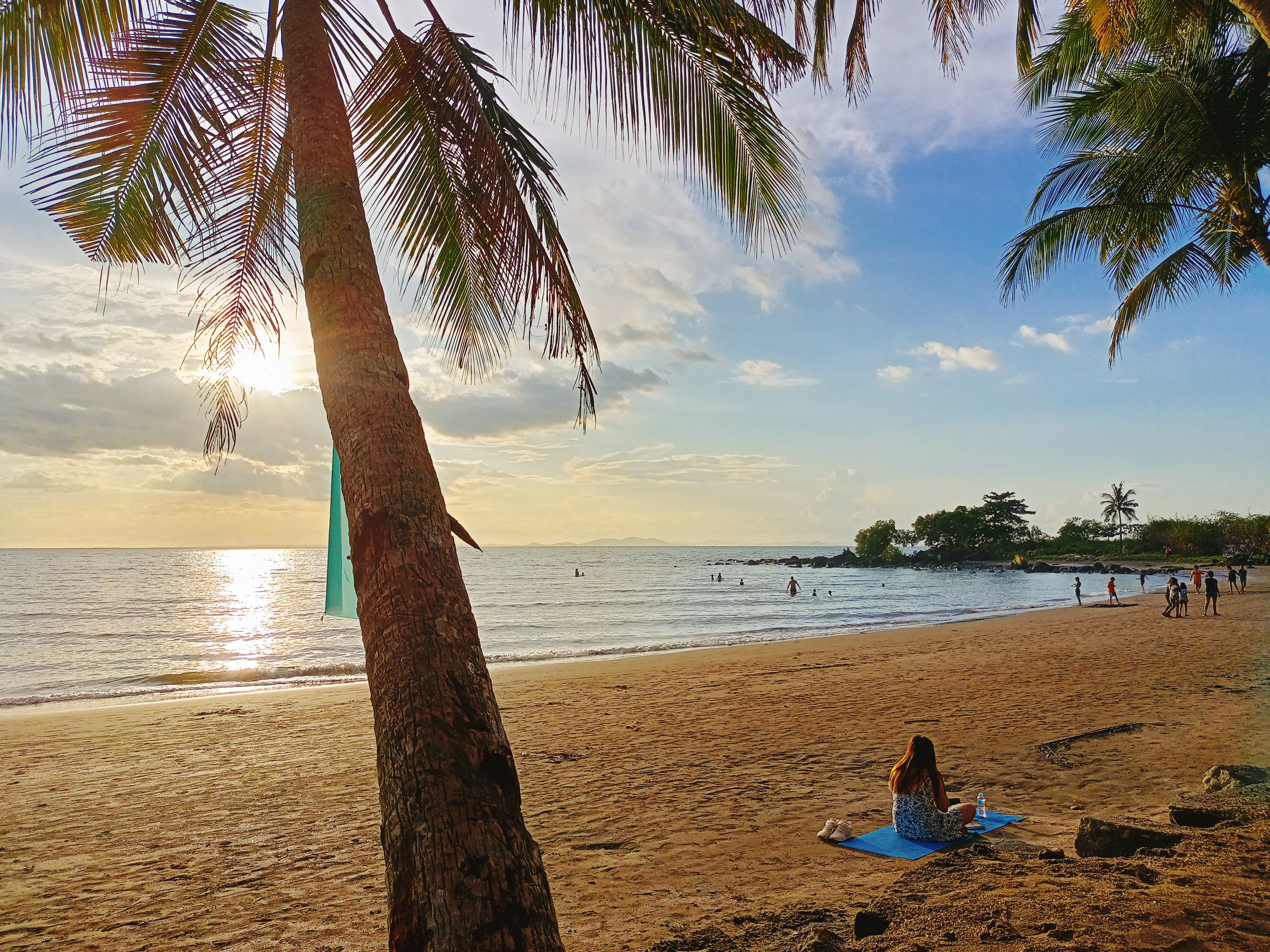
Royal Villa Beach of Pontevedra, Negros Occidental

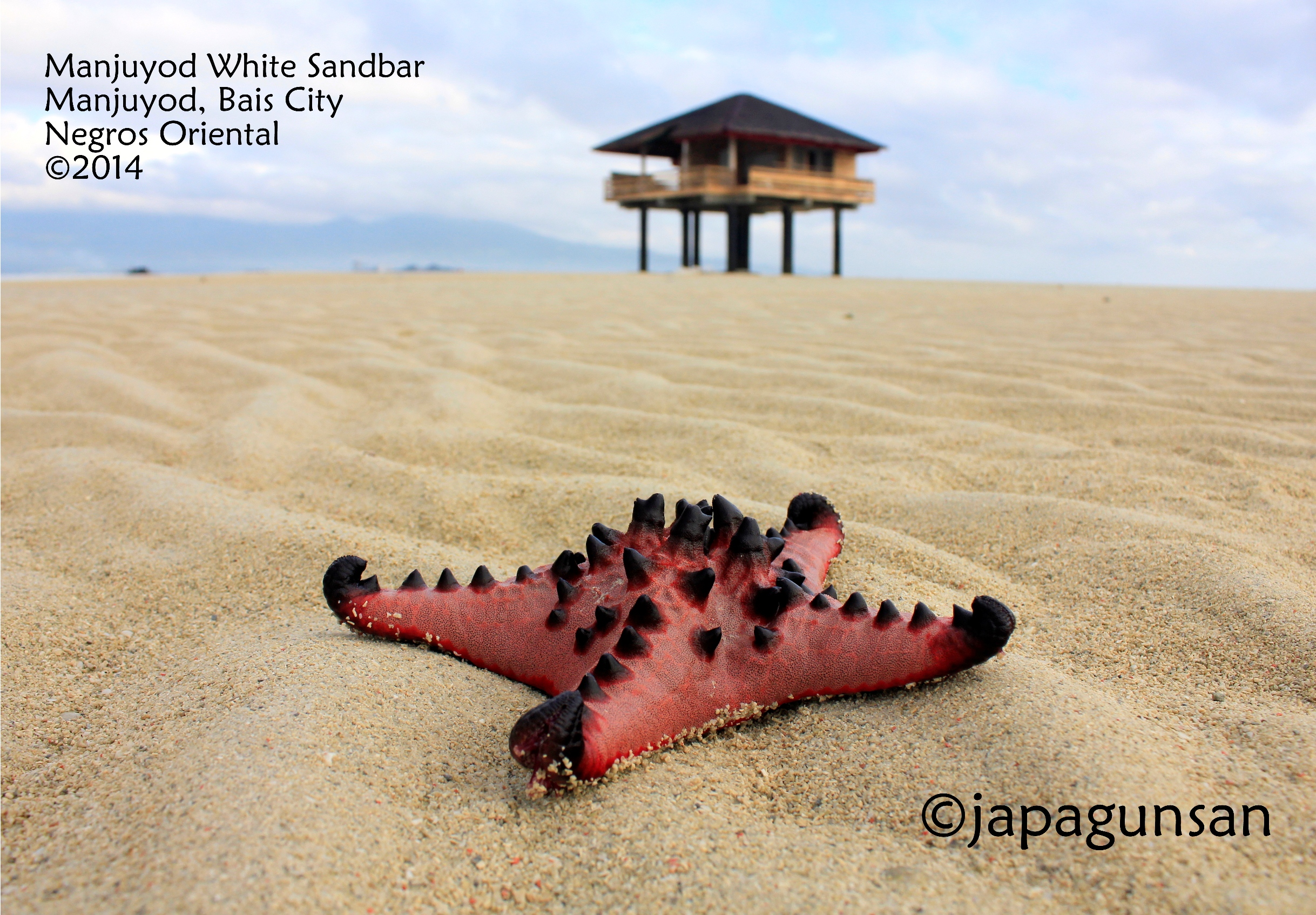
Manjuyod White Sandbar in Manjuyod, Negros Oriental

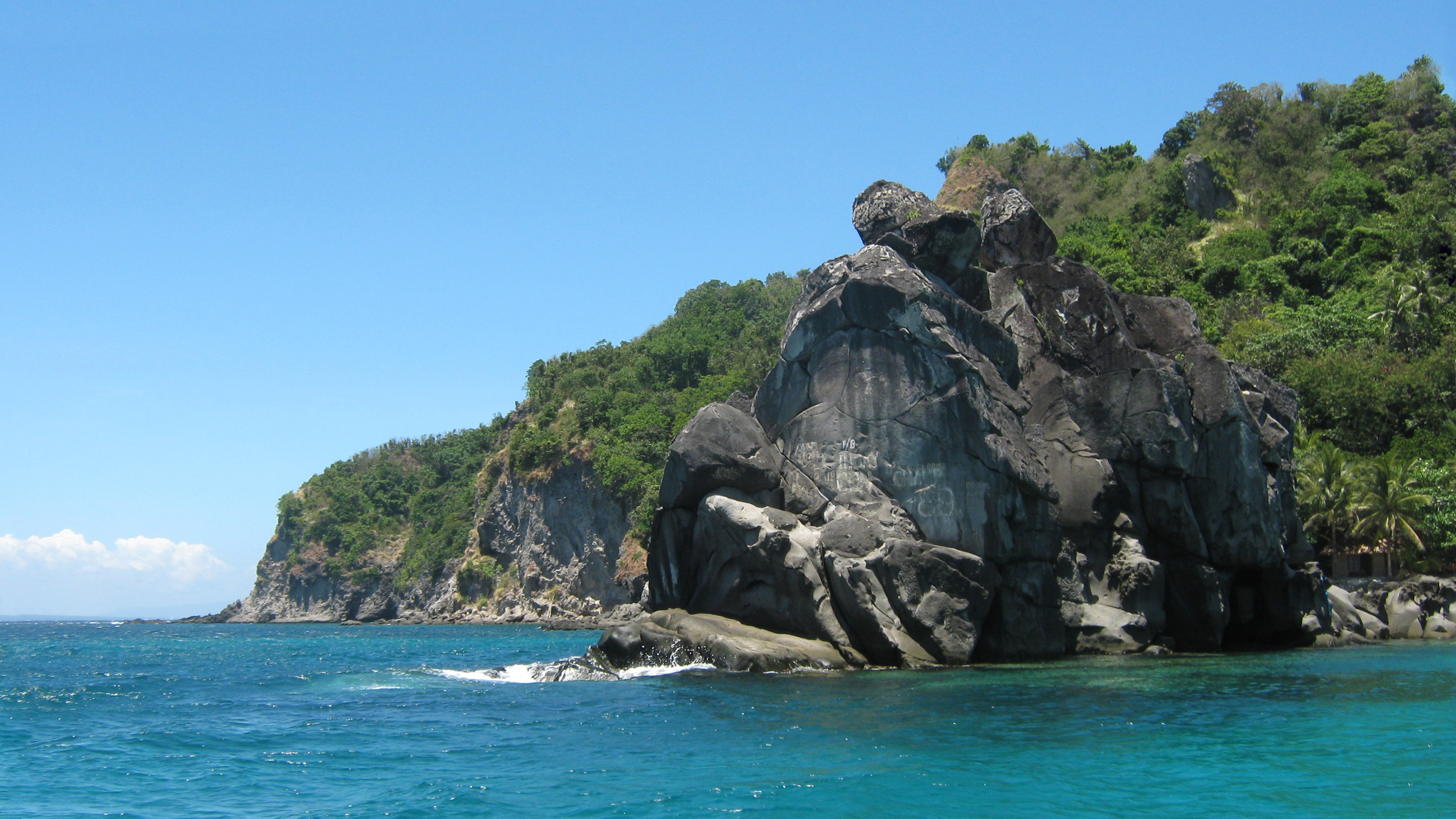
Rock formations at the boat landing area in Apo Island, Negros Oriental.

=== Negros Occidental ===
- Cadiz
  - Lakawon Island
  - Sicaba Beach
- Calatrava
  - Palau Beach
- Cauayan
  - Bulata Island
  - Danjugan Island
  - Punta Bulata
- Escalante
  - Jomabo Island
  - Marino Del Norte Beach
- Hinoba-an
  - Bolila Island
- Pontevedra
  - Balangigay Beach
  - Royal Villa Beach
- Sagay
  - Molocaboc Island
- San Carlos
  - Refugio Island
- Sipalay
  - Campomanes Beach
  - Langub Beach
  - Punta Ballo

=== Negros Oriental ===
- Bais
  - Lag-it Beach purok talisay
  - Mapao Sand Bar
  - Talabong Island
- Dauin
  - Apo Island
  - Atmosphere Resorts Beach
- La Libertad
  - San Jose Beach
- Manjuyod
  - Manjuyod Sand Bar
- Siaton
  - Antulang Beach
  - Tambobo Beach
- Zamboanguita
  - Talatha Beach

== Northern Mindanao ==
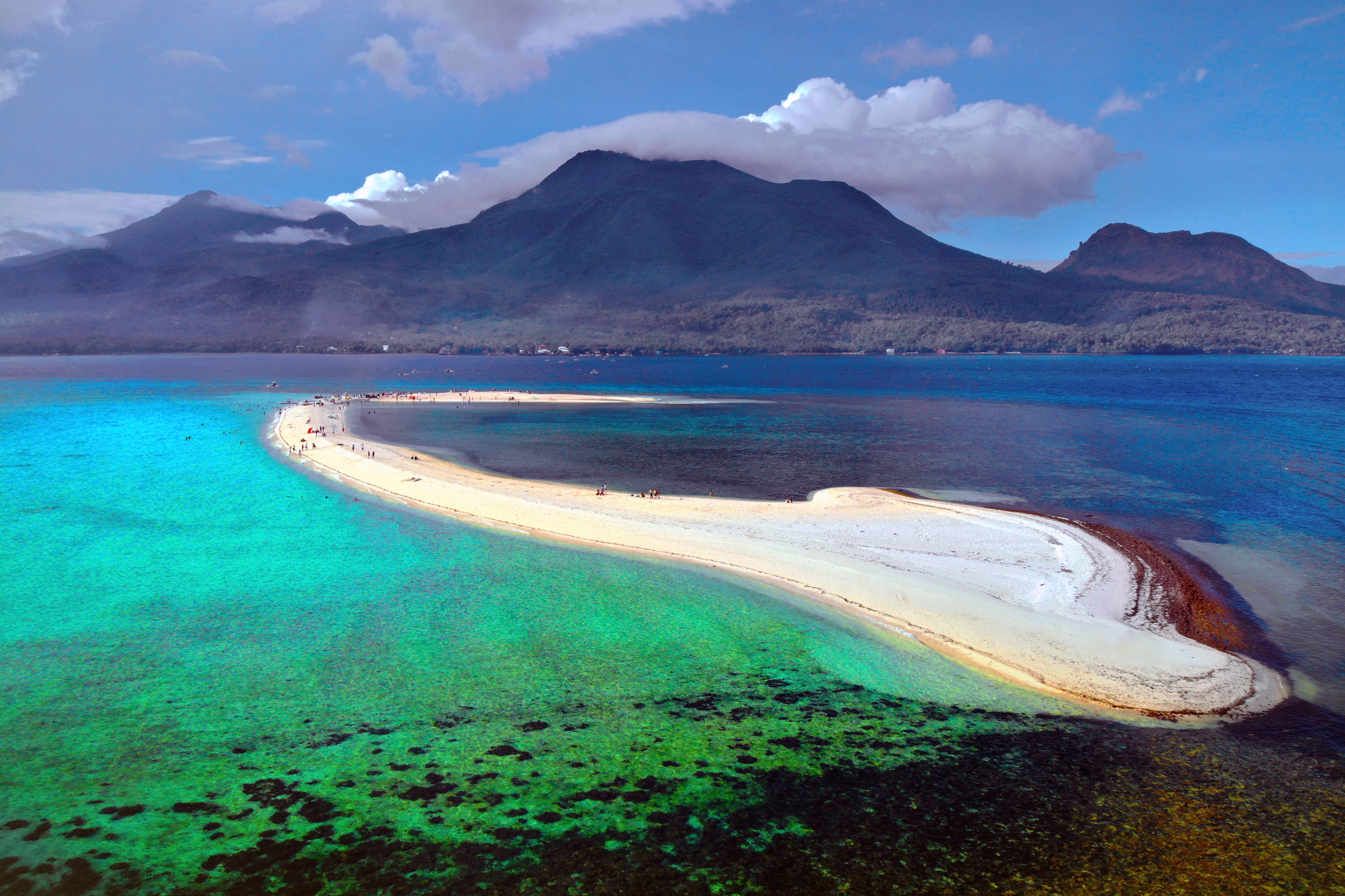
White Island, Mambajao, Camiguin

=== Camiguin ===
- Guinsiliban
  - Kabila Beach
- Mahinog
  - Mantigue Island
- Mambajao
  - Agoho Beach
  - White Island

=== Lanao del Norte ===
- Bacolod
  - Rupagan Beach
- Maigo
  - Balagatasa Beach
- Sultan Naga Dimaporo
  - Pikalawag Beach

=== Misamis Occidental ===
- Baliangao
  - Cabgan (Oklahoma) Island
  - Palmera Beach
  - Sunrise Beach
- Clarin
  - Lupagan Beach
- Jimenez
  - Palilan Beach
- Panaon
  - Dela Paz Beach
  - Regalado's Beach Resort
- Lopez Jaena
  - Capayas Island
  - Mansabay Beach
- Oroquieta
  - El Triunfo Beach
  - Romero Beach
  - San Vicente Alto Beach
- Plaridel
  - Bao-Baon (Seven) Islands
- Sapang Dalaga
  - Naputhaw Island
  - Pulang Bato Beach
- Sinacaban
  - Dolphin Island
- Tangub
  - Maloro Beach

=== Misamis Oriental ===
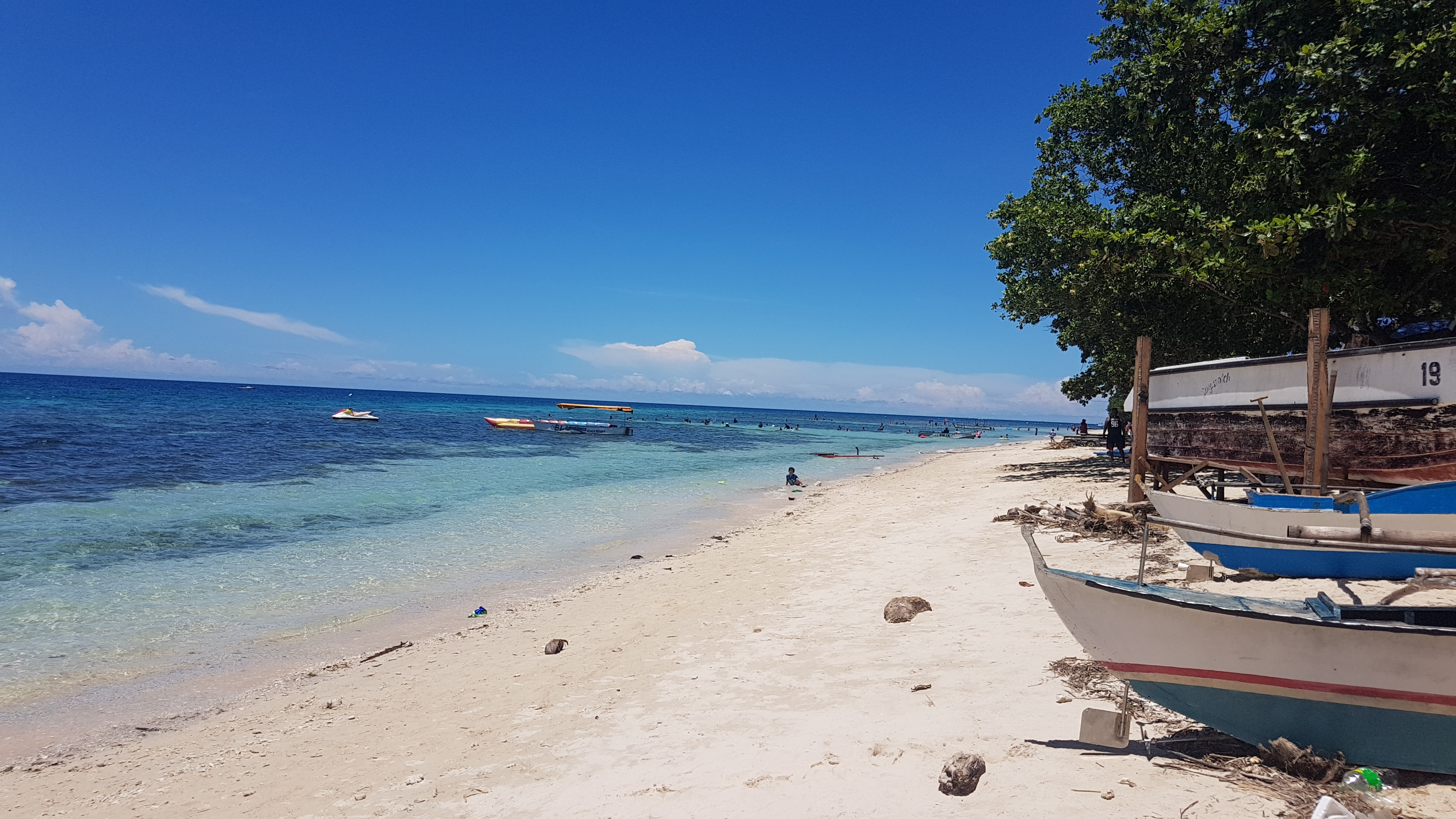
Initao Beach, Misamis Oriental

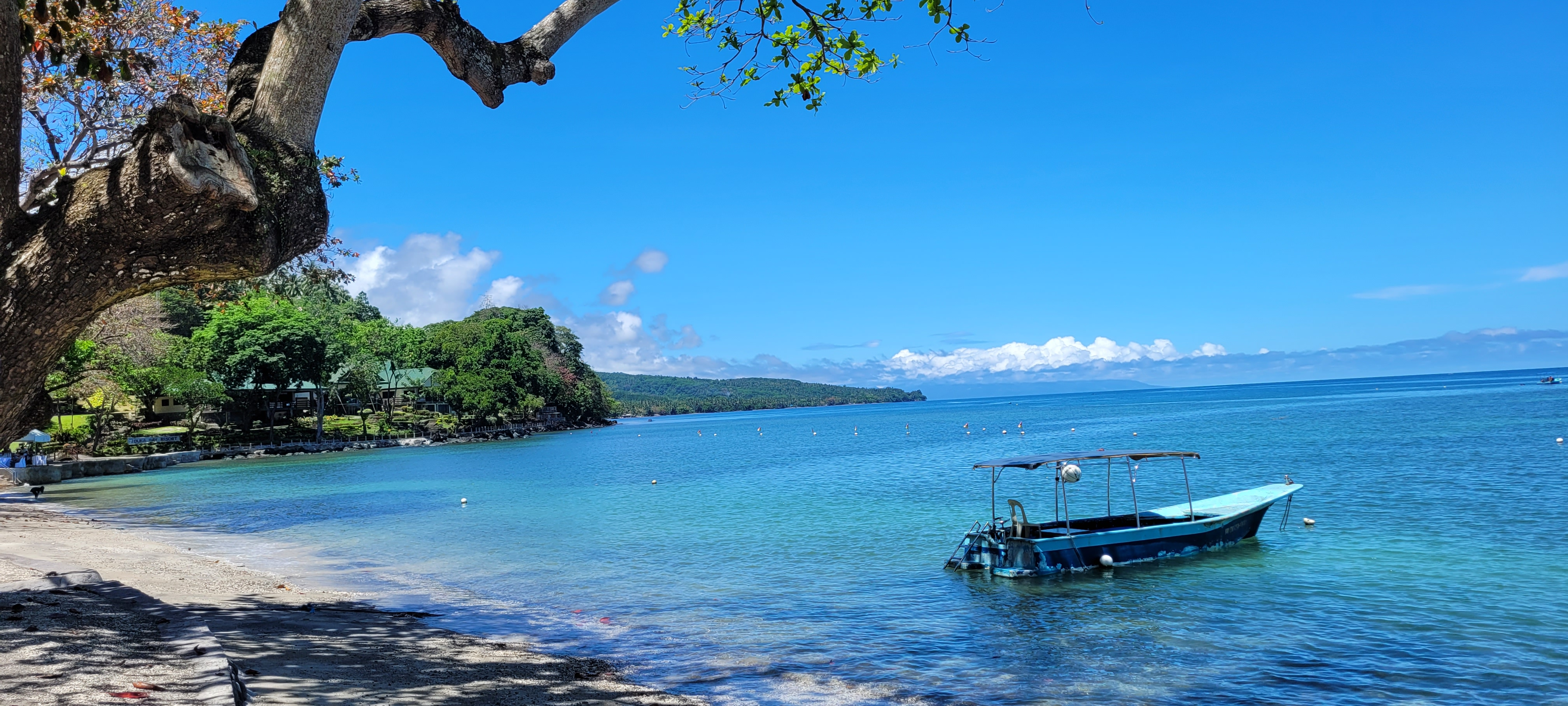
Duka Beach in Medina, Misamis Oriental

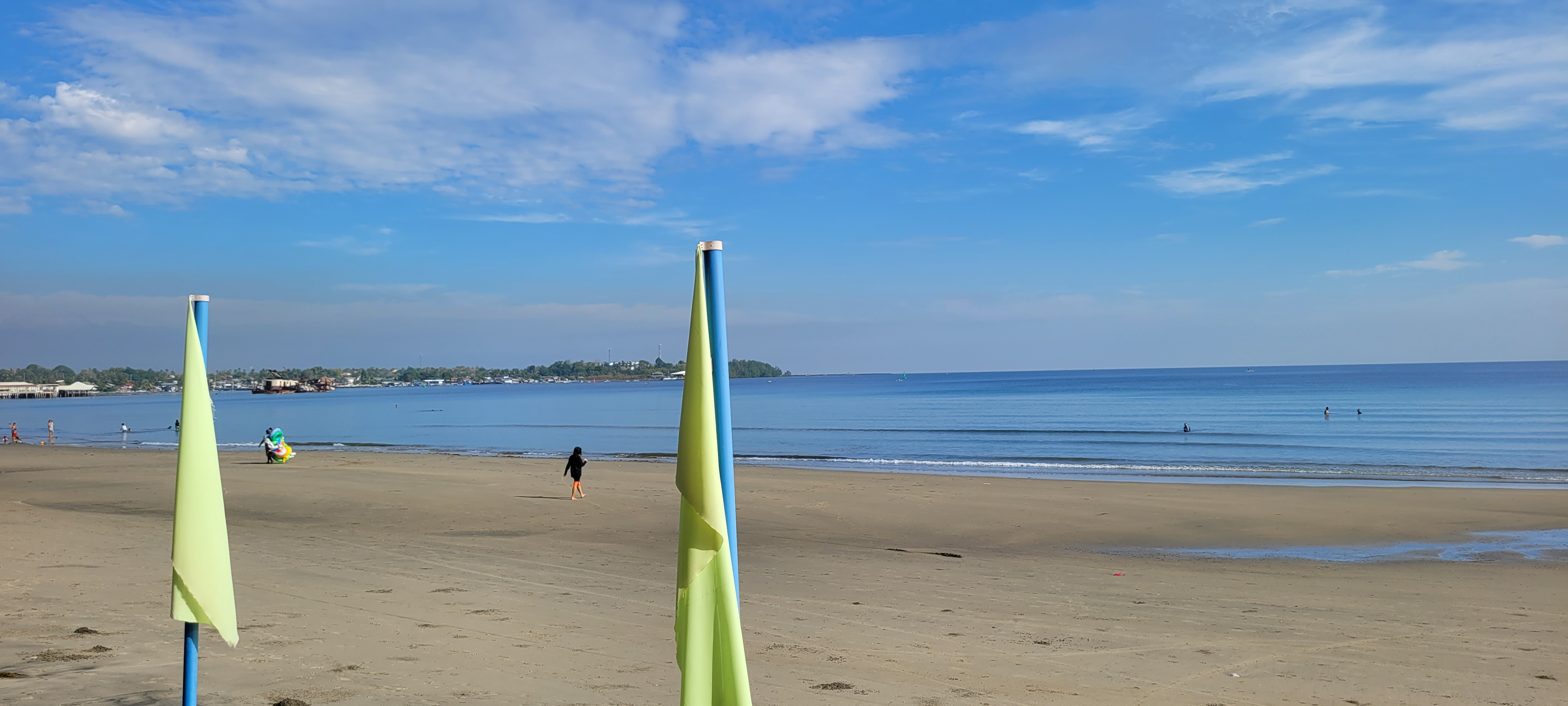
Taboc Beach in Opol, Misamis Oriental

- Balingasag
  - Mambayaan Beach
- Balingoan
  - Mantangale Alibuag Beach
  - Palma Beach
- Binuangan
  - Mempepe Beach
  - Saint Bernadette Beach
- Cagayan de Oro
  - Gemini Beach
  - Gusa Beach
- El Salvador
  - Molugan Beach
  - Molugan Shoal
- Gingoog
  - Badiangon Beach
- Initao
  - Bubotan Beach
- Jasaan
  - Agutayan Island
  - Punta Gorda Beach
- Kinoguitan
  - Bolisong Beach
- Lagonglong
  - Kauswagan Beach
- Laguindingan
  - Birhen Milagrosa Beach
- Manticao
  - Punta Silum Beach
- Medina
  - Duka Beach
- Naawan
  - Maputi Beach
- Opol
  - Taboc Beach
- Salay
  - Limpatugao Beach
- Sugbongcogon
  - Alibuag Beach
  - Alicomohan Beach
  - Kiraging Beach
- Talisay
  - Kalamkam Beach
  - Talines Beach
- Villanueva
  - Looc Beach

== Mimaropa ==
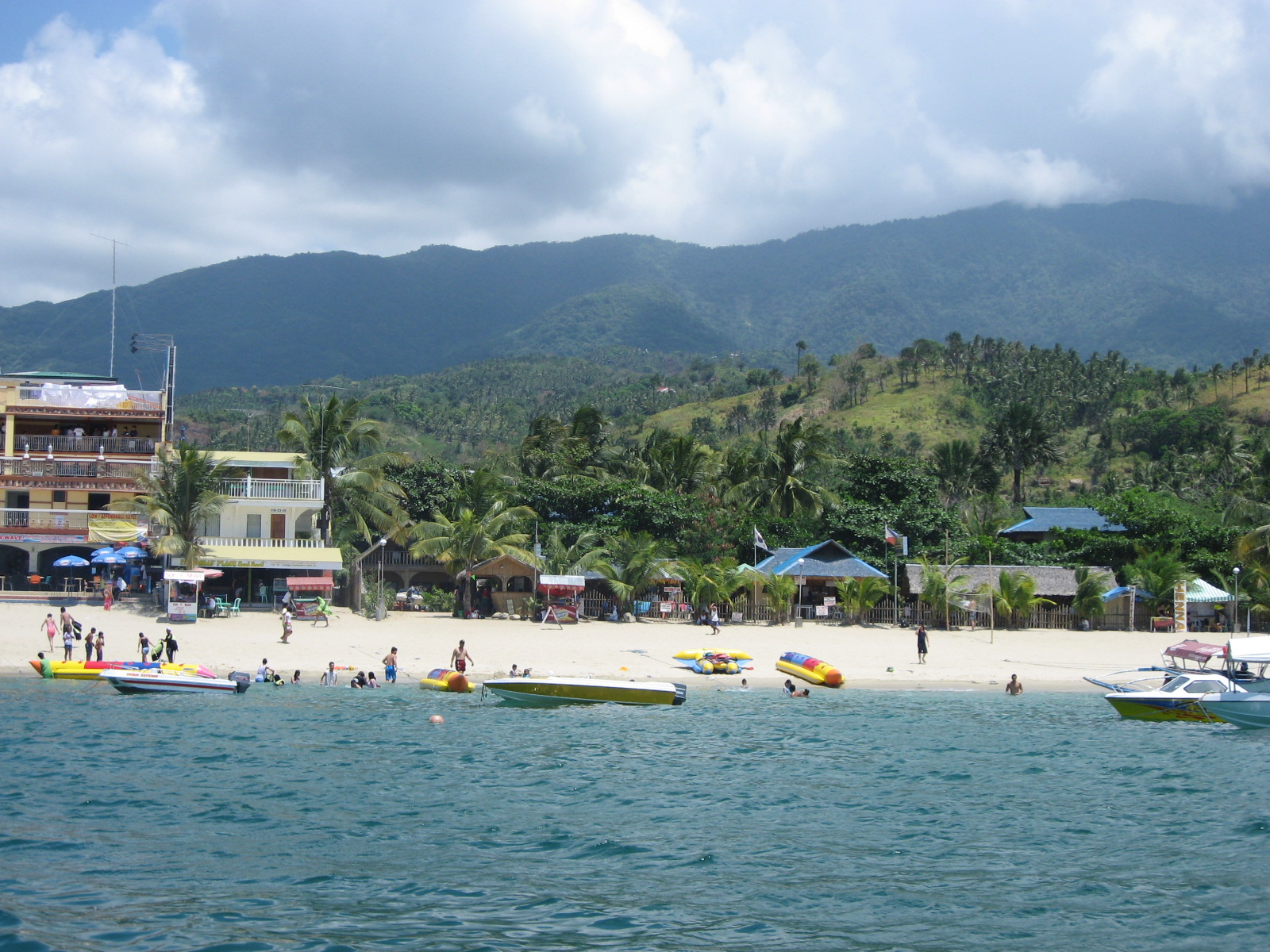
White Beach in Puerto Galera, Mindoro Oriental

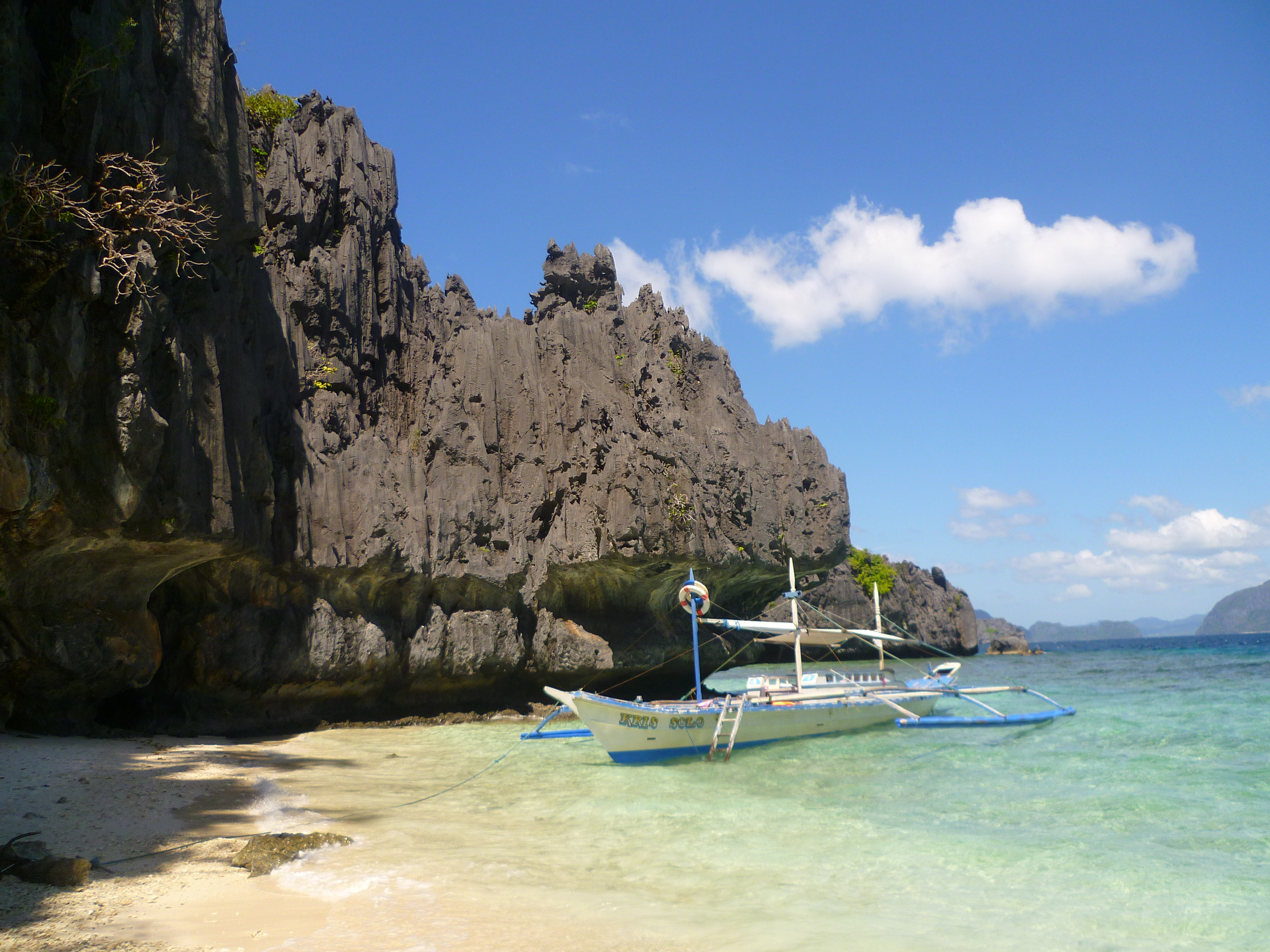
El Nido, Palawan

Buena Suerte, Palawan

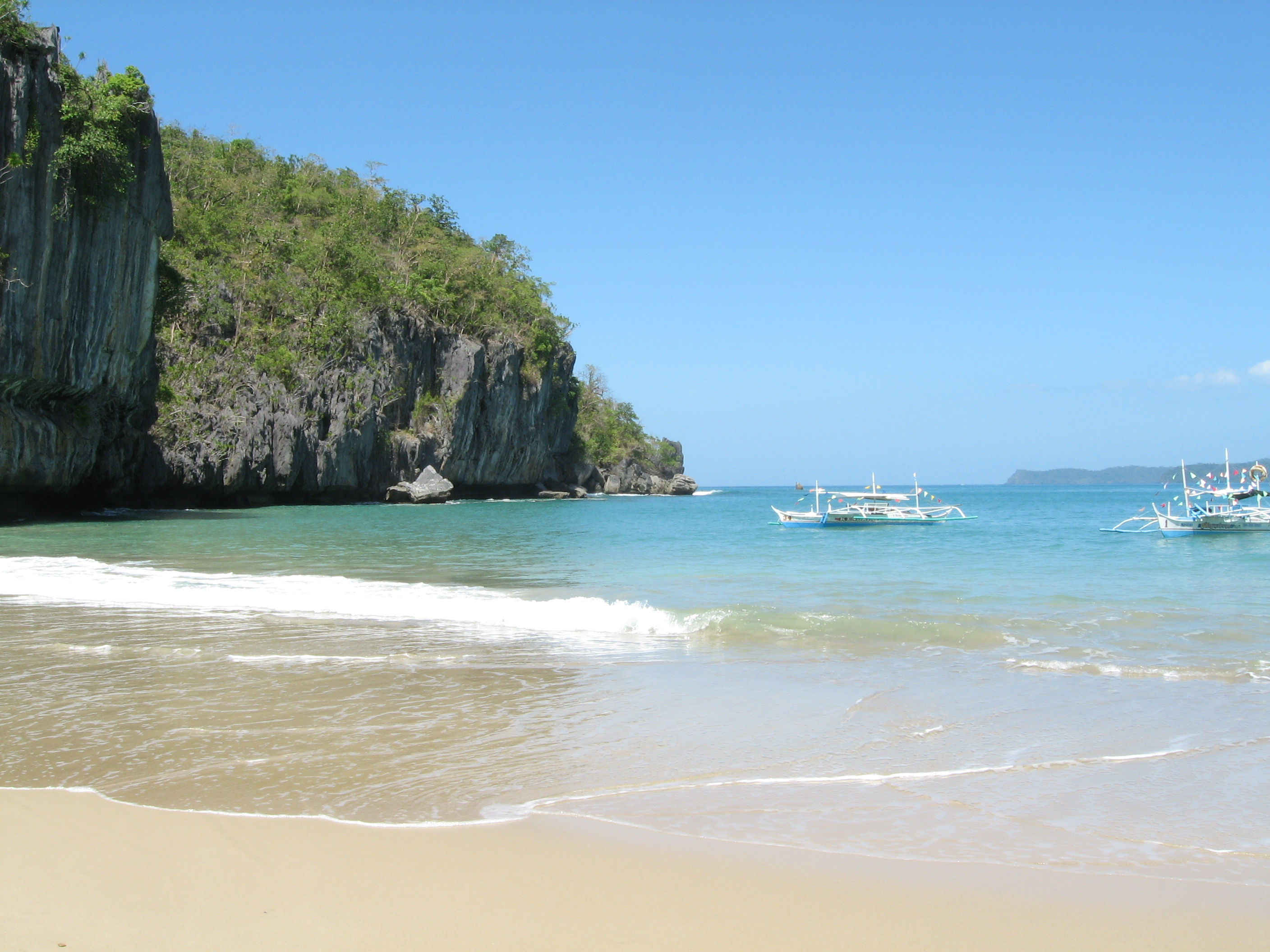
Sabang, Palawan

=== Marinduque ===
- Buenavista
  - Elephant (Bellarocca) Island
- Gasan
  - Baltazar Island
  - Gaspar Island
  - Melchor Island
- Santa Cruz
  - Maniwaya Island
- Torrijos
  - Poctoy Beach

=== Occidental Mindoro ===
- Looc
  - Ambil Island
  - Golo Island
- Lubang
  - Cabra Island
  - Lubang Island
  - Natalon Beach
- Mamburao
  - Tayamaan Beach
- Sablayan
  - Pandan Grande Island
- San Jose
  - Ambulog Island
  - Binantgaan Island
  - Cajos del Bajo Island
  - Ilin Island
  - White Island

=== Oriental Mindoro ===
- Baco
  - Alibatan Island
- Calapan
  - Suqui Beach
- Pinamalayan
  - Banilad Beach
  - Bongol Beach
- Puerto Galera
  - Aninuan Beach
  - Balatero Cove
  - Balete Beach
  - Big La Laguna Beach
  - Boquete Island
  - Coral Cove
  - Encenada Beach
  - Hondura Beach
  - Markoe Cove
  - Minolo Cove
  - Muelle Beach
  - Punta Guarda Beach
  - Sabang Beach
  - San Antonio Island
  - Small La Laguna Beach
  - Talipanan Beach
  - White Beach
- Roxas
  - Melco Beach

=== Palawan ===
- Busuanga

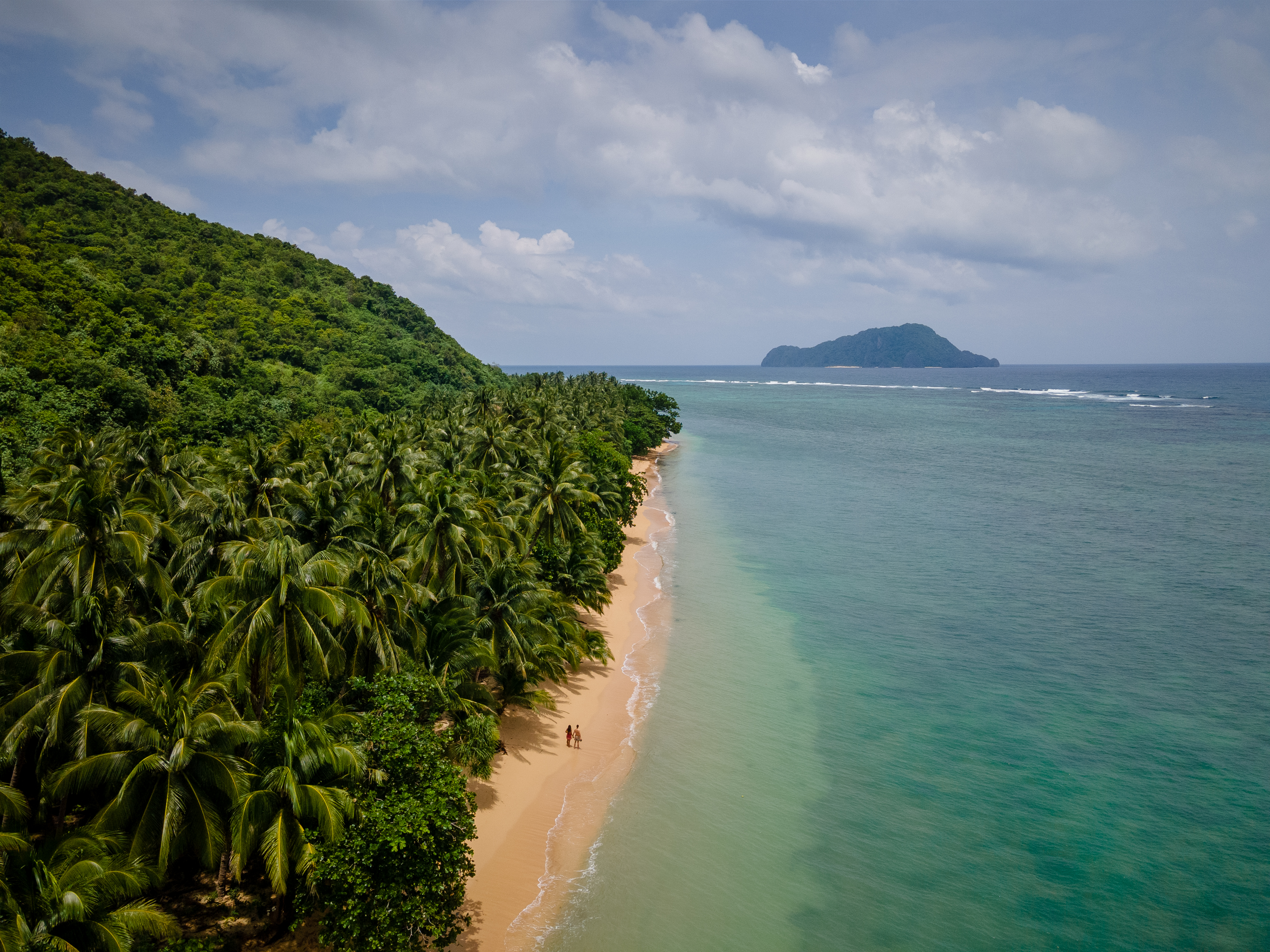
Cambaya Beach, Busuanga

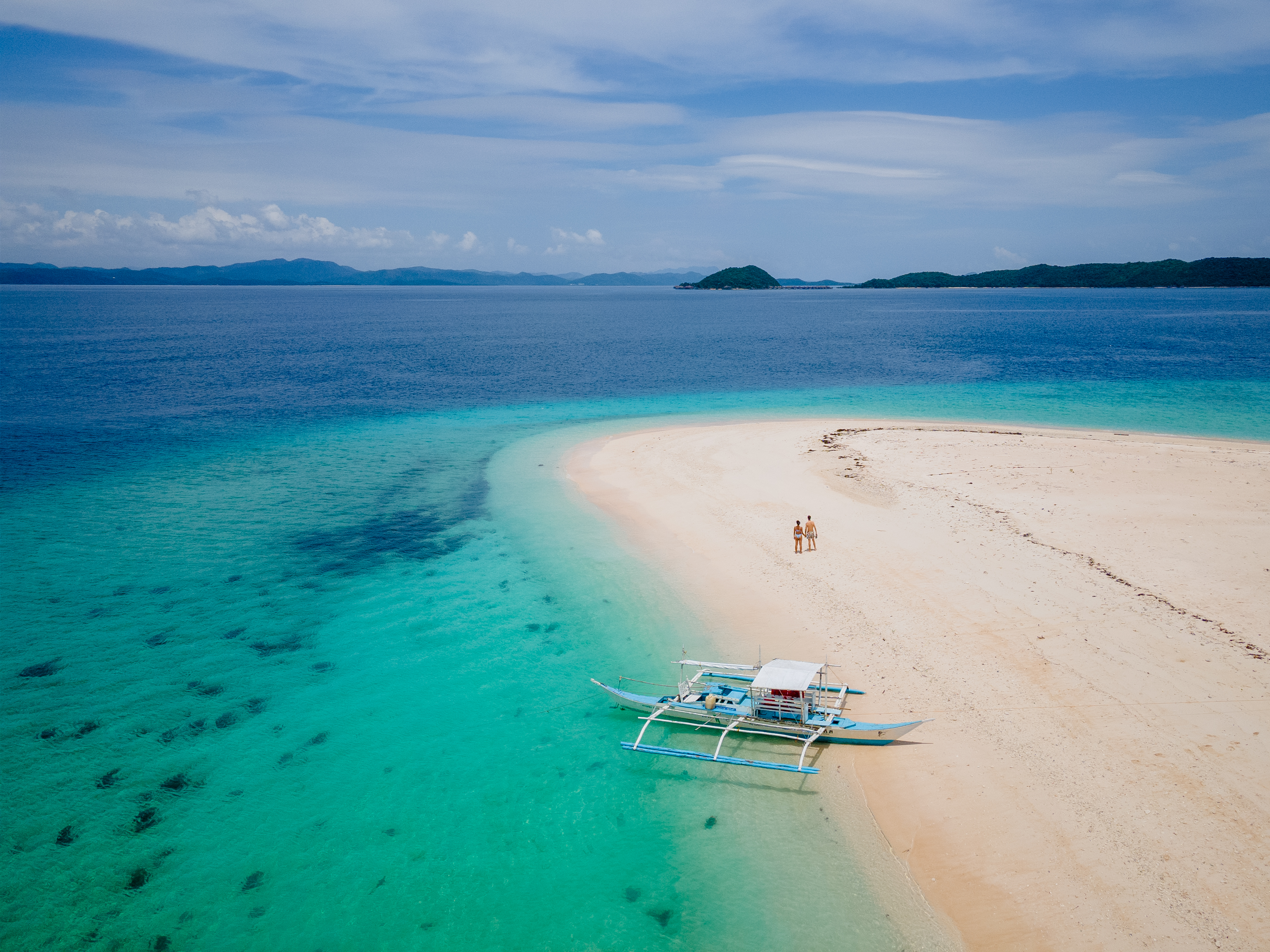
North Cay Island, Busuanga

  - Black Island
  - Cambaya Beach
  - Calumbuyan Island
  - Dibutonay Island
  - Dimakya Island
  - Dimipac Island
  - Dumunpalit Island
  - North Cay Island
  - South Cay Island
  - Teardrop Island
  - West Nalaut Island
- Cagayancillo
  - Bird Islet
  - North Atoll
  - South Atoll
- Coron

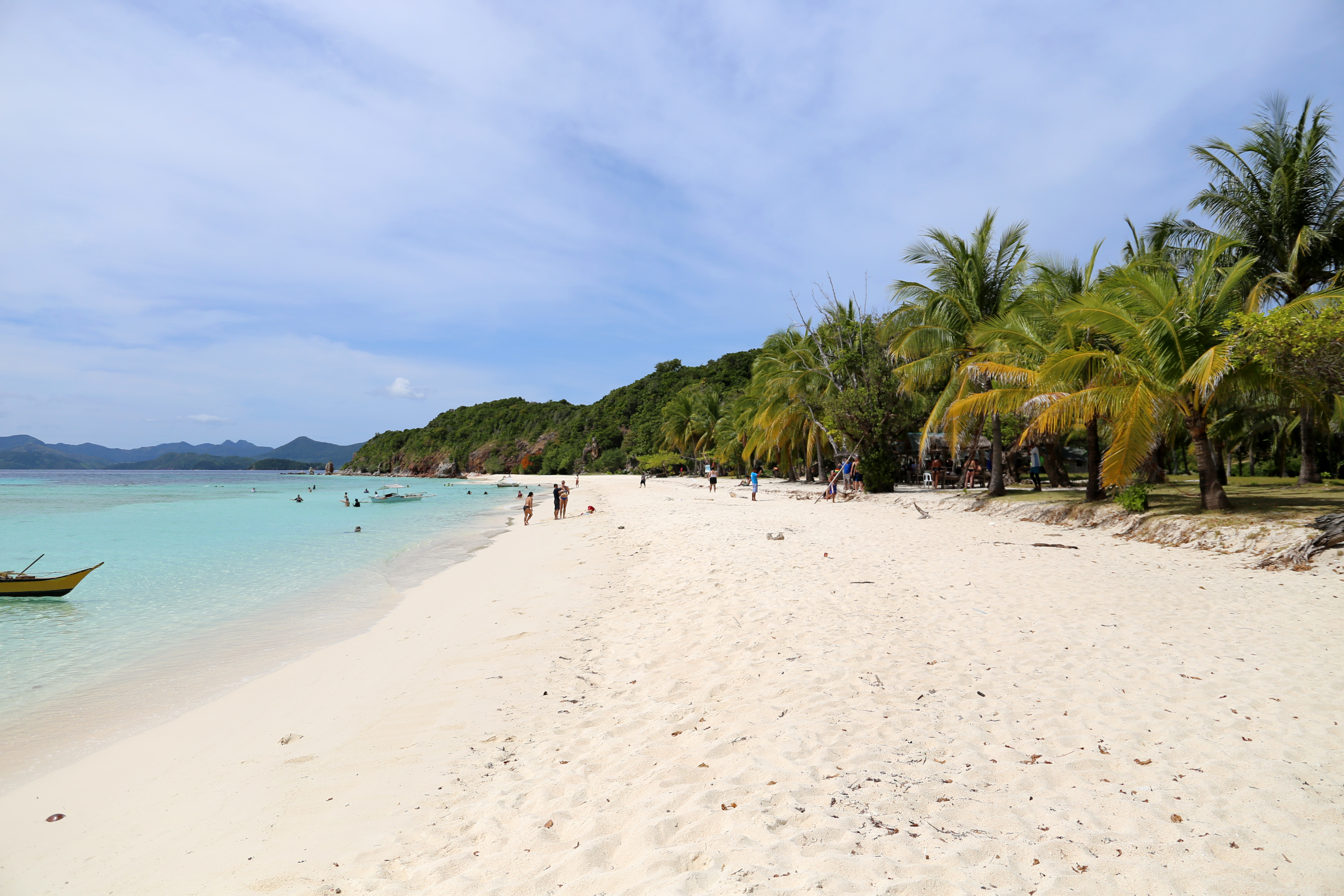
Malcapuya, Coron

  - Atwayan Beach
  - Banana Island
  - Banol Beach
  - Cagbatan (CYC) Island
  - Dibatoc Island
  - Diwaran Island
  - Malaroyroy Island
  - Malcapuya Island
  - San Jose Beach
  - Sangat Island
- Cuyo
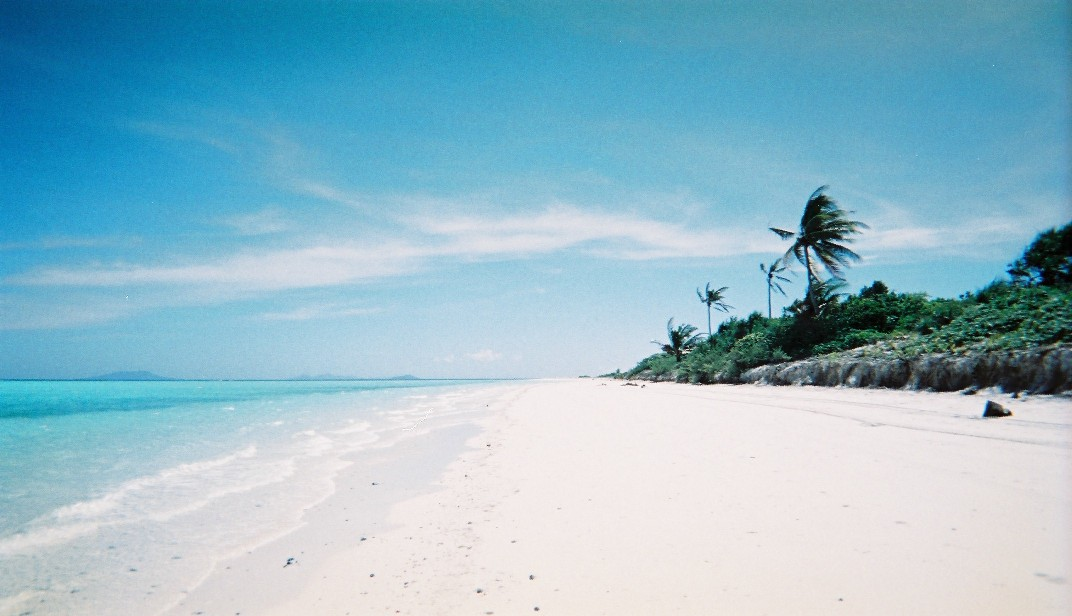
  - Amanpulo (Pamalican) Island, Cuyo
  - Amanpulo (Pamalican) Island
  - Capusan Beach
  - Manamoc Island
- Dumaran
  - Bacao Beach
  - Calampuan Island
  - Rinambacan Island
  - Pamalatan Island
  - San Juan Beach
- El Nido
  - Buena Suerte Beach
  - Cadlao Island
  - Calitang Beach
  - Commando Island
  - Dilumacad Island
  - Dolarog Beach

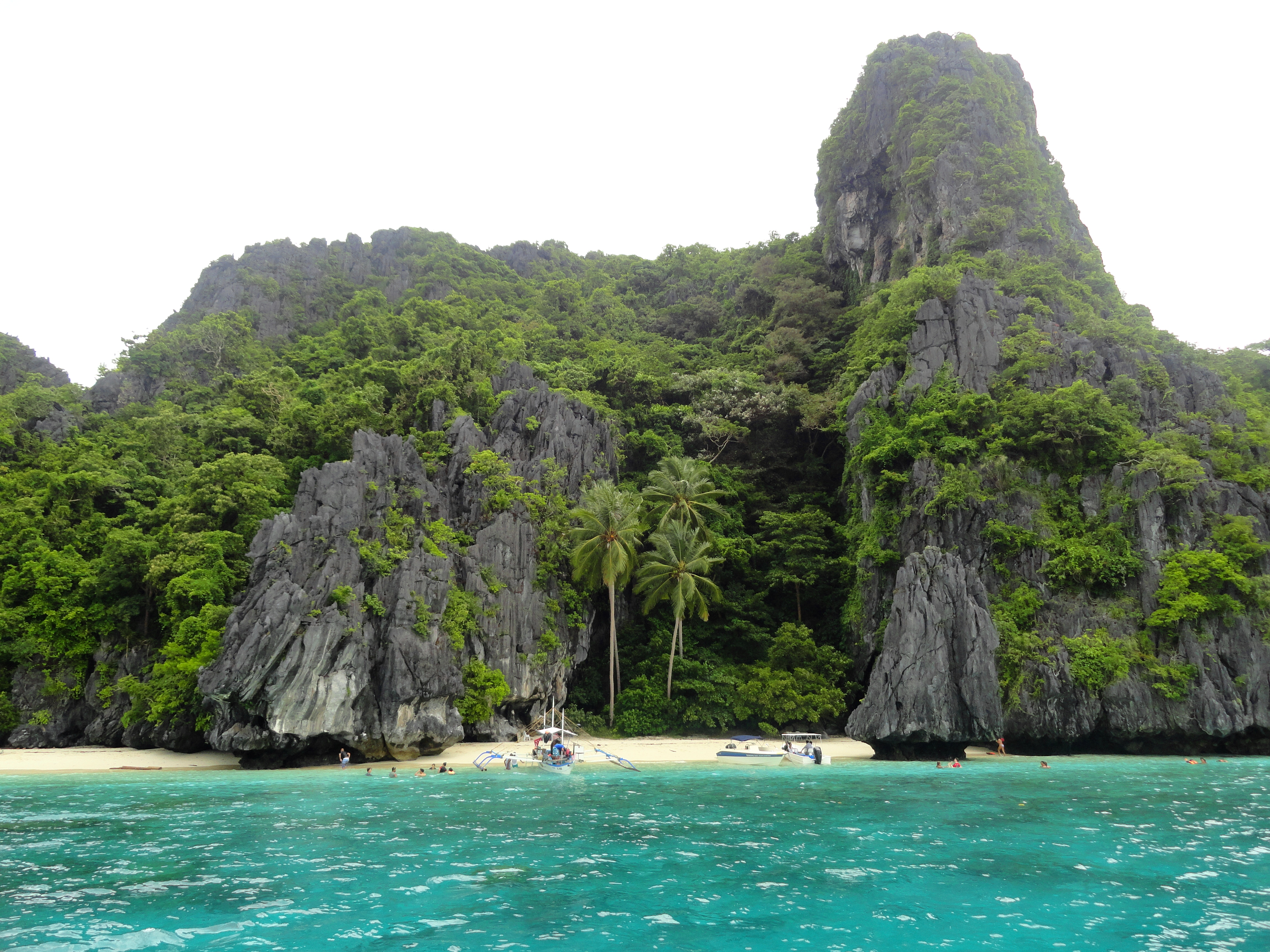
Entalula Island, El Nido

  - Entalula Island
  - Lagen Island
  - Malapacao Island
  - Matinloc Island
  - Marimegmeg Beach
  - Miniloc Island

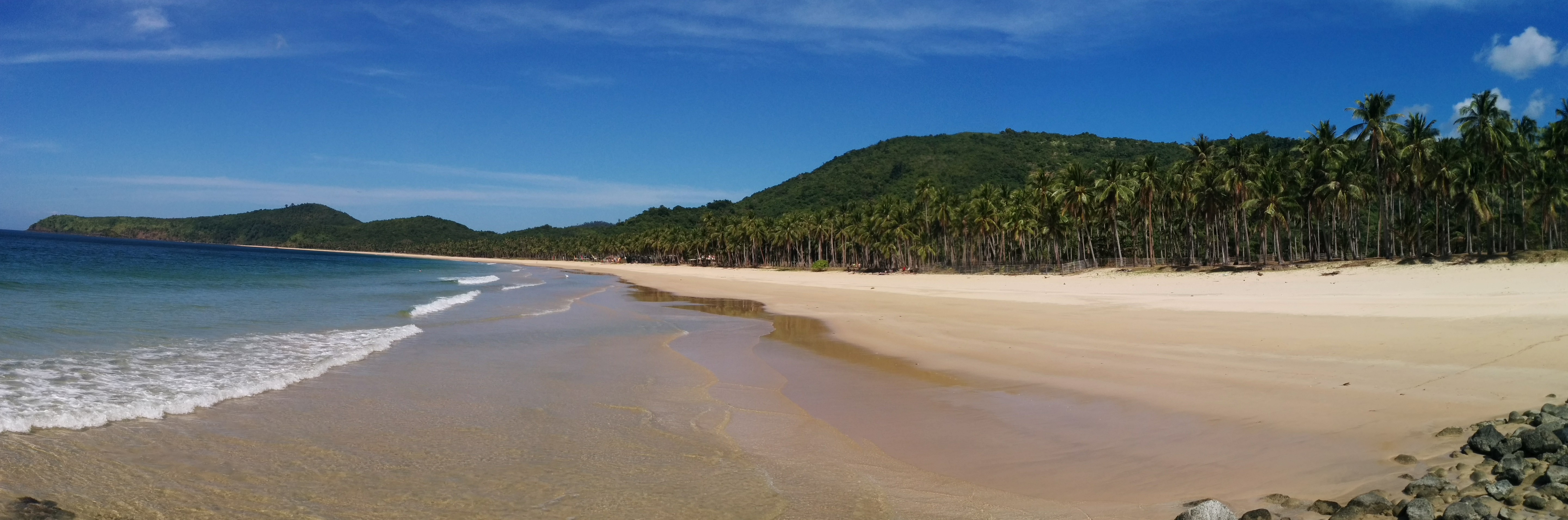
El Nido – Nacpan Beach

  - Nacpan Beach
  - Pangalusian Island
  - Pinagbuyatan Island
  - Pinasil Island
  - Shimizu Island
  - Vigan (Snake) Island
- Kalayaan
  - Pag-asa Island
- Linapacan
  - Cagdanao Island
- Magsaysay
  - Quijano Beach
- Puerto Princesa

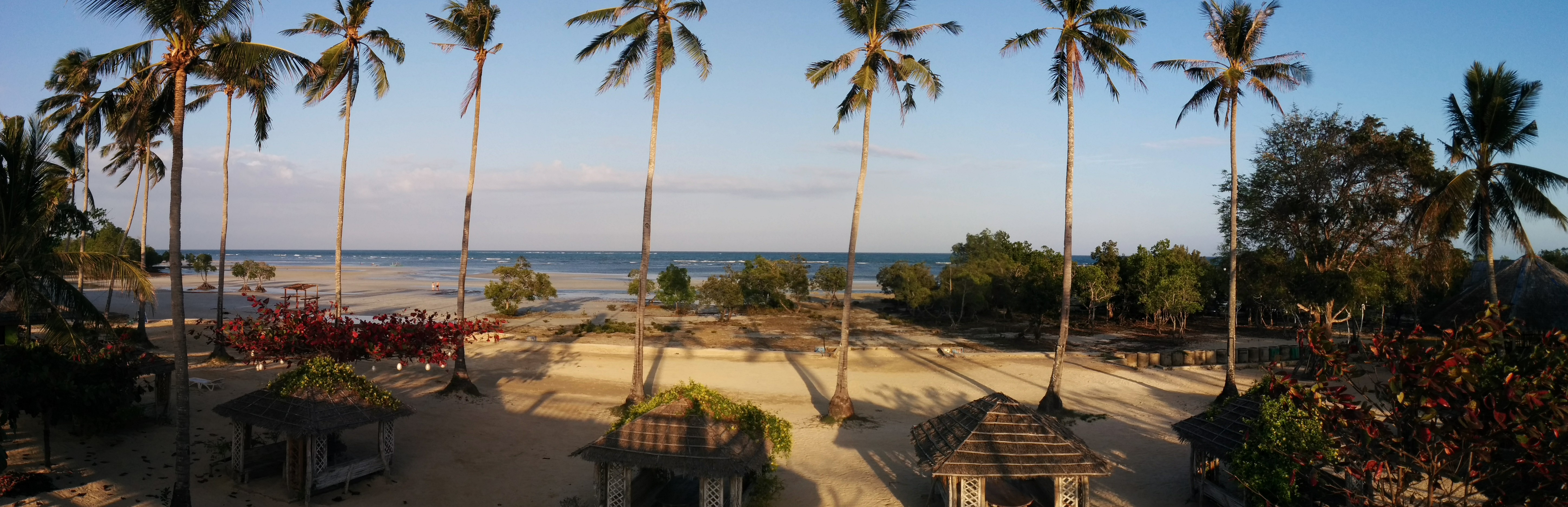
Puerto Princesa – The Emerald Beach and Nature Park

  - Arrecife (Dos Palmas) Island
  - Fondeado Island
  - Luli Island
  - Nagtabon Beach
  - Napsan Beach
  - Pandan Island
  - Sabang Beach
  - Señorita Island
  - Snake Island
- Roxas

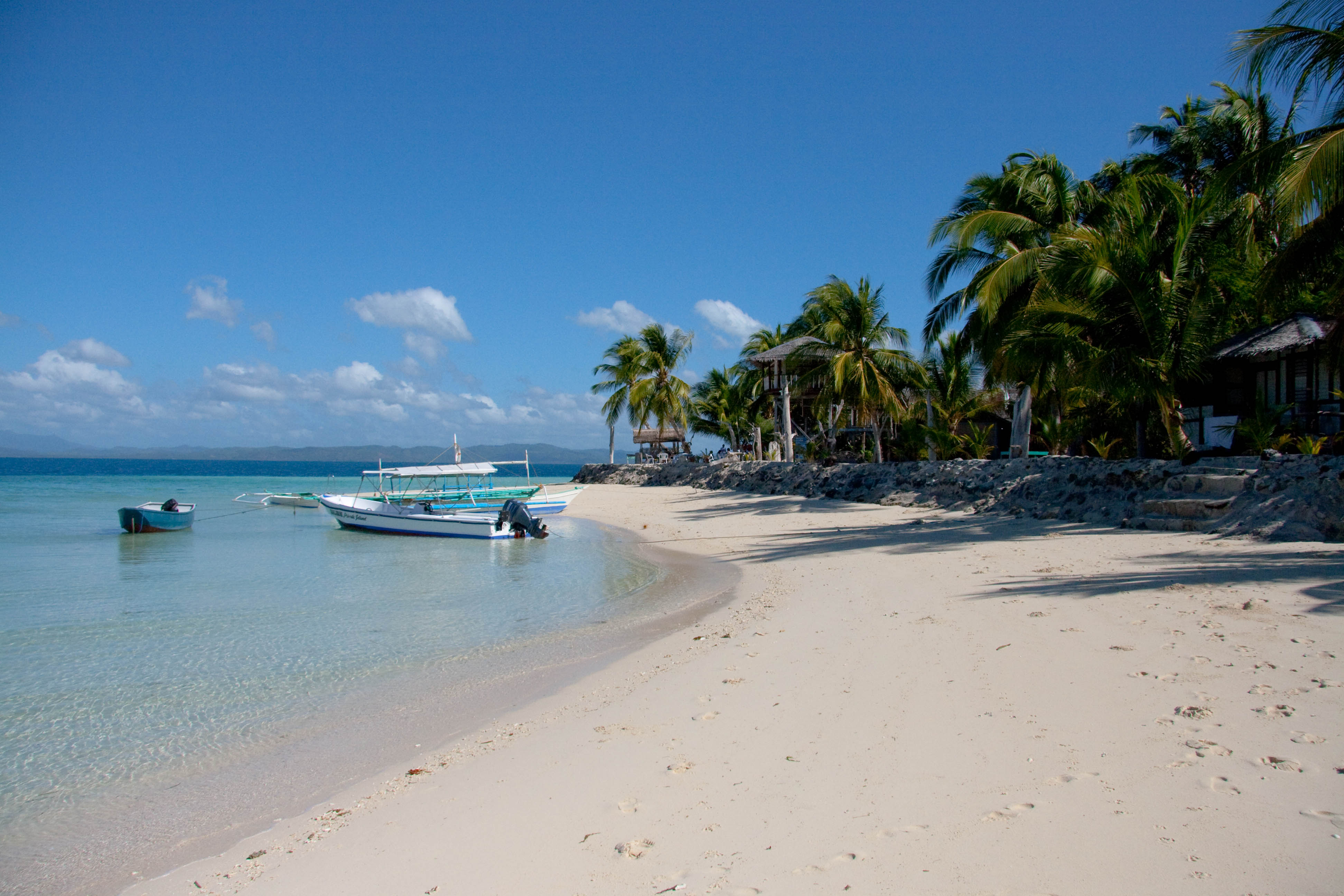
Coco Loco Island, Roxas

  - Coco Loco Island
- San Vicente

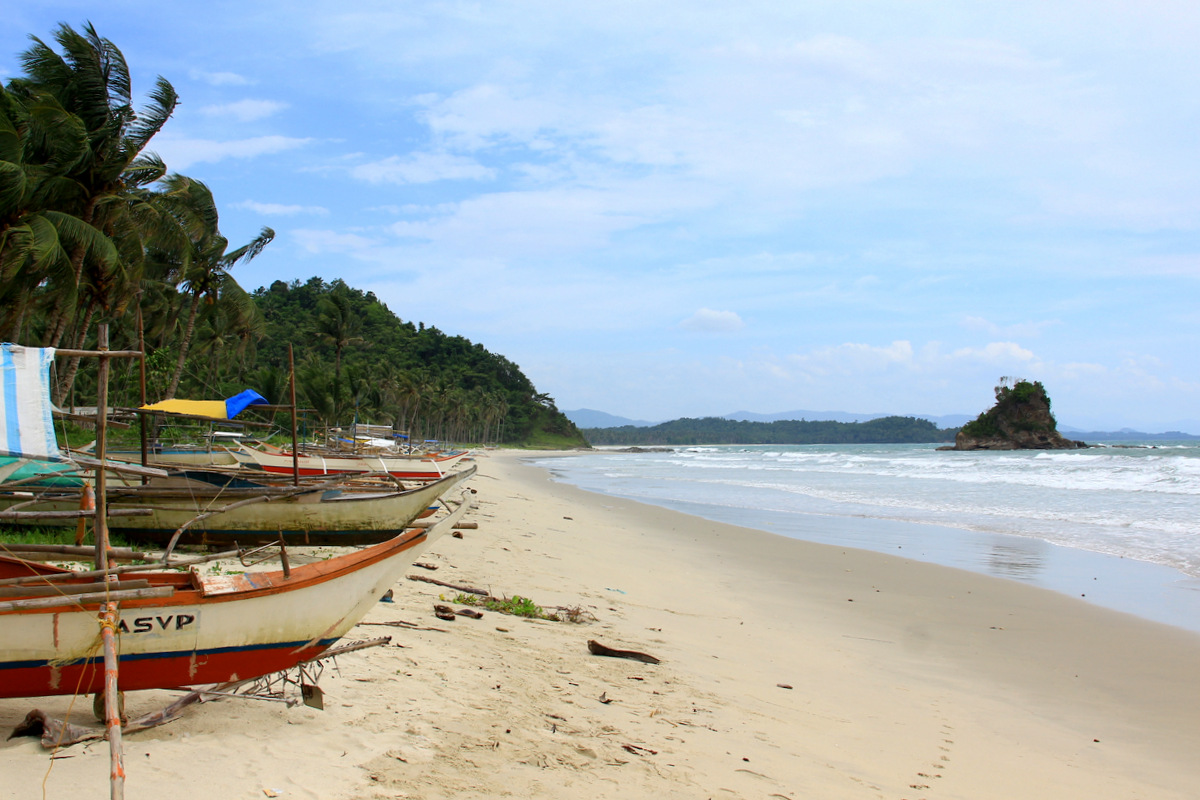
Alimanguan Beach, San Vicente

  - Alimanguan Beach
  - Boayan Island
  - Cacnipa Island
  - Long Beach
  - Port Barton
- Taytay
  - Apulit Island
  - Castle Island
  - Coral Island
  - Flower Island
  - Quimbaludan Island
  - Tagbulo Island

=== Romblon ===
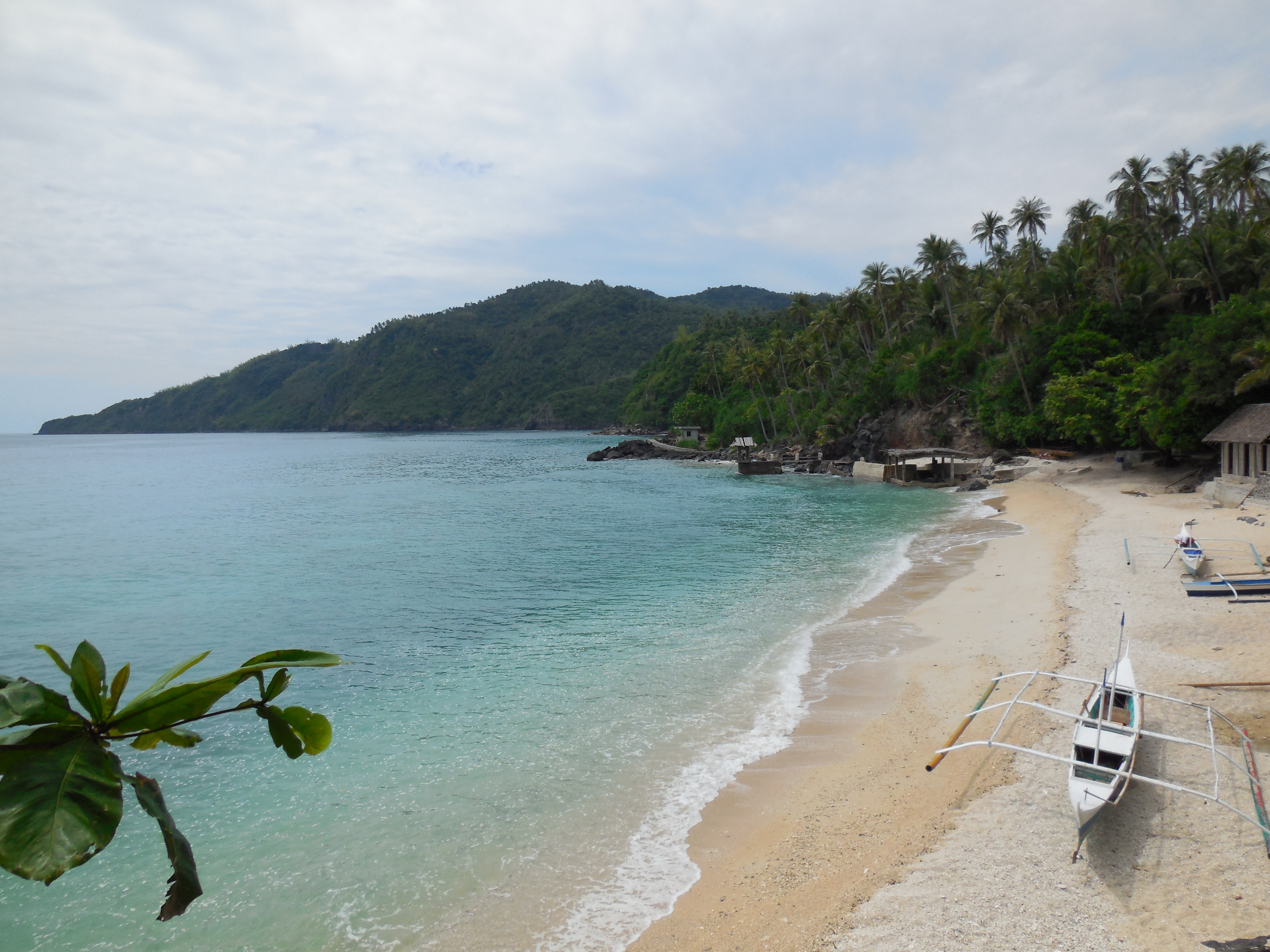
Macat-ang Beach, Banton

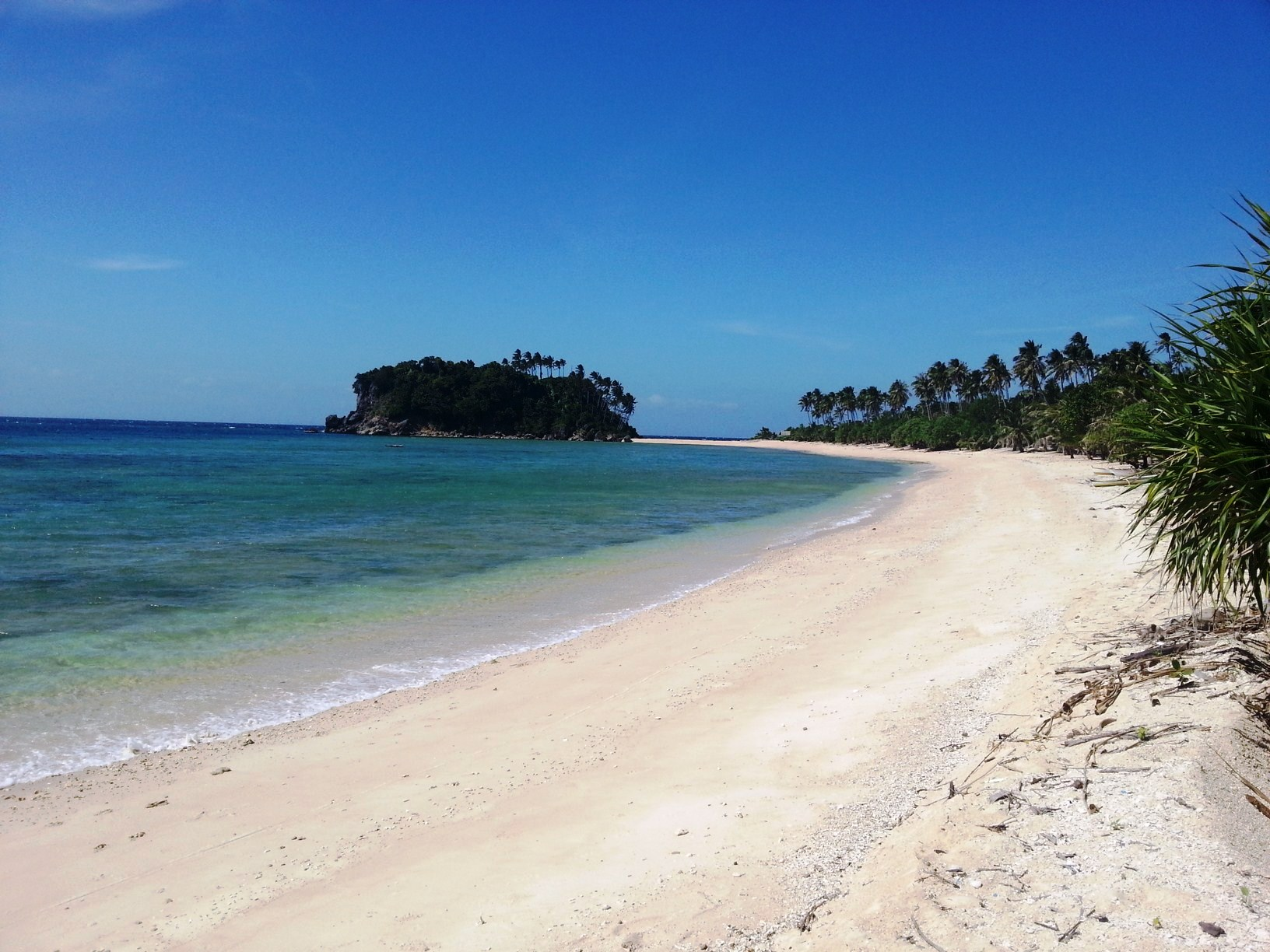
Binucot Beach, Ferrol

- Alcantara
  - Aglicay Beach
  - Calagonsao Beach
- Banton
  - Banton Island
  - Bantoncillo Island
  - Carlota Island
  - Isabel Island
  - Polloc Island
- Concepcion
  - Maestre de Campo Island
- Ferrol
  - Binucot Beach
- Romblon
  - Alad Islet
  - Bonbon Beach
  - Canyayo
  - Cobrador Island
  - Japar Islet
  - Taimban Beach
- San Fernando
  - Cresta de Gallo Island
- San Jose
  - Carabao Island
- Santa Fe
  - Cabahan Island
- Sta. Maria, Romblon (Little Boracay)

== Calabarzon ==
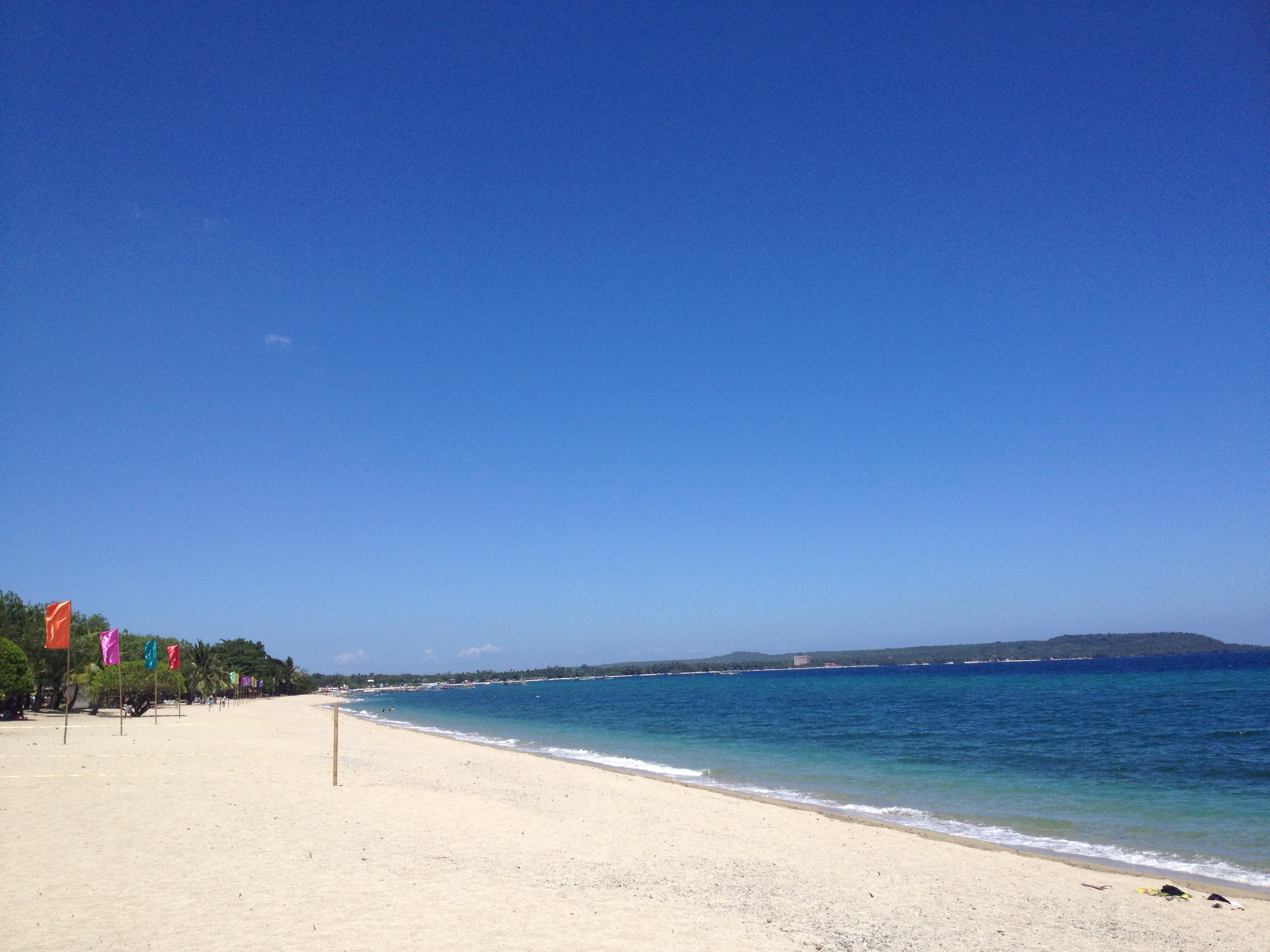
Laiya Beach in San Juan, Batangas

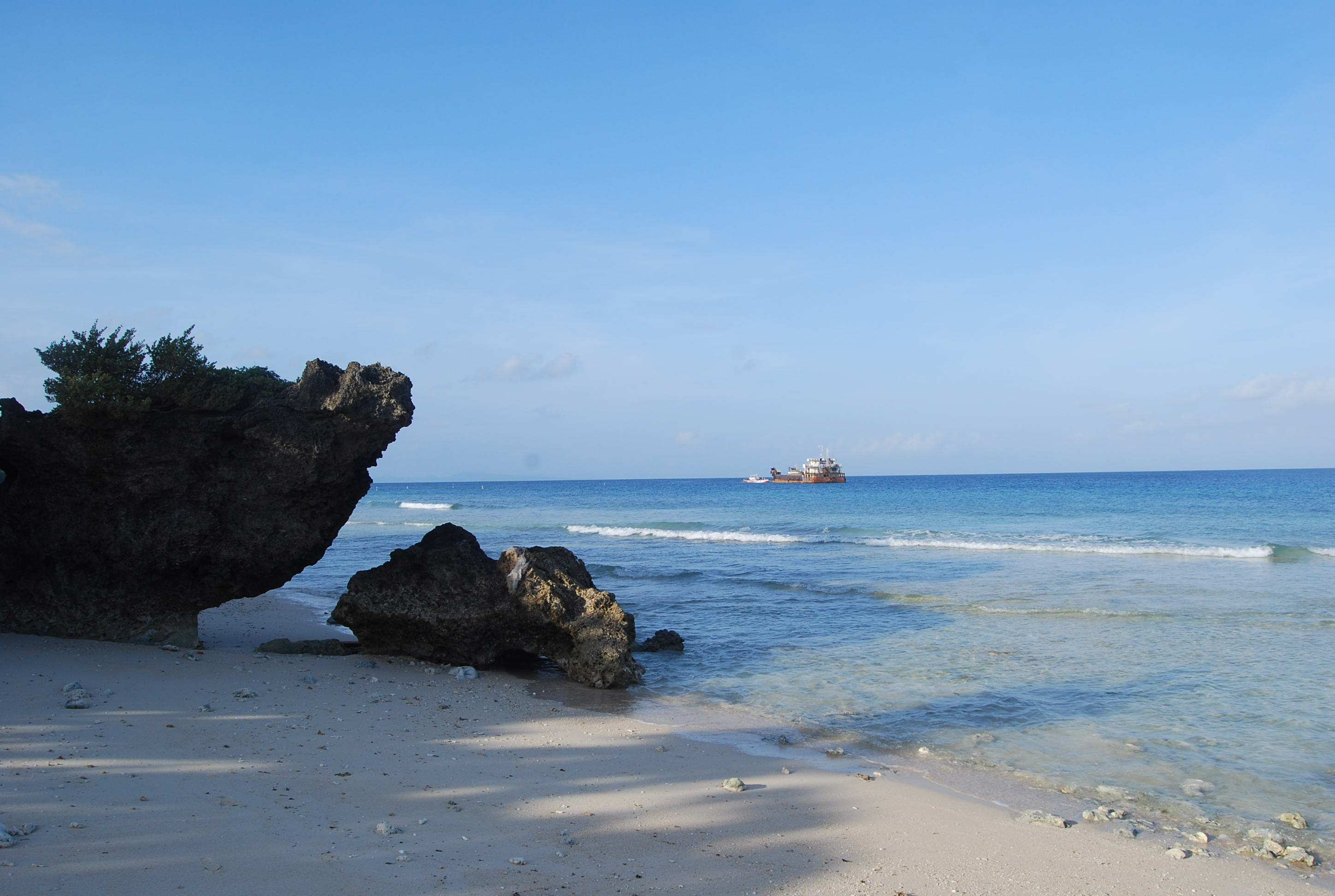
Balesin Island in Polillo, Quezon

=== Batangas ===
- Batangas
  - Verde Island
- Calatagan
  - Balibago Beach
  - Santa Ana Beach
  - Burot Beach
- Lian
  - Matabungkay Beach
- Lobo
  - Gerthel Beach
  - Malabrigo Beach
  - Olo-Olo Beach
  - Sawang Beach
  - Soloc Beach
  - Submarine Garden
- Mabini
  - Anilao Beach
  - Balangit Beach
  - San Teodoro Beach
  - Solo Beach
- Nasugbu
  - Calayo Beach
  - Fortune Island
  - Hamilo Coast
  - Munting Buhangin Beach
  - Natipunan Beach
  - Punta Fuego
  - Tali Beach
  - Twin Island
- San Juan
  - Hugon Beach
  - Laiya Beach
  - Mahabang Buhangin Beach
- Tingloy
  - Culebra Island
  - Masasa Beach
  - Maricaban Island
  - Sombrero Island

=== Cavite ===
- Maragondon
  - Carabao Island
  - Limbones Cove
  - Santa Mercedes Beach
- Ternate
  - Calumpang (Marine Base) Beach
  - Caylabne Cove
  - Paniman Bay
  - Puerto Azul

=== Quezon ===
- Buenavista
  - Cawa Beach
  - Cabong Beach
  - Mabutag Beach
- Burdeos
  - Anilon Island
  - Bakaw-Bakaw Island
  - Binombonan Island
  - Ikulong Island
  - Isla Puting Bato
- Catanauan
  - Catanauan Cove
  - Gatasan Beach
- Infanta
  - Santa Monica Beach
- Jomalig
  - Casuguran Beach
  - Manlanat Island
- Mauban
  - Alitap Beach
  - Cagbalete Island
- Mulanay
  - Long Beach
  - Malaking Bato Beach
- Padre Burgos
  - Basiao Beach
  - Borawan Beach
  - Dampalitan Island
  - Lipata Island
  - Talabaan Islands
  - Tulay Buhangin
- Pagbilao
  - Bantigue Beach
  - Grande Island
  - Patayan Island
  - Puting Buhangin/Cuebang Lampas Beach
- Patnanungan
  - Sila Beach
- Polillo
  - Balesin Island
  - Bird Island
  - Polillo Island
- Real
  - Baluti Island

== Western Visayas ==
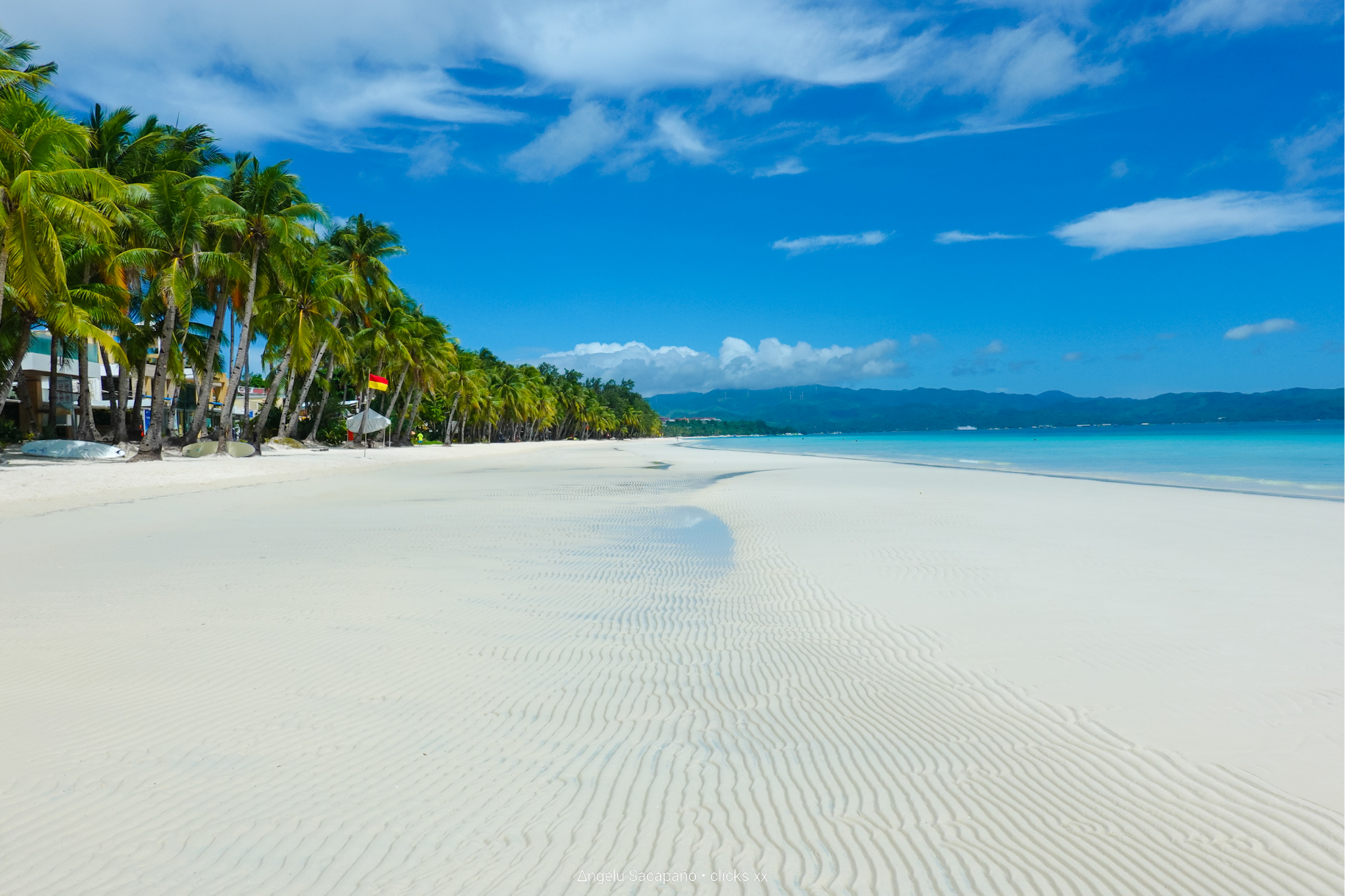
White Beach in Boracay Island, Malay, Aklan

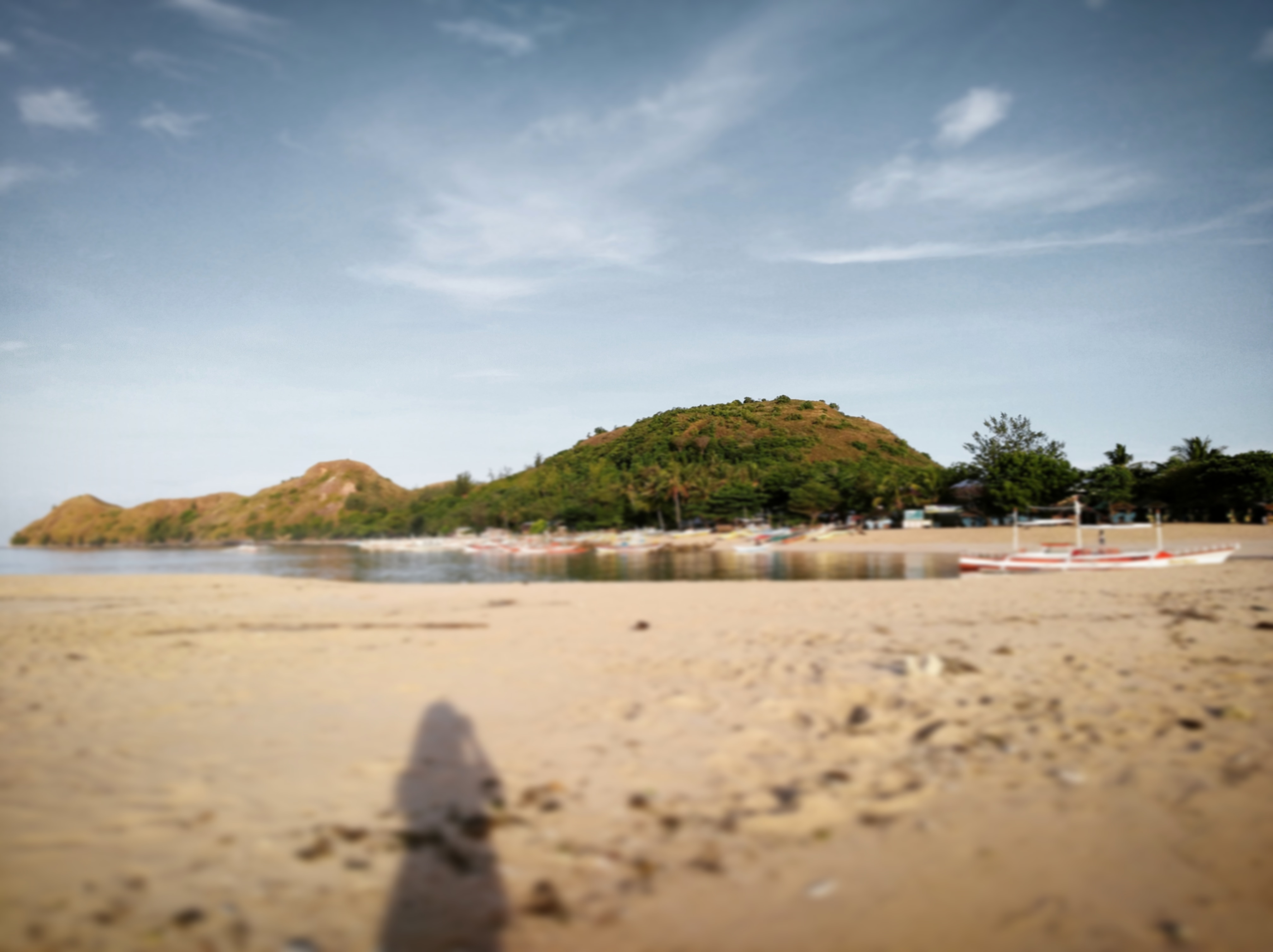
Mararison Island in Culasi, Antique

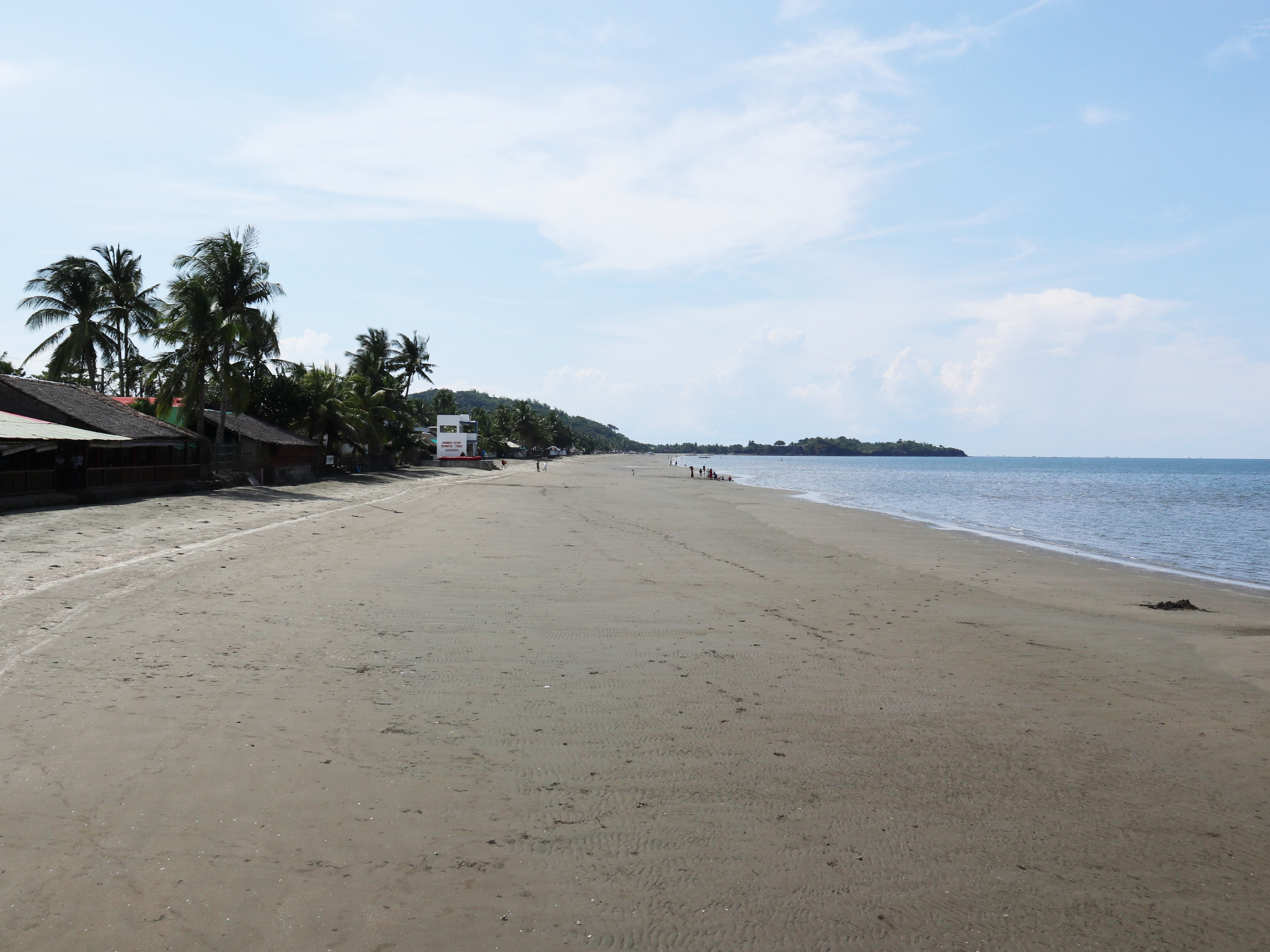
Baybay Beach in Roxas City, Capiz

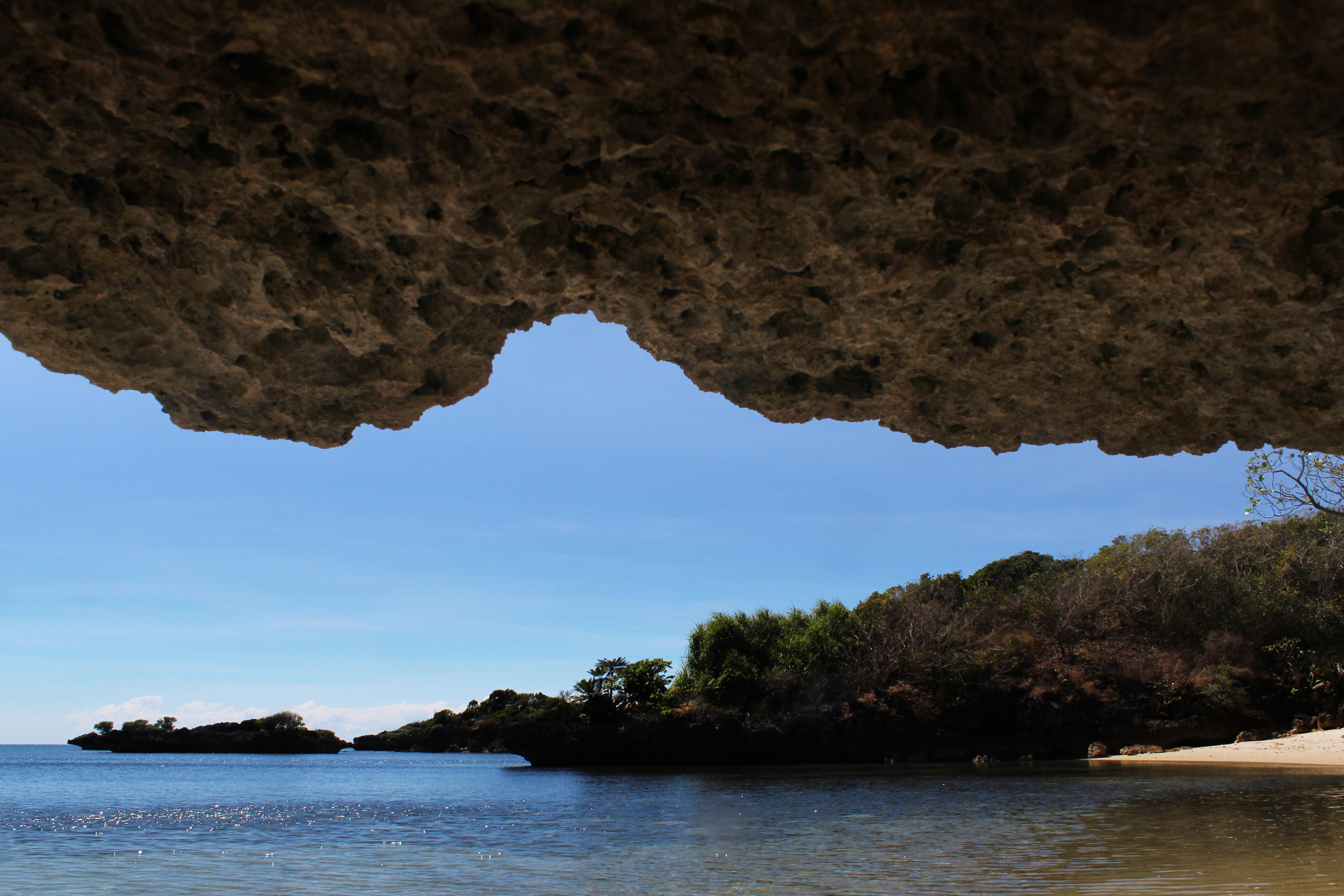
Taklong Island in Nueva Valencia, Guimaras

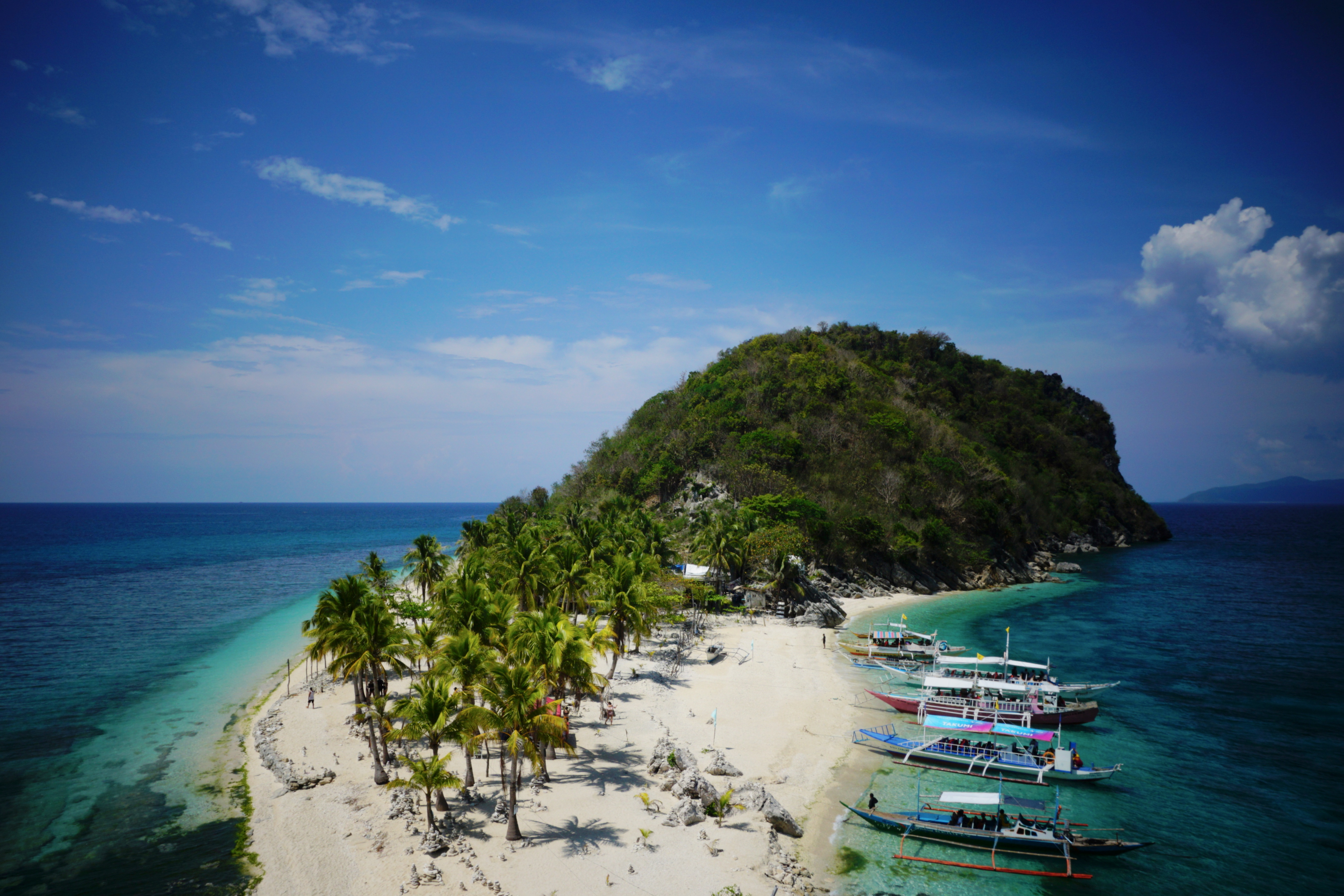
Cabugao Gamay Island in Carles, Iloilo

=== Aklan ===
- Batan
  - Tabon Island
- Buruanga
  - Palm Ville
  - Talisay Beach
  - Tuburan Beach
- Malay
  - Boracay Island
    - Balinghai Beach
    - Bulabog Beach
    - Cagban Beach
    - Diniwid Beach
    - Manoc-Manoc Beach
    - Puka Shell Beach
    - Tambisaan Beach
    - Tulubhan Beach
    - White Beach
    - Yapak Beach
  - Crocodile Island
  - Laurel Island

=== Antique ===
- Anini-y
  - Nogas Island
- Caluya
  - Sibato Island
  - Sibay Island
- Culasi
  - Batbatan Island
  - Mararison Island
- Libertad
  - Punta Pucio
- Pandan
  - Duyong Golden Beach
  - Mag-aba Beach
  - Patria Beach
  - Tingib Beach
- Tibiao
  - Seco Island

=== Capiz ===
- Pilar
  - Casanayan Beach
- Roxas
  - Baybay Beach
  - Olotayan Island
  - Ayagao Beach
- Ivisan
  - Balaring Beach
  - Basiao Beach

=== Guimaras ===
- Buenavista
  - East Valencia Beach
- Jordan
  - Ave Maria Islet
  - Baras Beach
  - Isla Naburot
  - Natago Beach
  - Tatlong Pulo Beach
- Nueva Valencia
  - Alubijod Beach
  - Guisi Beach
  - Taklong Island
  - Tando Beach
  - Tiniguiban Islet
- San Lorenzo
  - San Enrique Beach
- Sibunag
  - Inampulugan Island
  - Nagarao Island

=== Iloilo ===
- Ajuy
  - Marbuena Island
  - Nasidman Beach
- Barotac Viejo
  - Balaring Beach
- Carles
  - Antonia Beach
  - Bantigue Island
  - Binuluangan Island
  - Cabugao Islet
  - Calagnaan Island
  - Gigantillo Island
  - Isla de Gigantes Norte
  - Isla de Gigantes Sur
  - Sicogon Island
- Concepcion
  - Agho Island
  - Bolobadiangan Island
  - Igbon Island
  - Pan de Azucar Island
  - Pulo Piña Island
  - Tago Island
  - Tambaliza Beach
- Iloilo
  - Villa Beach
- Oton
  - Anhawan Beach
  - Villa Rica Beach
- San Joaquin
  - Basang Basa Beach
  - Bogtong Bato Beach
  - Tobog Beach
- Tigbauan
  - Namocon Beach
  - Parara Beach

== Zamboanga Peninsula ==
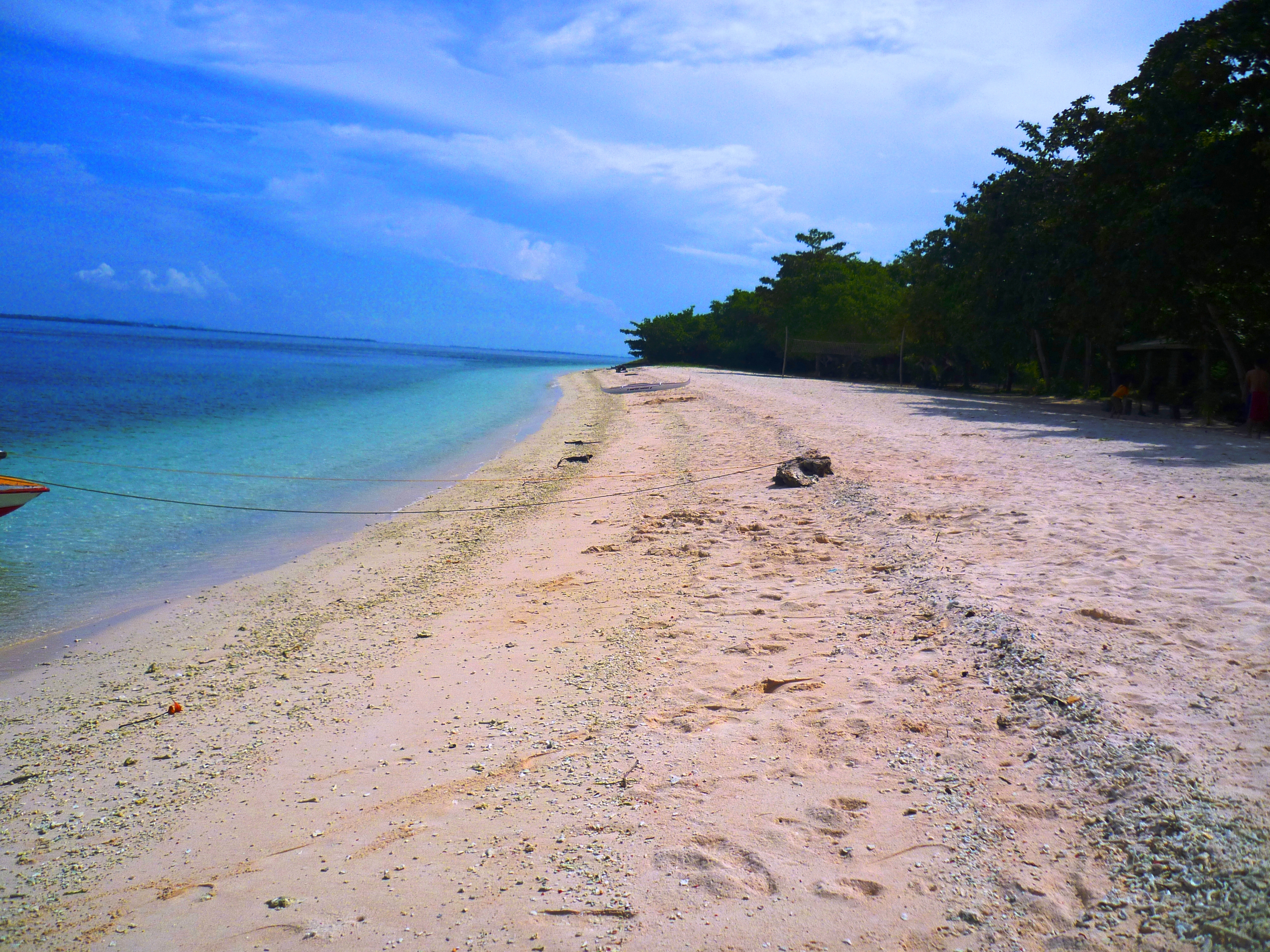
Great Santa Cruz Island in Zamboanga, Zamboanga del Sur

=== Zamboanga del Norte ===
- Dapitan
  - Aliguay Island
  - Dakak Beach
  - Selinog Island
  - Taguilon Cove
- Dipolog
  - Sicayab Beach
- Sibutad
  - Piñahun Island

=== Zamboanga del Sur ===
- Pagadian
  - Bomba Beach
  - Dao-Dao Islands
  - Muricay Beach
  - Poloyagan Beach
- Pitogo
  - Panikian Island
- Tukuran
  - Baguio Beach
- Zamboanga City
  - Isla Baong
  - Isla Bobo
  - Isla Buguias
  - Isla Gran Santa Cruz
  - Isla Lambang
  - Isla Malanipa
  - Isla Pequeña Santa Cruz
  - Isla Pitas
  - Isla Sacol
  - Isla Salangan
  - Isla Visa
  - Isla Vitali
  - Playa Arcillas
  - Playa Bolong
  - Playa Caragasan
  - Playa Cawa-Cawa
  - Playa Labuan
  - Playa San Ramon

== Unsorted ==
- Great Santa Cruz Island, Zamboanga City
- Bantayan Island, Cebu
- El Nido, Palawan
- Coron, Palawan
- Caramoan Peninsula, Camarines Sur
- Balesin Island, Quezon
- Samal Island, Davao
- Nasugbu, Batangas
- Puerto Galera, Mindoro
- Honda Bay, Palawan
- San Vicente, Palawan
- Malapascua Island, Cebu
- Amanpulo, Pamalican, Palawan
- Baseco Beach, Manila
- Misibis Bay, Cagraray Island, Albay
- Boracay, Aklan
- Panglao Island, Bohol
- Camaya Coast, Bataan
- Mactan Island, Cebu
- Bagolatao, Minalabac, Camarines Sur

== See also ==
- List of beaches
