= Leyte–Samar Naval Base =

Major World War II base

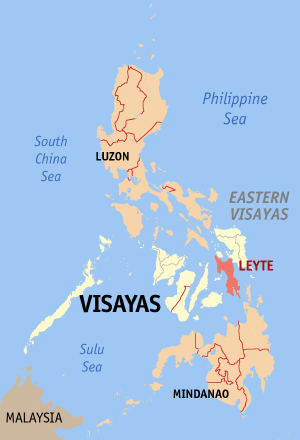
- Location within the Philippines

Geography
- Location: Leyte, Eastern Visayas, Philippines, in South East Asia
- Coordinates: 11.250939°N 124.992726°E
- Archipelago: Visayas
- Adjacent to: Leyte Gulf; San Pedro Bay; San Juanico Strait

Administration
- United States Navy

Demographics
- Population: 67,000 Troops at its peak June 1944 (in use 1944-1945); Abandoned 1947

Additional information
- Time zone: PST (UTC+8)

Leyte–Samar Naval Base was a large United States Navy base in the Philippines on the Islands of Leyte, Samar and the San Pedro Bay. The base was built during World War II to support the many naval ships fighting and patrolling in the South West Pacific theatre of war as part of the Pacific War. A number of naval facilities were built on the east coast of Leyte island starting October 20, 1944. The first base was built at between the city of Tacloban and Anibong Point, a mile north of the city. Headquarters for the Seventh Fleet was built at Tolosa, 10 miles south of Tacloban on Leyte. The bases were on the large San Pedro Bay in Leyte Gulf which provided safe anchorage for many ships. Due to the lack of dry ground in Tacloban a second base was built on the east side of Leyte Gulf, on the south tip of Samar, on Calicoan Island and Tubabao Island. At Samar, a large Naval Depot was built to support the Pacific War. Samar was about 50 miles across Leyte Gulf from Tacloban. All construction was done by the Navy's Seabees.

== Leyte–Samar Bases ==
Leyte–Samar Naval Base was not one single base, but a number of facilities on the west, north, east shores of San Pedro Bay, and in the bay.

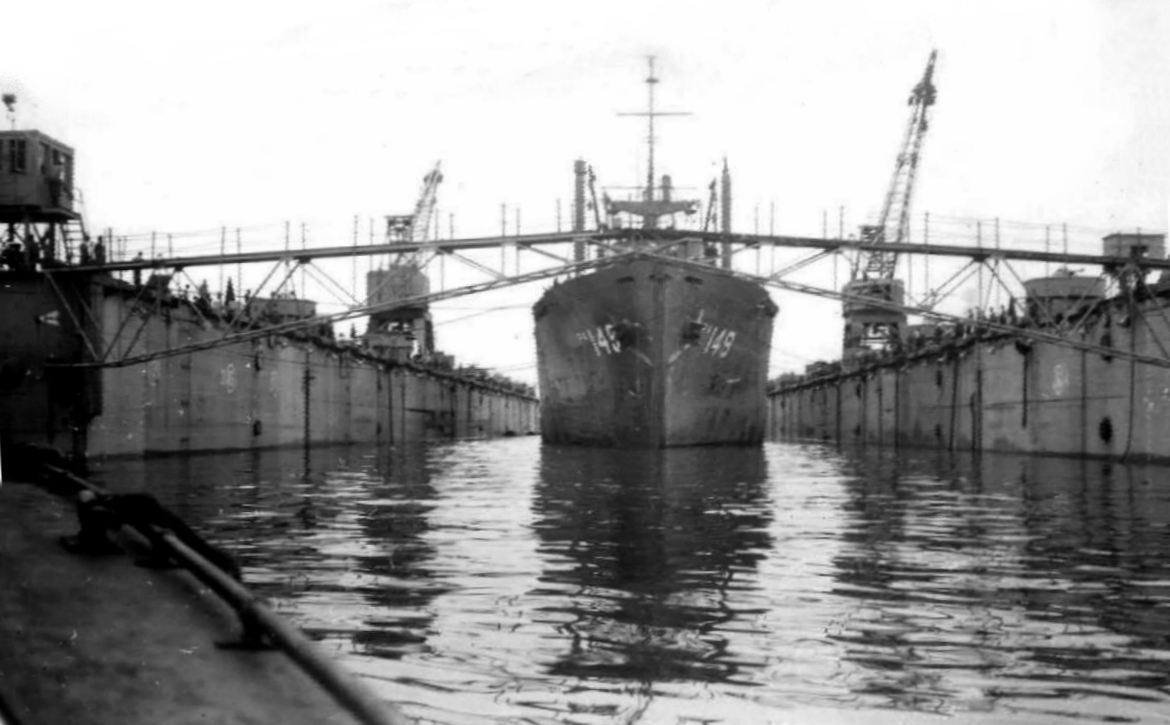
The USS ABSD-5 in Guiuan waters during World War II

Tacloban Naval Base in 1944

- Tacloban Naval station, on Casiguran Bay, was the Leyte–Samar headquarters, Fleet communication center, the fleet post office, Quonset hut barracks, a base dispensary with beds. After the first landing, existing buildings and warehouses were used for the headquarters and barracks. Fleet Post office FPO# 3964 SF Tacloban. The Tacloban base and Port of Tacloban were at 11.250939°N 124.992726°E.
- Tolosa base at Tolosa had a communication center for the Seventh Fleet and the Philippine Sea Frontier headquarters. Seabees built quonset hut barracks. The 6th, and 13th Air Force were also stationed at Tolosa. Fleet Post Office FPO# 3201 SF Leyte Island. The Tolosa base was at 11.059054°N 125.038426°E.
- San Jose Airstrip later renamed Tacloban Airfield, was built by the Seabees at 11°13′39″N 125°01′40″E.
- Jinamoc Seaplane Base was built on Jinamoc Island in 1944, five miles east of the Tacloban base. At first, a temporary seaplane ramp was built and later a steel and concrete ramp was built. Quonset hut barracks and dispensary were at the base. The Jinamoc Seaplane Base was near Basey. The base closed in 1945. The Jinamoc Seaplane Base was at located 11°16′10.2″N 125°04′25.0″E.
- Calicoan Naval Base was Calicoan Island. Calicoan Island is flat and is about a mile wide and 7 miles long. Stationed were 3,600 Troops. Calicoan Naval Base was a large storage depot and general quartermaster station, an Advanced Base Construction Depot. For loading and unloading a 500-foot wood pier and a 500-foot pontoon pier were built. The port could handle seven cargo ships. For loading and unloading, landing ships LCTp a jetty was built that could hand;e five ships. Fleet Post Office FPO# 3149 SF Samar Island. Located at 10.947887°N 125.820162°E.

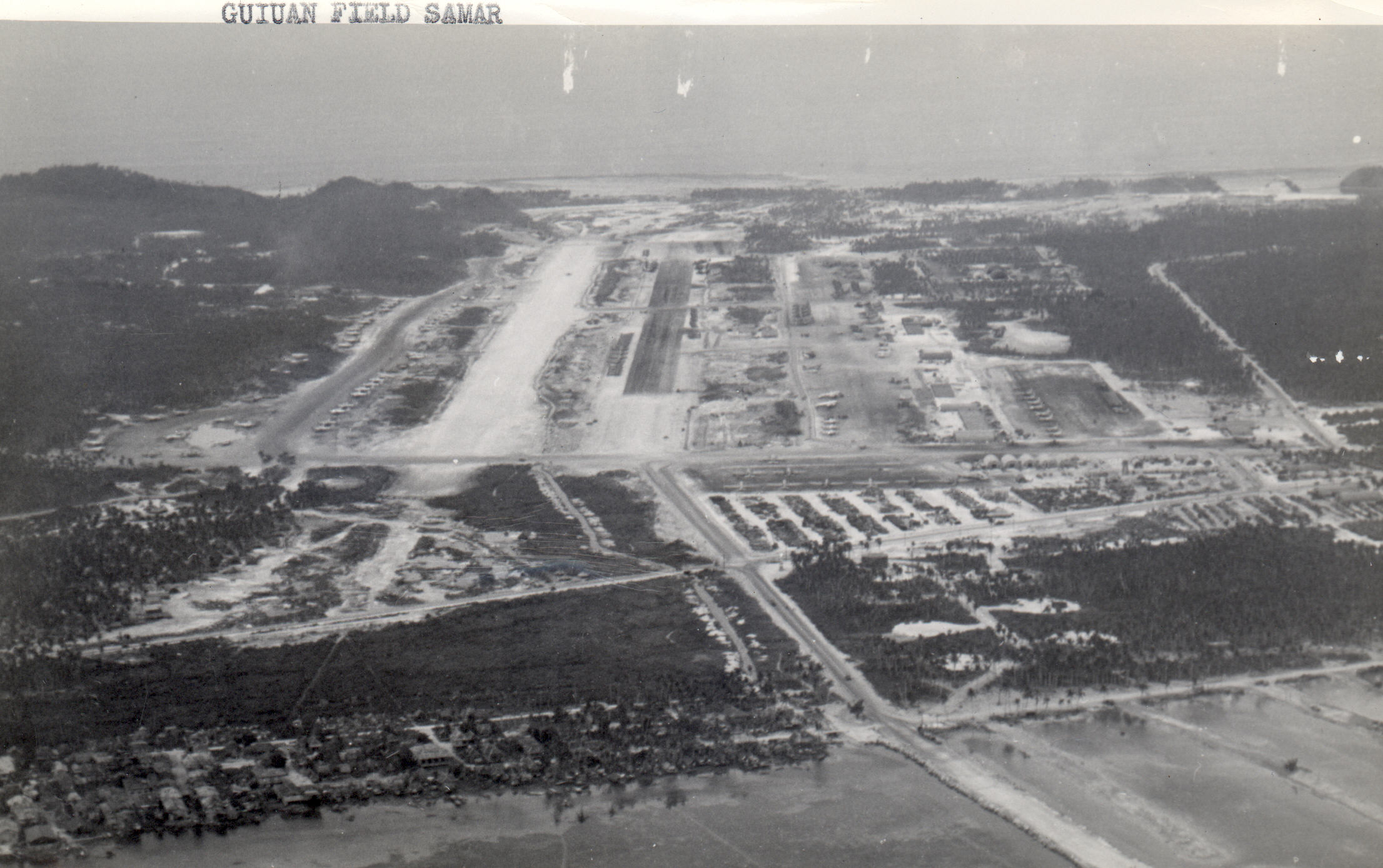
Aerial view of Guiuan Airfield on Guiuan Island

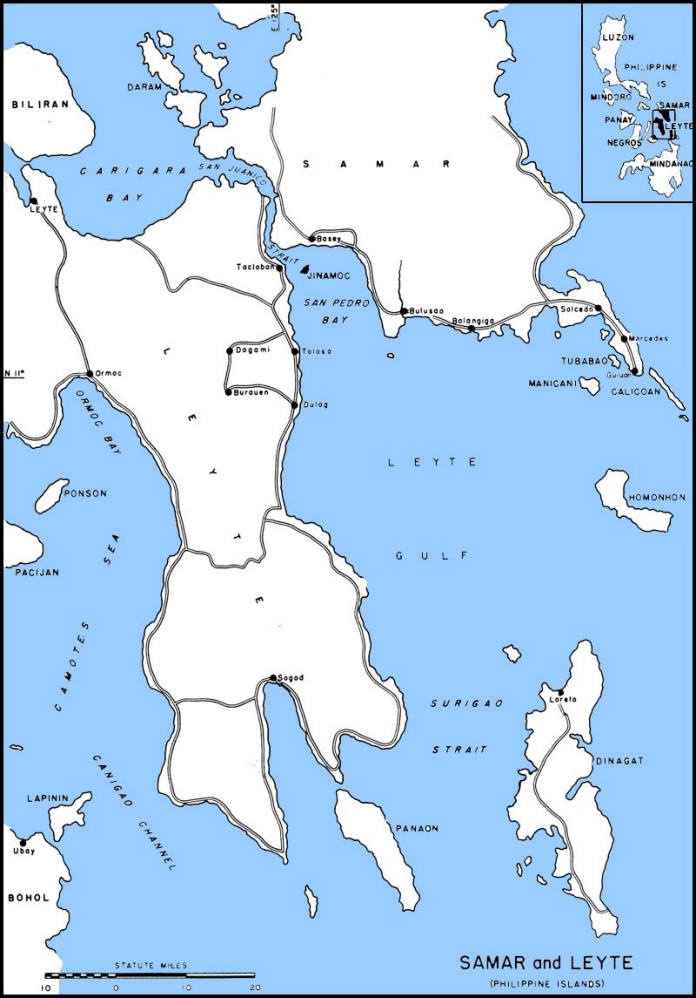
Map of major Leyte–Samar Naval Bases in 1944

- Guiuan Naval Base on Guiuan, Samar was built by the 93rd and 61st Seabees stated on December 1, 1944. Guiuan became a major base with a vast warehouse depot. Guiuan was the Seabees headquarters with an 80-acre construction depot. Many residents of Guiuan were hired to work on the large base.
- Guiuan Airport was a United States Navy air base built by Seabees of the 61st and 93rd Naval Construction Battalions. Seabees built the runway, the Guiuan strip, that opened December 18, 1944 at 11°02′07″N 125°44′29″E, now the Guiuan Airport. Later a second runway was built.
- Tubabao Base on Tubabao Island was used for unloading of supplies of ships. To get the supplies to Guiuan a wooden bridge was built. The bridge was 515 feet long and 22 feet wide. Tubabao Base was at 11.0448°N 125.7116°E
- Salcedo PT Boat Base, a large PT boat base, with repair depot and three pontoon drydock, was built at Salcedo, Eastern Samar at 11.141789°N 125.659529°E. Salcedo Base housed 3,000 troops.
- Guiuan Naval hospital, the Seabees built a 3,000-bed hospital 5 miles north of the Guiuan Base to serve the base and ships. The 20,000-square-foot hospital had 311 buildings and 14 quonsets. Built at 11.072196°N 125.691443°E.
- Ammunition depot was built north of the Guiuan Naval hospital, placing it away from all bases. A 20 miles road was built to connect the Ammunition depot to Guiuan.
- Manicani Base was on Manicani Island off Samar at the city of San Antonio. At Manicani base a ship repair base was built. Housing for 10,000 troops was built with headquarters, mess hall, 100-foot pier, 1,500-by-80-foot pier, a pontoon pier and support buildings. Off Manicani Island the USS Artisan (AFDB-1) and USS ABSD-5 worked. Fleet Post Office FPO# 3864 SF Manacani Island. When it closed in 1945 all buildings were removed from the island. Located at 10°59′31″N 125°38′13″E
- Fleet Recreation Centers were built at San Antonio, near the ship repair base and Osmeña, Marabut, Samar at 11.193004°N 11.193004°E.
- Bolusao water treatment plant for ship replenishment was built near Bolusao, Lawaan, Samar on the Sungduan-Bolusao River at 11.129428°N 125.261130°E
- Bolusao Tank farm was built near Bolusao at the North end San Pedro Bay, near the water treatment plant. Bolusao Tank farm stored fuel for the ships and base.
- Balangiga sawmill was built at the city of Balangiga at 11.129428°N 125.384276°E.
- Hinundayan a town that was freed on October 22, 1944. Hinundayan Gulf, south of Leyte, was used for US Navy anchor and a small base was built, Naval Base Hinundayan. Fleet Post Office FPO# 3958 SF Hinundayan, Leyte.
- Port of Ormoc, west of Leyte, was freed on December 11, 1944 in the Battle of Ormoc Bay. The port had unlimited anchorage. A small Naval Base was built at the port, Naval Base Ormoc. Fleet Post Office FPO# was 3102 SF Ormoc, Leyte.
- Port of Calbayog, north of Leyte, was freed in 1945 by Philippine Commonwealth troops and the guerrillas. The port had unlimited anchorage. A small Naval Base was built at the port, Naval Base Calbayog. Fleet Post Office FPO# 3957 SF Calbayog, Samar.

== History ==
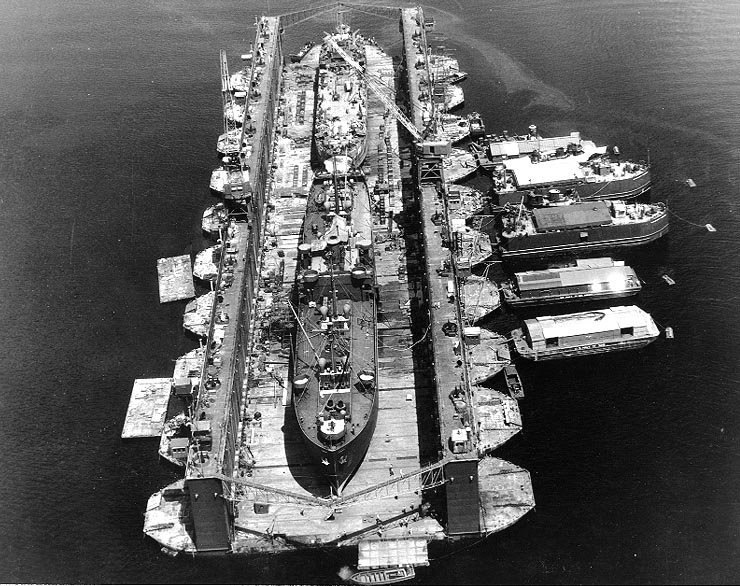
USS Artisan floating drydock

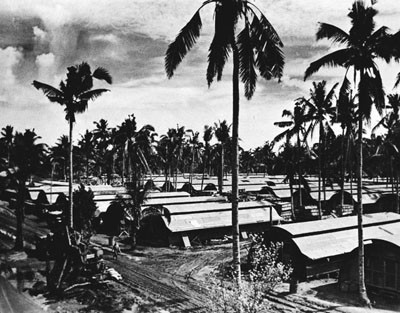
Quonset village at Tolosa in 1945. Housing for the Philippine Sea Frontier Headquarters.

Before Leyte–Samar Naval Base was built the United States had to clear out the Imperial Japanese Armed Forces from the Philippines. The first main Naval event was the Battle of the Philippine Sea from June 19, 1944 to June 20, 1944. The next was the Battle of Leyte Gulf from October 23, 1944 to October 26, 1944. Battle of Leyte Gulf and Battle of the Philippine Sea were two of the largest naval battle in history. The Battle off Samar was part of the Battle of Leyte Gulf on October 25, 1944. The United States Army landed at Leyte on October 20, 1944, the start, of the Battle of Leyte. Major fighting ended on December 26, 1944. On December 25, 1944, United States Seventh Fleet officially opened its headquarters in Leyte, with Task Group 72.7. Leyte–Samar Naval Base provided major logistic support for the Invasion of Lingayen Gulf on January 3, 1945. The base continued to grow and barracks ships APL-17 and APL-19 arrived in February 1945 to help with the housing shortage. On May 7, 1945, a large convoy departed the base at Ulithi, to move much of that base to Leyte–Samar Naval Base, taking operations closer the action. The convoy arrived on May 13. The second convoy departed May 19, this convoy included the floating drydock a 3,300-ton ARD-19. Also in May, the USS Ocelot arrived and was used a barracks ship for the quickly growing base. Many Merchant Navy ships started to arrive with supplies. fuel and ammunition. The ammunition ships SS Bluefield Victory and USS Amador arrived with needed shore and ship ammunition. Also in May the USS Ajax (AR-6) a repair ship arrived and started repair work on ships, late repairing typhoon damaged ships. With many ships in the Pacific War for such a long time, Leyte–Samar Base became a major ship repair depot. More floating dry docks were added to the base including: ARD-15, ARD-18, ADR-23, ADR-25, AFDL-32, and AFD-17. In June 1945 the base had its peak population of 72,000 Troops. On July 27, 1945 the massive USS Artisan floating drydock was assembled in Leyte Gulf. Artisan was able to dry dock and repair the Navy's largest ships, like battleships. Much of the base was abandoned after the war in 1945. Leyte–Samar Base was part of a treaty in 1947" Agreement Concerning Military Bases, Manila, 14 March 1947. That noted that Leyte–Samar Naval Base could be used by the United States if determined to be required by a military necessity. In 1947 the base was abandoned.

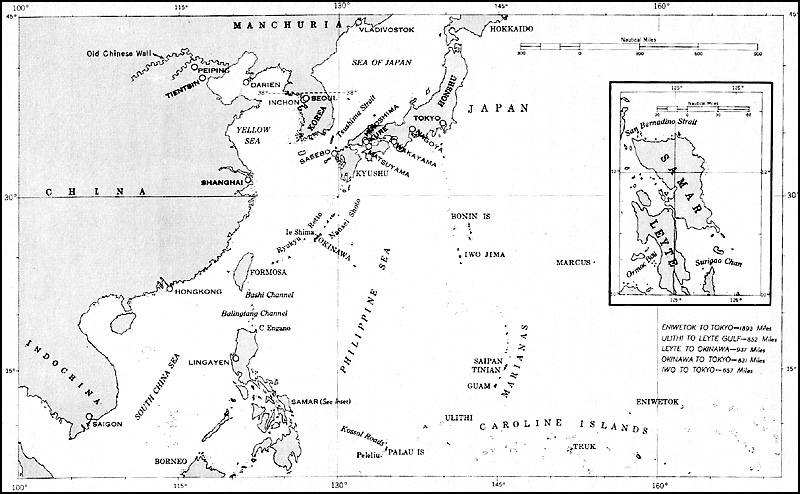
Map 1945 Philippines with South Pacific War sites

== Gallery ==
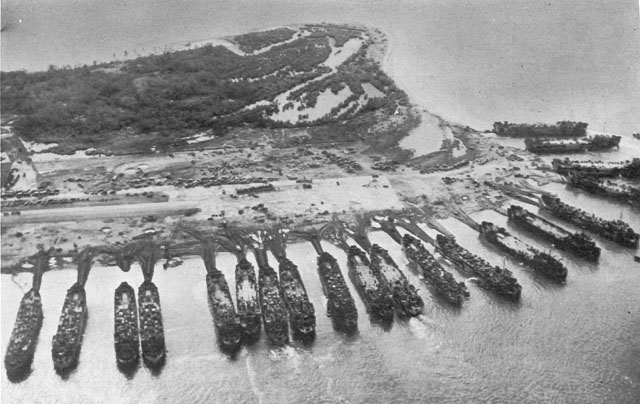
LSTs unloading at Leyte on 8 November 1944

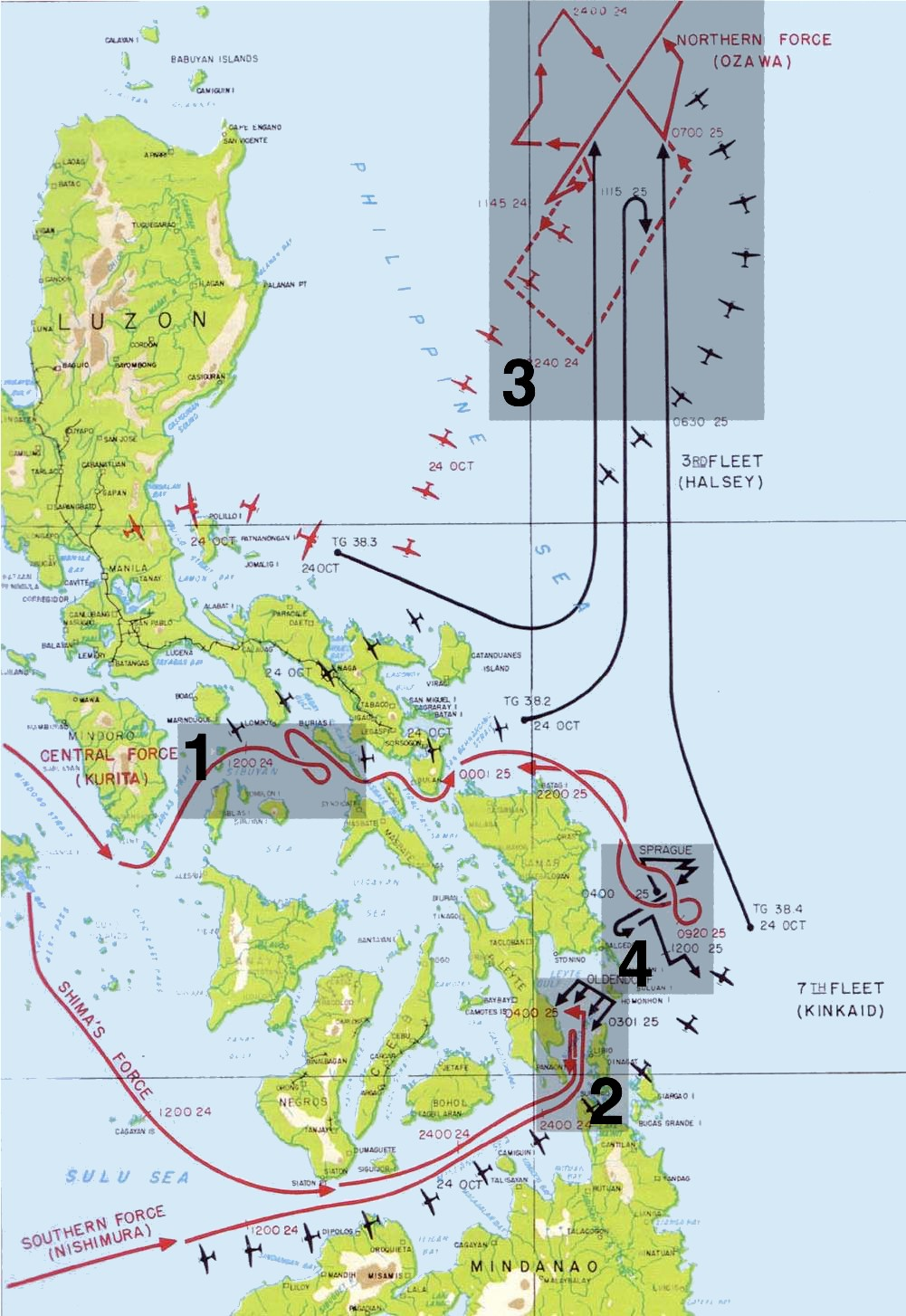
The four main actions in the Battle of Leyte Gulf: 1 Battle of the Sibuyan Sea 2 Battle of Surigao Strait 3 Battle off Cape Engaño 4 Battle off Samar. Leyte Gulf is north of 2 and west of 4. The island of Leyte is west of the gulf.

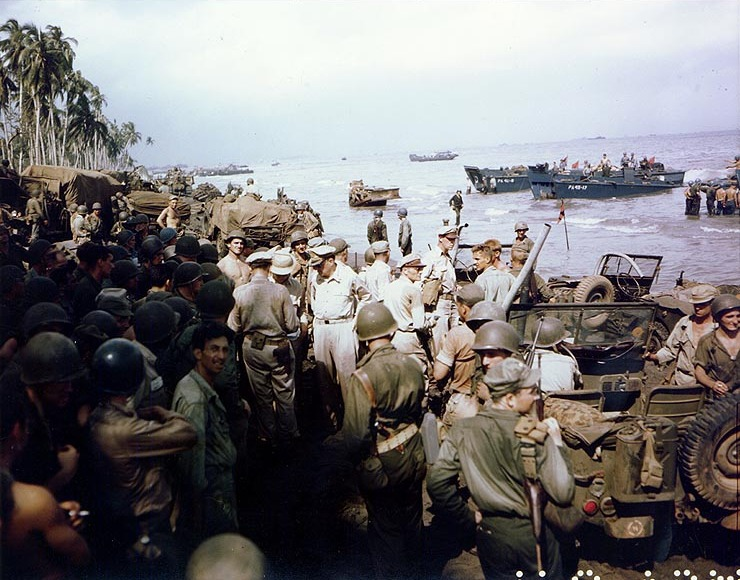
Leyte beachhead on 20 October 1944

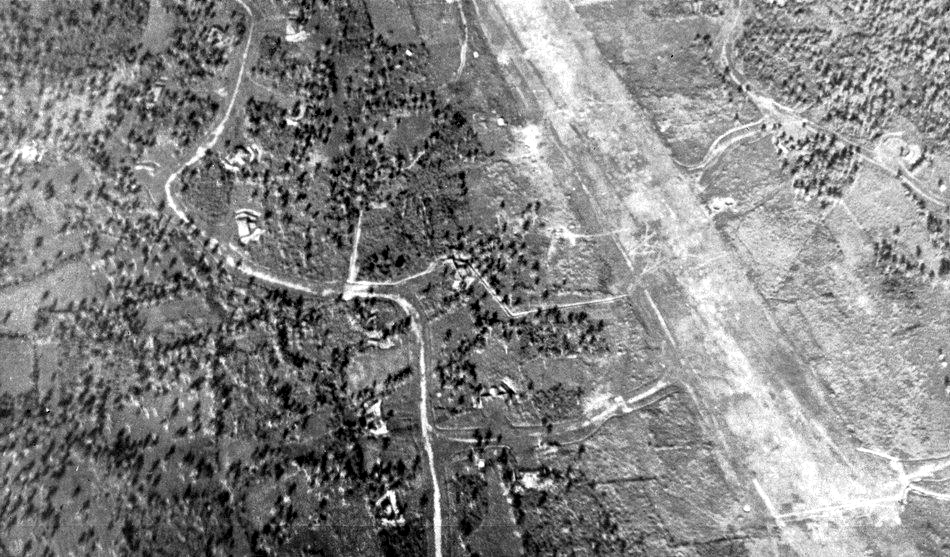
Dulag Airfield Leyte in 1944.

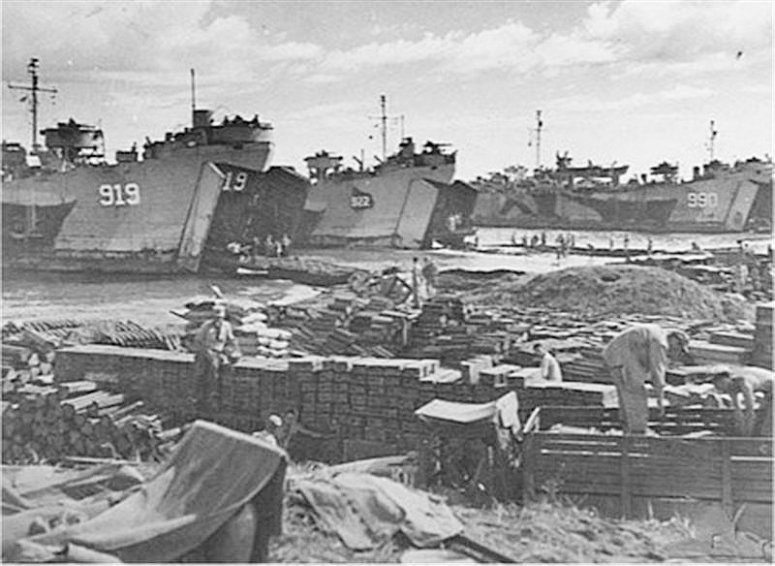
USS LST-919, LST-922, and LST-990 beached at Mindoro Island, Philippines, 15 December 1944, unloading supplies and equipment

== See also ==
- US Naval Base Philippines
- U.S. Naval Base Subic Bay
- Espiritu Santo Naval Base
- US Naval Advance Bases
- Naval Advance Base Saipan
- Service Squadron
- John R. Perry
