= USS Artisan =

US Navy floating drydock, 1943 to 1987

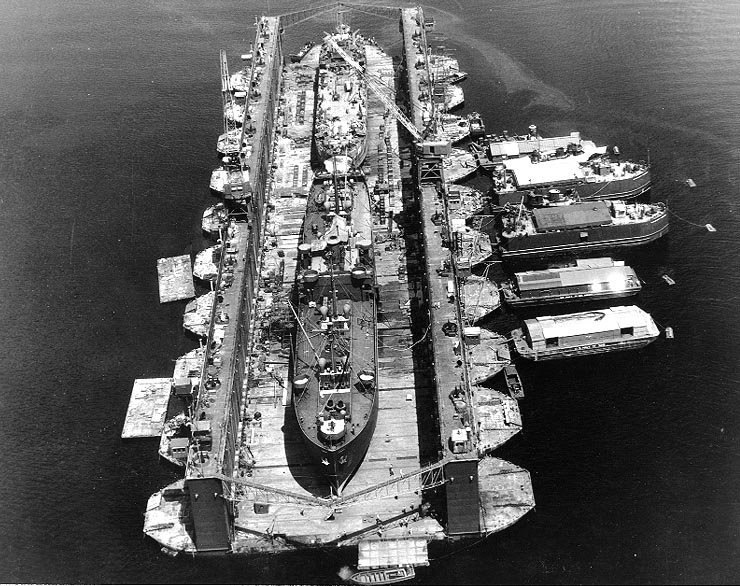
- Artisan with USS Antelope (IX-109) and LST-120 in the dock at Espiritu Santo Naval Base, Espiritu Santo, New Hebrides Islands, 8 January 1945

History

United States
- Name: Artisan
- Builder: Everett-Pacific Shipbuilding & Dry Dock Company; Chicago Bridge & Iron Company; Pollock-Stockton Shipbuilding Company
- Laid down: 1942 and 1943
- Commissioned: 10 May 1943
- Decommissioned: 1 March 1987
- Reclassified: Section C to IX-525, 2 March 1998; Section D to IX-521, 16 August 1996
- Stricken: 1 March 1987; 26 April 2006 (IX-521); 22 June 2009 (IX-525)
- Reinstated: March 1987
- Honors and awards: American Campaign Medal Asiatic-Pacific Campaign Medal World War II Victory Medal National Defense Service Medal
- Fate: Sections A,G – J sold for scrap; Section C sold 2010; Section D sold 2007; Section E sold; Section F disposed of as a target
- Status: Section B laid up at NISMF, Pearl Harbor, 1 March 1987

General characteristics
- Displacement: 38,500 (in ten sections)
- Length: 927 ft (283 m) (in ten sections)
- Beam: 256 ft 0 in (78.03 m)
- Height: 9 ft (2.7 m) floated, 78 ft (24 m) flooded
- Capacity: 90,000 tons lift
- Complement: 690 officers and men
- Armament: none

USS Artisan (ABSD-1), later redesignated as (AFDB-1), was a ten-section, non-self-propelled, large auxiliary floating drydock of the United States Navy. The only U.S. warship with this name, Artisan was constructed in sections during 1942 and 1943 by the Everett-Pacific Shipbuilding & Dry Dock Company, in Everett, Washington; the Chicago Bridge & Iron Company, in Eureka, California; the Pollock-Stockton Shipbuilding Company, in Stockton, California; and the Chicago Bridge & Iron Company, in Morgan City, Louisiana. This ship was commissioned at Everett, Washington, on 10 May 1943, Captain Andrew R. Mack in command. With all ten sections joined, she was 927 feet (283 m) long, 28 feet (8.5 m) tall (keel to welldeck), and with an inside clear width of 133 feet 7 inches (40.72 m).

Each section displaced 3,850 tons and was 256 feet (78 m) long, with an 80-foot (24 m) beam, and was 28 feet thick; side walls that rose to a height of 47 feet above the deck folded down toward each other for transport, and incorporated mountings for anti-aircraft guns in positionns from which they could be fired whether the walls were up or down. Each section incorporated 12 ballast tanks, giving them a lifting capacity of 10,000 tons, so the structure as a whole could loft 100,000 tons out of the water. The segments were towed separately to the location where the dock would be used, and were attached to each other side-to-side. With 3-foot (0.91 m) gaps left between segments, and a 50-foot (15 m) long platform extending off of each end. Each section had twelve ballast compartments.

ABSD-1 had a traveling crane with an 85-foot (26 m) radius and 15-ton capacity. The crane had six capstans for pulling, each rated at 24,000 lbf (110,000 N) at 30 ft/min (0.15 m/s), four of which were reversible.

She was generally deployed with two or more support barges.

== War service ==
In 1943, the new drydock was towed to the southwestern Pacific in two convoys. The pair of sections constructed on the Gulf Coast left Morgan City, Louisiana, on 14 July 1943. The eight sections built in Washington and California were towed to San Francisco, California, before putting to sea on 28 August 1943. The first two sections arrived at Espiritu Santo in the New Hebrides on 24 September; the West Coast sections on 2 October. Later that month, the crew began to assemble the ship. Thirteen sailors drowned on 2 November when one of its sections sank.

By the end of 1943, she was a working drydock of eight sections repairing a variety of Navy ships at Naval Advance Base Espiritu Santo. In April 1944, ABSD-1 became a full ten-section drydock when her remaining section was combined with another from ABSD-2 and was joined to the eight already functioning.

She served in the New Hebrides until mid-April 1945, when she received orders to move forward to the big base, Leyte-Samar Naval Base, at Leyte Gulf in the Philippines. ABSD-1 was disassembled for towing by the beginning of June and, on 30 June, the first six sections began the voyage, via Hollandia, New Guinea, to Leyte. The remaining four sections left on 7 July. The first group arrived at Manicani Island in Leyte Gulf, on 27 July, and assembly began three days later. On 2 August, the rest of the drydock entered Manicani Bay and, by mid-September, all ten sections had been rejoined. The floating drydock resumed repair work soon thereafter, and it continued through February 1946. On 28 February 1946, she undocked four-yard craft and began preparations for inactivation. ABSD-1 was decommissioned on 31 May 1946.

A sister drydock, USS ABSD-5, also repaired ships at Manicani Island from May 1945 to May 1946.

== Post-war service ==
She remained in the Philippines through the summer and fall of 1946. In August 1946, the advanced base sectional dock was reclassified a large auxiliary floating drydock and was redesignated AFDB-1. Sometime after November 1946, her sections were towed from the Philippines to Pearl Harbor where they were placed in reserve. Her inactivity lasted almost exactly five years. She was recommissioned at Pearl Harbor on 2 June 1951, Captain O. J. Stien, USNR, in command. Later that month, she was towed, in sections, to Guam in the Mariana Islands where the Navy was improving another repair facility in fairly close proximity to the combat zone in the year-old Korean War. Reporting for duty on 26 June 1951, she was not completely assembled and ready for duty until the beginning of March 1952.

Active at Apra Harbor not quite three years, AFBD-1 was out of commission again and back in reserve by January 1955. She remained inactive at Guam for a little more than 15 years. In 1970, five of her sections were moved to Subic Bay in the Philippines where the floating drydock was placed in service once again on 17 November 1970. Her third period of active service proved to be her longest lasting almost 16 years. On 7 June 1979, she was named Artisan. In October 1986, Artisan was placed out of service, and her name was struck from the Naval Vessel Register. In March 1987, however, Artisan received a reprieve when her name was reinstated on the Naval Vessel Register.

On 16 August 1996 her Section 1D was reclassified as unclassified miscellaneous vessel IX-521, and on 2 March 1998 her Section 1C was reclassified to IX-525.

IX-521 was struck from the Naval Vessel Register on 26 April 2006, and it was subsequently sold during 2007. IX-525 remained on the register until 22 June 2009 and it was also sold in 2010.

== Image gallery ==
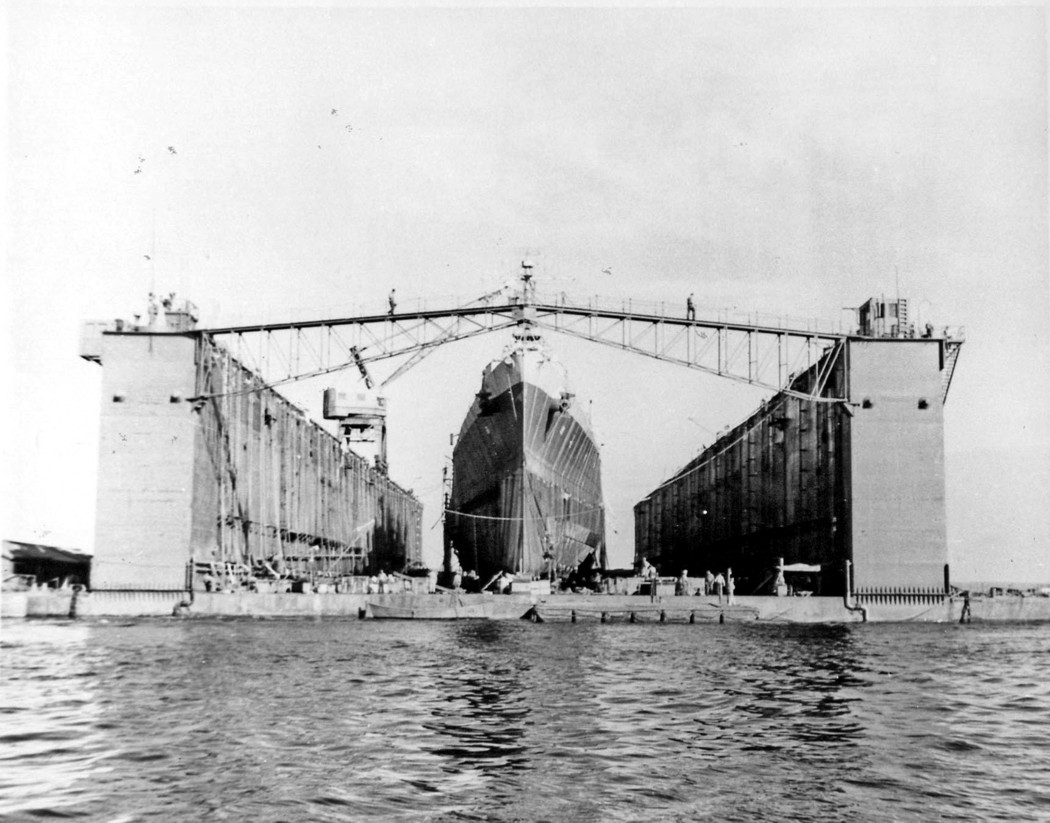
Columbia (CL-56) docked in Artisan ABSD-1

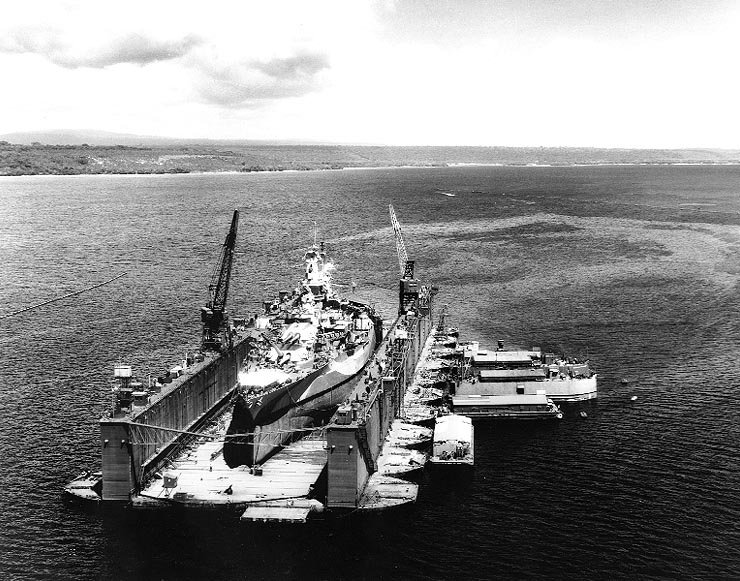
AFDB-1 with West Virginia (BB-48) high and dry in the dock
