= USS Mississippi (BB-41) =

Dreadnought battleship of the United States Navy

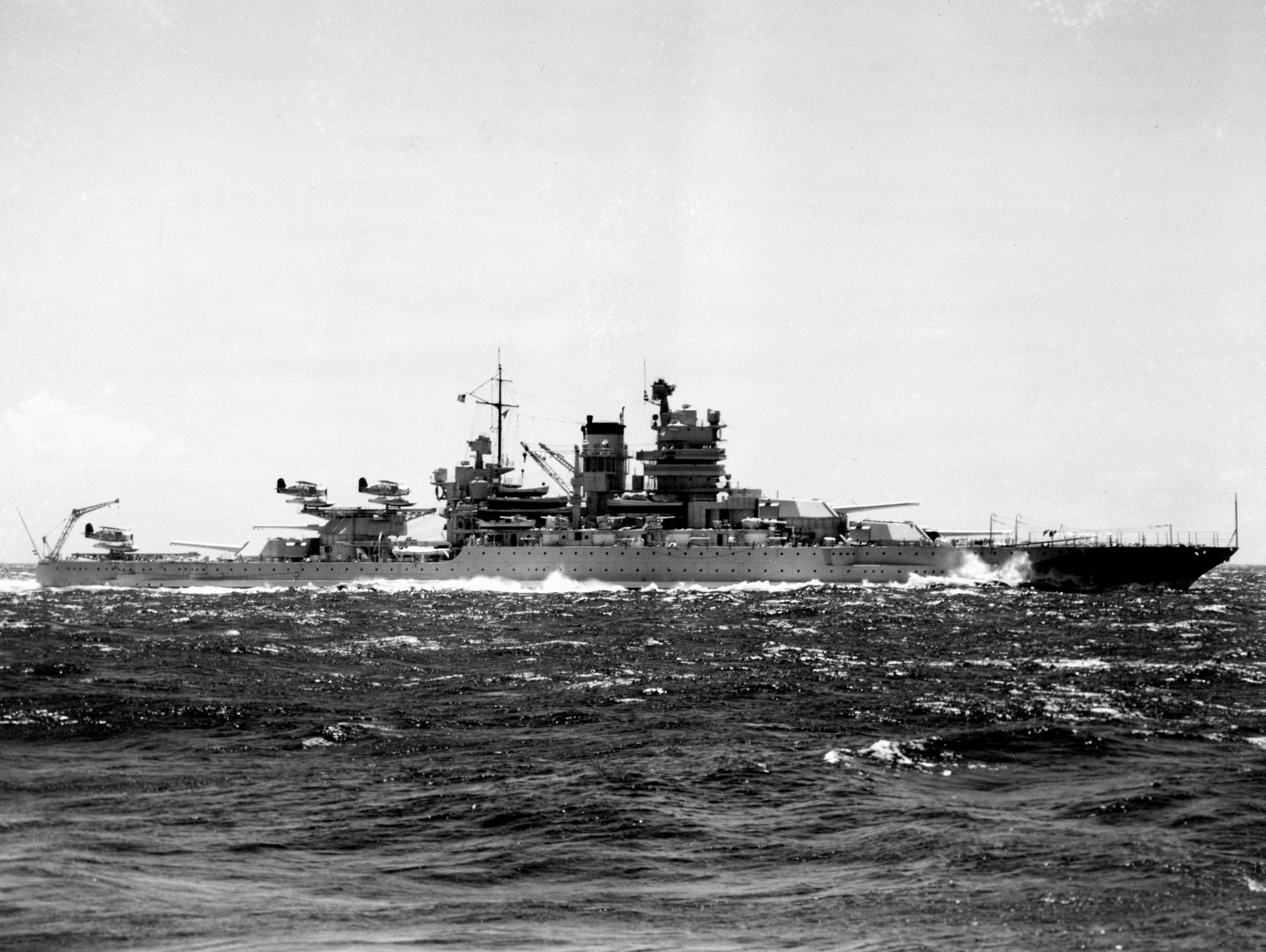
- USS Mississippi (BB-41) at sea in the late 1930s

History

United States
- Name: Mississippi
- Namesake: Mississippi
- Builder: Newport News Shipbuilding
- Laid down: 5 April 1915
- Launched: 25 January 1917
- Commissioned: 18 December 1917
- Decommissioned: 17 September 1956
- Stricken: 30 July 1956
- Honors and awards: 8 × battle stars
- Fate: Broken up, 1957

General characteristics
- Class & type: New Mexico-class battleship
- Displacement: Normal: 32,000 long tons (32,514 t); Full load: 33,000 long tons (33,530 t)
- Length: 624 ft (190 m)
- Beam: 97 ft 5 in (29.69 m)
- Draft: 30 ft (9.1 m)
- Installed power: 9 × Babcock & Wilcox boilers; 32,000 shp (24,000 kW)
- Propulsion: 4 × steam turbines; 4 × screw propellers
- Speed: 21 kn (39 km/h; 24 mph)
- Range: 8,000 nautical miles (15,000 km; 9,200 mi) at 10 kn (19 km/h; 12 mph)
- Complement: 55 officers; 1,026 enlisted
- Armament: 12 × 14 in (356 mm)/50 cal guns; 14 × 5 in (127 mm)/51 cal guns; 4 × 3 in (76 mm)/50 cal guns; 2 × Mark 8 21 in (533 mm) torpedo tubes
- Armor: Belt: 8–13.5 in (203–343 mm); Turret face: 18 in (457 mm); Conning tower: 16 in (406 mm); Decks: 3.5 in (89 mm)

USS Mississippi, hull number BB-41, the second of three members of the New Mexico class of battleship, was the third ship of the United States Navy named in honor of the 20th state. The ship was built at the Newport News Shipbuilding Company of Newport News, Virginia, from her keel laying in April 1915, her launching in January 1917, and her commissioning in December that year. She was armed with a battery of twelve 14-inch (356 mm) guns in four three-gun turrets, and was protected by heavy armor plate, with her main belt armor being 13.5 inches (343 mm) thick.

The ship remained in North American waters during World War I, conducting training exercises to work up the crew. Throughout the 1920s and 1930s, the ship served in the Pacific Fleet. In May 1941, with World War II and the Battle of the Atlantic raging, Mississippi and her two sister ships were transferred to the Atlantic Fleet to help protect American shipping through the Neutrality Patrols. Two days after the Japanese attack on Pearl Harbor, Mississippi departed the Atlantic to return to the Pacific Fleet; throughout her participation in World War II, she supported amphibious operations in the Pacific. She shelled Japanese forces during the Gilbert and Marshall Islands and the Philippines campaigns and the invasions of Peleliu and Okinawa. The Japanese fleet attacked American forces during the Philippines campaign, and in the ensuing Battle of Leyte Gulf, Mississippi took part in the Battle of Surigao Strait, the last battleship engagement in history.

After the war, Mississippi was converted into a gunnery training ship, re-designated AG-128, and was also used to test new weapons systems. These included the RIM-2 Terrier missile and the AUM-N-2 Petrel missile. She was eventually decommissioned in 1956 and sold to ship breakers in November that year.

== Design ==
Mississippi was 624 feet (190 m) long overall and had a beam of 97 ft 5 in (29.69 m) and a draft of 30 ft (9.1 m). She displaced 32,000 long tons (32,514 t) as designed and up to 33,000 long tons (33,530 t) at full combat load. The ship was powered by four-shaft Curtis turbines and nine oil-fired Babcock & Wilcox boilers rated at 32,000 shaft horsepower (24,000 kW), generating a top speed of 21 knots (39 km/h; 24 mph). The ship had a cruising range of 8,000 nautical miles (15,000 km; 9,200 mi) at a speed of 10 kn (19 km/h; 12 mph). Her crew numbered 1,081 officers and enlisted men. As built, she was fitted with two lattice masts with spotting tops for the main gun battery. The main armored belt was 8–13.5 in (203–343 mm) thick, while the main armored deck was up to 3.5 in (89 mm) thick. The main battery gun turrets had 18 in (457 mm) thick faces on 13 in (330 mm) barbettes. The conning tower had 16 in (406 mm) thick sides.

The ship was armed with a main battery of twelve 14-inch (356 mm)/50-caliber guns in four, three-gun turrets on the centerline, placed in two superfiring pairs forward and aft of the superstructure. Unlike earlier American battleships with triple turrets, these mounts were true three-gun barrels, in that each barrel could elevate independently. The secondary battery consisted of fourteen 5-inch (127 mm)/51-caliber guns mounted in individual casemates clustered in the superstructure amidships. Initially, the ship was to have been fitted with twenty-two of the guns, but experiences in the North Sea during World War I demonstrated that the additional guns, which would have been placed in the hull, would have been unusable in anything but calm seas. As a result, the casemates were plated over to prevent flooding. The secondary battery was augmented with four 3-inch (76 mm)/50-caliber guns. In addition to her gun armament, Mississippi was also fitted with two 21-inch (530 mm) torpedo tubes, mounted submerged in the hull, one on each broadside.

=== Modifications ===
Mississippi was heavily modernized in the early 1930s. Her original turbines were replaced with new geared models manufactured by Westinghouse, and she received six express boilers designed by the Bureau of Engineering. This improved her performance to a top speed of 22 knots (41 km/h; 25 mph) from 40,000 shaft horsepower (30,000 kW). Her armament was also revised, with the main battery turrets being modified to allow elevation to 30 degrees, greatly extending the range of the guns. Two of the 5-inch guns were removed, and eight 5-inch/25-caliber anti-aircraft guns were installed. She received an additional 2-inch (51 mm) armored deck, and her underwater protection was improved. Both lattice masts were removed; a heavy tower bridge was built in place of the fore mast, and a light pole mast was erected in place of the main mast. These alterations greatly increased her displacement, to 33,420 long tons (33,960 t) standard and 36,157 long tons (36,737 t) full load. Her crew increased significantly, to 1,443.

In early 1945, while under repair for combat damage, Mississippi received a new secondary battery. The old 51-caliber 5-inch guns were removed, and eight more of the 25-caliber anti-aircraft guns were installed, along with thirteen quadruple Bofors 40 mm mounts and forty 20 mm Oerlikon guns. To compensate for the added weight, the ship's armored conning tower was removed.

== Service history ==
The keel for Mississippi was laid down on 5 April 1915 at the Newport News Shipbuilding Company of Newport News, Virginia. She was launched on 25 January 1917, and after completing fitting-out work, was commissioned into the US Navy on 18 December 1917. Then-Captain Joseph Lee Jayne served as the ship's first commanding officer. After completing sea trials off Virginia, Mississippi departed the United States on 22 March 1918 for the Gulf of Guacanayabo in Cuba, where she conducted further training. From 1919 to 1921, William A. Moffett served as the ship's commander. On 31 January 1919, she left for another round of training in the Caribbean. Before the start of fleet maneuvers in March, Mississippi had a flying-off platform built atop her forward superfiring turret, and during the maneuvers that year, she operated a Hanriot HD.1. The ship launched the aircraft three times during the maneuvers, but as she had no landing facilities, the pilot had to land ashore and then be loaded back onto the platform. Later in the year, she returned to Hampton Roads, Virginia, where she began a cruise between Boston and New York.

Mississippi was then reassigned to the Pacific Fleet and she accordingly left the east coast on 19 July. Throughout the 1920s, the ship routinely returned to the Caribbean for winter training exercises. Two of the original fourteen 5-inch/51-caliber guns were removed in 1922. During Fleet Problem I, held in February 1923, Mississippi sank the old pre-dreadnought Coast Battleship No. 4 (formerly USS Iowa), battering her first with her 5-inch guns at ranges between 8,000 to 10,000 yards (7,300 to 9,100 m) before firing a salvo of 14-inch shells that struck Coast Battleship No. 4 amidships and inflicted fatal damage. During the gunnery exercise, spotter aircraft were used for the first time to help direct an American battleship's guns in a major exercise.

While conducting gunnery practice off San Pedro on 12 June 1924, there was an explosion in her forward superfiring Gun Turret No. 2. The resulting fire asphyxiated 44 members of the turret crew. Upon returning to port the gunpowder that was still in Gun No. 5, the remaining gun in the turret, exploded and killed four members of the rescue team. The shell that was in the gun narrowly missed the passenger ship Yale. This was, at the time, the deadliest peace-time disaster in the Navy's history.

She left San Francisco on 15 April 1925 for war games held off Hawaii, after which she went on a cruise to Australia, returning to California on 26 September. The ship returned to the east coast in early 1931 for a major modernization at Norfolk Navy Yard that began on 30 March. This overhaul significantly changed the ship's profile by removing the original fore and aft lattice mast. The former was replaced with a tower. Modernization also included replacement of earlier 3-inch/50 cal anti-aircraft guns with eight 5-inch/25-caliber guns. Further training exercises followed in September 1933. On 24 October 1934, she passed through the Panama Canal on her way back to the Pacific Fleet, where she remained through mid-1941, apart from the normal winter cruises in the Caribbean.

By this time, World War II had broken out in Europe, spawning the Battle of the Atlantic. In response, President Franklin D. Roosevelt initiated the Neutrality Patrols to protect American shipping. On 7 May 1941, Admiral Harold Rainsford Stark, the Chief of Naval Operations, transferred Mississippi, the battleships Idaho and New Mexico, the aircraft carrier Yorktown, four light cruisers, and two destroyer squadrons to the Atlantic to reinforce the Neutrality Patrols. On 15 June, Mississippi arrived back in Norfolk, where she prepared to make her first patrol in the North Atlantic, which consisted of escorting a convoy from Newport, Rhode Island, to Hvalfjordur, Iceland. She began another convoy escort mission on 28 September, also to Iceland. Mississippi remained there through November to protect American shipping in the area. During this period, she was assigned to the "White Patrol", a special task group, along with the other two battleships and a pair of heavy cruisers.

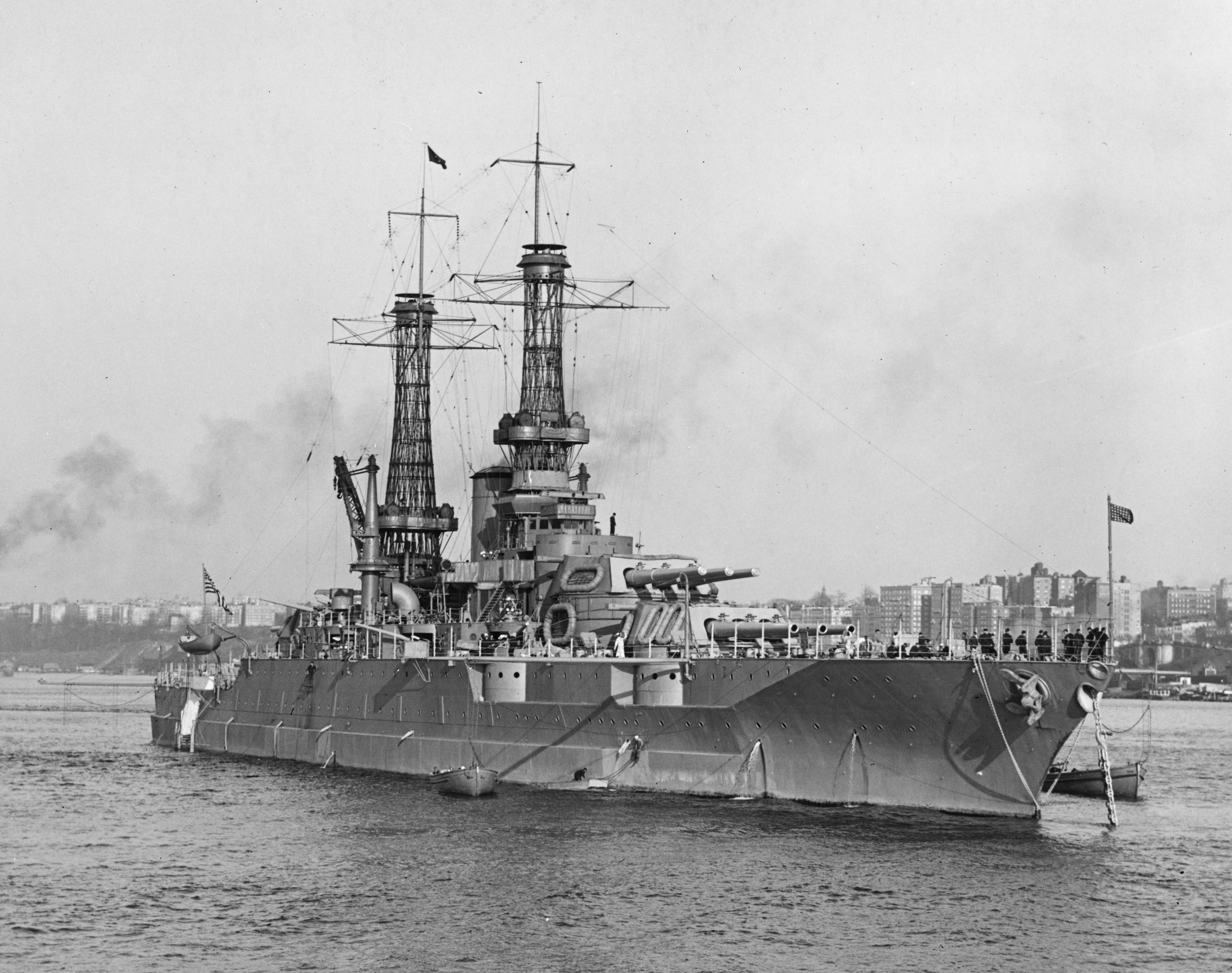
Mississippi anchored off New York City c. 1918

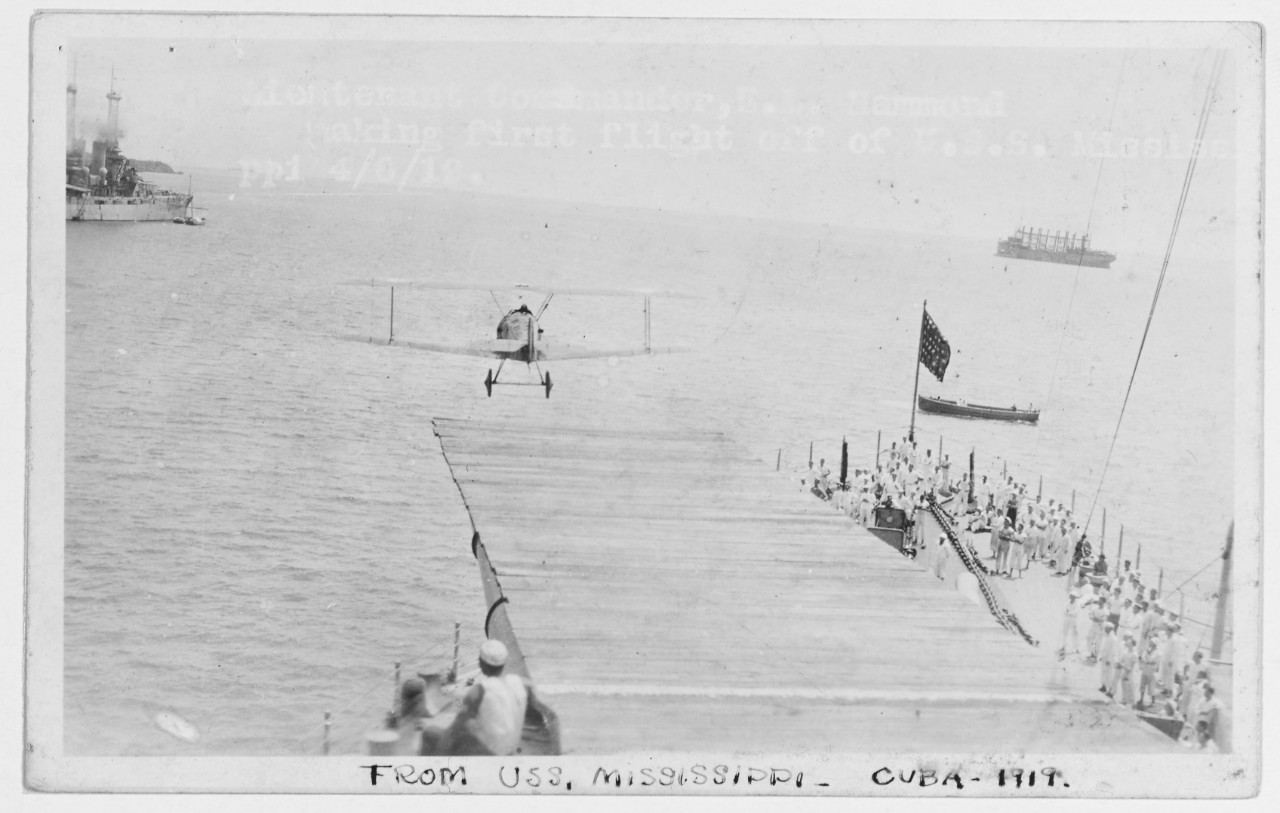
A Sopwith Camel takes off from Mississippi, 6 April 1919

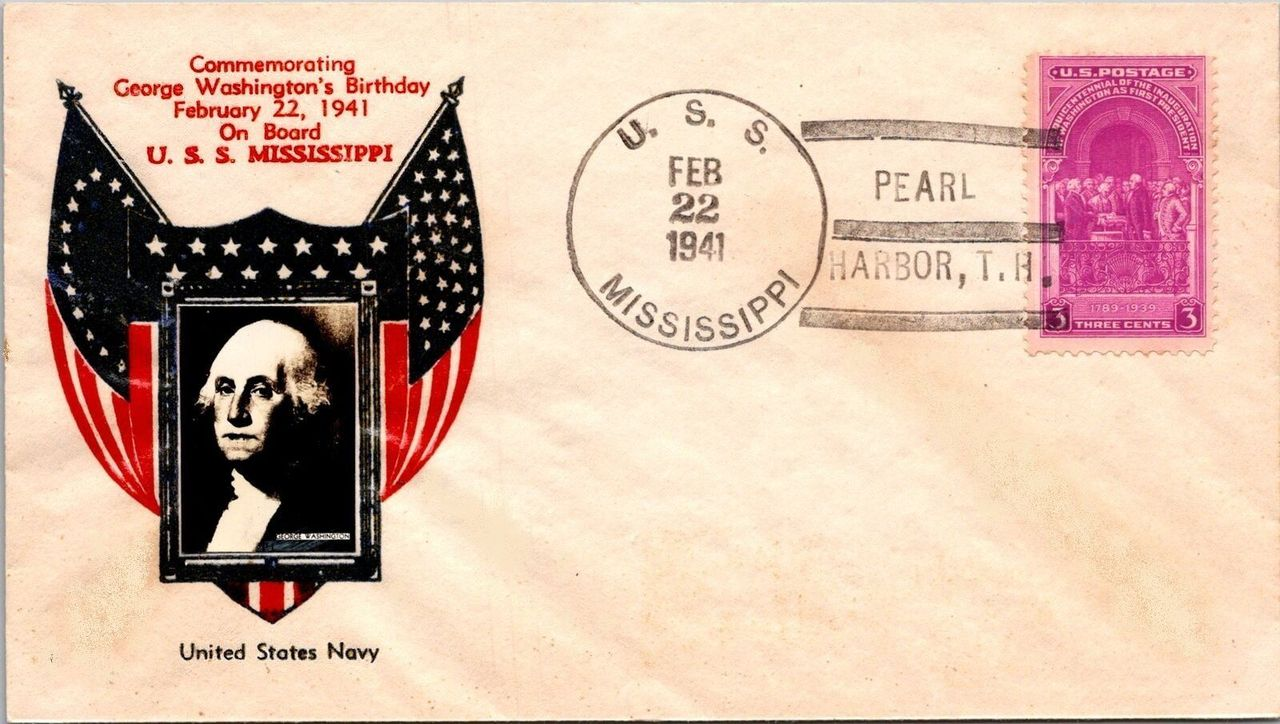
USS Mississippi, naval cover with ship's postmark. While at Pearl Harbor the Mississippi's crew celebrated Washington's birthday, 22 February 1941

=== World War II ===
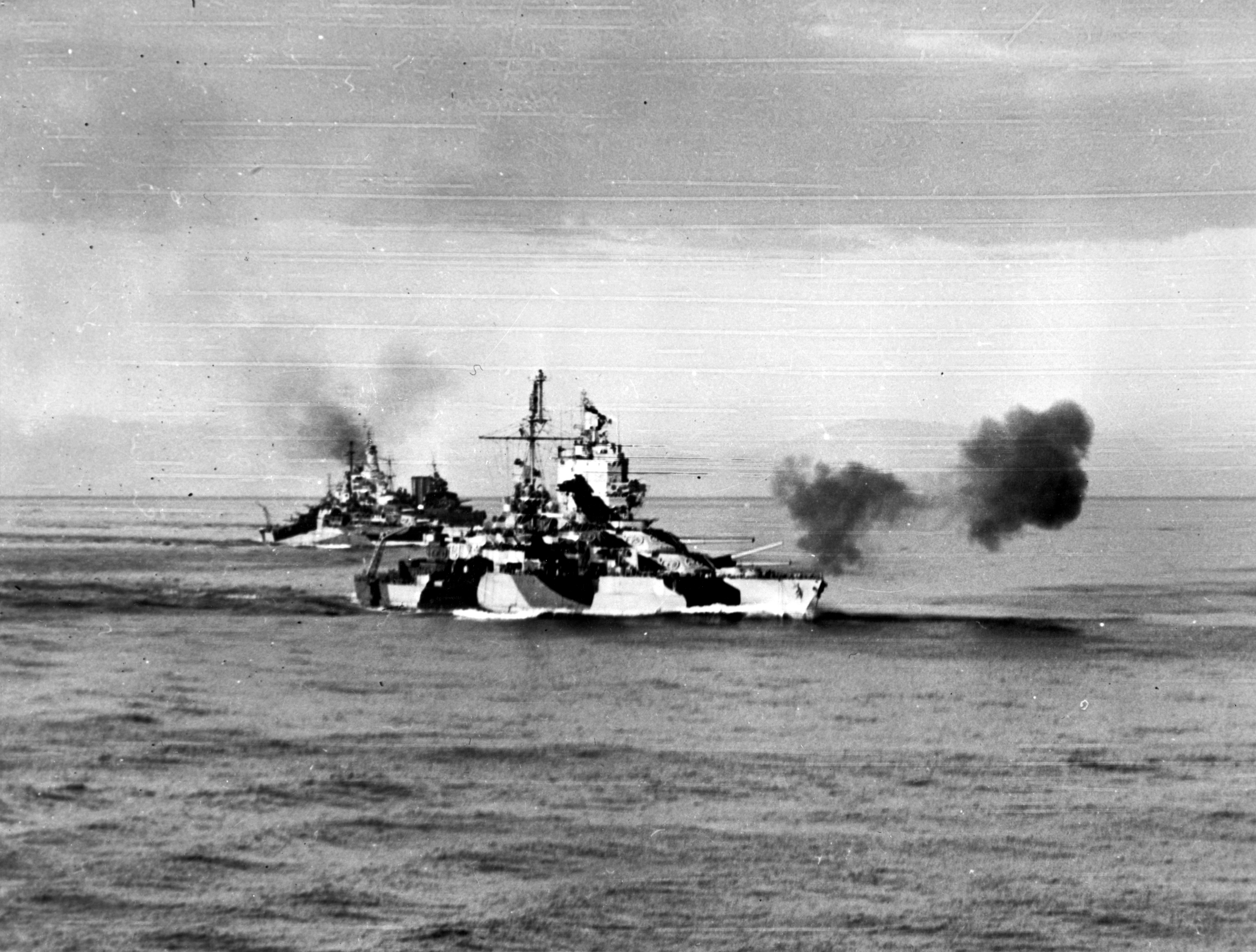
Mississippi supporting Lingayen Gulf landing. USS West Virginia and HMAS Shropshire are in the background.

On 9 December, two days after the Japanese attack on Pearl Harbor, Mississippi departed Iceland, bound for the Pacific Theater. She reached San Francisco on 22 January 1942, where she conducted training and escorted convoys along the west coast over the following seven months. Beginning in May 1942, the original 5-inch/51-caliber guns of the secondary battery were removed to make room for anti-aircraft machine guns. On 6 December, she escorted a convoy of troop ships to Fiji, returning to Pearl Harbor on 2 March 1943. Her first major combat operation began on 10 May, when she left Hawaii to support the liberation of the Aleutian Islands. She bombarded Kiska on 22 July, and the Japanese garrison withdrew from the island a few days later. After the conclusion of the campaign, Mississippi returned to San Francisco for an overhaul. On 19 October, she left San Pedro to join the invasion fleet that would attack the Gilbert Islands. During the Gilbert and Marshall Islands campaign on 20 November, while Mississippi was bombarding Makin, there was again an explosion in her No. 2 turret, this time killing 43 men. After repairs, she continued on in the campaign, bombarding Kwajalein on 31 January 1944, Taroa on 20 February, and Wotje on 21 February. On 15 March, she shelled Japanese positions at Kavieng on New Ireland, before returning to the United States for an overhaul in Puget Sound. This overhaul increased the number of 5-inch/25 cal guns from eight to fourteen.

After returning to the fleet, Mississippi provided gunfire support for the Marines that went ashore at Peleliu, bombarding Japanese positions on 12 September, three days before the landing. She remained there, shelling the island for a week, before proceeding on to Manus, which had recently been taken by American forces. Assigned to the invasion fleet for the Philippines under Rear Admiral Jesse B. Oldendorf, Mississippi left Manus on 12 October and arrived off Leyte on the 19th, when she began the coastal bombardment. During the Battle of Leyte Gulf, on the night of 24 October, Mississippi and the rest of the coastal bombardment battleships decisively defeated the Japanese Southern Force under Vice Admiral Shōji Nishimura in the Battle of Surigao Strait. During the battle, the Japanese warships failed to detect the American vessels with their radar. Additionally, the narrow strait forced the Japanese to steam in line ahead, while Mississippi and the other battleships were stationed at the entrance, where they were able to fire full broadsides. As a result, Nishimura was unable to avoid having his "T" crossed. In the ensuing action, American destroyers inflicted heavy damage on the Japanese force, which was then annihilated by the concentrated fire from the battleships. Mississippi, which was equipped with older fire control radar, had trouble identifying targets in the darkness, and so fired only one 12-gun salvo, after Oldendorf had given the order to cease fire. This salvo was the last fired in the action, and proved to be the last time a battleship fired its guns at another battleship.

Mississippi remained off Leyte, providing gunfire support until 16 November, when she withdrew to the Admiralty Islands to make preparations for the next operation. On 28 December, she returned to Leyte, anchoring in San Pedro Bay. The ship began shelling Japanese positions on the island of Luzon on 6 January 1945. During the bombardment, a Japanese kamikaze struck the ship, but she remained on station, bombarding the Japanese defenses, until 10 February, when she withdrew to Pearl Harbor for repairs. She returned to service in time to join the invasion fleet that attacked Okinawa, arriving off Nakagusuku Wan on 6 May. She shelled Shuri Castle, inflicting heavy damage on a major strongpoint in the Japanese defensive line. Another kamikaze (initially identified as a friendly plane) hit the ship on 5 June, but she remained in action off Okinawa until 16 June. In July 1945 she had repairs done in USS ABSD-5, a floating repair dry dock. After the Japanese government announced it would surrender, Mississippi steamed to Sagami Wan, Honshū, as part of the occupation force, arriving there on 27 August. She was present during the signing of the surrender documents on 2 September in Tokyo Bay. Four days later, she left Japanese waters, bound for the United States. She reached Norfolk on 27 November.

=== Postwar career ===
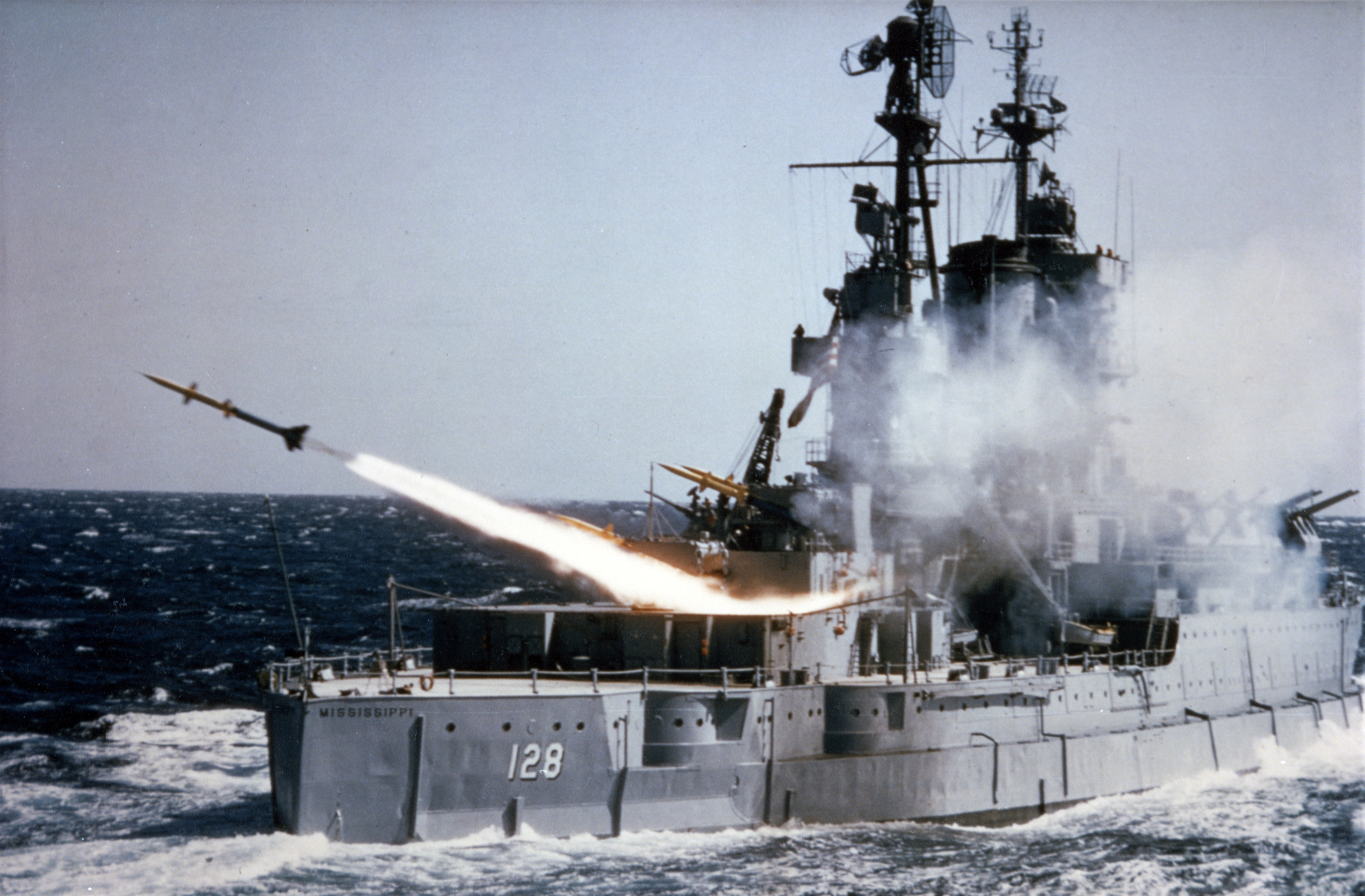
USS Mississippi firing a Terrier missile

Upon arriving in Norfolk, the ship was converted into a gunnery training ship, and was assigned the hull number AG-128 on 15 February 1946. In some references her hull number is given as EAG-128. The initially planned armament as a training ship differed somewhat from that actually installed. No. 1 turret was replaced by a twin 6-inch (152 mm)/47-caliber dual-purpose turret, the same as mounted on the Worcester class light cruisers. No. 2 and No. 3 14-inch turrets were removed, but No. 4 turret was initially retained. Three twin 5-inch (127 mm)/38-caliber dual-purpose mounts, two single 5-inch/54-caliber dual-purpose mounts (as on the Midway class aircraft carriers), two twin 3-inch (76 mm)/50-caliber mounts, and two 40 mm Bofors quad mounts were installed. Additional weapons proposed but not equipped included two twin 5-inch/54-caliber mounts and two twin 3-inch/70-caliber mounts, but the twin 5-inch/54 mount (originally for the Montana-class battleships) never entered service and the 3-inch/70 mount was not ready until 1956. Also, a triple 8-inch/55-caliber rapid-fire turret as on the Des Moines class heavy cruisers was proposed in place of No. 3 14-inch turret, but this was not equipped. It is unclear if a proposed mixed 20 mm Oerlikon battery of quadruple, twin, and single mounts was installed.

Mississippi was reconstructed at the Norfolk Naval Shipyard from November 1945 through April 1948. During the yard period she served as the flagship of the operational development force from 18 March to 15 May 1947, and as the flagship of Battleships-Cruisers Atlantic Fleet (COMBATCRULANT) from 11 June to 14 July 1947. In April 1947 she effectively replaced Wyoming as an anti-aircraft training ship, with Wyoming mooring at a pier across from Mississippi and the bulk of Wyoming's crew "cross-decking" to Mississippi. After emerging from the reconstruction, she served in the operational development force, carrying out gunnery tests and helping evaluate new weapon systems. The ship had two new RIM-2 Terrier missile launchers installed in 1952 with No. 4 turret removed, the work being completed on 9 August at the Norfolk Naval Shipyard. The first test firings of a ship-borne Terrier missile took place on 28–29 January 1953 off Cape Cod. Mississippi later tested the Petrel missile, a radar-homing weapon, in February 1956. On 17 September, Mississippi was decommissioned at Norfolk, sold for scrap to Bethlehem Steel on 28 November, and subsequently broken up. A single 14-inch/50-caliber gun from the ship remains and is located in Bethlehem, Pennsylvania.
