= Manicani Island =

Island in the Philippines

Manicani
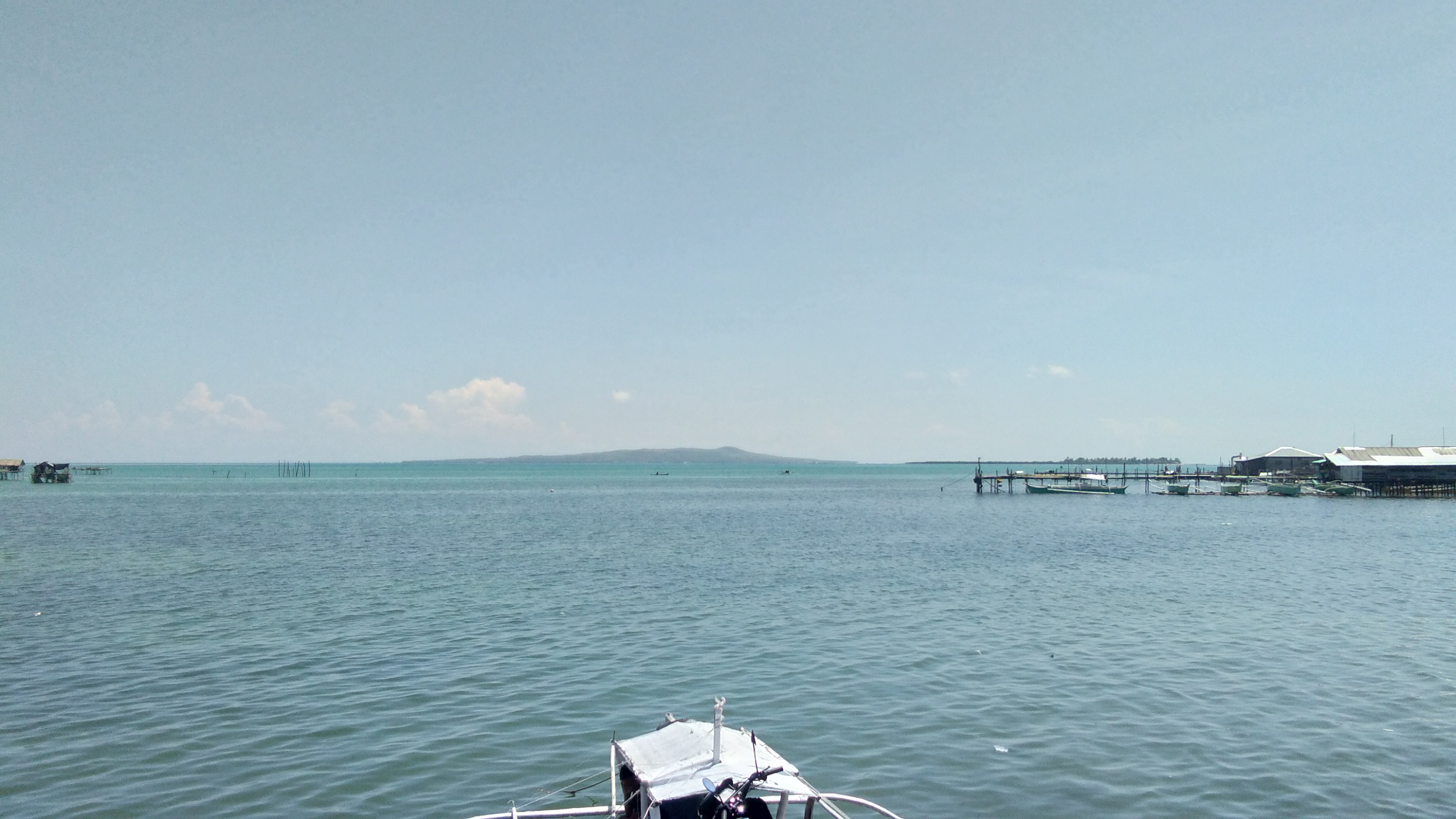
- Manicani Island, Guiuan, Eastern Samar (view towards the West from the Guiuan Integrated Transport Terminal)

- Location within Philippines

Geography
- Coordinates: 10°59′31″N 125°38′13″E
- Adjacent to: Leyte Gulf

Administration
- Philippines
- Region: Eastern Visayas
- Province: Eastern Samar
- Municipality: Guiuan

Demographics
- Population: 3,000

Manicani is a small island in Leyte Gulf, Philippines. The local governing body is the municipality of Guiuan of Eastern Samar province. Its 3,000 residents live in four barangays: San Jose, Banaag, Hamorawon and Buenavista. Housing and construction is mostly simple timber or concrete huts without power or plumbing.

== History ==
=== Second World War ===
During World War II, the US Navy transformed Manicani into a major naval repair facility, Leyte-Samar Naval Base. It was built to carry out maintenance and repairs to any of the ships in the fleet. The facility included housing for 10,000 people, a mess hall, shops, administration buildings, and an outdoor movie theater. In addition, the USS Artisan (AFDB-1) and USS ABSD-5 were brought to Manicani. Upon leaving Manicani, all buildings and utilities were dismantled and removed by US Navy personnel.

=== Typhoon Yolanda ===
Manicani Island suffered a direct hit from Typhoon Haiyan (locally known as Yolanda). Almost every home was obliterated including a church with 42 people taking refuge inside. Contrary to media reports the island was not evacuated. Many spent the majority of the storm without shelter. It took more than a week for aid to reach Manicani.

== Manicani Mine ==
The Hinatuan Mining Corporation (HMC), a Nickel Asia (NAC) subsidiary, acquired the rights to the Manicani site in 1987, with the first recorded commercial shipments from the mine coming in 1992. HMC ceased operations in 1994 due to falling nickel prices. In 2001, despite fierce local opposition, mining resumed. In May 2001 protesting locals clashed with HMC. A Manicani local and two others were seriously wounded when a vehicle rammed the picket lines. Also in 2001, due to the destruction of the delicate ecosystem the HMC was issued a suspension order.

In 2005 HMC was granted a permit to remove stockpiles. Allegations of human rights abuses arose when 70 protesters were violently dispersed by police. In June 2012 one of Nickle Asia's other subsidiaries, Samar Nickel Resource Corp, filed criminal charges when members of an anti-mining group blockaded the port to stop delivery of a vehicle meant to transport schoolchildren around the island.

=== Effects of mining ===
Open pit nickel mine mining, like the one used on Manicani has been outlawed in many countries due to the devastating ecological effects.

"Manicani Island nickel mining has reduced the amount of land available to farmers and siltation into the ocean has adversely impacted fishing; before mining, agriculture and aquaculture could sustain the people of Manicani Island but now they have been made poorer." - Journal of Geography and Geology, 2013

== See also ==
- List of islands in the Philippines
