= USS ABSD-5 =

WWII American floating drydock

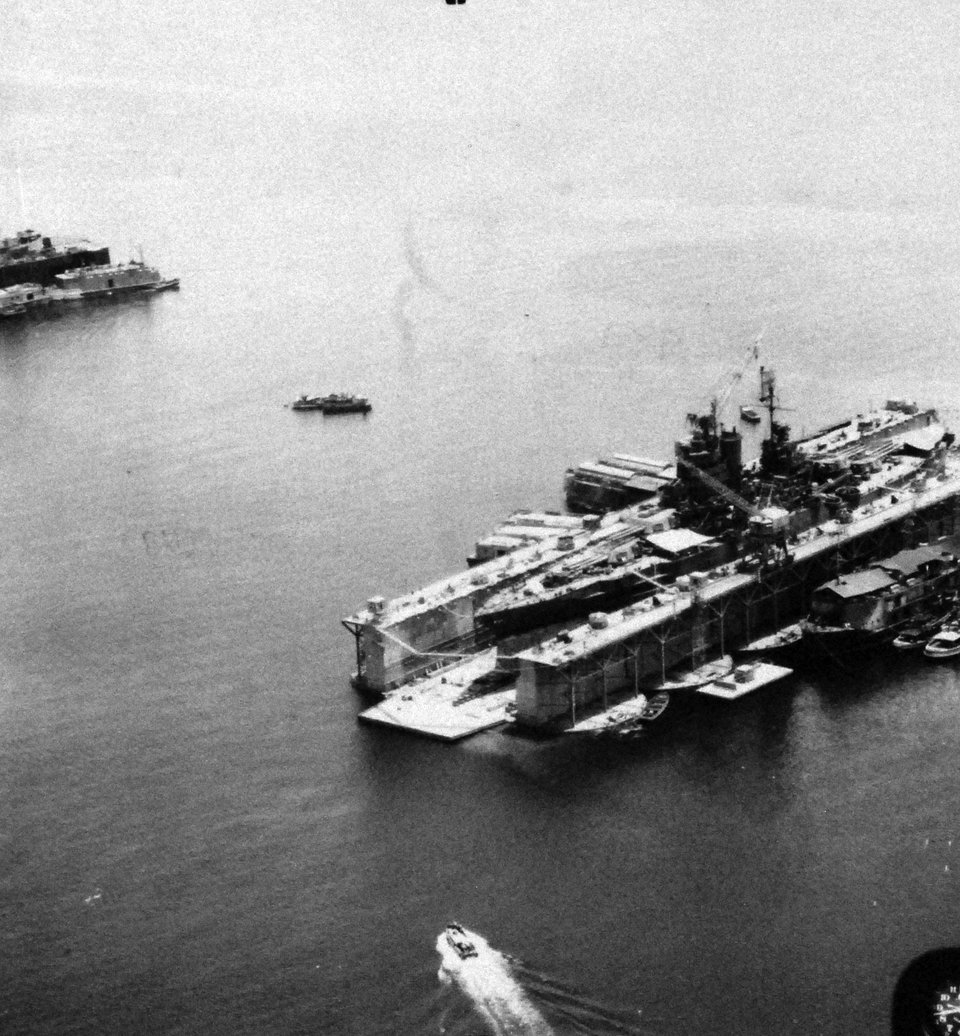
- ABSD-5 at Manicani Island, Philippines repairing USS Mississippi in July 1945

History

United States
- Name: USS AFDB-5- ABSD-5
- Owner: US Navy
- Operator: US Navy
- Builder: Chicago Bridge & Iron Company in Morgan City, Louisiana
- Laid down: 1943 and 1944
- Sponsored by: Mrs. John P. Millon
- Completed: 1944
- Commissioned: 15 June 1944
- Recommissioned: 1946 to AFDB-5
- Out of service: May 1946
- Stricken: 15 April 1989
- Honors and awards: American Campaign Medal Asiatic-Pacific Campaign Medal World War II Victory Medal
- Fate: Scrapped in 1997

General characteristics
- Displacement: 30,800 (in nine sections, (A-G)
- Length: 825 ft (251 m) (in nine sections)
- Beam: 256 ft 0 in (78.03 m)
- Height: 9 ft (2.7 m) floated, 78 ft (24 m) flooded
- Propulsion: none
- Capacity: 90,000 tons lift
- Complement: 690 officers and men
- Armament: 14 × 40 mm (1.6 in) guns; 14 × 20 mm (0.79 in) guns

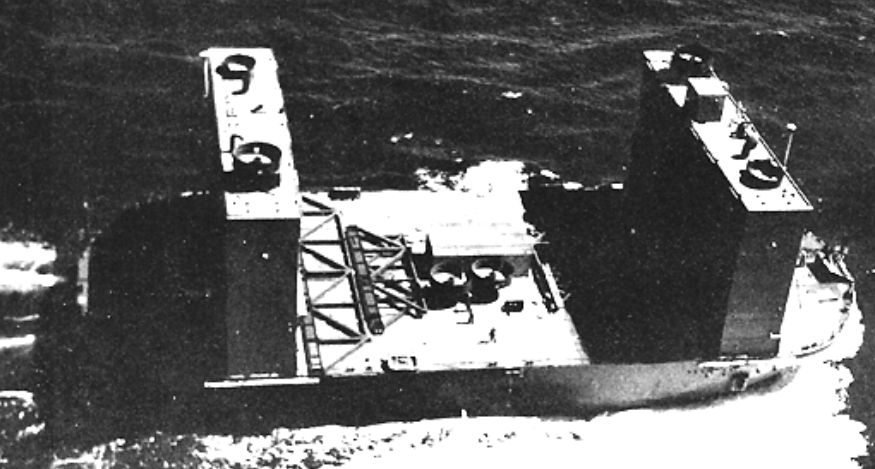
One Advance Base Sectional Dock (ABSD) section under tow with float wings up in 1944

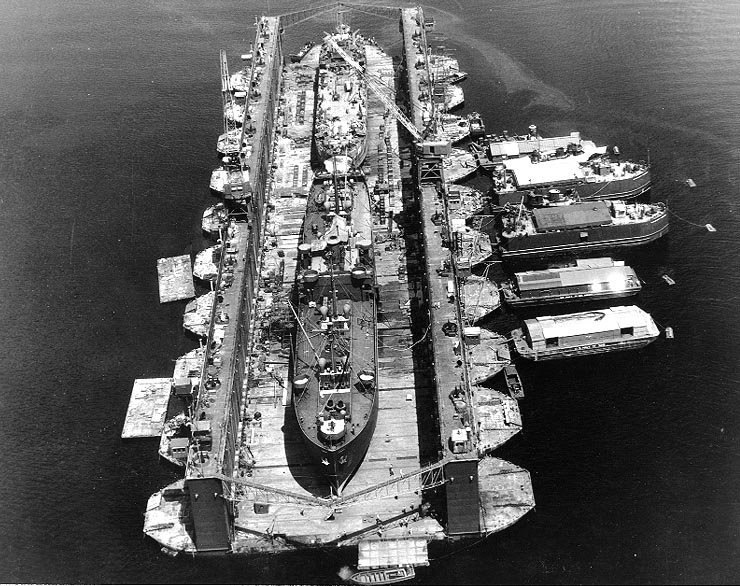
USS Artisan (ABSD-1), USS ABSD-5 sister ship, with USS Antelope (IX-109) and LST-120 in the dock at Espiritu Santo, New Hebrides Islands, 8 January 1945, before moving to Manicani Island

USS ABSD-5, later redesignated as AFDB-5, was a nine-section, non-self-propelled, large auxiliary floating drydock of the US Navy. Advance Base Sectional Dock-5 (Auxiliary Floating Dock Big-5) was constructed in sections during 1943 and 1944 by the Chicago Bridge & Iron Company in Morgan City, Louisiana for World War II. With all nine sections joined, she was 825 feet long, 28 feet tall (keel to welldeck), and with an inside clear width of 133 feet 7 inches. ABSD-5 had two traveling 15-ton capacity crane with an 85-foot radius and two or more support barges. The two side walls were folded down under tow to reduce wind resistance and lower the center of gravity. ABSD-5 had 6 capstans for pulling, each rated at 24,000 lbf (110,000 N) at 30 ft/min (0.15 m/s), 4 of the capstans were reversible. There were also 4 ballast compartments in each section.

== World War II ==
In May 1945 ABSD-5 started repairing ships in the Asiatic-Pacific Theater of war. ABSD-5 departed New Orleans, Louisiana on 18 November 1944, arriving at the Panama Canal on 29 November 1944. One section was towed with War Shipping Administration's ocean tugboat St. Simon and another section was towed by USS Undaunted (ATA-199). After crossing the Pacific Ocean in convoys the nine sections arrived in Leyte on 24 February 1945, with assembly completed in May 1945. Naval Construction Battalion Detachment 1055 and 1053 assembled ABSD-5.

ABSD-5 was stationed at Leyte-Samar Naval Base's Manicani Island, a small island in Leyte Gulf of the Philippines, near Guiuan, Samar. ABSD-5 repaired the large ships in the US Navy and United Kingdom's Royal Navy. Able to lift 90,000 tons, ABSD-5 could raise large ships, like aircraft carriers, battleships, cruisers, and large auxiliary ships, out of the water for repair below the ship's waterline. She was also used to repair multiple smaller ships at the same time. Ships in continuous use during war need repair both from wear and from war damage from naval mine and torpedoes. Rudders and propellers are best serviced on dry docks.

Without ABSD-5 and her sister ships, at remote locations months could be lost in a ships returning to a home port for repair. ABSD-5 had provisions for the repair crew, such as bunk beds, meals, and laundry. ABSD-4 had power stations, ballast pumps, repair shops, machine shops, and mess halls to be self-sustaining. ABSD-2 had two rail track moveable cranes able to lift tons of material and parts for removing damage parts and install new parts. USS Audubon (APA-149), a Haskell-class attack transport repaired in August 1945 is one of the many ships repaired in ABSD-5. USS Mississippi (BB-41) was repaired in ABSD-5. Due to the Mississippi's 30 ft (9.1 m) draft with a full load, the battleship had to unload much of her ammunition and fuel oil before entering AFDB-5. USS Mount Olympus, a Mount McKinley-class command ship was repaired in August 1945. The cargo ship USS Alcona was repaired in November 1945. USS Indianapolis (CA-35) repaired April 1945. On 15 October 1945 USS Ashland (LSD-1) entered AFDB-5 for repairs.

For the crew to live in the Navy had barracks ships called APL, that dock next to AFDB-5. In September 1945 USS Artisan (ABSD-1), which had been operating at Espiritu Santo's Espiritu Santo Naval Base in the New Hebrides, started repairing ships at Manicani Island with ABSD-5. The sections of USS Artisan (ABSD-1) had started arriving at Manicani Island in July 1945.

== Post-war ==
After the war, ABSD-5 was reclassified AFDB-5, in April 1946 AFDB-5 was disassembled and towed to Sabine River at the Naval Air Station, Port Arthur, Texas, near Orange, Texas in 1984. AFDB-5 was struck from the Naval Register on 12 January 1984. AFDB-5 was scrapped in 1997.

== See also ==
- Dry dock
- Heavy-lift ship
- Hughes Mining Barge
- PD-50, Russia's largest floating dry dock
- Semi-submersible naval vessel
- Semi-submersible platform
