= Lawaan =

Municipality in Eastern Samar, Philippines

- Municipality
- Municipality of Lawaan
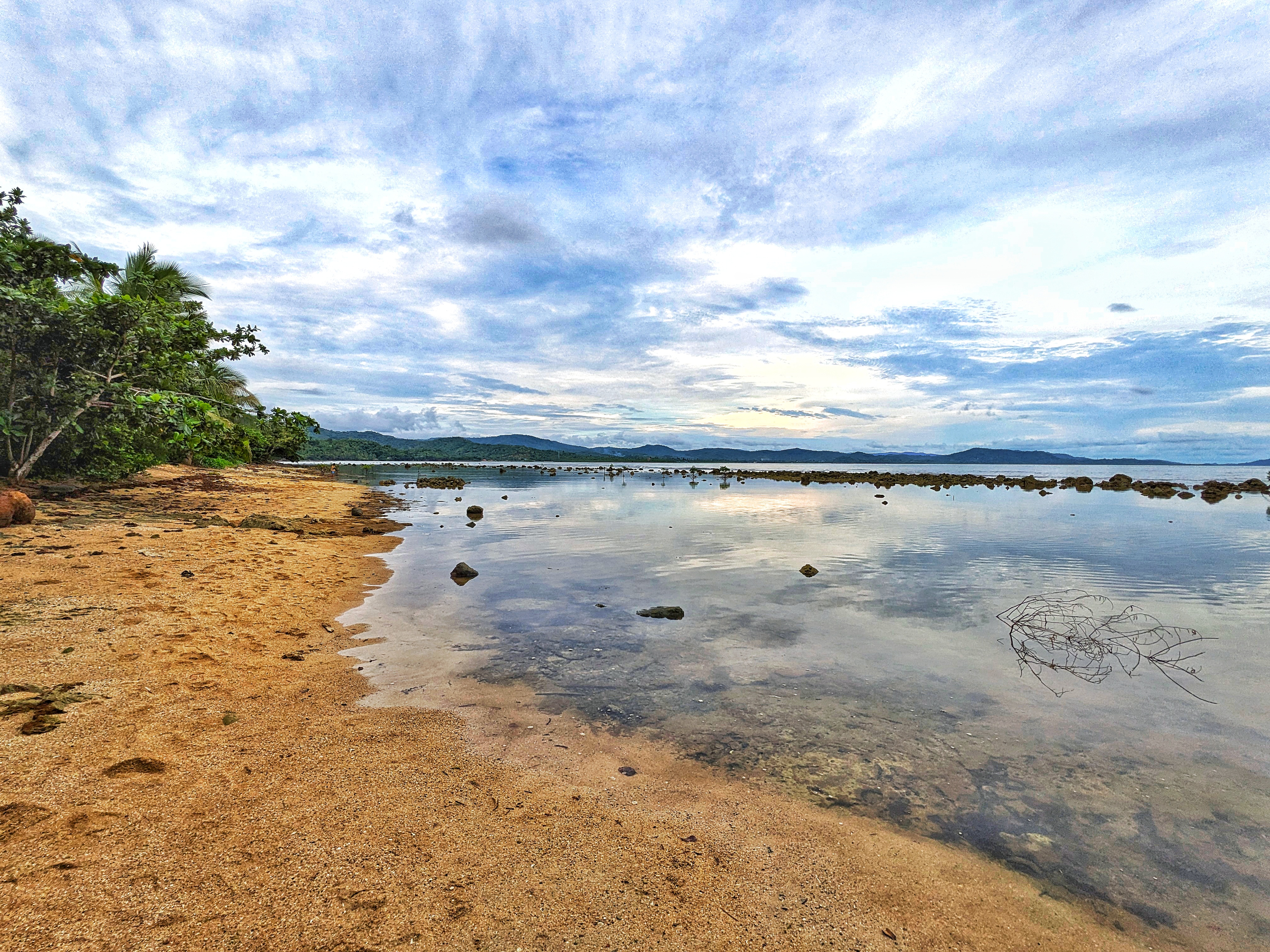
- Olot White Beach in Barangay Bolusao

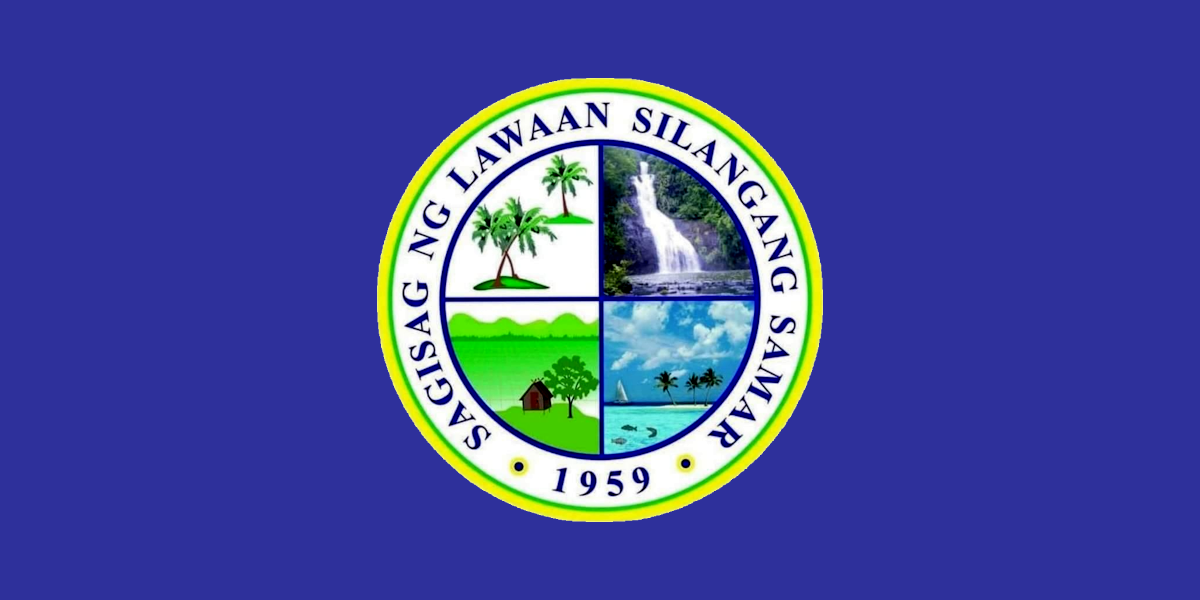
- Flag
- Nickname: Gateway to Eastern Samar
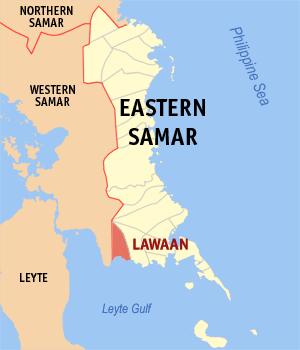
- Map of Eastern Samar with Lawaan highlighted
- Interactive map of Lawaan
- Location within the Philippines
- Coordinates: 11°08′27″N 125°18′04″E
- Country: Philippines
- Region: Eastern Visayas
- Province: Eastern Samar
- District: Lone district
- Barangays: 16 (see Barangays)

Government
  - Type: Sangguniang Bayan
  - Mayor: Athene L. Mendros
  - Vice Mayor: Ravi Parker G. Inciso
  - Representative: Maria Fe R. Abunda
  - Councilors: List: • Beryl Sharon G. Tolentino; • Erico O. Dacuno; • Raul C. Gade; • Rolando G. Gaylon; • Quirilo C. Ecaldre; • Nelia G. Miralles; • Marilyn G. Abayan; • Fritzie E. Gacho; DILG Masterlist of Officials
  - Electorate: 10,573 voters (2025)

Area
  - Total: 162.56 km^{2} (62.76 sq mi)
- Elevation: 63 m (207 ft)
- Highest elevation: 422 m (1,385 ft)
- Lowest elevation: 0 m (0 ft)

Population (2024 census)
  - Total: 13,063
  - Density: 80.358/km^{2} (208.13/sq mi)
  - Households: 3,213

Economy
  - Income class: 4th municipal income class
  - Poverty incidence: 26.89% (2023)
  - Revenue: ₱ 130.6 million (2024)
  - Assets: ₱ 366.4 million (2024)
  - Expenditure: ₱ 136.7 million (2024)
  - Liabilities: ₱ 216.1 million (2024)

Service provider
  - Electricity: Eastern Samar Electric Cooperative (ESAMELCO)
- Time zone: UTC+8 (PST)
- ZIP code: 6813
- PSGC: 0802612000
- IDD : area code: +63 (0)55
- Native languages: Waray; Tagalog
- Website: www.lawaan-esamar.gov.ph

Lawaan, officially the Municipality of Lawaan (Waray: Bungto han Lawaan; Tagalog: Bayan ng Lawaan), is a municipality in the province of Eastern Samar, Philippines. According to the 2024 census, it has a population of 13,063 people. It is home to Bolusao Watershed Forest Reserve, primarily located in Barangay Bolusao.

Lawaan is the historical hometown of the legendary sundang-wielding fighters in women's clothing during the 1901 Battle of Balangiga. Being a town adjacent to the Samar Island Natural Park - the country's largest terrestrial protected area - the land has vast natural landscapes and wildlife sanctuaries. Numerous waterfalls such as Amandaraga, Amanjuray, Pangi and Ban-awan dot the vast Bolusao Watershed Forest Reserve. Off the coast, white-sand islets also abound the town's horizon.

== History ==
An enterprising young couple by the names of Juan (Guingot) Gabrillo and his wife Etifania Halbay, together with their children, set sail one day in a small sailboat from Guiuan, in search of a greener pasture of an ideal place to settle. On their westward journey along the wooded coastline of Southern Samar, they reached a small island known as “Monbon” which was bordering the mouth of what is now the Lawa-an river. It was just in time to see that a severe storm was brewing from the western horizon. They decided to move inland, hastening towards the coastal jungle in their immediate front, to seek shelter behind the trunk of a towering tree which was clearly visible from the sea. It was behind that great tree that the frantic family was divinely protected from the roaring fury of the storm and a dire calamity was happily averted. When the typhoon subsided the next day the couple noticed that another tree of the same height and stature was also growing on the opposite bank of the river, twin sister to that of the other side - both so majestic and impressive in appearance, such that the branches up above completely overshadowed the river in-between.

After a hasty and meager breakfast of hot porridge, the small family looked askance of their surroundings and was deeply impressed by their new environment. The jungle growth even along the seashore bespoke fertility of the soil; the abundance of rattan and “hagnaya” vines was easy source of income and the shallow sea beside them was teeming with marine life of all kinds. All these offered suggestions that the place was ideal haven for habitation. So they abandoned their journey westward, instead, started building a makeshift hut at the foot of the same Lawa-an tree where they took refuge, at the same time, collecting whatever few belongings they could salvage from the wreckage of their boat. The days and weeks that followed were a series of trips inland by Juan Guingot - to cut rattan and hagnaya vines hereabouts or, perchance, he might find some edible fruits or root-crops nearby. Still further, he found unmistakable signs that the area was infested with wild life. The presence of these predators posed quite a problem to his intended plan of growing a vegetable farm; nevertheless, Guingot presently started his clearing (caingin) and the making of traps to capture some wild hogs or monkeys for food.

As was predictable in situations like this, Guingot reconstructed his sailboat, loaded it with rattan and hagnaya vines and sailed back to Guiuan where he sold his cargoes, telling the people and his friends along the way how he, with his family, was overtaken by a dreadful storm and escaped disaster behind the trunk of a giant Lawa-an tree. He emphasized to them the bright prospect of settling in the area partly as a token of gratitude and reverence to that haven of refuge - the enormous trunks of the twin Lawa-an trees; but most importantly, that the surrounding area was abundant and ideal for habitation. “Mamatay lak О-toy”, Juan Guingot would excitedly employ the slang and flavor of the Guiuan vernacular, “mamatay lak, dadi okoy ha Lawa-an (naming the place Lawa-an for the first time), ayaw pag-alang. Di ka mawawara hit doro-ongan kay kita gud iton hita-as nga kahoy ha dagat.” (Boy, when I die, stay here in Lawa-an, don't hesitate. You will never get lost of the loading dock because the tall trees can be seen from the sea.) Indeed, there was no other point of reference more appealing to the settlers this outstanding landmark conspicuous from the sea.

That was how the present town of Lawa-an at first received its name. Ironically, five wide centuries have come and gone; people have lived and died along with generations in accordance with the short span of human life, but the name “LAWA-AN”, a former barrio of Balangiga, province of Eastern Samar, has remained, to this day, unchanged.

== Geography ==
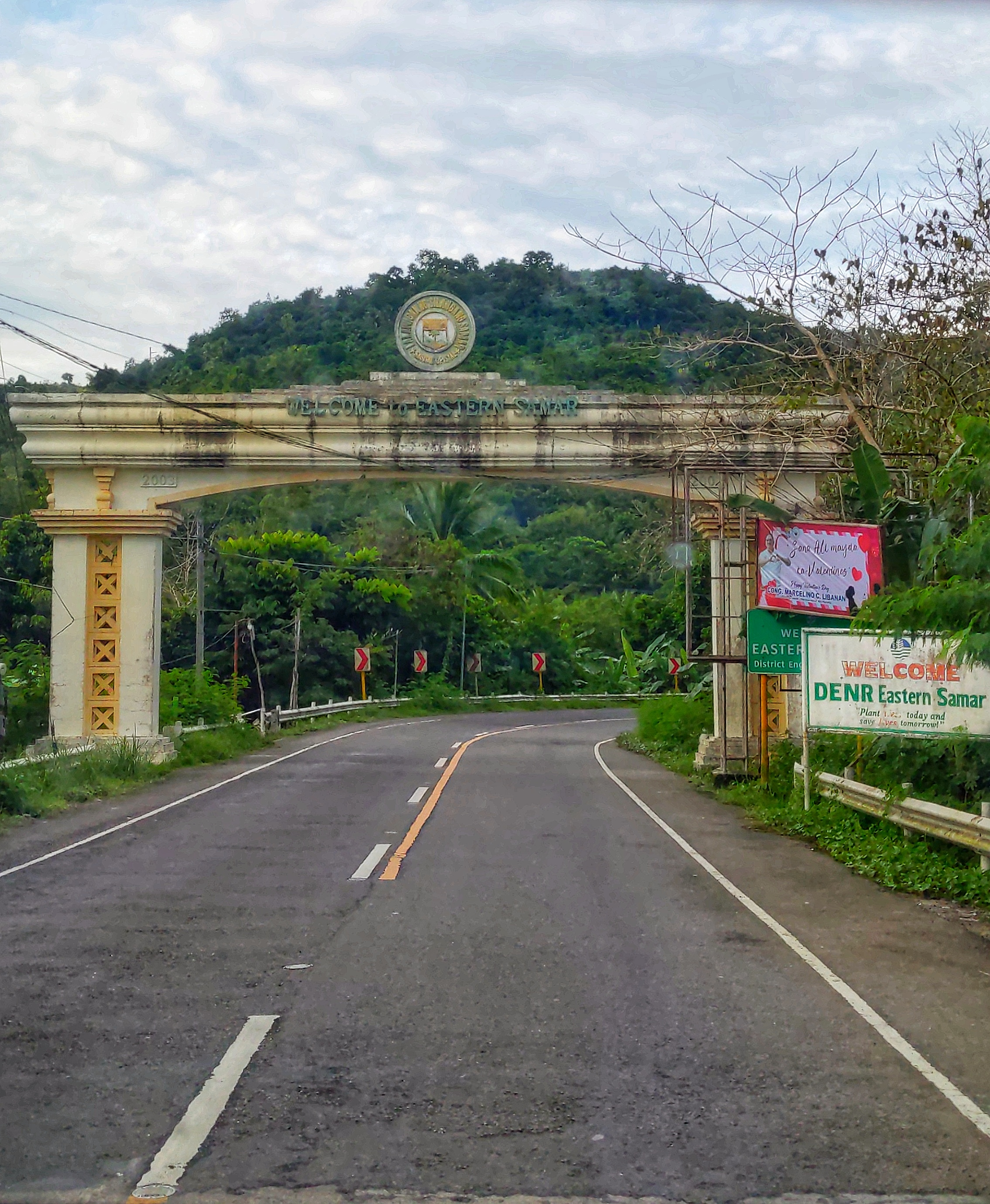
Eastern Samar Arch in Barangay Bolusao

The town is strategically located in the central part of southern Samar Island. It is sandwiched between the town of Balangiga in the east and Marabut, Samar in the west. Barangay Bolusao, the town's largest settlement located right at the east–west Samar boundary, serves as the premier barangay of Eastern Samar for those people coming from Tacloban City or Province of Samar traversing Samar Circumferencial Road. Hence, being dubbed as 'The Gateway to Eastern Samar'.

=== Barangays ===
Lawaan is politically subdivided into 16 barangays.

- Betaog
- Bolusao (largest by population and area)
- Guinob-an
- Maslog
- Barangay Poblacion 1
- Barangay Poblacion 2
- Barangay Poblacion 3
- Barangay Poblacion 4
- Barangay Poblacion 5
- Barangay Poblacion 6
- Barangay Poblacion 7
- Barangay Poblacion 8
- Barangay Poblacion 9
- Barangay Poblacion 10
- San Isidro
- Taguite

=== Climate ===
Climate data for Lawaan, Eastern Samar
Month	Jan	Feb	Mar	Apr	May	Jun	Jul	Aug	Sep	Oct	Nov	Dec	Year
Mean daily maximum °C (°F)	28 (82)	29 (84)	29 (84)	30 (86)	30 (86)	30 (86)	29 (84)	29 (84)	29 (84)	29 (84)	29 (84)	29 (84)	29 (84)
Mean daily minimum °C (°F)	22 (72)	22 (72)	22 (72)	23 (73)	25 (77)	25 (77)	25 (77)	25 (77)	25 (77)	24 (75)	24 (75)	23 (73)	24 (75)
Average precipitation mm (inches)	78 (3.1)	57 (2.2)	84 (3.3)	79 (3.1)	118 (4.6)	181 (7.1)	178 (7.0)	169 (6.7)	172 (6.8)	180 (7.1)	174 (6.9)	128 (5.0)	1,598 (62.9)
Average rainy days	16.7	13.8	17.3	18.5	23.2	26.5	27.1	26.0	26.4	27.5	24.6	21.0	268.6
Source: Meteoblue

== Demographics ==
Population census of Lawaan

Year	Pop.	±% p.a.
1960	5,983	—
1970	7,479	+2.25%
1975	8,517	+2.64%
1980	7,275	−3.10%
1990	7,792	+0.69%
1995	9,725	+4.24%

Year	Pop.	±% p.a.
2000	9,855	+0.29%
2007	10,645	+1.07%
2010	11,612	+3.21%
2015	12,742	+1.78%
2020	13,003	+0.43%
2024	13,063	+0.11%

Source: Philippine Statistics Authority

The population of Lawaan in the 2024 census was 13,063 people, with a density of 80 inhabitants per square kilometre or 210 inhabitants per square mile.

== Economy ==
Poverty incidence of Lawaan (%)

Source: Philippine Statistics Authority

Lawaan's main product is copra. Many families rely on coastal and deep-sea fishing as well as lowland and upland farming as means of livelihood. Others have spouses, children, parents or other relatives working in Tacloban City, Metro Manila or in other places within the Philippines or abroad either as professionals, contract workers or domestic helpers who regularly remit part of their earnings to their families back home. The single biggest employer of its local populace is the government.

== Tourism ==
Lawaan is known for its waterfalls and wildlife. Being a coastal town, it overlooks Leyte Gulf in its southern shores.

There are four waterfalls in the Bolusao watershed which lies within the SINP Buffer Zone. These falls are Amandaraga, Pange, Amanjuray, and Ban-Awan Falls. Amandaraga and Ban-awan Falls are the main source of the municipality's water system. Meanwhile, Amanjuray Falls is the alternate hydro-electric power source of Lawaan wherein a mini-hydro power plant is existent nearby.

== Notable personalities ==
- Freddie Abuda - retired professional basketball player, currently serving as an assistant coach to the San Beda Red Lions (NCAA).
