= Bolusao Watershed Forest Reserve =

- Bolusao Watershed
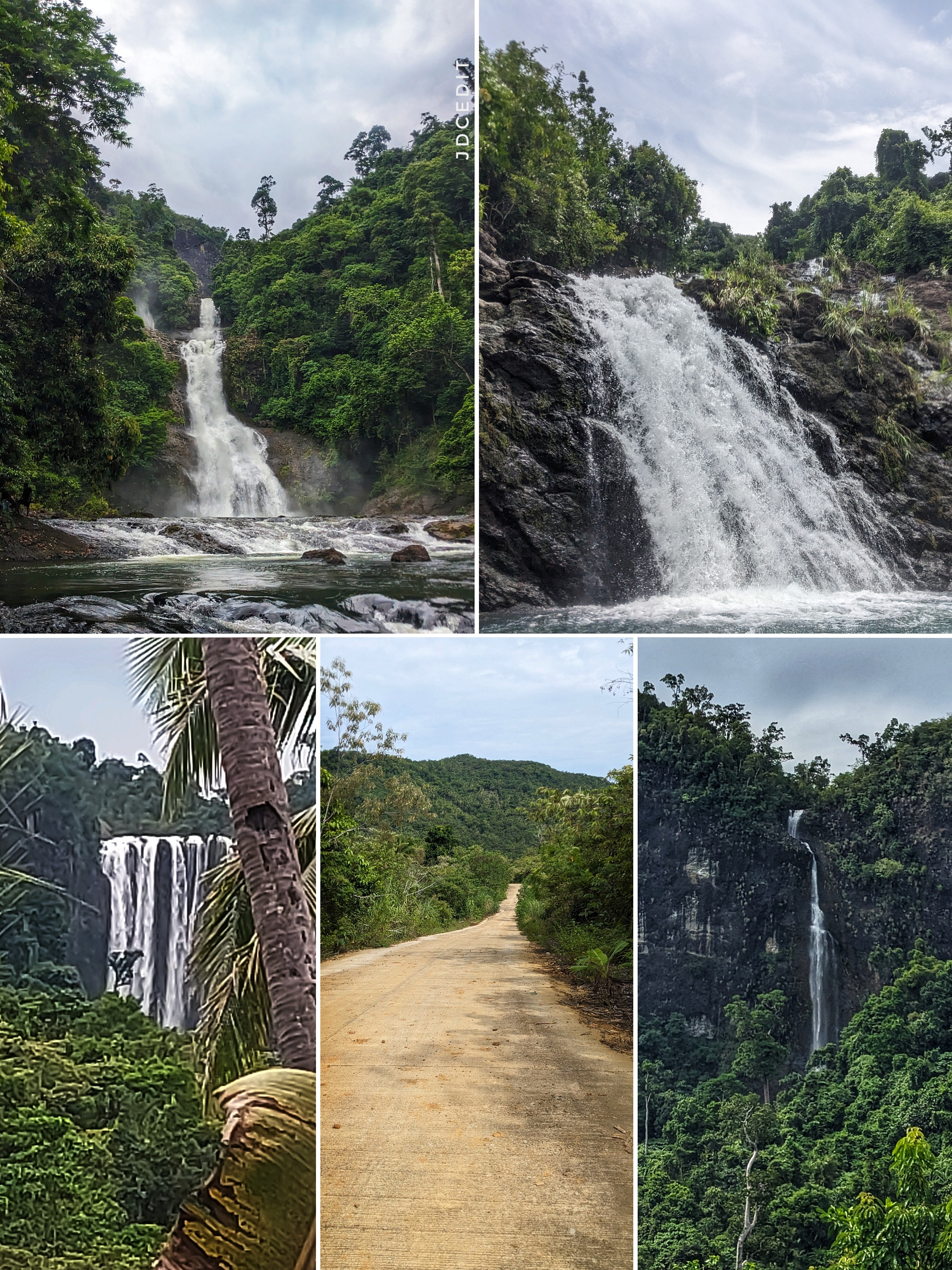
- Clockwise, from left to right: Amandaraga Falls, Pangi Falls, Amanjuray Falls, Upland Bolusao Tourism Road, Ban-awan Falls

- Location within Visayas Location within Philippines
- Location: Barangay Bolusao, Lawaan, Eastern Samar and nearby towns
- Nearest city: Tacloban
- Coordinates: 11°16′N 125°20′E
- Area: 4,055 hectares (10,020 acres)
- Established: December 1992
- Visitors: Negligible
- Governing body: Department of Environment and Natural Resources

Bolusao Watershed Forest Reserve is a reserve and ecotourism site in Barangay Bolusao, Lawaan, Eastern Samar, Philippines. Designated mainly to preserve and maintain the usefulness of the Bolusao River as a source of water for domestic use and irrigation in the area, it is now being revitalized as a sustainable energy source through Amanjuray falls' energy-generating Bolusao mini-hydro power plant, providing power to the residents of Lawaan and Balangiga in Eastern Samar.

== Geography ==
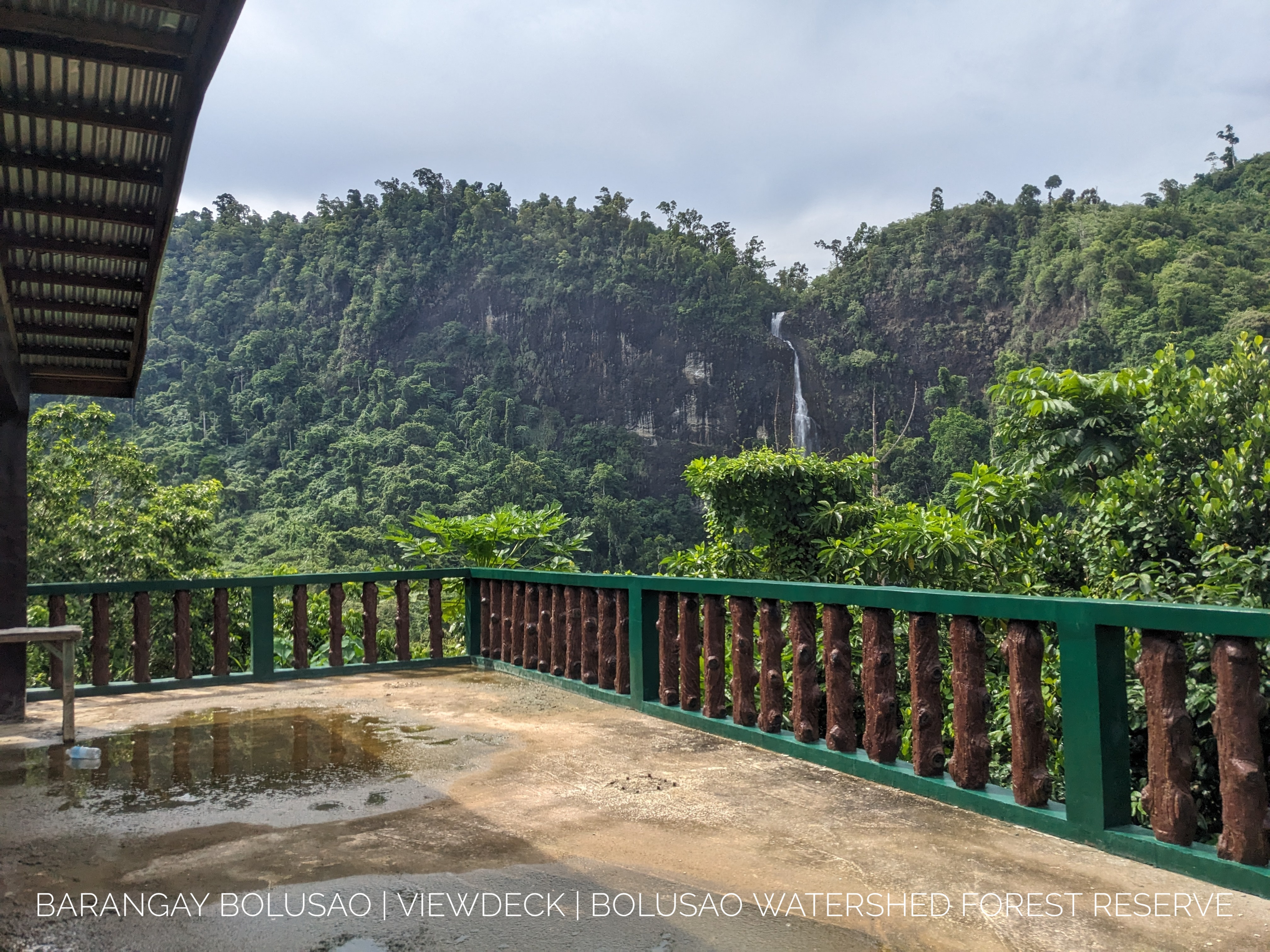
Amanjuray Falls as viewed from Barangay Bolusao View Deck

The Bolusao Watershed Forest Reserve is situated in the southern part of the island of Samar and lies within the coordinates 11°22'N and 125°20'E. Having an area of 4,055 hectares, it was declared as a watershed forest reserve via Proclamation Number 106 on 10 December 1992, for inclusion in the National Integrated Protected Areas System (NIPAS) by virtue of R.A. 7586 (DENR, 2003). It is under the administrative jurisdiction of the municipality of Lawaan, Eastern Samar.

=== Barangay Bolusao ===
Bolusao is the most populated barangay in Lawaan, Eastern Samar, Philippines. It is centrally located right at the east-west Samar boundary. It serves as the premier barangay of Eastern Samar for people coming from Tacloban City or Province of Samar traversing Samar Circumferencial Road. Hence, dubbed as 'The Gateway to Eastern Samar'.

Its population as determined by the 2015 Census was 1,626. This represented 12.76% of the total population of Lawaan.

=== Infrastructure ===
Bolusao Watershed has experienced a range of infrastructure advancements in recent years. The construction of new roads and bridges has been arranged to improve connectivity and access to remote areas. Moreover, efforts have been made to bolster agricultural infrastructure, supporting local farmers and increasing productivity.

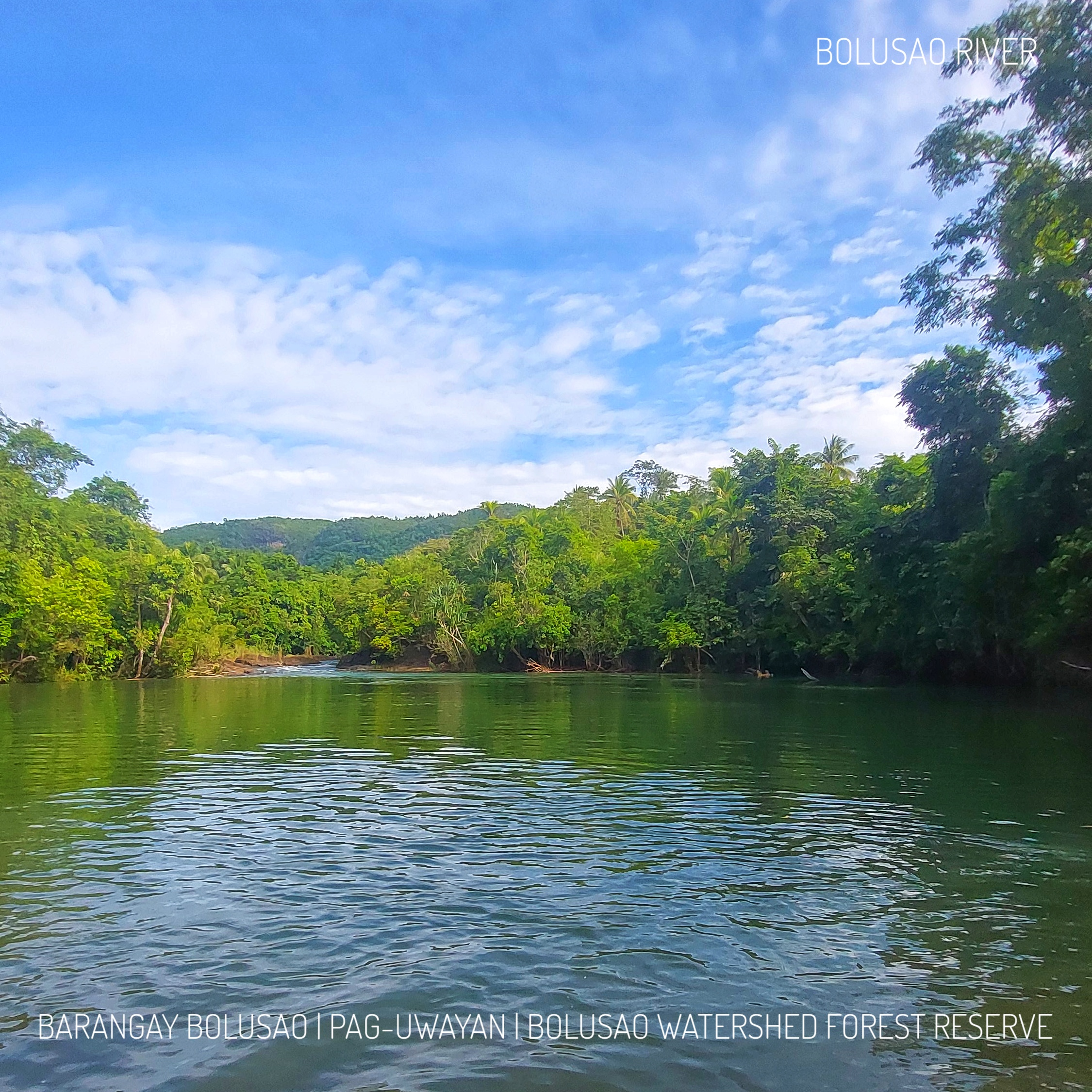
Bolusao River in the vicinity of Pag-uwayan and Kanyango-on areas, where coconut farms and various crops are grown

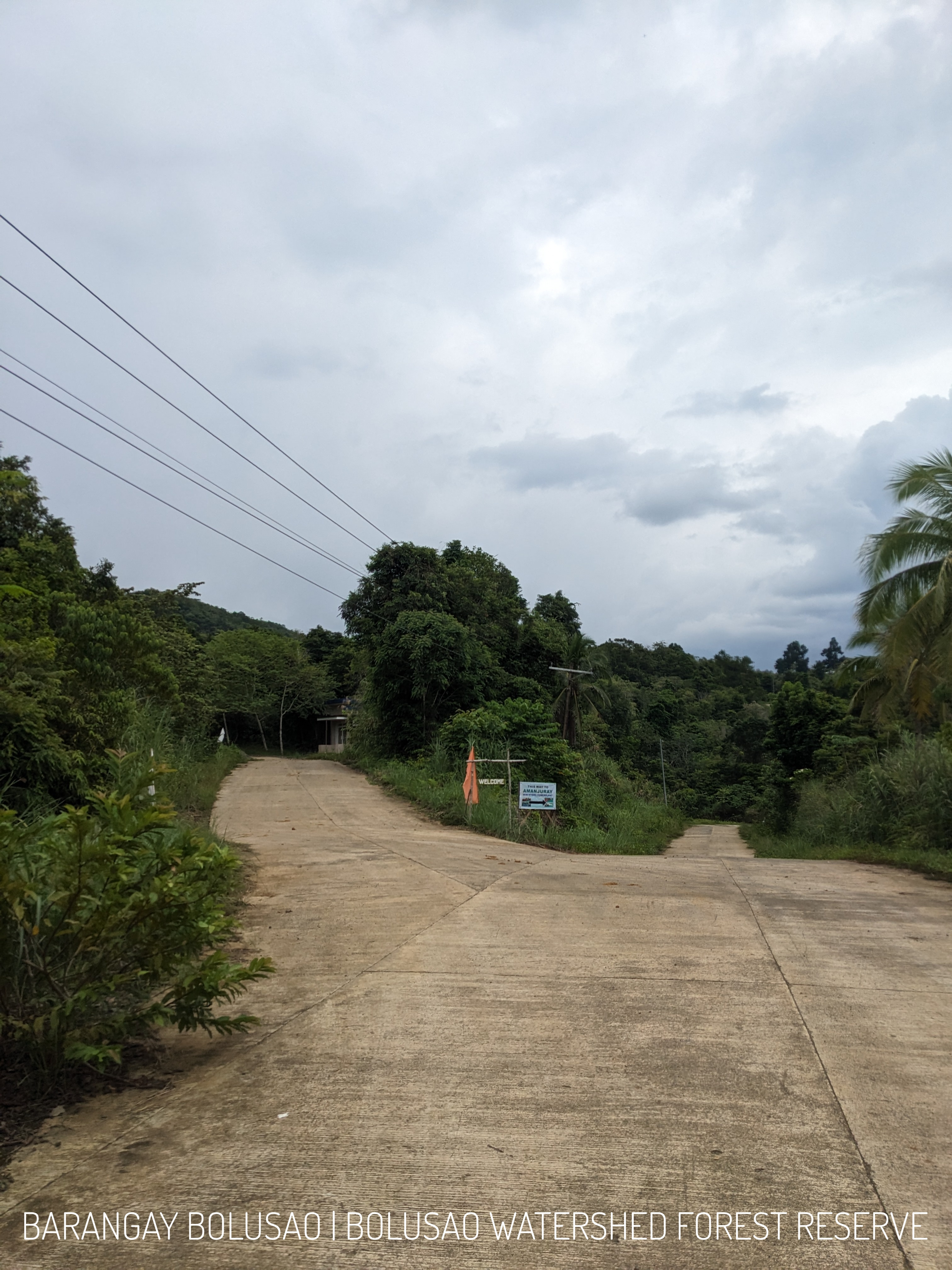
Access Road Leading to the Water falls complex and Bolusao Amanjuray Hydro-electric power

Bolusao Irrigation-DD (Diversion Dams)

Bolusao-Tabuk Farm to Market Road

Rehabilitation and Conservation Management Planning for Bolusao Watershed Forest Reserve and Coastal and Marine Protected Areas in Lawaan - UNDP-SGP

Bolusao Amanjuray Hydroelectric Power

Barangay Bolusao-Sitio Sungduan Road

== Biodiversity ==
The Philippine tarsier is known to be one of the smallest primates, categorized as an endangered species in the area. This nocturnal animal has been sighted at the Bolusao watershed and adjacent San Isidro village. The avifauna of the Bulosao River Watershed Forest Reserve is virtually unknown, but it is likely to be similar to those of the other IBAs on Samar, the Mt Cabalantian-Mt Capotoan complex and the Mt Yacgun-Mt Sohoton complex. The extensive forests in this IBA therefore probably support important populations of several of the threatened and restricted-range species of the Mindanao and Eastern Visayas Endemic Bird Area.

== Tourism ==
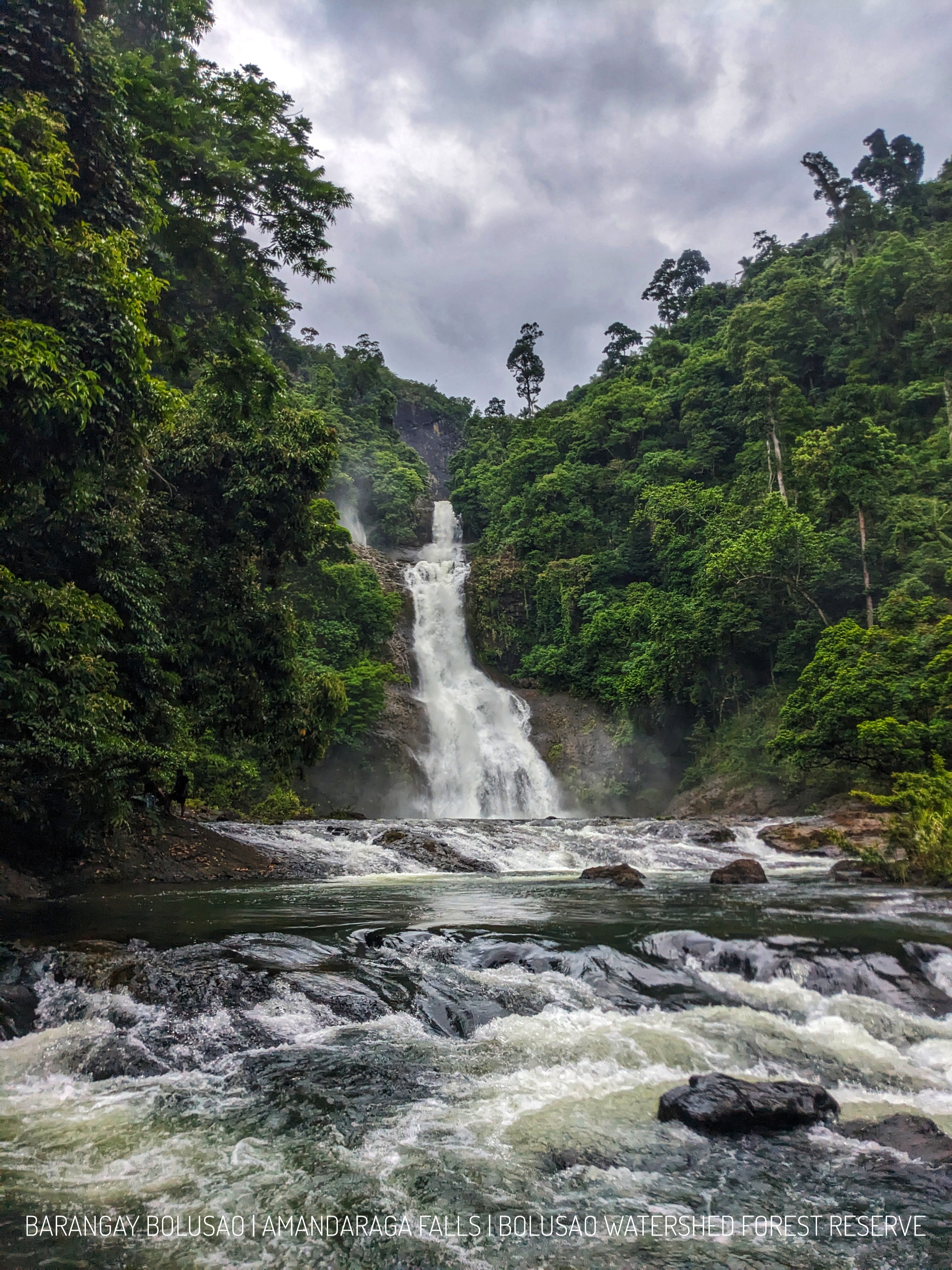
Amandaraga Falls as viewed from the Bolusao River basin

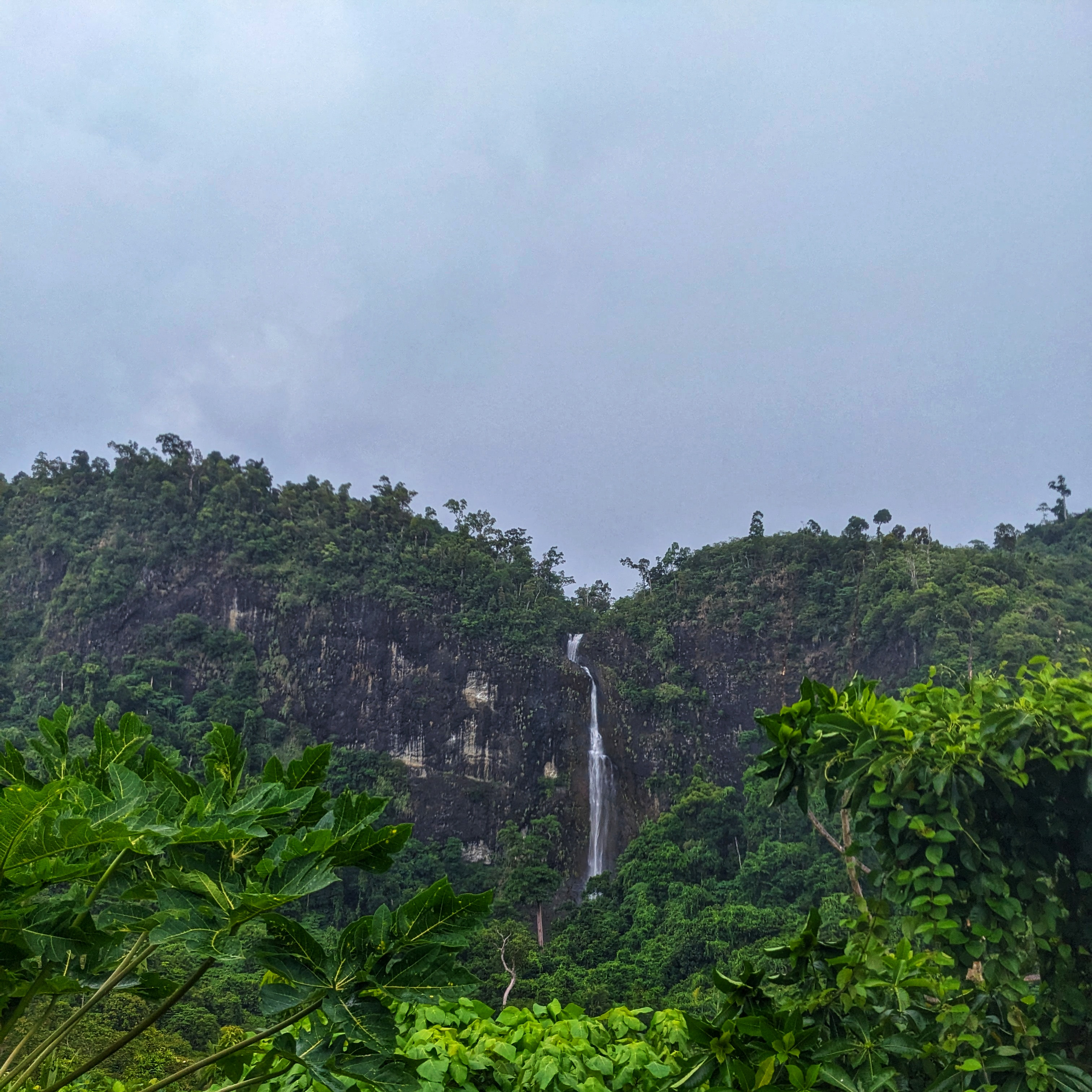
Amanjuray Falls, a hydro power source

There are four waterfalls in the Bolusao watershed which lies within the Samar Island Buffer Zone. These falls are Amandaraga, Pangi, Amanjuray, and Ban-Awan Falls located in Barangay Bolusao. Amandaraga and Ban-awan Falls are the main source of the municipality's water system. Meanwhile, Amanjuray Falls is the alternate hydro-electric power source of Lawaan wherein a mini-hydro power plant is existent nearby.
