= USS LST-990 =

1944 LST-542-class tank landing ship

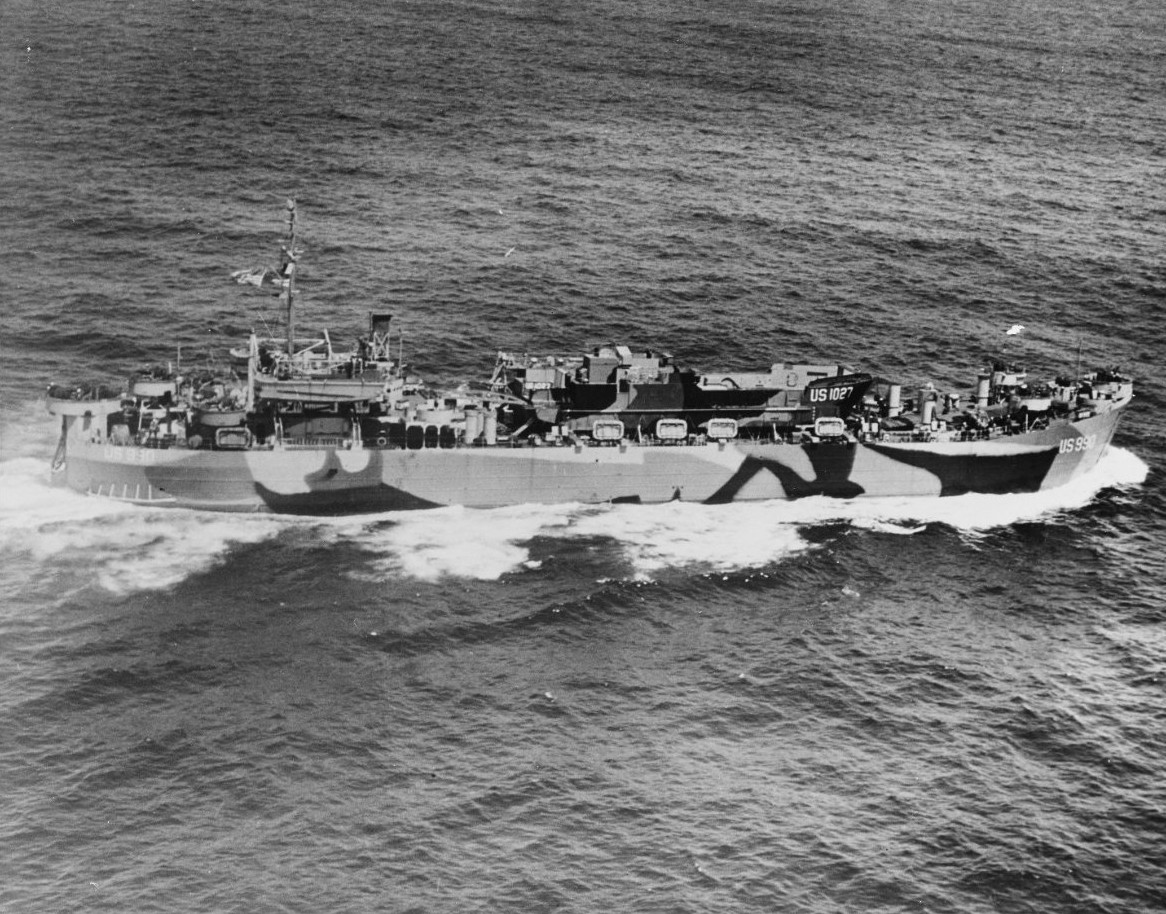
- LST-990 underway in January-February 1945, with LCT-1027 on deck

History

United States
- Name: USS LST-990
- Builder: Boston Navy Yard
- Laid down: 26 February 1944
- Launched: 27 March 1944
- Commissioned: 1 May 1944
- Decommissioned: 10 July 1946
- Stricken: 25 September 1946
- Honours and awards: 4 battle stars (World War II)
- Fate: Sold, 26 September 1947

General characteristics
- Class & type: LST-542-class tank landing ship
- Displacement: 1,490 long tons (1,514 t) light; 4,080 long tons (4,145 t) full
- Length: 328 ft (100 m)
- Beam: 50 ft (15 m)
- Draft: 8 ft (2.4 m) forward; 14 ft 4 in (4.37 m) aft
- Propulsion: 2 × General Motors 12-567 diesel engines, two shafts
- Speed: 10.8 knots (20.0 km/h; 12.4 mph)
- Complement: 7 officers, 104 enlisted men
- Armament: 6 × 40 mm guns; 6 × 20 mm guns

USS LST-990 was an LST-542-class tank landing ship in the United States Navy. Like many of her class, she was not named and is properly referred to by her hull designation.

LST-990 was laid down on 26 February 1944 at the Boston Navy Yard; launched on 27 March 1944; and commissioned on 1 May 1944.

== Service history ==
During World War II, LST-990 was assigned to the Asiatic-Pacific theater and participated in the following operations; capture and occupation of southern Palau Islands (September and October 1944), Leyte landings (October and November 1944), Zambales-Subic Bay (January 1945), assault and occupation of Okinawa Gunto (March through June 1945).

Following the war, LST-990 performed occupation duty in the Far East until early December 1945. She returned to the United States and was decommissioned on 10 July 1946 and struck from the Navy list on 25 September that same year. On 26 September 1947, the ship was sold to the Boston Metals Co., of Baltimore, Maryland, for scrapping.

LST-990 earned four battle stars for World War II service.
