= Guiuan Protected Landscape and Seascape =

Protected area in the Philippines

- Guiuan Marine Reserve
- IUCN category V (protected landscape/seascape)
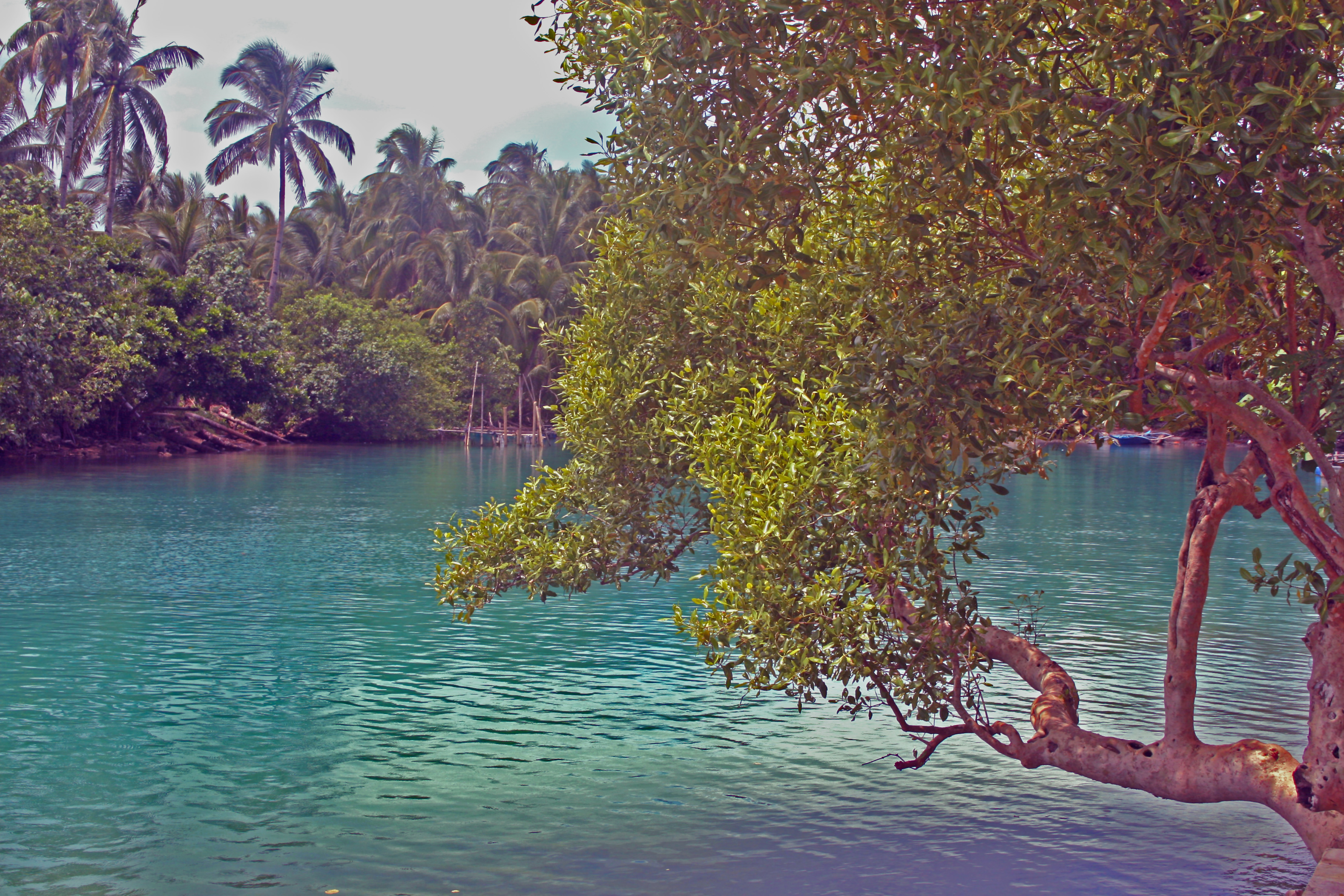
- A small lagoon on Tubabao island

- Location within Philippines
- Location: Eastern Samar, Philippines
- Nearest city: Borongan
- Coordinates: 10°59′52″N 125°43′43″E
- Area: 33,492 hectares (82,760 acres)
- Established: November 10, 1978 (Marine reserve); September 26, 1994 (Protected landscape and seascape)
- Governing body: Department of Environment and Natural Resources

The Guiuan Protected Landscape and Seascape, also known as the Guiuan Marine Reserve, is a protected area associated with the Guiuan Island Group which is located off the coast of the municipality of Guiuan on the eastern side of Leyte Gulf in the Philippines. The protected area consists of the following islands from within the group: Calicoan, Manicani, Suluan, Tubabao, Victory, Homonhon and other smaller islands and their surrounding reefs. It also includes the coastal area of mainland Guiuan in Eastern Samar covering a total area of 60,448 hectares (149,370 acres). The land which now comprises the conservation area was previously declared as a Marine Reserve and Tourist Zone and was placed under the administration and control of the Philippine Tourism Authority in 1978. It was re-proclaimed and re-classified as a protected landscape/seascape in 1994 under the National Integrated Protected Areas System Act of 1992.

== Geography ==
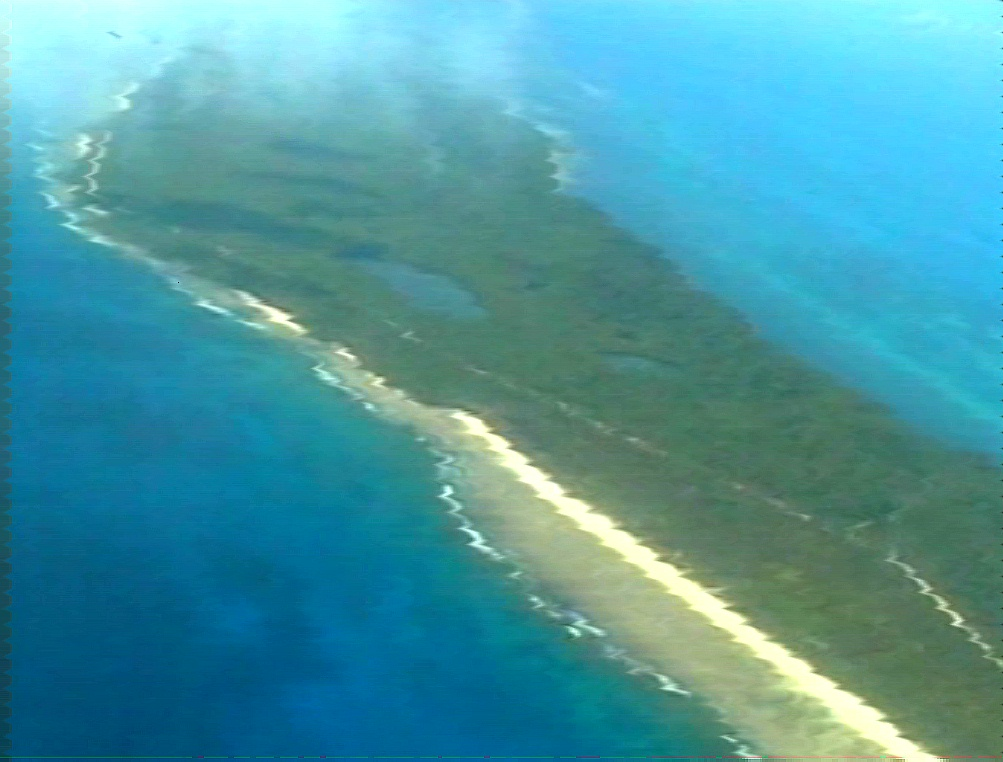
An aerial view of Calicoan Island

The Guiuan Marine Reserve extends along the western and southern coast of Guiuan Peninsula, the southernmost tip of Samar, located between Leyte Gulf and the Philippine Sea. It contains numerous islands and islets, such as the chain of Calicoan, Leleboon (Sulangan) and Candolu which form a prolongation of the peninsula. These islands are separated only by narrow shoals and appear to be part of the Guiuan peninsula from a distance. A prominent feature of the islands is the 400-foot (120 m) coral ridge covered in bushes and shrubs that runs from Guiuan to the southern tip of Candolu in Songi Point. Their shoreline is made up of white sand beaches and coral bluffs, with the side facing the Pacific Ocean containing surf beaches particularly in Calicoan. The 1,600-hectare (4,000-acre) Calicoan island, known as the "Surf Capital of the Visayas", also has six lagoons, several caves and lush forest.

15 kilometres (9.3 mi) southwest of Candolu is Homonhon where Ferdinand Magellan first set foot in the Philippines in 1521. It is a crescent-shaped island covered with coconut trees that forms the northern border of the Surigao Strait. It is sparsely populated and has a small islet on its western side called Montoconon. Further to the east is Suluan island where a cylindrical concrete lighthouse stands. The more populated islands of the Guiuan Group are on the side of Guiuan Bay facing Leyte Gulf, an area of coral reefs and extensive mangrove forests. They include Manicani which contains 4 villages, and Tubabao, where a Russian refugee settlement was established in 1949.

== Biodiversity ==
The Guiuan protected area is composed of coastal, marine and freshwater ecosystems. The dominant vegetation is mangrove (Scyphiphora acidula/nilad and Diospyros ferrea/bantolinao) which lines the coast of mainland Guiuan and covers most of the islands. Terrestrial species of hardwood trees have also been observed in the larger islands such as Shorea astylosa (yakal), Xanthostemon verdugonianus (mancono), Vitex quinata (colipapa), and Tristaniopsis decorticata (tiga). Seagrass beds are common and extensive in the protected area, with the most common seagrass species being Cymodocea rotundata, Enhalus acoroides, Thalassia hemprichii, and Syringodium isoetifolium. Coral diversity is highest at Suluan island where 25 species hard and soft corals are found. They serve as habitats for many colonies of fish, such as barracuda, marlin and scombrid, and other marine species like marine turtles, octopus, squid and seacucumber.

The Department of Environment and Natural Resources also documented the following wildlife species in the area in 2008: the Philippine tarsier and Philippine long-tailed macaque, and bird species such as the Philippine cockatoo, herons, migratory egrets, bitterns, plovers, sandpipers, gulls and terns. Several reptiles were also sighted in the area, including monitor lizards and sailfin lizards.
