= Victory Island =

Island in the Philippines

- Location within Visayas

Geography
- Coordinates: 11°2′47″N 125°37′4″E
- Archipelago: Philippine
- Adjacent to: Leyte Gulf
- Area: 0.03 km^{2} (0.012 sq mi)

Administration
- Philippines
- Region: Eastern Visayas
- Province: Eastern Samar
- Municipality: Guiuan
- Barangay: Victory Island

Demographics
- Population: 598 (2020)
- Pop. density: 19,933/km^{2} (51626/sq mi)
- Ethnic groups: Waray

Victory Island is a small island off the coast of Samar, Philippines, situated in Leyte Gulf. It is locally administered by the barangay with the same name and is controlled by the municipality of Guiuan, Eastern Samar. According to the 2020 census, Victory Island has an estimated population of 598.

The island is home to a small catholic church and an elementary school.

Due to its proximity to the Pacific Ocean, Victory Island is exposed and vulnerable to typhoons. On November 8, 2013, Typhoon Haiyan made landfall in Guiuan, devastating the island and destroying houses and fishing boats, uprooting trees, killing at least one person and leaving fifteen people missing.

The island is situated 5.3 km (3.3 mi) to the west of Tubabao Island and 4.4 km (2.8 mi) north of Manicani Island.

== See also ==
- List of islands by population density
