= Head of the Virgin =

17th-century ivory sculpture from the Philippines

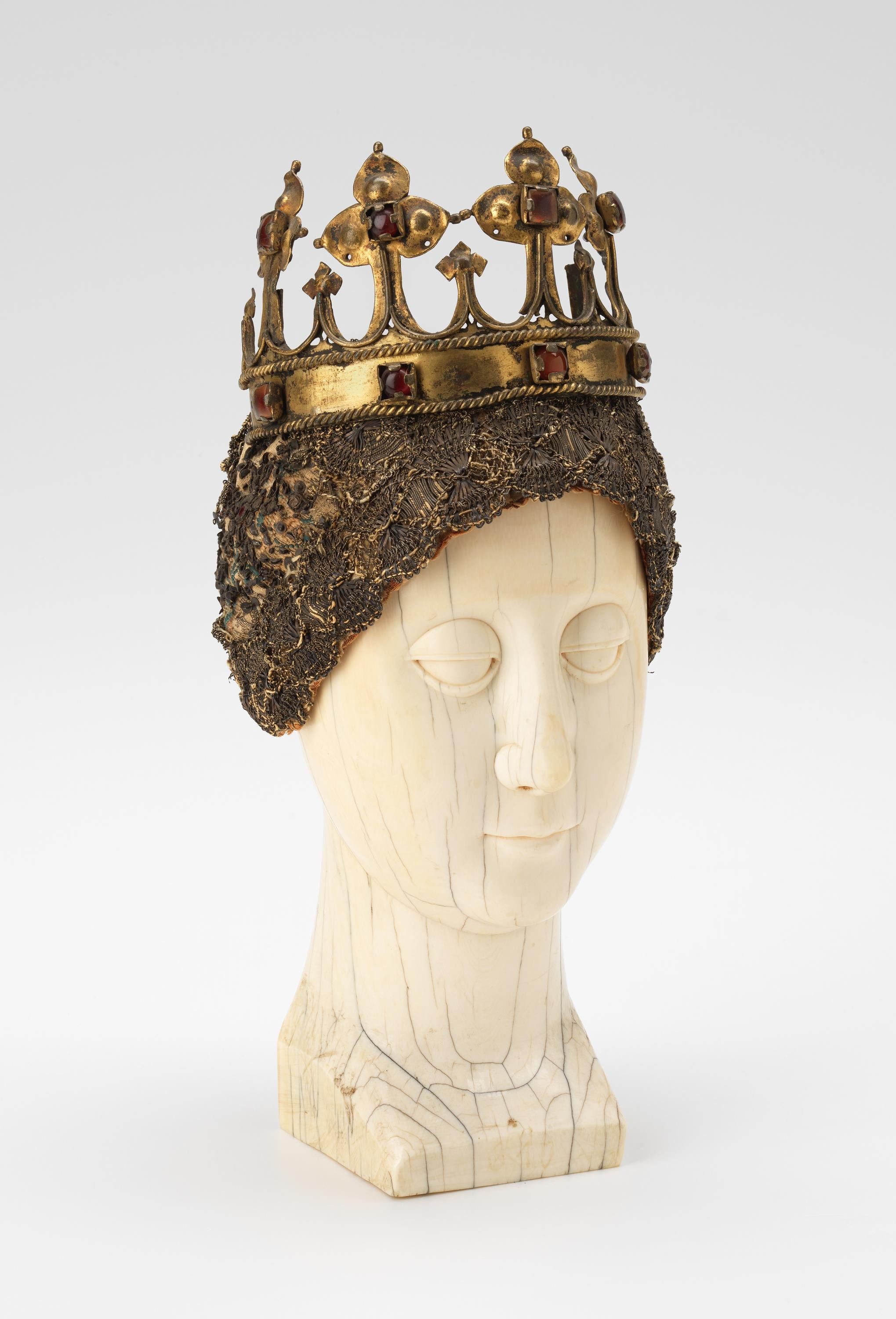
- Artist: Unknown
- Year: 17th century
- Medium: ivory, metal, silk, paste, metal lace
- Dimensions: 271 mm × 120 mm (10.67 in × 4.72 in)
- Location: National Gallery of Victoria, Melbourne, Australia
- Website: https://connectingcollections-manmel.com/head-of-the-virgin-ivory/

The Head of the Virgin is a 17th-century carved ivory head of the Virgin Mary now in the National Gallery of Victoria, Melbourne, Australia. Such heads would usually have been connected to a wooden armature making up a devotional statue in the Catholic faith as part of the tradition of the imagen de vestir of clothed statues. The head is from the Philippines where the Catholic faith was introduced in the early 15th century and rapidly grew in popularity. Much carved ivory entered a global market through the Manila Galleon trade, based on Manila, Philippines. Catholic subjects included, but were not limited to: the Virgin Mary, Christ, the Archangel Michael, and various saints. Other types were ivory hands that were to be attached to clothed statues. The trade was part of a larger Spanish colonial effort to establish a global economy tied to the Manila Galleon Trade route which linked Southeast Asia, China and the Philippines to territorial, colonial, and Vice-regal Spain.

== Description ==
The Head of the Virgin is 271 x 120 x 120 mm (overall), it is made of carved ivory as the main structural piece, metal for the crown, and silk and metal lace that adorn the head. The head rests on a squared base. The slope on the neck starts uniform along the front edge. Along the sides the taper in from the edge starts slightly higher going from front to back. The front taper looks like it begins roughly 11 mm from the bottom. The side taper starts at the same point in the front portion and gradually starts higher reaching a plateau at ~34 mm towards the back. The base of the neck has a fairly uniform cylindrical shape ~48 mm from the bottom. There is a slight taper in the neck as it goes up the piece. The chin of the head begins ~68 mm from the bottom. The chin extends towards the jawline seamlessly creating an oval shape. The jawline extends to the back of the head that is ~102 mm from the base. Slightly higher the chin rounds subtly into the base of the lips. The lips are subtle in merging from the outer lip to the formal lip shape. The mouth looks like it is slightly smiling with a crisp carved line in the center of the mouth. The mouth has a slightly pronounced tuberculum, thin upper lip and rounded soft-edged bottom lip. The edges of the mouth span ~28 mm equilaterally from center. The philantrum is soft and almost unnoticeable.

The nose is centered and protruding from the face straight out. The nostrils are slightly flared creating a pronounced back edge closer to the face, roughly the same size in diameter as the tip of the nose. The nostrils are oval in shape and are facing mostly downward with a slight tilt up. The shaft of the nose extends up to the brow bone with a slight taper in towards the face reaching the bridge of the nose and taper back out until the brow bone. The brow bone extends across the base of the forehead, ~147 mm from the base, until the outside of the eyes which sit set into the face seemingly gazing down. The eyes are almond shaped with a near point on the outside of the eye. The upper eyelid has a very pronounced edge at the top of the eyelid which is half closed on either eye. There is a carved line at the edge of the upper eyelid going across the eyelid horizontally. The lower eyelid follows closely the edge of the bottom of the almond shape creating a thin, elongated 'U' shape.

Above the carved ivory head is a headdress of silk and metal lace. The headdress is rounded around the figures head resembling the outlining of a hairline being lowest at the sides of the head, ~124 mm from the base, and highest at the forehead, ~176 mm from the base. The metal lace is the top most layer of the headdress detailing intricate interwoven metal chains varying in sizes and lengths. On the headdress there also appears to be jewels of various colors woven into the headdress where there is less metal lace exposing more of the silk underneath. The colors of the metal lace range from brown and dull matte to a shiny bronze color that seems semi-polished.

On top of the metal lace headdress is a crown that is made of a single sheet of tarnished bronze colored metal decorated with an outlined brim of metal chords displaying two varying sized clovers with three almond shaped punch outs displayed at the foot of the clovers. The brim is also adorned with red jewels encased in a squared clasp that is ~10mm x 10mm. The clovers of larger stature, ~56 mm tall, are decorated with red jewels encased in a squared metal clasp. The larger clovers also have a convex dimpled burnish on each of the three clovers. At the tips of each of these clovers is a metal ball. The lateral leaflets of the clovers are a single punched hole. The smaller clovers, ~22 mm tall have a single burnished convex dimple at the center of the three leaflets. There are also several conjoining metal wires that are laid on top of the clovers the travel from one clover to the next bridging the spaces between the clovers adjacent and ascending up the stalk of the next clover.

== Adornment of Ivories ==
The adornment of ivories in the context of the Head of the Virgin is part of a larger tradition called imagen de vestir or images "de vestidos". Ivories of this nature were attached to and part of a larger structure that had articulated limbs which were made of wood called a "roca". These figures were clothed with extravagant gowns and jewelry as a way of to show devotion and reverence. The dress and adornment of the ivories and ivory structures has a second significance primarily that of the perceived thaumaturgic role of the statues' cloths and jewels. A source attesting the miraculous nature of and around the figures' clothing and adornments can be found in the Santuario Mariano, e Historia das Imagens milagrosas de Nosa Senhora, e das milagrosamente apparecidas translated to Marian Sanctuary, and history of the miraculous Images of Our Lady, and the miraculously appeared.

== Catholicism in the Philippines ==
Catholicism in the Philippines has been very prominent in the country for over 300 years. Dating back to the Portuguese explorer Ferdinand Magellan, Christianity was introduced to the Philippines around 1480 - 1521. The Philippines are one of two Southeast Asian countries that has subscribed to the Christian faith; whom of a population of 104 million, 90% of Filippinos identify. The tradtition has its roots tied to Magellan when the Portuguese explorer's missionaries conducted mass on Homonhon Island; the same day up to 800 Bubanos were baptized.

== Manila Galleon Trade ==
The Head of the Virgin has its roots in the Manila Galleon trade, in which the connection between Southeast Asia, the Philippines; territorial, Colonial and Vice-regal Spain, and some parts of Europe culminating in the Global entrepót of Manila, Philippines. The Catholic influence which was brought by the Portuguese trader Magellan, is inextricably linked to the cultural Iconography of the Head of the Virgin, but was influenced by the Asian physiognomy that is linked to the Buddhist iconographic traditions, associated with its Chinese craftsman. The culmination of these aspects is due to a set of local conditions that undid a century long trade ban, a need for silver by the Ming government, and a cultural shift away from agriculture in China. The Manila Galleon trade which brought these influences together proogate an idea of mixed heritage for the Head of the Virgin which until recently was considered a Spanish production.
