= Sulangan Island =

Island in the Philippines

Geography
- Coordinates: 10.936944°N 125.827778°E
- Highest elevation: 6.2 m (20.3 ft)

Administration
- Philippines
- Region: Eastern Visayas
- Province: Eastern Samar
- Town: Guiuan

Demographics
- Population: 3,834

Sulangan Island is an island in Guiuan sandwiched between Calicoan Island and Candulo Island in the Philippines. Its population is 3,834.

== History ==
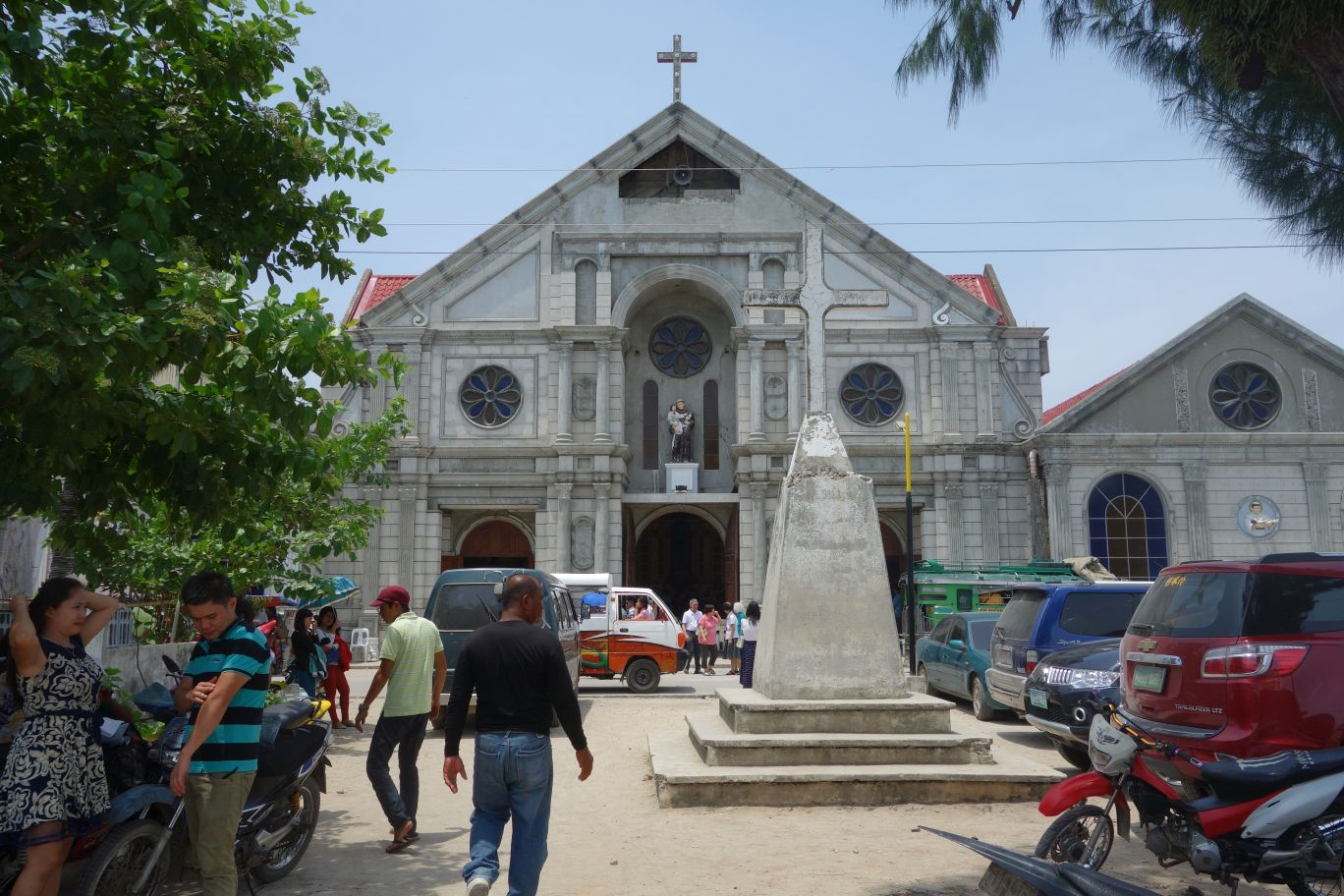
Sulangan Church

On August 3, 2021, A ship had engine failures near Sulangan Island. All of the crew were rescued and transported to a facility in nearby Barangay Cogon.

On April 19, 2023, another vessel ran aground on the island. The vessel was Chinese. The vessel consisted of 21 Chinese crew. After 2 weeks, It refloated.
