= Guiuan =

Municipality in Eastern Samar, Philippines

- Municipality
- Municipality of Guiuan
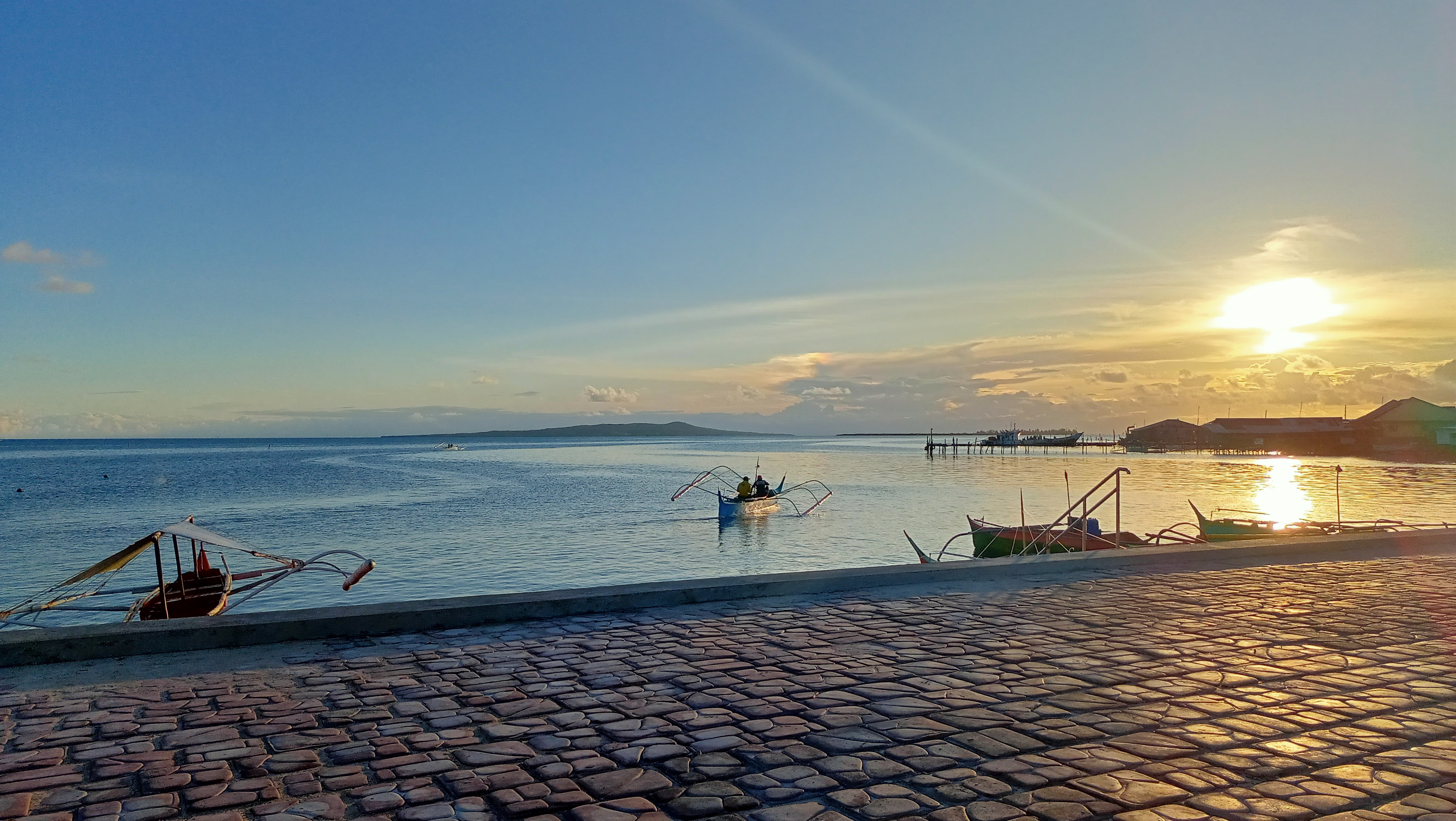
- Near-sunset view of Leyte Gulf and Manicani Island from the Guiuan Integrated Transport Terminal

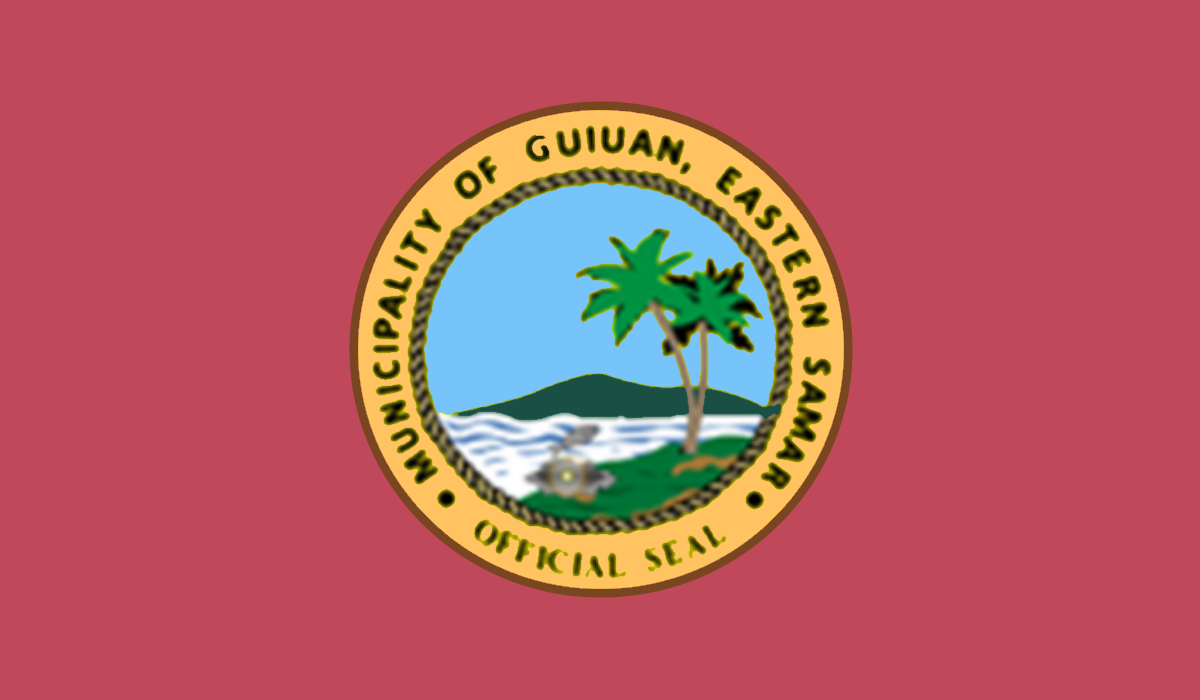
- Flag
- Nickname: Gateway to Modern Philippine History Surfing Capital of the Visayas
- Motto(s): Sulong pa, Guiuan! (Waray-waray for "Advance, Guiuan!"); Guiuan, Bungto ta, Higugma-a ta. (Waray-waray for "Let us Love our Town, Guiuan.")
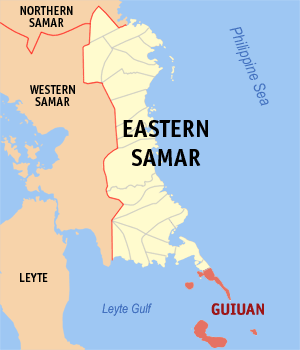
- Map of Eastern Samar with Guiuan highlighted

- Location within the Philippines
- Coordinates: 11°02′N 125°44′E
- Country: Philippines
- Region: Eastern Visayas
- Province: Eastern Samar
- District: Lone district
- Barangays: 60 (see Barangays)

Government
  - Type: Sangguniang Bayan
  - Mayor: Annaliza G. Kwan
  - Vice Mayor: Veronica C. Ramirez
  - Representative: Maria Fe R. Abunda
  - Councilors: List: • Floriano G. Bagro; • Rogelio O. Cablao; • Antonia R. Cablao; • Francis Aldous B. Sison; • Carlito S. Abrugar; • Jose Eric C. Cordero; • Manuel L. Velasco; • Pedro M. Macabocsit; DILG Masterlist of Officials
  - Electorate: 36,365 voters (2025)

Area
  - Total: 175.49 km^{2} (67.76 sq mi)
- Elevation: 8.0 m (26.2 ft)
- Highest elevation: 130 m (430 ft)
- Lowest elevation: 0 m (0 ft)

Population (2024 census)
  - Total: 52,749
  - Density: 300.58/km^{2} (778.50/sq mi)
  - Households: 13,293
- Demonym: Guiuananon

Economy
  - Income class: 1st municipal income class
  - Poverty incidence: 29.01% (2023)
  - Revenue: ₱ 372.8 million (2024)
  - Assets: ₱ 958.7 million (2024)
  - Expenditure: ₱ 274.9 million (2024)
  - Liabilities: ₱ 195.2 million (2024)

Service provider
  - Electricity: Eastern Samar Electric Cooperative (ESAMELCO)
- Time zone: UTC+8 (PST)
- ZIP code: 6809
- PSGC: 0802609000
- IDD : area code: +63 (0)55
- Native languages: Waray; Tagalog
- Website: www.guiuan.gov.ph

Guiuan ([ˈgiˌwan]; Waray: Bungto han Guiuan, Filipino: Bayan ng Guiuan), officially the Municipality of Guiuan, is a municipality in the province of Eastern Samar, Philippines. It constitutes the southeastern extremity of Samar Island and some adjacent islands, surrounded by Leyte Gulf and the Philippine Sea (which a marginal sea of the Pacific Ocean), two major bodies of water that makes the town the surfing capital of the Visayas. According to the 2024 census, it has a population of 52,749 people, making it the most populous municipality in Eastern Samar (followed by Dolores) and the second most populous administrative division in the entire province after the capital city Borongan.

Guiuan played a significant part in Philippine history. Historical accounts attested that Ferdinand Magellan's 16th century expedition first landed on the island of Homonhon, which lies within the municipality, after their Pacific crossing. The Immaculate Conception Parish Church in the Guiuan poblacion was established in the 18th century by Jesuits and is one of the oldest in the country.

During the Second World War, the islands of Suluan and Homonhon, both in Guiuan, became the American forces' first landing points, along with Dinagat Island, for the start of the Battle of Leyte Gulf. After the victory of Leyte Gulf operation, the entire town served as one of the naval bases for the Allies. In 1949, the Guiuan island of Tubabao hosted thousands of White Russian refugees fleeing from the wake of the Russian Revolution and Russian Civil War.

In November 2013, Guiuan was nearly levelled after Typhoon Haiyan, one of the deadliest and strongest tropical cyclones in the Philippines, made its first landfall in the town. Local and international aid helped Guiuan recover from the typhoon's catastrophic impact, and the town's economy has since flourished. Due to the COVID-19 pandemic, the town saw border restrictions and multiple lockdowns that affected the local economy and way of life.

As well as a rich historical background, Guiuan has many scenic spots. Being a coastal town on the Pacific side, the town has many white-sand beaches that are suitable for swimming and surfing. The Immaculate Conception Parish Church of Guiuan is currently in the tentative list for UNESCO World Heritage Sites under the Baroque Churches of the Philippines (Extension).

== History ==
Guiuan is widely known for two significant events in history 423 years apart. In 1521, Ferdinand Magellan, first European to set foot on Philippine soil, landed in Homonhon, now part of Guiuan. In 1944, the American Forces landed on the island of Suluan where they fought their first battle in the Philippine territory three days before Gen. Douglas MacArthur stormed the beaches of Leyte. The Americans built a military base for its torpedo boats, warships, bombers and fighter planes. The base was the biggest American supply base in the Pacific during the war. About 100,000 American servicemen were stationed in Guiuan and nearby towns.

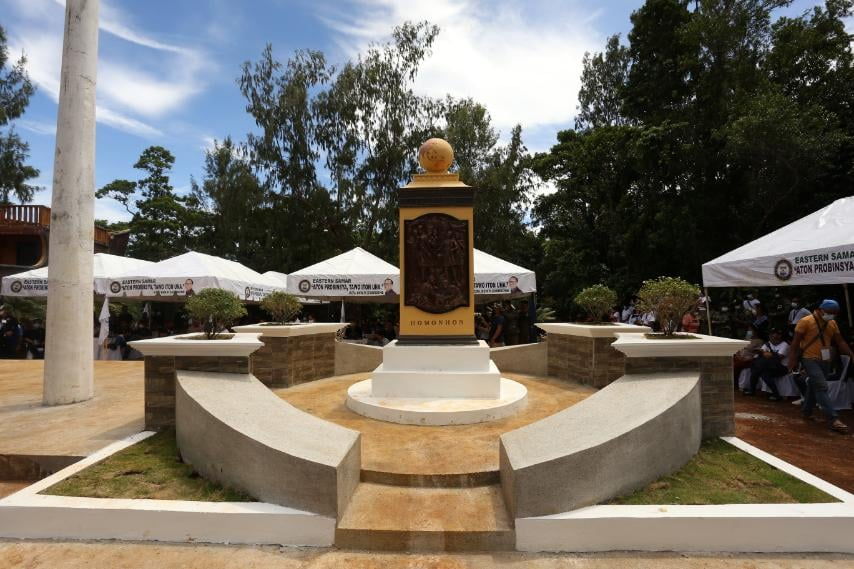
A historical marker in Homonhon Island marking the site where Ferdinand Magellan's expedition landed in 1521

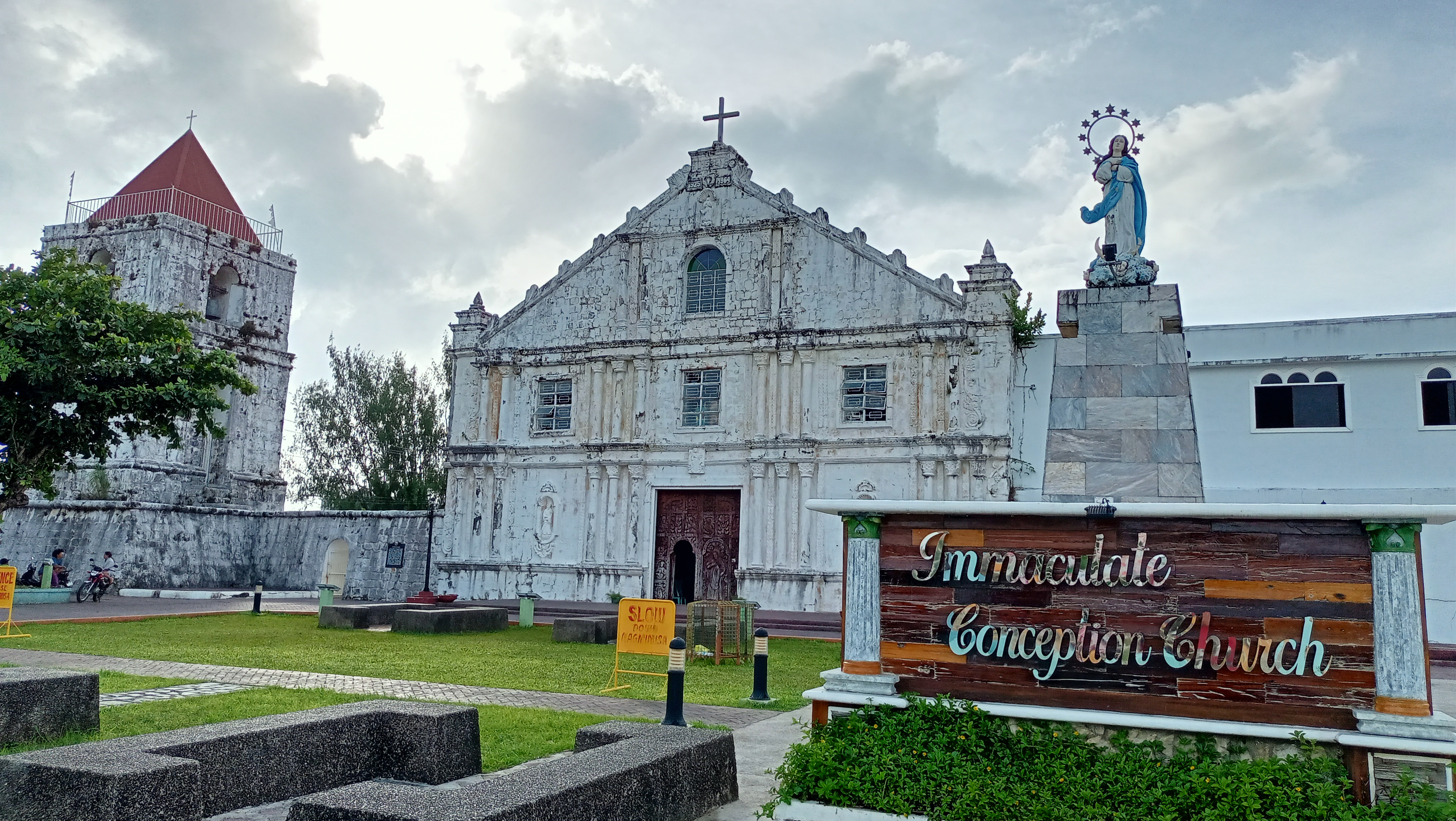
The Guiuan Church, built in the 18th century at the behest of Jesuit priests

The Spanish priest and historian Juan José Delgado was stationed in Guiuan in the 18th century. In his book Biblioteca Histórica Filipina: Historia general sacro-profana, política y natural de las islas del poniente llamadas Filipinas (1751), he recorded the old name of the region as "Guiguan." He describes it as a thin stretch of land on the southern tip of Samar. He also describes the nearby islands of "Omonhon" (Homonhon), "Soloan" (Suluan), Tubabao, "Manicaui" (Manicani), and other small islets and settlements.

The occurrence of World War II shook the town and people moved to the mountains to find comfort. On June 28, 1943, several Japanese soldiers set foot on Guiuan soil. Not as fearful and brutal as they were thought of by the local populace, a cordial relation soon existed between the conquered and the conquerors. Evacuees came down from the mountains and resumed a normal urban life. Except for a few killings of suspected traitors by both Japanese, Filipino soldiers and local guerillas, not a drop of blood was shed needlessly. This made Guiuan one of the few places in the islands where World War II did not leave so many tragic memories.

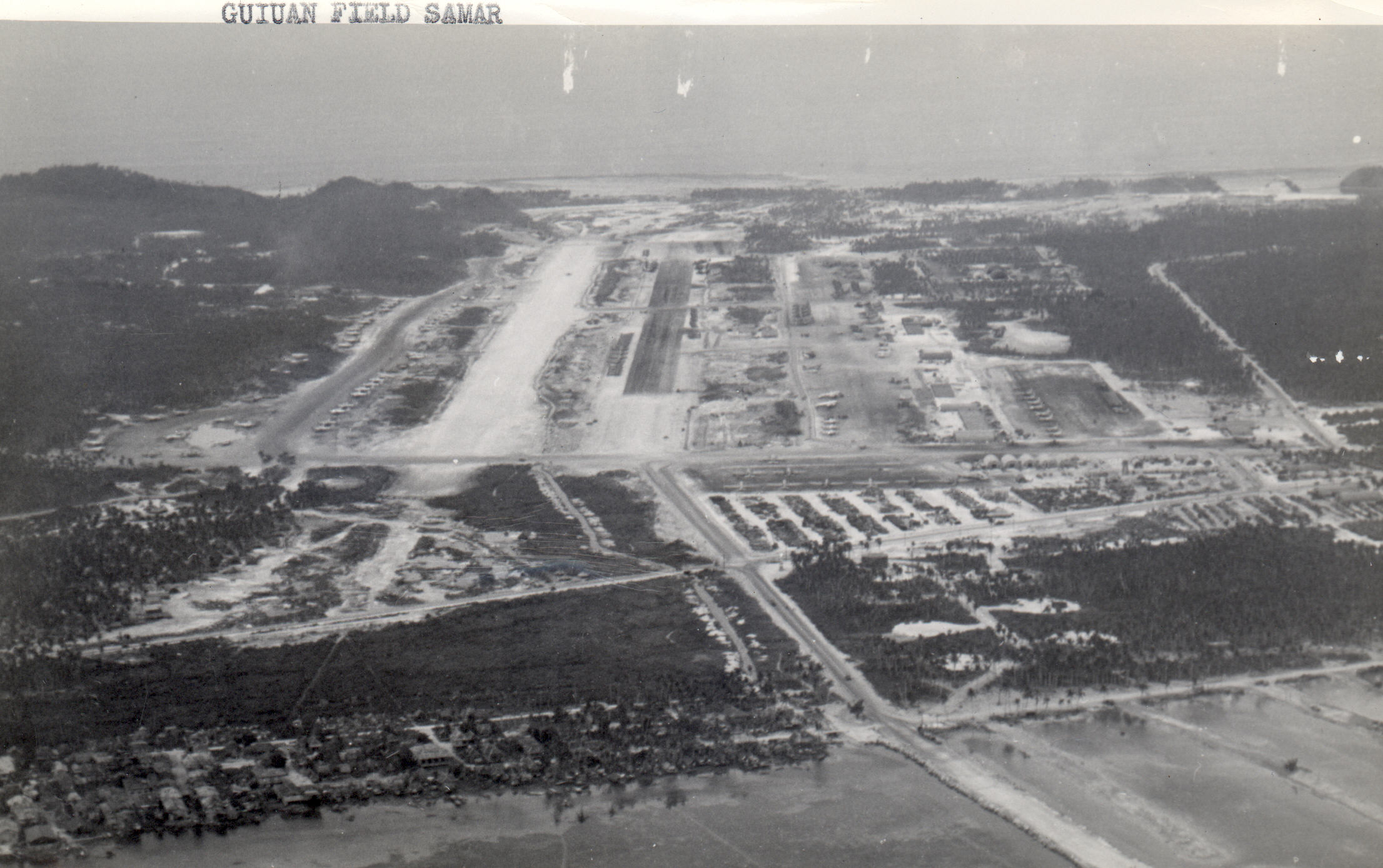
The airfield of the US naval base in Guiuan during World War II. It now serves as the town's airport.

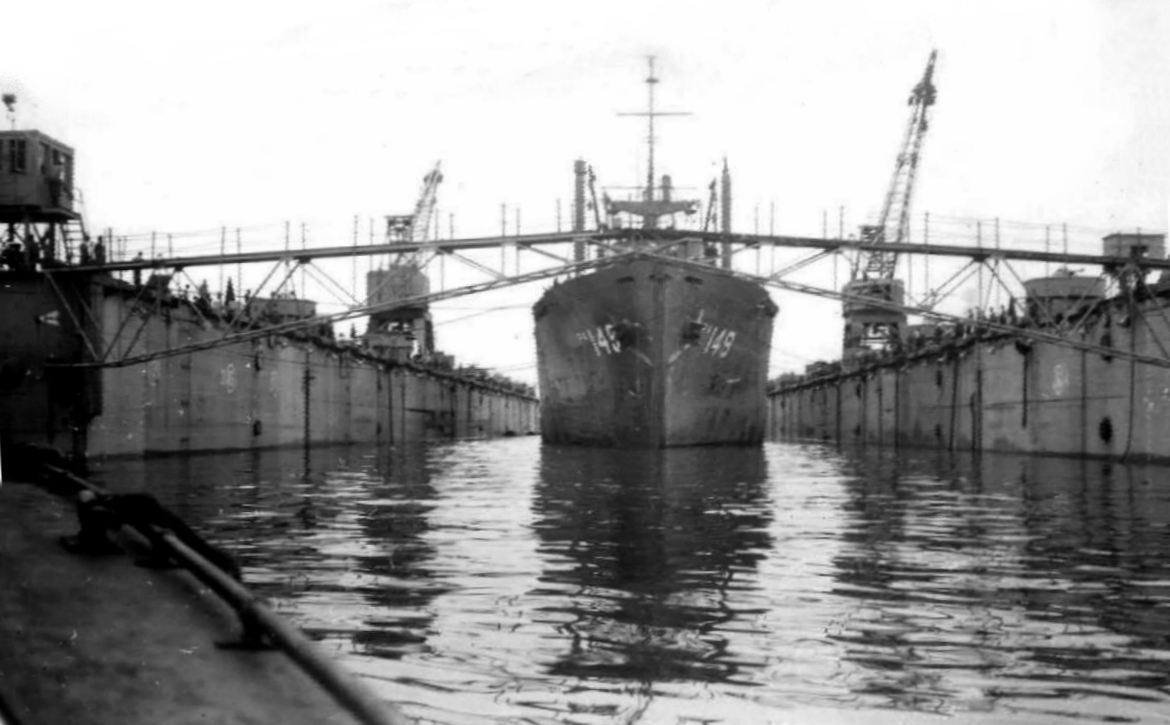
The USS ABSD-5 in Guiuan waters during World War II

The first sign of liberation of the town came on November 27, 1944, when a US Navy submarine chaser steamed the harbor for reconnaissance duty. On December 1, 1944, a fleet of LCTs, Liberty ships and barges poured into the Guiuan Bay to unload machines that was to transform Guiuan into one of the biggest Naval Bases, Leyte-Samar Naval Base, in the Far East that time, set up by the American Navy, part of the Allies. Some aircraft landed on the airstrip to rendezvous with the Necessary Evil squadrons.

Now all that is left of the American occupation are concrete slabs which once served as the foundations of a vast supply depot, and an air strip, which now serves as the town's own airport.

In 1949, the International Refugee Organization made an appeal to tackle the displacement crisis caused by the war and a precursor to the UNHCR. It wanted new homes for thousands of White Russians in the aftermath of the Bolshevik Revolution (Russian Revolutions) and subsequent civil war. More than 5,000 of them, under the care of John Maximovitch (Saint John of Shanghai and San Francisco), the Orthodox Archbishop of Shanghai who would later be canonised, were taken to the island of Tubabao, located a couple of hundred metres from the coast of Guiuan. The Russian refugees made Guiuan their home until 1951, when they moved to Australia and the United States.

In 1952, the sitios of Talisay, Bagambang, Calamrisan, Lo-ok and Barawalti, belonging to Barrio Tubabao, were separated and created into the barrio of Trinidad.

On November 10, 1978, Proclamation No. 1801 was issued declaring Guiuan as a Tourist Zone and Marine Reserve under the administration and control of the Philippine Tourism Authority (PTA).

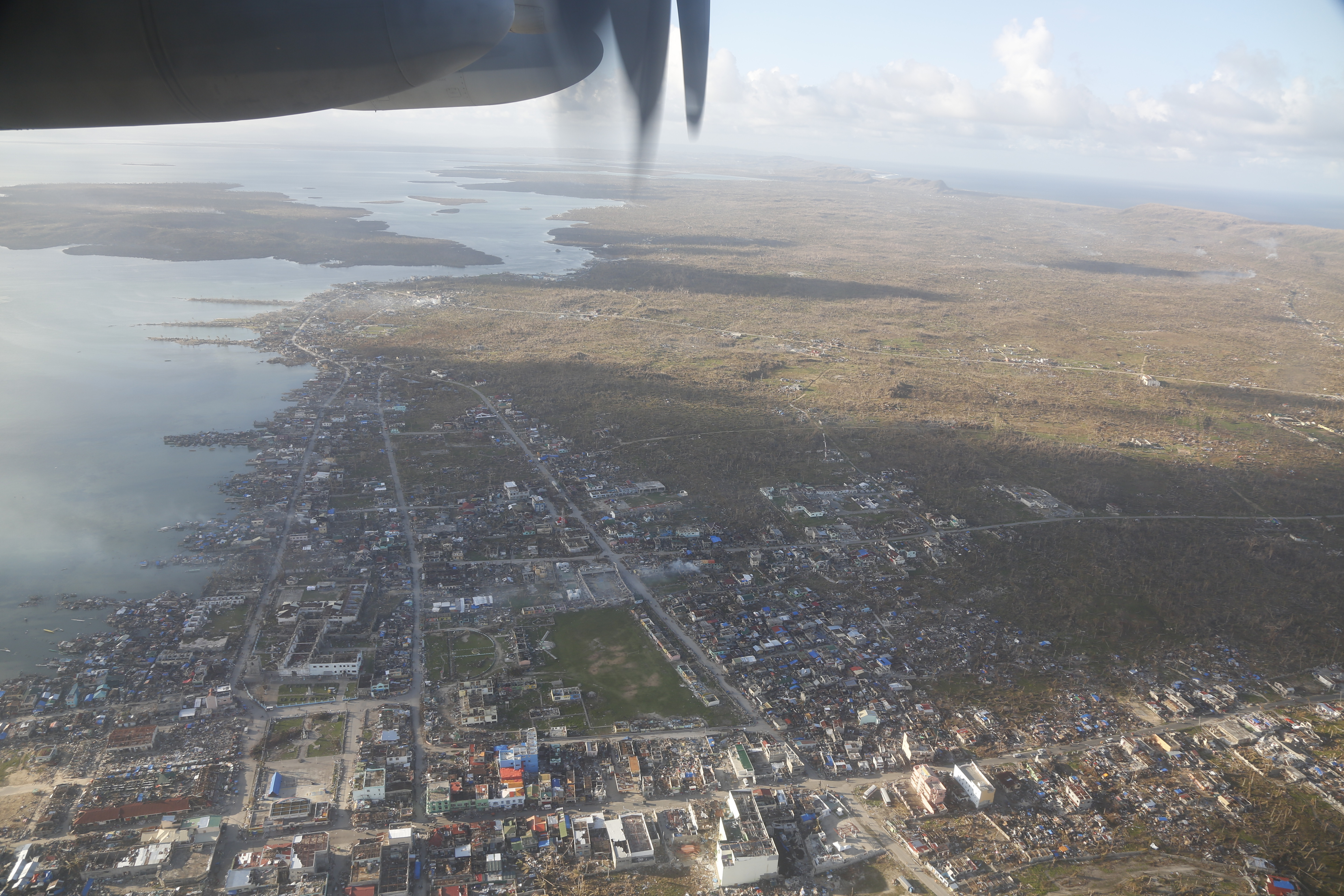
Aerial view of Guiuan in November 2013 on the aftermath of Typhoon Haiyan (Yolanda)

On November 8, 2013, the city suffered heavy damage, along with 107 fatalities, 16 missing and over 3,626 injuries, as it was hit by the eye of Typhoon Haiyan (Super Typhoon Yolanda) with maximum ten-minute sustained wind speeds of 230 km/h (145 mph). Haiyan made its first landfall over Guiuan at 04:40 PhST.

Almost every building was heavily damaged or deroofed, including the designated typhoon shelters, the Catholic Church, hospital and gymnasium. However, one house in Lactason remained intact because of the owner's effort to hold it in place with her bare hands. The woman was later identified as Mana Maring, a moron (a Filipino delicacy) maker and vendor.

== Geography ==
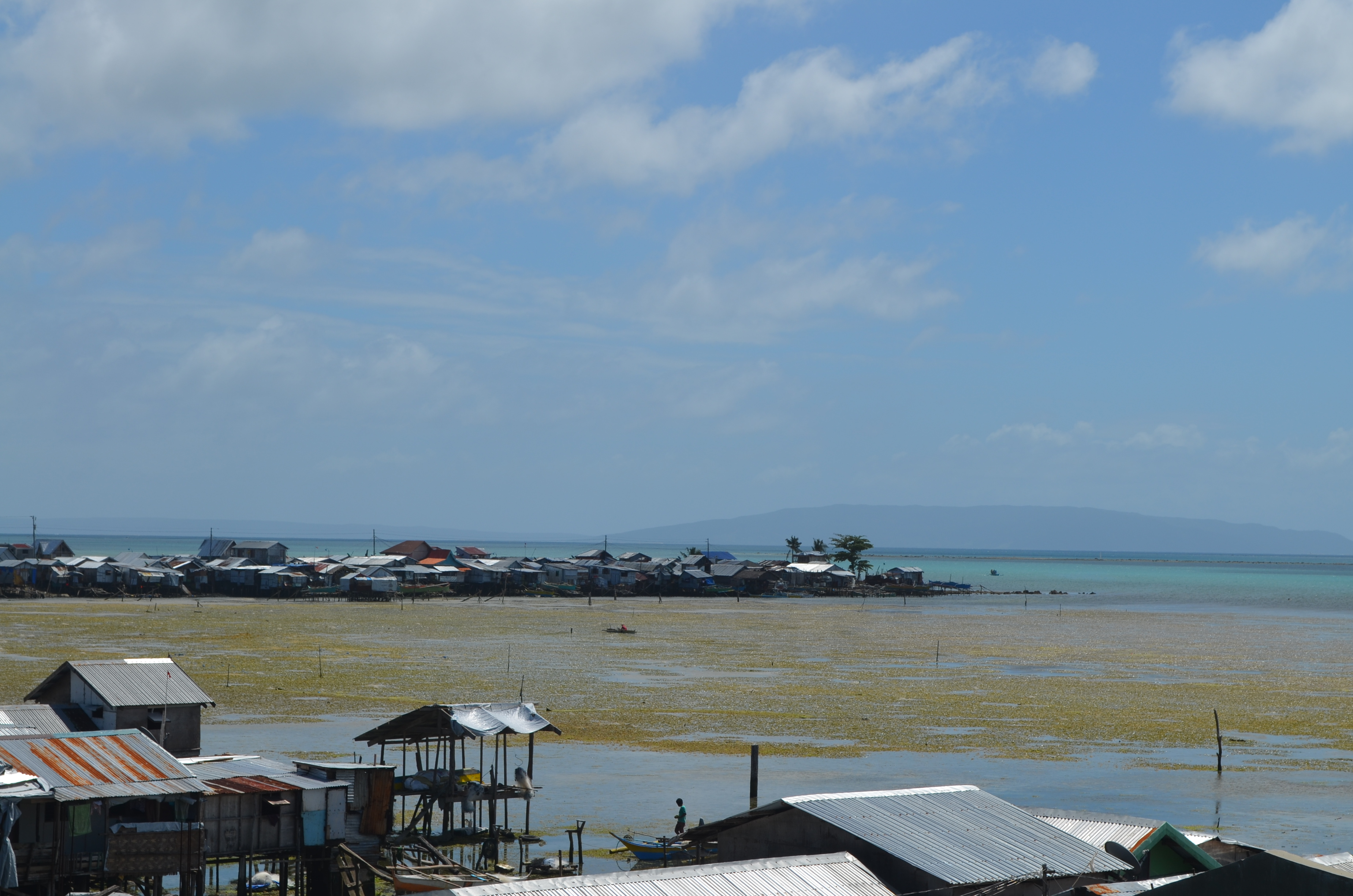
Houses in Guiuan's shoreline facing Leyte Gulf, 2016

The municipality of Guiuan is located at the southeasternmost tip of Samar Island. It is bounded on the north by the municipality of Mercedes, on the east by the Philippine Sea and the Pacific Ocean, on the south by the Surigao Strait, and on the west by Leyte Gulf.

Clustered around the municipality are numerous islands and islets such as Manicani, Calicoan, Sulangan, Candulo, Homonhon, Suluan and Tubabao. They are protected as part of the marine reserve known as the Guiuan Protected Landscape and Seascape.

Guiuan is 109 kilometers (68 mi) south of Borongan and 154 kilometers (96 mi) from Tacloban. It has a total land area of 175.49 square kilometers (67.76 sq mi). It is composed of sixty (60) barangays and the only town in the province with biggest number of island barangays.

=== Barangays ===
Administrative map of Guiuan

Guiuan is politically subdivided into 60 barangays, 37 of which is located in the mainland of Guiuan, i.e. the portion of Guiuan that is contiguous with Samar Island, and the remaining 23 in the islands surrounding the mainland. Each barangay consists of puroks and some have sitios.

==== Mainland barangays ====
Poblacion barangays: The poblacion, or town center, is located on the southwestern coastal area of the Guiuan mainland, facing Leyte Gulf. A ward is named before the Allies headquarters and served as a Medical center for the Allies Western Pacific Command.

- Poblacion Ward 1
- Poblacion Ward 2
- Poblacion Ward 3
- Poblacion Ward 4
- Poblacion Ward 4-A
- Poblacion Ward 5
- Poblacion Ward 6
- Poblacion Ward 7
- Poblacion Ward 8
- Poblacion Ward 9
- Poblacion Ward 9-A
- Poblacion Ward 10
- Poblacion Ward 11
- Poblacion Ward 12
- Alingarog
- Bagua
- Banahao
- Barbo
- Bucao
- Bungtod
- Cagdara-o
- Campoyong
- Cantahay
- Cogon
- Dalaragan
- Gahoy
- Hagna
- Hollywood
- Lupok
- Mayana
- Salug
- Santo Niño (or Sto. Niño)
- Sapao
- Surok
- Tagporo
- Taytay
- Timala

==== Island barangays ====
Barangays in Homonhon Island:

- Bitaugan
- Cagusu-an
- Canawayon
- Casuguran
- Culasi
- Habag
- Inapulangan
- Pagbabangnan

Barangays in Tubabao Island and neighboring islets:

- Camparang
- San Antonio
- San Juan
- San Pedro
- Trinidad

Barangays in Calicoan Island and neighboring islets:

- Baras
- Ngolos
- Pagnamitan
- Sulangan

Barangays in Manicani Island:

- Banaag
- Buenavista
- Hamorawon
- San Jose

Other island barangays:

- Victory – Victory Group of Islands
- Suluan – Suluan Island

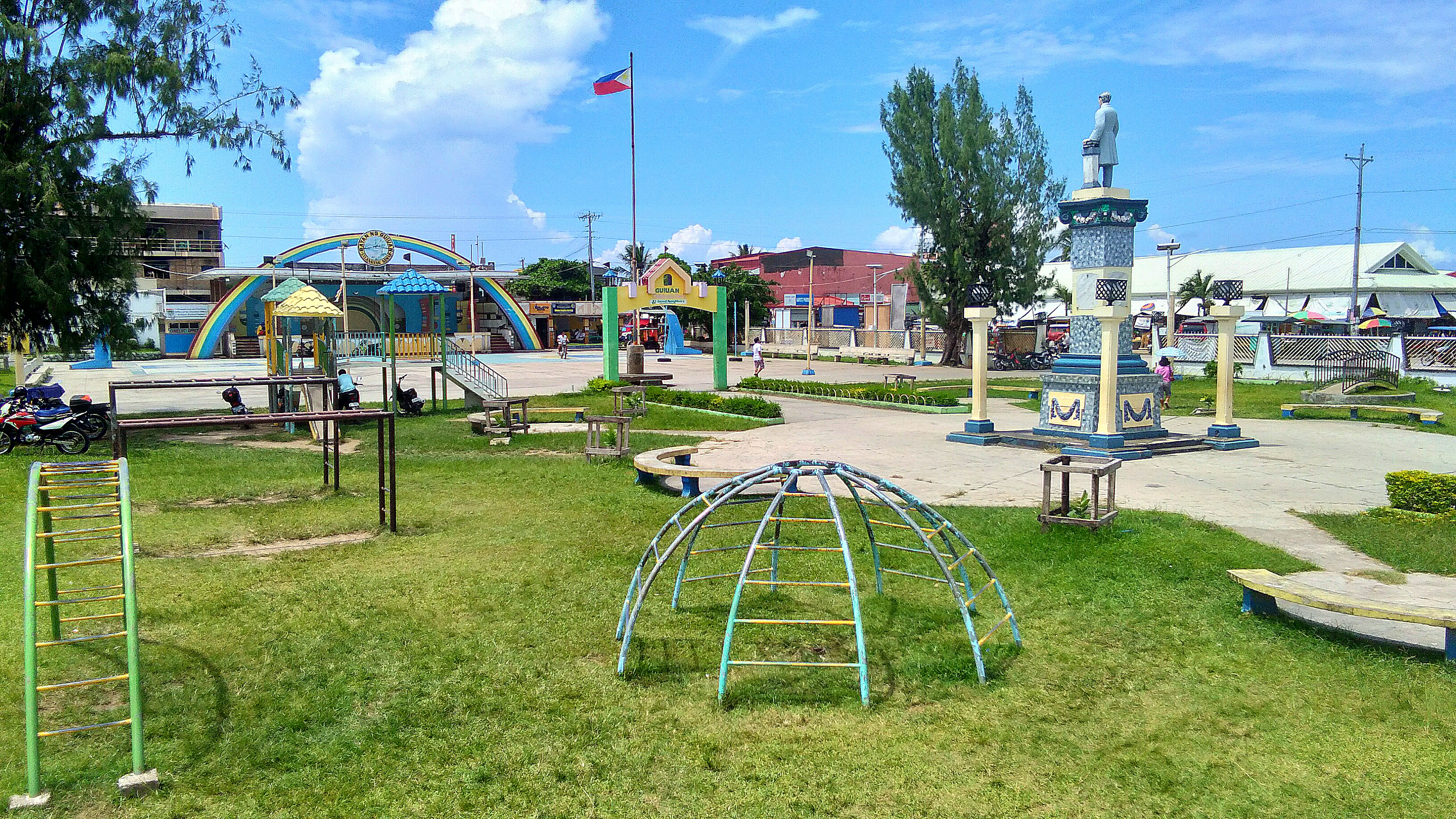
The Guiuan Town Plaza in 2019, part of Poblacion Ward 7

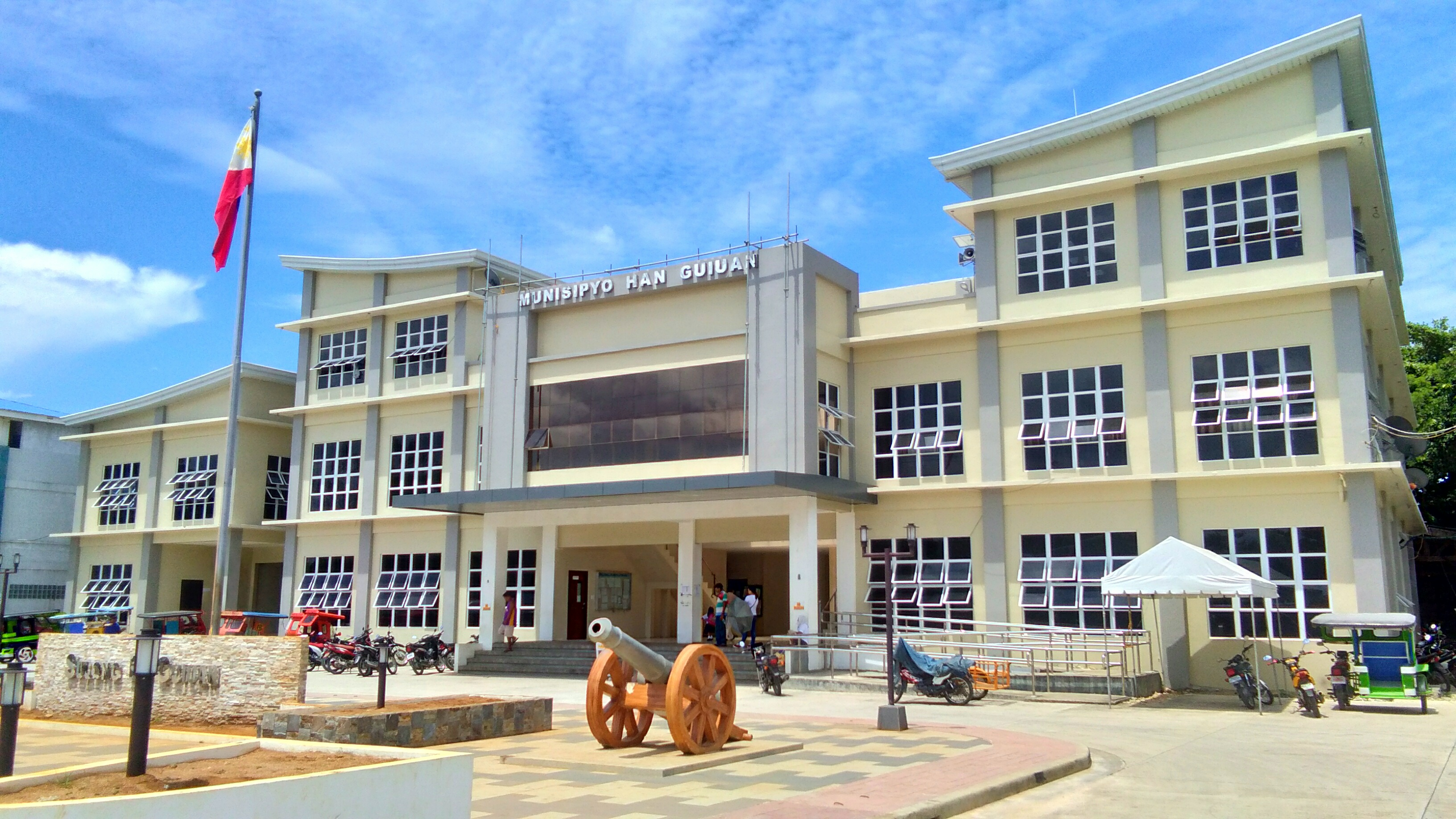
The Guiuan Municipal Hall in 2019, part of Poblacion Ward 9-A

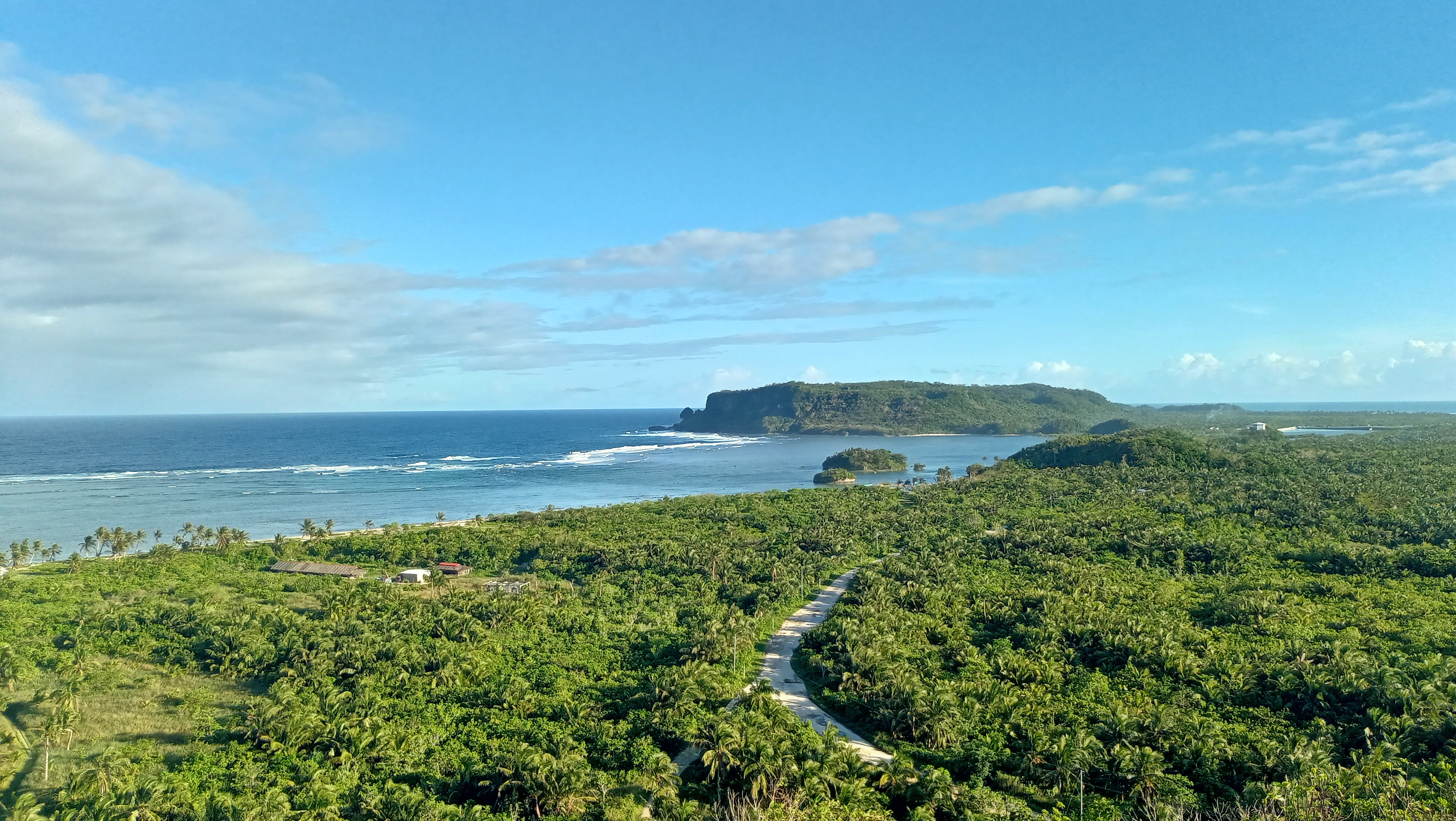
View of Calicoan Island and the Philippine Sea from Barangay Sapao

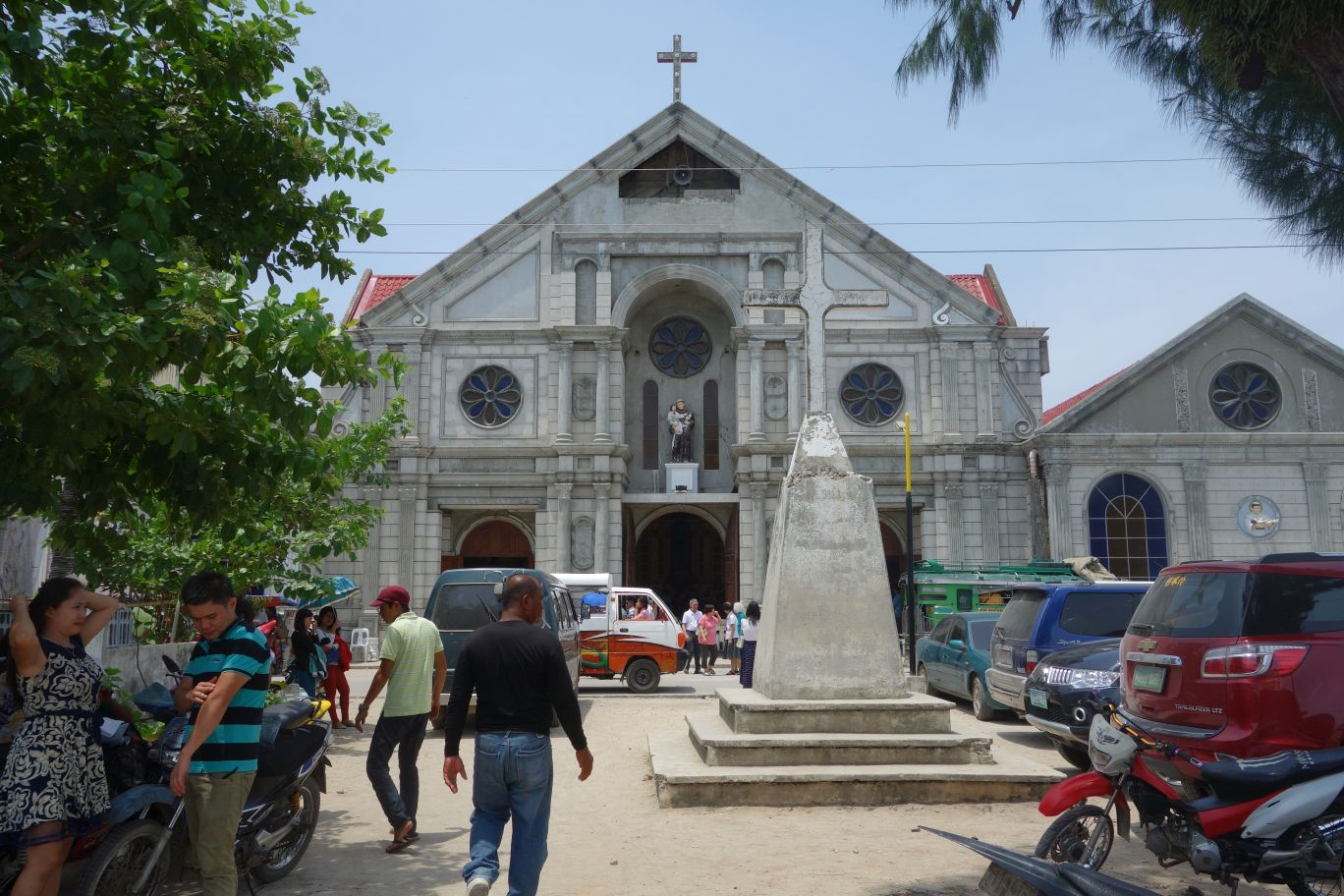
The St. Anthony of Padua Church in Barangay Sulangan

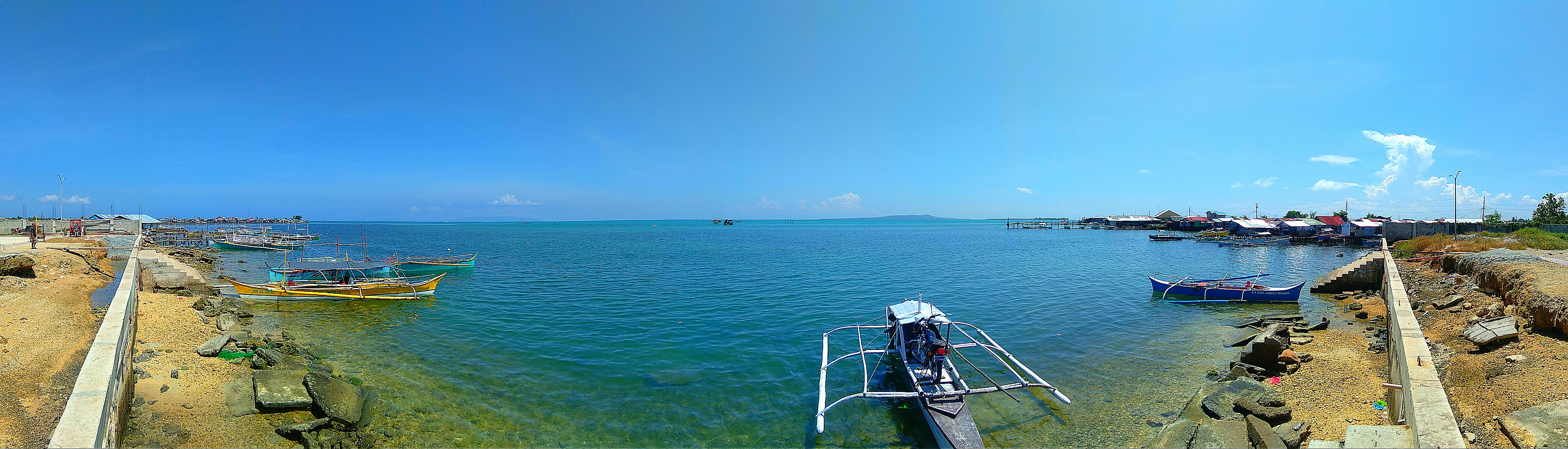
View of Leyte Gulf facing southwest from the Guiuan Integrated Transport Terminal in 2019, showing the islands of Homonhon (left, nearly invisible due to haze), Manicani (near center), and Inatunglan (to the immediate right of Manicani)

=== Climate ===
Climate data for Guiuan, Eastern Samar (1991–2020, extremes 1973–2023)
Month	Jan	Feb	Mar	Apr	May	Jun	Jul	Aug	Sep	Oct	Nov	Dec	Year
Record high °C (°F)	33.0 (91.4)	34.4 (93.9)	34.8 (94.6)	36.6 (97.9)	37.6 (99.7)	37.0 (98.6)	35.4 (95.7)	36.1 (97.0)	36.7 (98.1)	35.6 (96.1)	36.0 (96.8)	33.5 (92.3)	37.6 (99.7)
Mean daily maximum °C (°F)	28.6 (83.5)	29.0 (84.2)	29.8 (85.6)	31.1 (88.0)	32.1 (89.8)	31.7 (89.1)	31.1 (88.0)	31.5 (88.7)	31.6 (88.9)	30.9 (87.6)	29.9 (85.8)	29.1 (84.4)	30.5 (86.9)
Daily mean °C (°F)	26.2 (79.2)	26.4 (79.5)	27.0 (80.6)	28.1 (82.6)	28.9 (84.0)	28.5 (83.3)	28.0 (82.4)	28.4 (83.1)	28.3 (82.9)	27.9 (82.2)	27.3 (81.1)	26.7 (80.1)	27.6 (81.7)
Mean daily minimum °C (°F)	23.9 (75.0)	23.9 (75.0)	24.3 (75.7)	25.1 (77.2)	25.6 (78.1)	25.2 (77.4)	24.9 (76.8)	25.2 (77.4)	25.1 (77.2)	25.2 (77.4)	24.0 (75.2)	24.4 (75.9)	24.8 (76.6)
Record low °C (°F)	19.0 (66.2)	19.3 (66.7)	18.0 (64.4)	19.3 (66.7)	20.7 (69.3)	20.3 (68.5)	18.5 (65.3)	20.6 (69.1)	20.0 (68.0)	20.0 (68.0)	19.2 (66.6)	20.0 (68.0)	18.0 (64.4)
Average rainfall mm (inches)	411.5 (16.20)	289.5 (11.40)	247.1 (9.73)	148.1 (5.83)	136.7 (5.38)	207.9 (8.19)	217.8 (8.57)	149.4 (5.88)	177.1 (6.97)	269.6 (10.61)	487.8 (19.20)	501.0 (19.72)	3,243.5 (127.70)
Average rainy days (≥ 1.0 mm)	21	17	16	13	12	16	14	10	12	17	21	24	193
Average relative humidity (%)	89	88	87	86	86	87	87	86	86	88	89	91	88
Source: PAGASA

== Demography ==
Population census of Guiuan

Year	Pop.	±% p.a.
1903	11,594	—
1918	15,870	+2.12%
1939	23,110	+1.81%
1948	27,202	+1.83%
1960	22,881	−1.43%
1970	26,529	+1.49%
1975	28,709	+1.60%
1980	30,689	+1.34%

Year	Pop.	±% p.a.
1990	33,825	+0.98%
1995	35,447	+0.88%
2000	38,694	+1.90%
2007	43,469	+1.62%
2010	47,037	+2.91%
2015	52,991	+2.30%
2020	53,361	+0.15%
2024	52,749	−0.28%

Source: Philippine Statistics Authority

Guiuan recorded a total population of 38,694 in 2000, which rose to 47,037 in 2010 and 52,991 in 2015. It has the second largest population in Eastern Samar (after Borongan) with a population density of 270 persons per km^{2}.

Majority or 97.7% of the Guiuananons speak the Waray-Waray language. Less than 3.0% speak Cebuano (including the Boholano dialect) and Tagalog. A few percentage can converse in English, with varying degrees of proficiency.

== Economy ==
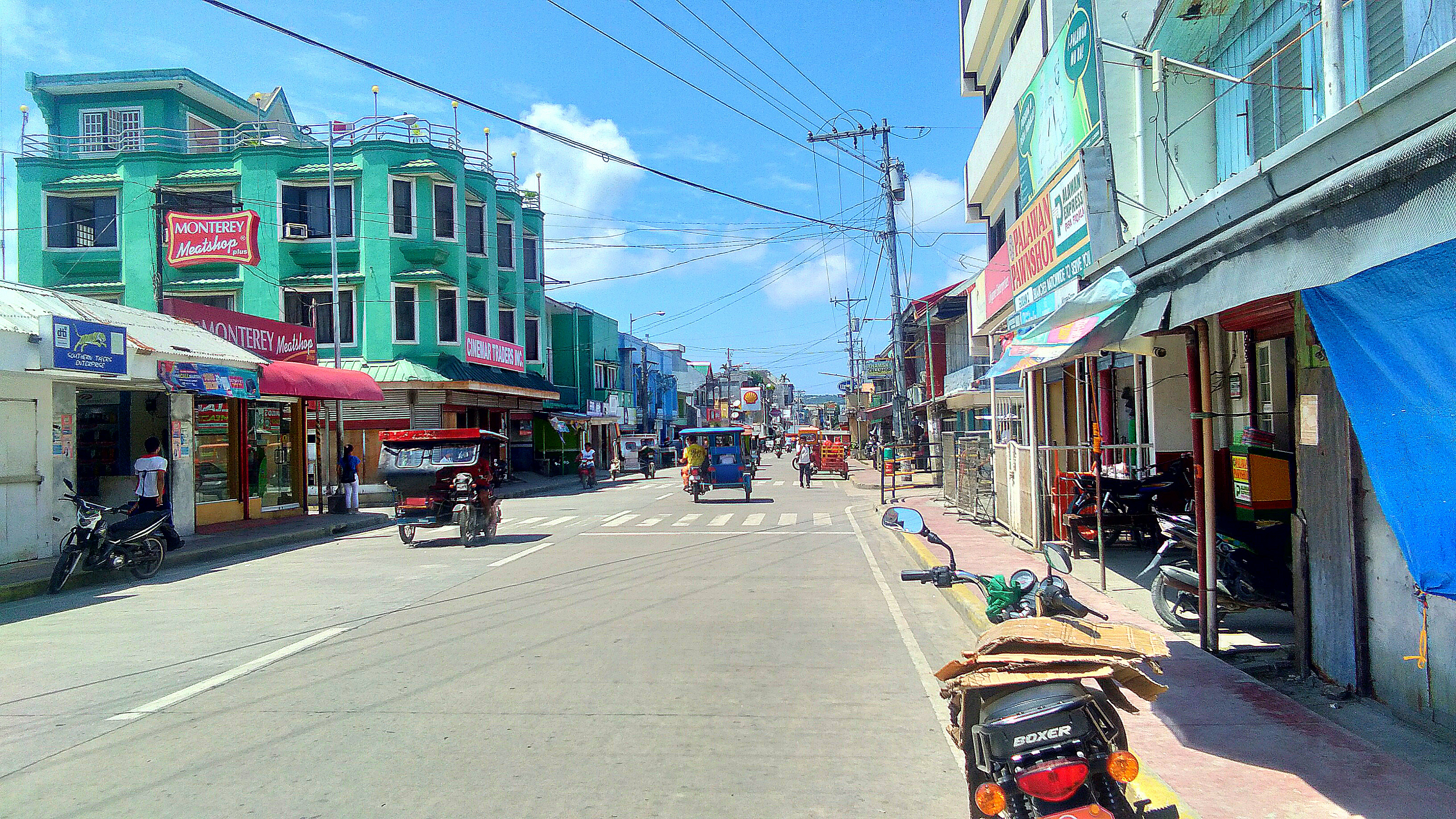
Lugay Street, one of the main thoroughfares in downtown Guiuan

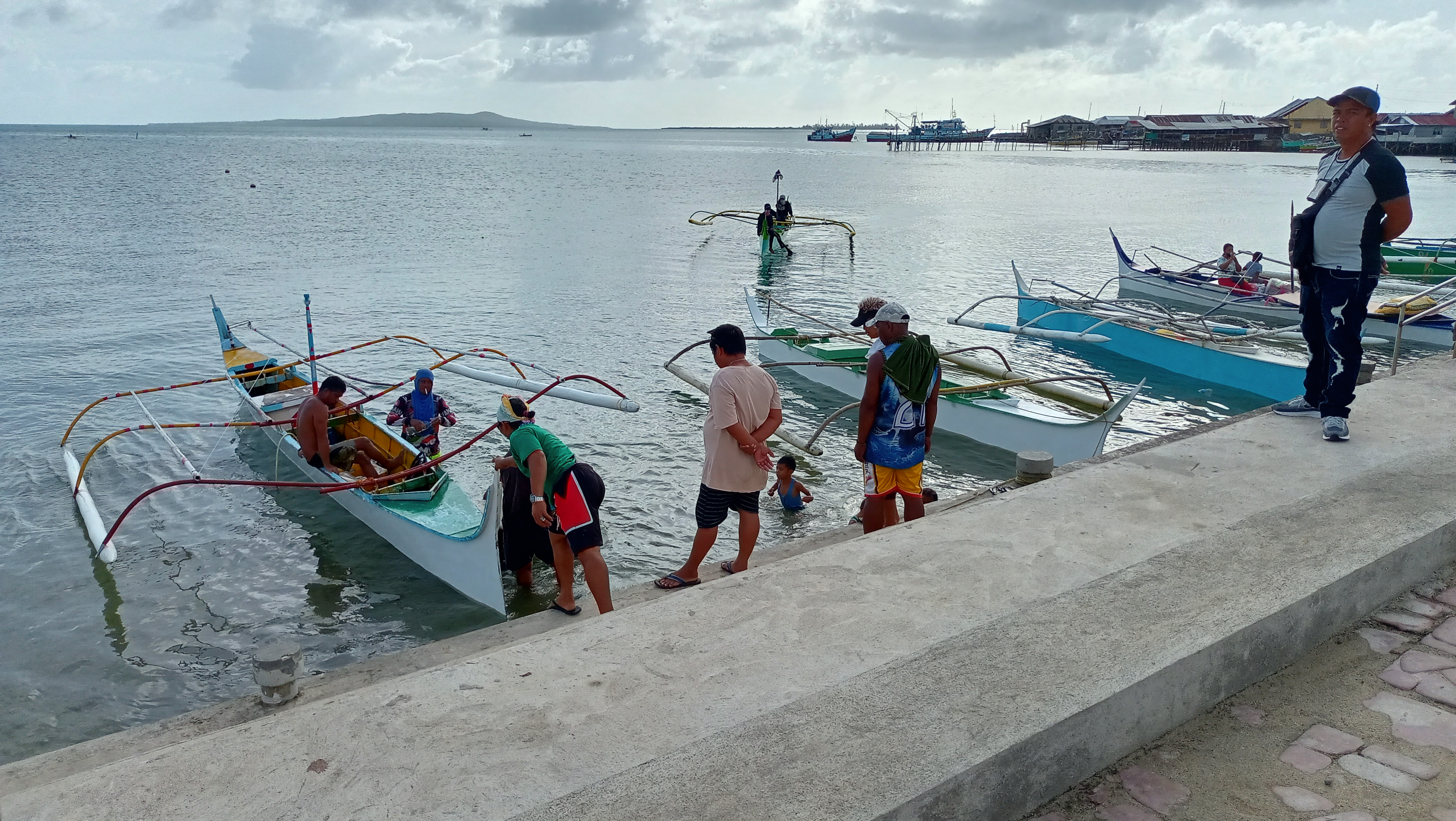
Fisherfolks at the Guiuan Integrated Transport Terminal in April 2022

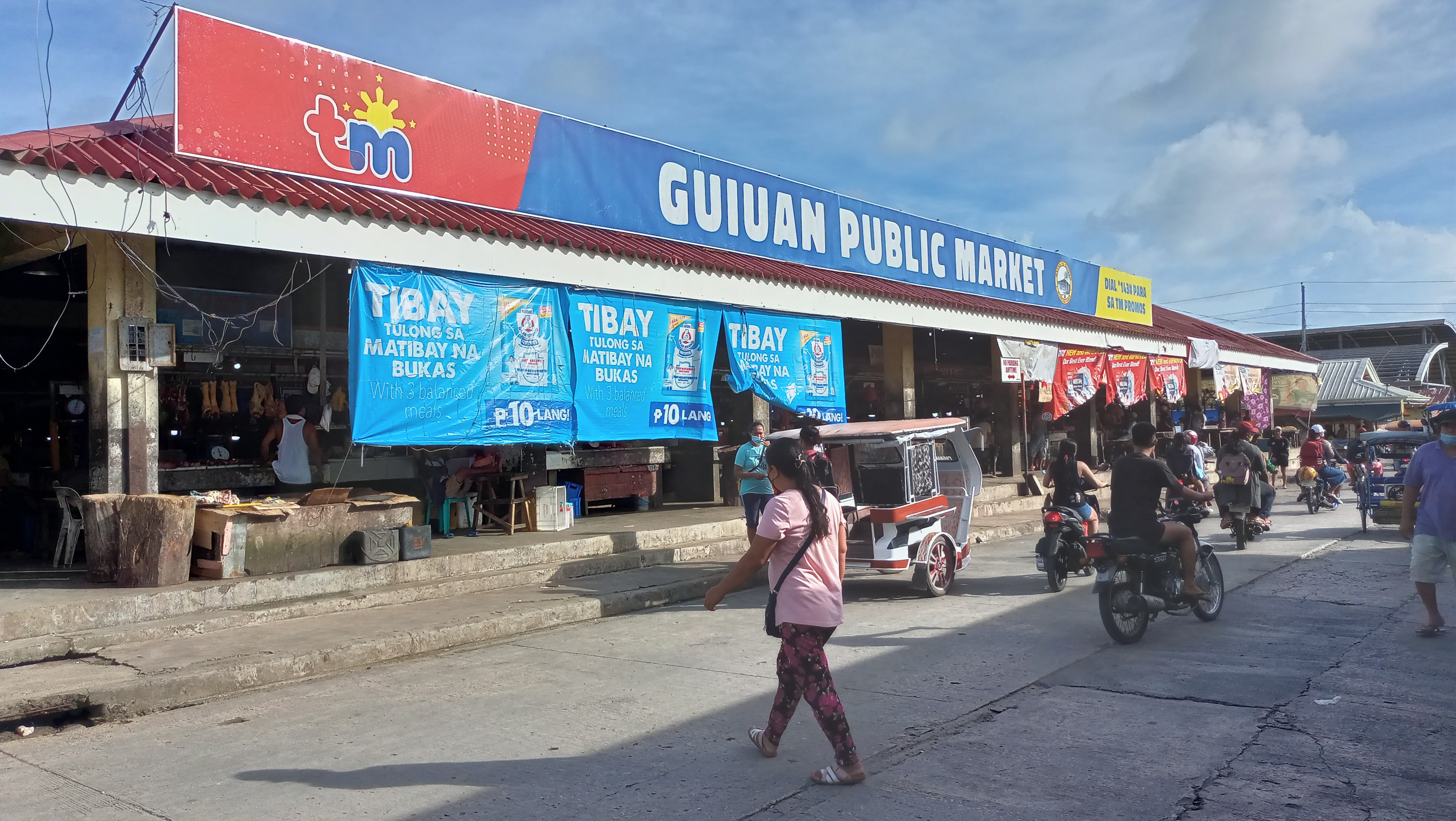
The Guiuan Public Market's wet section (fish and meat)

Guiuan is classified as a second income class municipality as of CY 2008. Its Total Financial Resources amounted to 67.71 million pesos. Its Internal Revenue Allotment (IRA) represents 78.0% of its total financial resources.

Being a fishing community and the only municipality with the most number of island barangays, the town is rich in fishery and aquatic resources. It is considered by the fisheries authorities as the best fishing belt in the region.

The coastal waters offer almost all species of marine life: euchuema, abalone, ornamental fish, lobster and the golden cowry (known for its extraordinary golden sheen). They also offer delicacies, shellcraft products as well as fresh and processed marine products.

Existing land use indicates a predominance of agriculture which covers 38.2% of the total land area. Most of the agricultural lands are dominantly planted with coconut trees. Other major crops include vegetables, root crops, palay, corn, banana and other fruit trees, coffee and pineapple.

The municipality is likewise rich in mineral resources. It has an estimated mineral reserve of bauxite, nickel and titaferous magnitie of more than 26.7 million metric tons. The most companies that Mined in the Municipality were Japanese during the 70s, 80s and the 90s, they brought about raw Mineral Ore to Japan then by empty ship back they brought with them some Japanese Surplus Motors and chopped spare parts including Electrical Appliances.

Poverty incidence of Guiuan (%)

Source: Philippine Statistics Authority

== Transportation ==
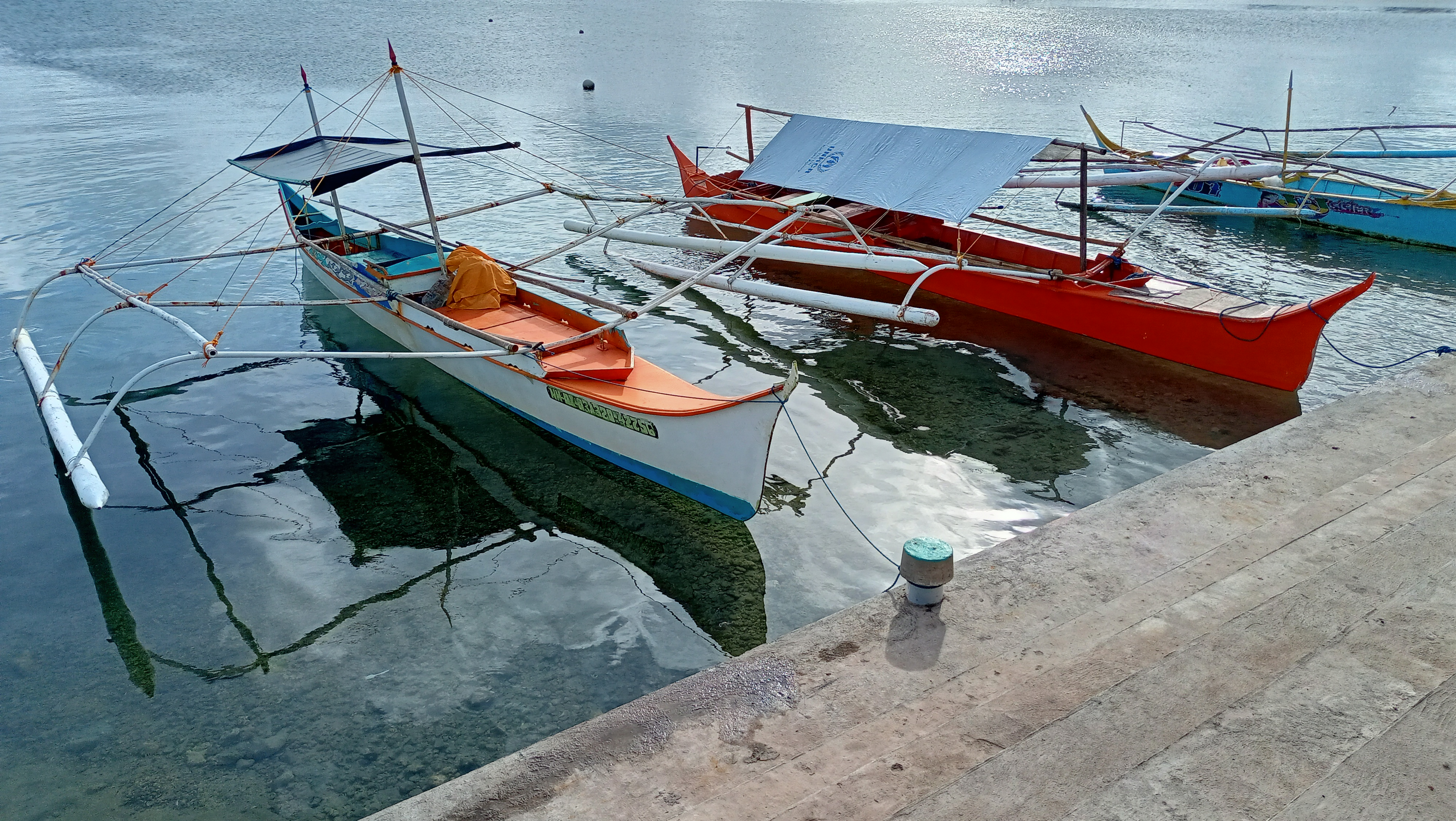
Motorized outrigger boats moored at the Guiuan Integrated Transport Terminal

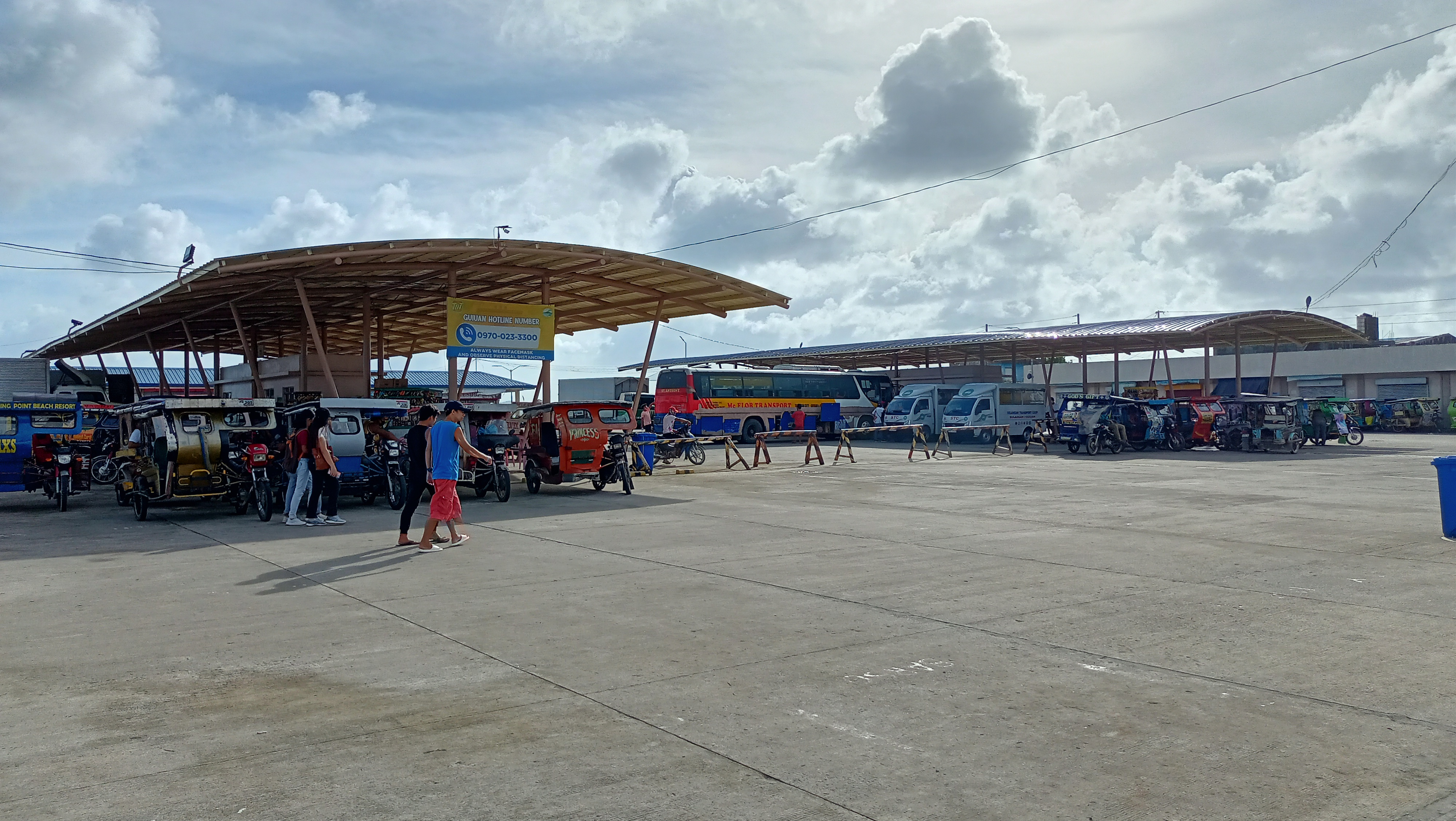
Motorized rickshaws, buses and other vehicles on stand-by in the Guiuan Integrated Transport Terminal

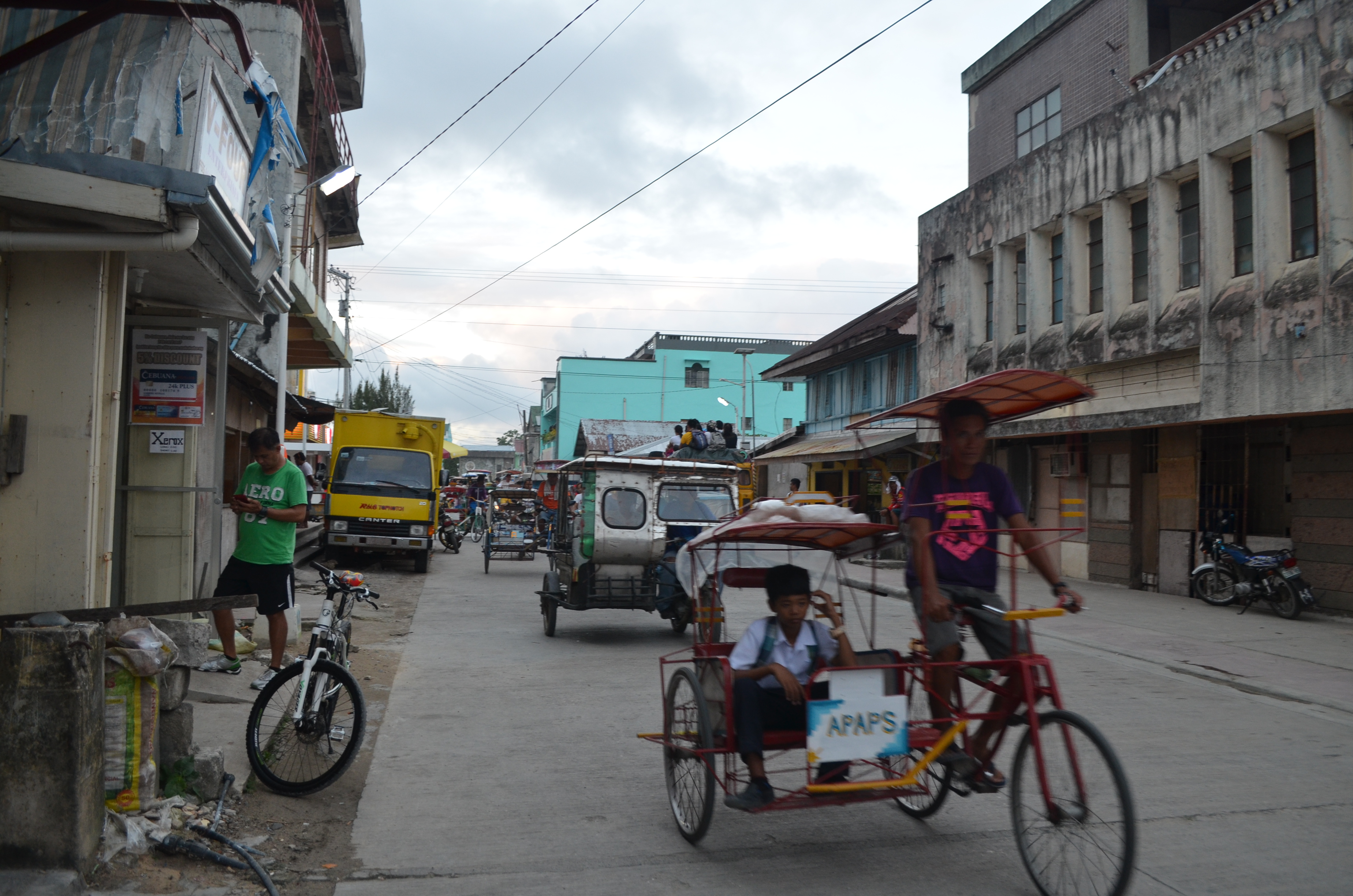
A busy street in downtown Guiuan, with both human-driven and motorized rickshaws

US military planes in Guiuan Airport on the aftermath of Typhoon Haiyan (Yolanda)

By air

Guiuan Airport has a 2,800-metre (6,870ft) runway which can service light private planes, chartered cargo and military planes. The Guiuan Airport was upgraded in 2010. Cebu-based airline Mid-Sea Express had scheduled flights from Cebu City to Guiuan twice weekly on Saturdays and Mondays, using a 19-seater Jetstream 32 aircraft. Service started in 2012 but has now been discontinued.

By land

The town is accessible by land with highway connection from Tacloban City, about three-four hours travel. Several buses and vans regularly shuttle passengers to Guiuan. It is also accessible from Borongan. Alternatively, several bus companies have daily trips to Guiuan from Manila. Travel time is approximately twenty-one hours.

Since the town is a coastal municipality, it has a small seaport operational throughout the year.

== Point of interest ==
Sulangan Church

The church is also known as The Shrine of St. Anthony of Padua. It is known to both the locals and pilgrims around Eastern Visayas because of being miraculous. Saint Anthony of Padua is considered the patron saint for lost items, articles, people, or even spiritual goods. Many people visit the church to ask Saint Anthony even the most impossible wishes and the saint is believed to grant them.

Linao Cave

Linao Cave is one of the most famous attractions in Guiuan because of its crystal clear water. The cave is named linao which means "clear" in Waray.

== Utilities ==
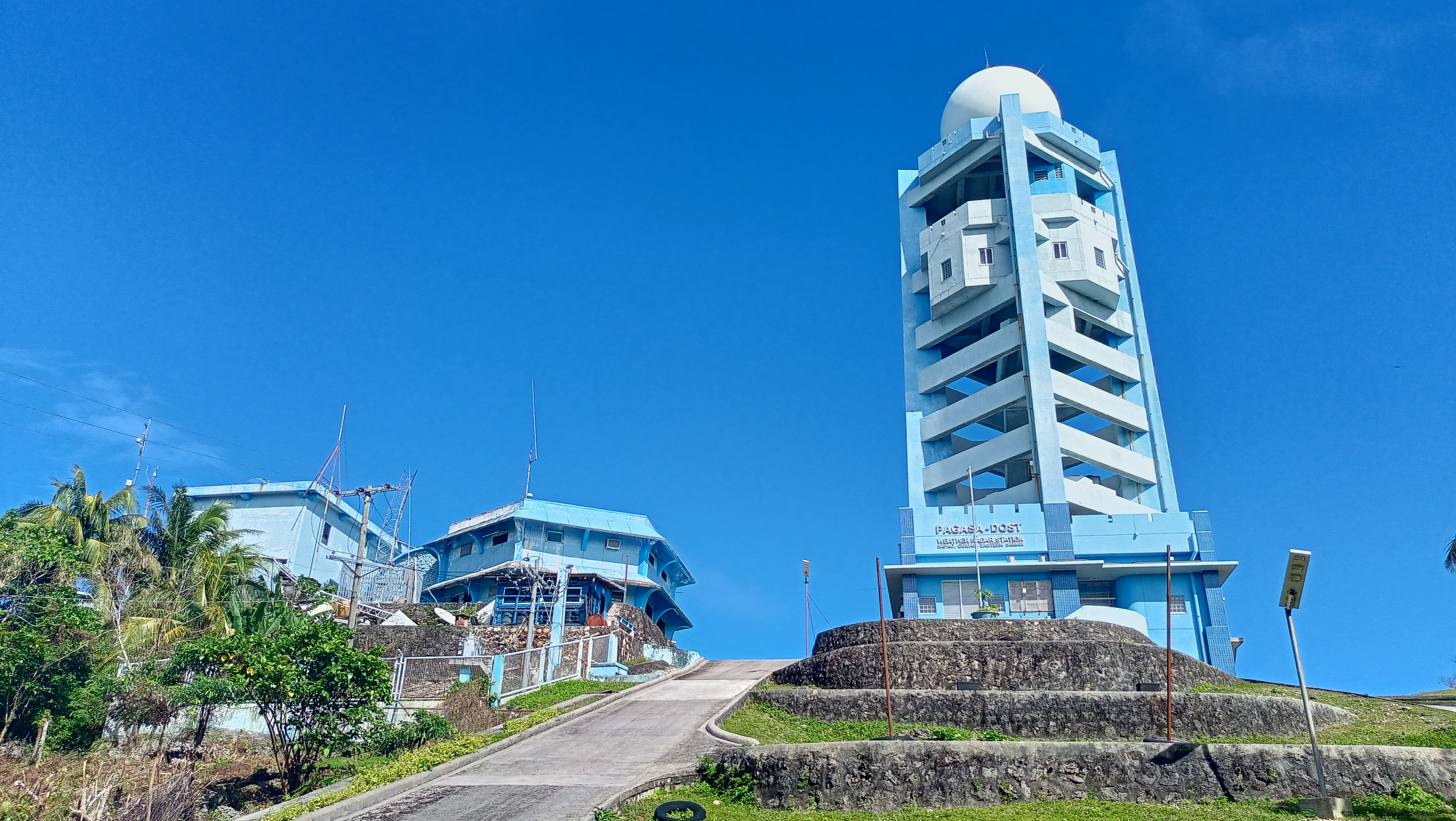
The DOST-PAGASA Guiuan Weather Station in Barangay Sapao

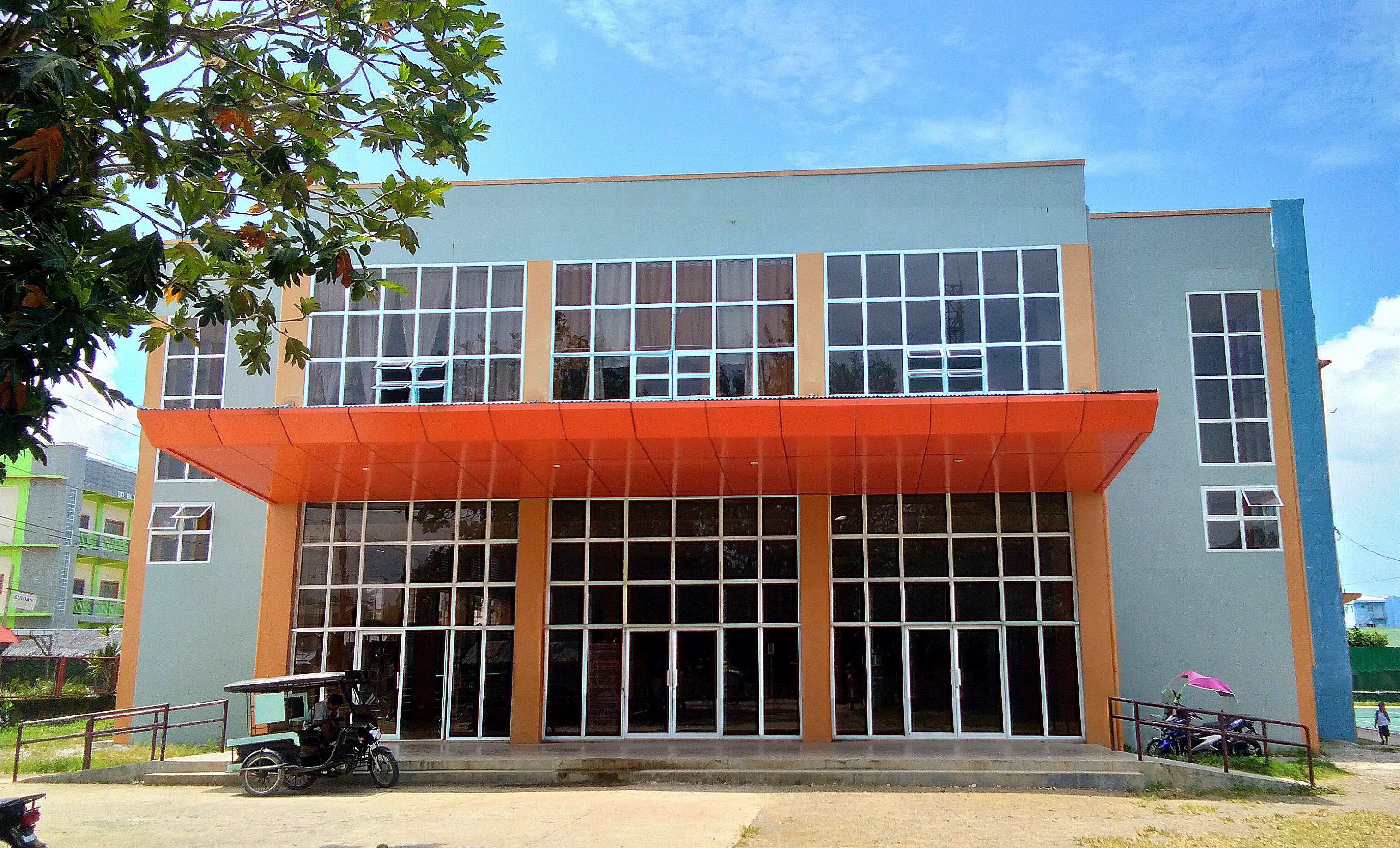
The Guiuan Gymnasium in Poblacion Ward 8

Telephone companies operating in the municipality includes TELECOM, Globelines and Bayantel. Smart and Globe cellular phone companies are also operational. The town also has a local radio station, Radyo Natin Guiuan (103.7 MHz), serving Guiuan and neighboring areas in Eastern Visayas.

In 2004, Eastern Samar Electric Cooperative (ESAMELCO) was able to energize Guiuan, Calicoan Island up to Sulangan covering 37 out of 60 barangays. Island barangays are served with electricity through generator sets either privately owned or operated by the barangay council. However, electricity shortages are frequent and subscribers experience weekly power failures, lasting for 10 to 12 hours or for 24 hours in severe cases.

Guiuan is also the site of one of the weather stations of the Philippine Atmospheric, Geophysical and Astronomical Services Administration, located in Barangay Sapao. Positioned at 60 meters (200 ft) above sea level, the facility consists of a Surface Synoptic Station for usual weather observation and a Doppler weather radar station for detecting intensity (reflectivity) and velocity (by Doppler effect) of distant weather elements. The radar station was built and renovated with the aid of the Japan International Cooperation Agency (JICA).

== Notable people ==
- Sheen Gonzales - member of the Philippine House of Representatives since 2025
- José Lugay Raquel - member of the Philippine House of Representatives from 1916 to 1922
