= Suluan =

Island in Eastern Samar, Philippines

Suluan Island
Native name: Isla han Sulu-an
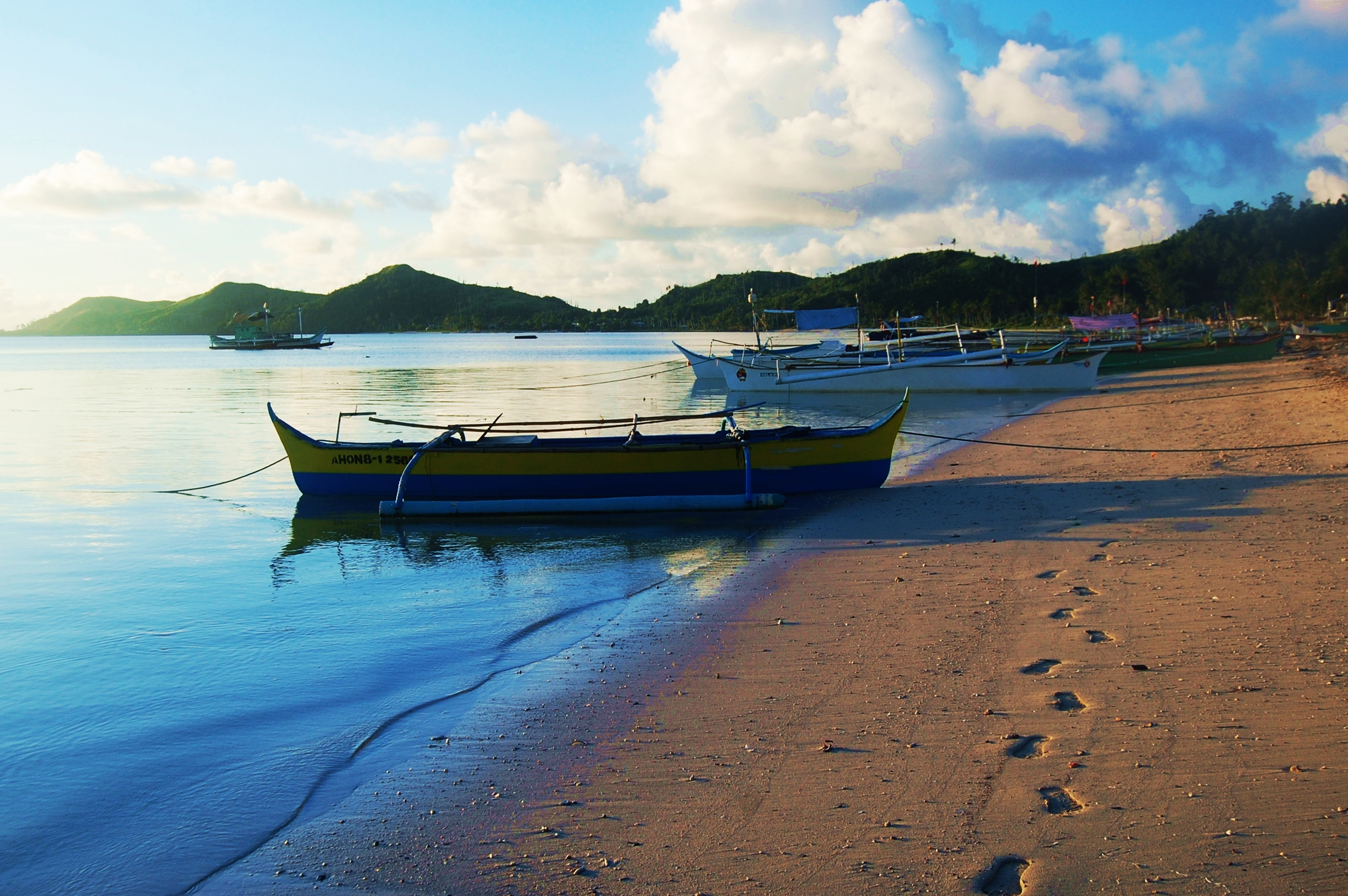

- Location within Philippines

Geography
- Coordinates: 10°45′49″N 125°57′23″E
- Archipelago: Philippines
- Adjacent to: Leyte Gulf; Philippine Sea
- Region: Eastern Visayas Region VIII
- Province: Samar
- Municipality: Guiuan, Eastern Samar
- Barangay: Sulu-an

Demographics
- Demonym: Sulu-anon

Suluan is an island barangay in the Philippines, in the municipality of Guiuan, Eastern Samar. It lies east of Leyte Gulf and west of Emden Deep. The inhabitants of the island were the first Filipinos to trade and interact with Ferdinand Magellan's expedition which anchored on the nearby (then uninhabited) island of Homonhon on March 16, 1521.

== History ==
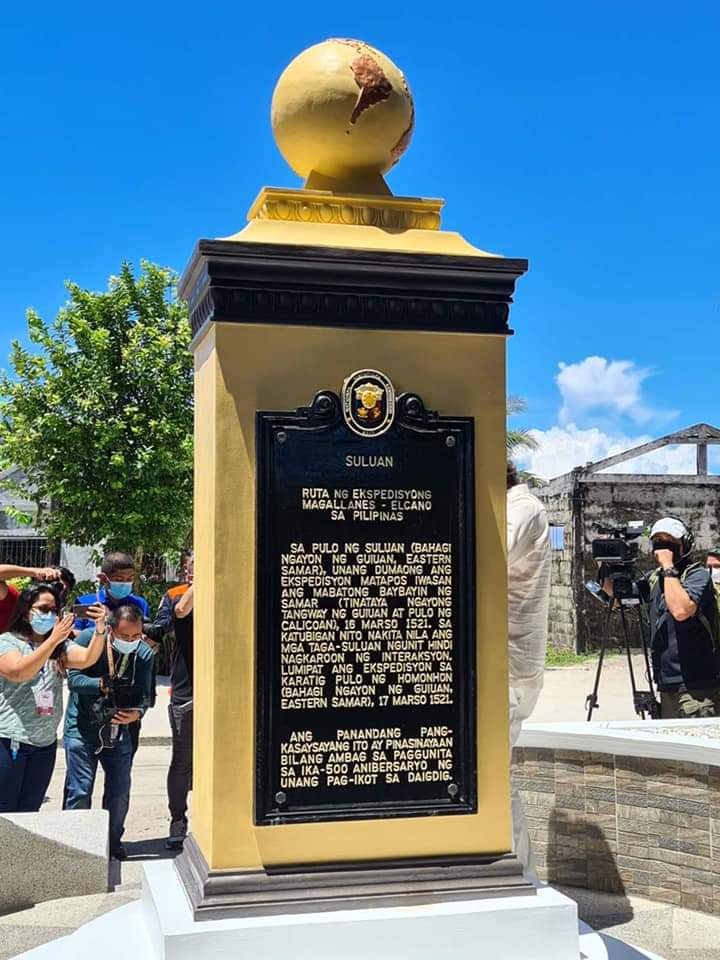
Historical marker installed in 2021 to commemorate the 500th anniversary of the arrival of Magellan in the waters of the island.

On March 16, 1521, after 98 days of crossing the Pacific Ocean, Magellan's voyage dropped anchor on the island of Homonhon ("Humunu" in Pigafetta's account). Although Samar ("Zamal") was their first land sighting from afar, Magellan's choice of anchoring on a much smaller island was meant as a security precaution as the island was then uninhabited. On March 18, they were spotted by fishermen from the nearby island of Suluan ("Zuluan").

The islanders called their other leaders together and met with Magellan's crew on Homonhon. Magellan gave them gifts of small trade items. In return, the people of Suluan gave fish, a jar of "uraca" (coconut liquor), bananas (which Pigafetta called "figs"), and two coconuts (which Pigafetta described in great detail). They conversed extensively with the crew and gave them the names of the islands, in return, Magellan gave them a tour of the ship, showing them their spices and the firing the ship's mortars for them. They promised to return with more supplies later, as they did not bring much since they were just fishing. They returned on March 22 with other supplies to trade, including more coconuts, palm liquor, sweet oranges, and a rooster. Magellan and his crew spent a week interacting with the tattooed locals of Suluan, whom they described "pleasant and conversable," before they left for Limasawa.

The name of the island is derived from the word sulu, the Waray-waray word for a coconut-oil "torch" which the locals would have used during fishing at night. Suluan, therefore, means torch-bearing people in reference to the local fishermen.

During World War II, Suluan was among the first Philippine islands liberated from the Japanese. On October 17, 1944, the 6th Ranger Battalion landed on Dinagat, Homonhon and Suluan, securing the entrance to Leyte Gulf for General Douglas MacArthur's forces. The main landings on Leyte followed three days later.

Administratively, the island was part of the undivided province of Samar until Republic Act No. 4221 divided Samar into three provinces in 1965. Since Homonhon is part of Guiuan, it was officially incorporated into the new province of Eastern Samar.

== Super Typhoon ==
Eastern Samar tends to be battered by tropical storms during Pacific typhoon season. Most times, 90% of a storm landfall is likely to be Suluan Island. On November 8, 2013, Suluan Island was the first victim of the Typhoon Haiyan (Super Typhoon Yolanda) before navigating to Guiuan which had a tremendous impact not only on the island's economy but also to the people's lives. International organizations created an overwhelming drive to help rehabilitate the people and their livelihood.
