= Calicoan Island =

Island in the Philippines

Calicoan
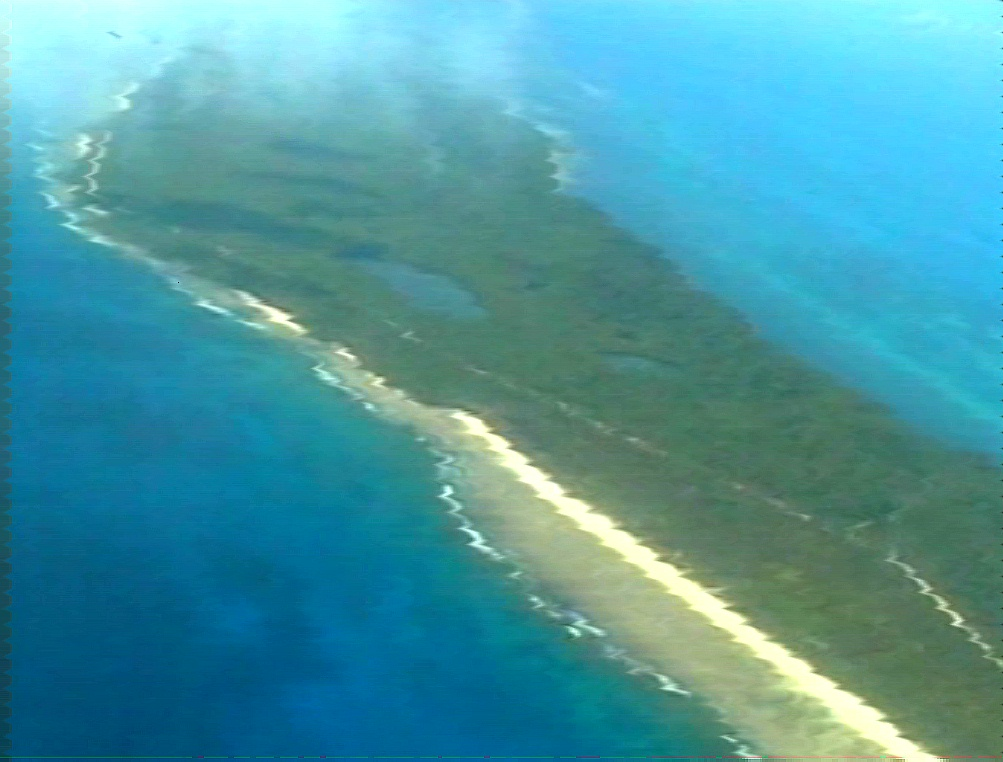
- Calicoan Island

- Location within Philippines

Geography
- Coordinates: 10°59′2″N 125°48′25″E
- Adjacent to: Leyte Gulf; Philippine Sea

Administration
- Philippines
- Region: Eastern Visayas
- Province: Eastern Samar
- Municipality: Guiuan

Calicoan is an island east of Leyte Gulf, off the southeastern point of Samar in the Philippines. It is one of the islands that are part of the municipality of Guiuan, in the province of Eastern Samar. The island can be reached from Tacloban by a three-hour bus ride. It is dubbed as the Surfing Capital of the Visayas.

== Geography ==
Calicoan Island has white sand beaches with rocky bottoms. In the middle of the island are six lagoons ringed by forest, the largest being 30 hectares (74 acres) in size. At the cliff side margin of Calicoan's forests are dozens of caves, including Linao Cave. On the northern tip of Calicoan are wetlands inhabited by fish, shrimp, and crabs.

The surrounding waters support several marine-based industries such as fish farming, seaweed farming, and pearl farming.

Calicoan holds a strategic location as it is situated between Guiuan and Sulangan in Eastern Samar, making it a natural stopping point for travelers moving between these two places.

== Attractions ==
The island's landscape is noted for its pristine beaches and lush greenery.

== Typhoon Haiyan ==
During the landfall of Typhoon Haiyan (Super Typhoon Yolanda) on 7 November 2013, large sections of the eastern coast of the island were seriously damaged.

== Surfing Competition ==
Owing to its popularity as the Surfing Capital of the Visayas, the National Surfing Competition, the Pilipinas Surfing Competition was held from 15–21 September 2023 at Calicoan Island. The event attracted athletes from across the country.
