= Homonhon =

Island in Eastern Samar, Philippines

Nickname: Magellan's First Landing Site
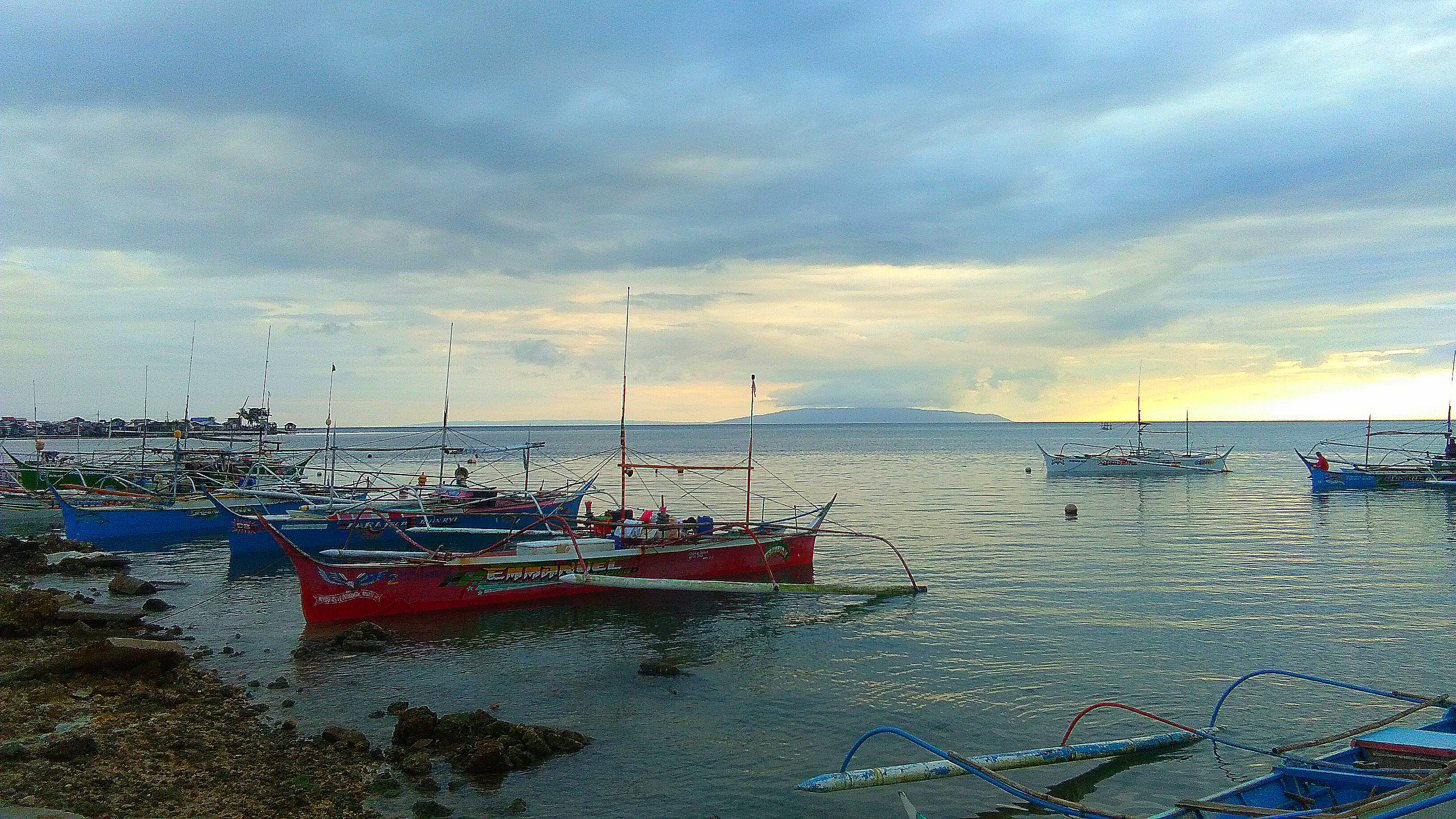
- Homonhon Island, Guiuan, Eastern Samar at sunset (view southwest from Guiuan Integrated Transport Terminal)

- Location within Visayas Location within Philippines

Geography
- Coordinates: 10°45′20″N 125°44′21″E
- Adjacent to: Leyte Gulf; Philippine Sea
- Area: 105.2 km^{2} (40.6 sq mi)
- Coastline: 57.5 km (35.73 mi)
- Highest elevation: 1,227 ft (374 m)
- Highest point: Homonhon Peak

Administration
- Philippines
- Region: Eastern Visayas
- Province: Eastern Samar
- Municipality: Guiuan
- Largest settlement: Casuguran (pop. 1,032)

Demographics
- Population: 4,722 (2024)
- Pop. density: 41.9/km^{2} (108.5/sq mi)

Homonhon Island is an island in the province of Eastern Samar, Philippines, on the east side of Leyte Gulf. The 20-kilometer-long (12 mi) island is part of the municipality of Guiuan, encompassing eight barangays: Bitaugan, Cagusu-an, Canawayon, Casuguran, Culasi, Habag, Inapulangan, and Pagbabangnan.

Mantoconan, an islet just off the northwest corner of Homonhon, is also part of the approximately 7,500 islands comprising the Philippine Archipelago. The island is one of the early Pacific contact sites between the East and the West.

== History ==
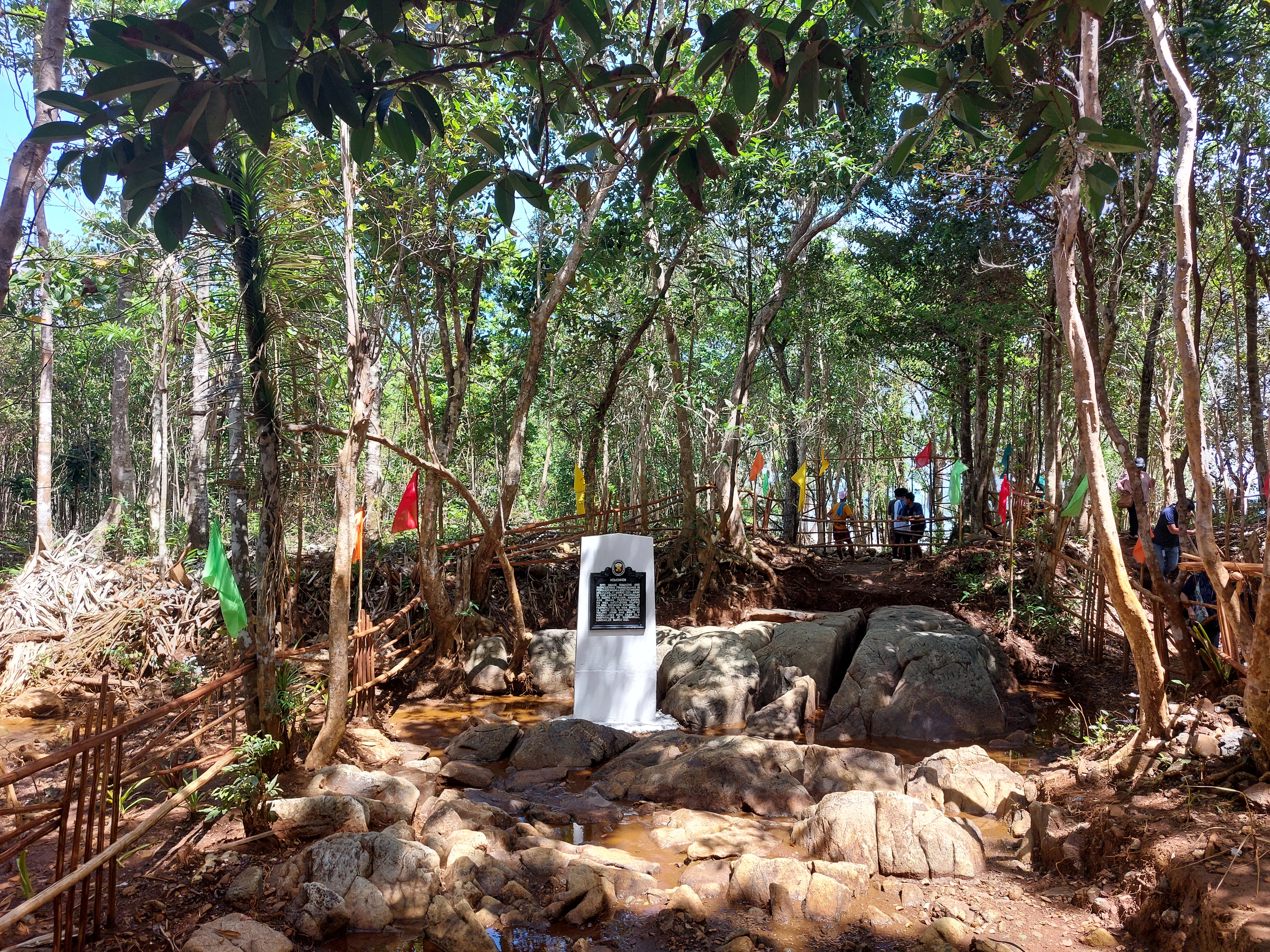
A historical marker in Homonhon marking the site where Ferdinand Magellan's expedition landed in 1521

During the first circumnavigation of the globe, Ferdinand Magellan's three surviving vessels passed the Marianas, but did not land, even though he was out of food after crossing the Pacific Ocean. Yet he landed on the island of Homonhon on March 16, 1521. Despite Homonhon being uninhabited at that time, he was detected by the fishing boats of nearby local settlements in Suluan. The local leaders arrived in more boats, receiving him warmly and trading food and supplies with Magellan's crew. Magellan later left for Limasawa Island.

Up to the early Spanish period, Ibabaonon (bygone term for Bisaya of the eastern and northern Samar coast) revered the island as the sacred residence of Makapatag, the male aspect of the supreme diwata Malaon.

Administratively, the island was part of the undivided province of Samar until Republic Act No. 4221 divided Samar into three provinces in 1965. Since Homonhon is part of Guiuan, it was officially incorporated into the new province of Eastern Samar.

== Barangays ==
List of Barangays in Homonhon island by population (2020 census)

| Barangay | Population |
|---|---|
| Bitaugan | 445 |
| Cagusu-an | 707 |
| Canawayon | 427 |
| Casuguran | 964 |
| Culasi | 446 |
| Habag | 317 |
| Inapulagan | 548 |
| Pagbabangnan | 550 |
| Total | 4,413 |

== Economy ==
The island hosts four large-scale mining operations that are involved in extracting nickel and chromite since the 1980s.
