= Tubabao =

Island in Guiuan, Samar Province, Philippines

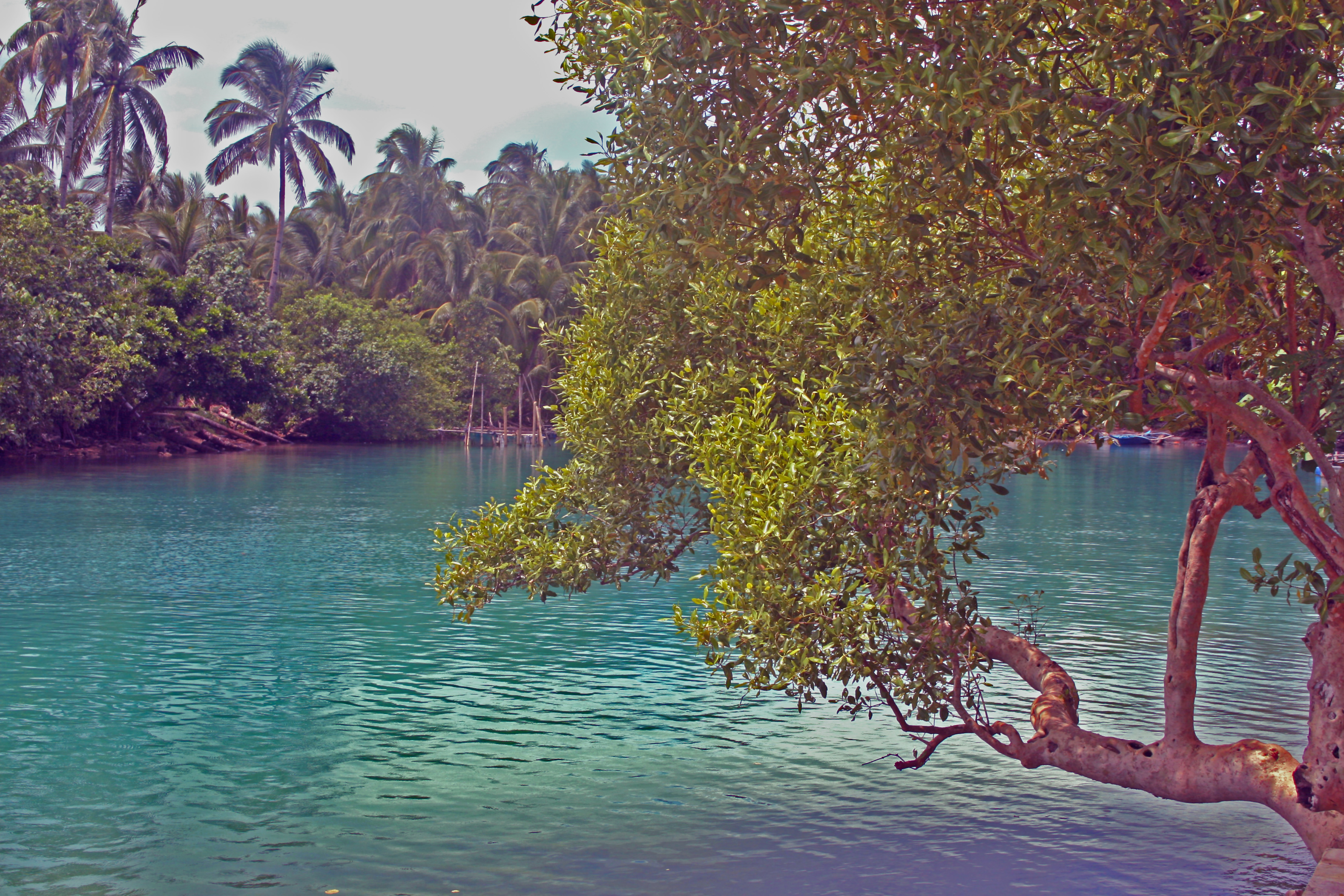
- Small lagoon on Tubabao Island

- Location within Philippines

Geography
- Coordinates: 11.045°N 125.696°E
- Adjacent to: Philippine Sea

Administration
- Philippines
- Region: Eastern Visayas
- Province: Eastern Samar
- Municipality: Guiuan

Tubabao is an island off the southeastern point of Samar. It is one of the islands comprising the town of Guiuan in the province of Eastern Samar, in east central Philippines. The island is located close to the town center.

During World War II, the island, then under the undivided province of Samar, was part of Leyte-Samar Naval Base, which was utilized by the U.S. Navy.

== Refugees from Russia ==
Tubabao was used by the International Refugee Organization (IRO) in 1949 and 1950 to provide a temporary refuge for 6,000 Russian refugees escaping from China.

The Russians were survivors of the October Revolution and Russian Civil War, when the Russian monarchy was overthrown by the Bolsheviks. Some Russians managed to escape and took refuge in foreign lands.

Many of them moved to China, especially Harbin and Shanghai. Most of these refugees survived the Second World War but the communists took power in China and thus the IRO requested all countries around the world to provide accommodation to the Russians. The Philippines volunteered and offered Tubabao Island.

The Russian refugees later were granted to stay in the United States, Australia, Canada, and South American countries. Most refugees became citizens of the countries in which they settled.
