= Legislative districts of Northern Samar =

Legislative districts of Northern Samar, the Philippines

The legislative districts of Northern Samar are the representations of the province of Northern Samar in the various national legislatures of the Philippines. The province is currently represented in the lower house of the Congress of the Philippines through its first and second congressional districts.

== History ==
Northern Samar was represented as part of the first district of Samar until 1967, and of Region VIII from 1978 to 1984. From 1984 to 1986 it elected two assemblymen at-large. In 1986 it was redistricted into two legislative districts.

== 1st District ==
- Municipalities: Allen, Biri, Bobon, Capul, Catarman, Lavezares, Lope de Vega, Mondragon, Rosario, San Antonio, San Isidro, San Jose, San Vicente, Victoria
- Population (2015): 336,265

Period	Representative
8th Congress; 1987–1992	Raul A. Daza
9th Congress; 1992–1995	Raul A. Daza
10th Congress; 1995–1998	Raul A. Daza
11th Congress; 1998–2001	Harlin C. Abayon
12th Congress; 2001–2004	Harlin C. Abayon
13th Congress; 2004–2007	Harlin C. Abayon
14th Congress; 2007–2010	Paul R. Daza
15th Congress; 2010–2013	Raul A. Daza
16th Congress; 2013–2016	Harlin C. Abayon (Note: Abayon was disqualified by the House of Representatives Electoral Tribunal due to electoral fraud and was replaced by his opponent, Daza on May 23, 2016. The Supreme Court reversed the HRET decision to reinstate Abayon but the House of Representatives did not implement it.)
16th Congress; 2013–2016	Raul A. Daza
17th Congress; 2016–2019	Raul A. Daza
18th Congress; 2019–2022	Paul R. Daza
19th Congress; 2022–2025	Paul R. Daza
20th Congress; 2025–2028	Niko Raul Daza

== 2nd District ==
- Municipalities: Catubig, Gamay, Laoang, Lapinig, Las Navas, Mapanas, Palapag, Pambujan, San Roque, Silvino Lobos
- Population (2015): 296,114

Period	Representative
8th Congress; 1987–1992	Jose L. Ong, Jr.
9th Congress; 1992–1995	Wilmar P. Lucero
10th Congress; 1995–1998	Wilmar P. Lucero
11th Congress; 1998–2001	Romualdo T. Vicencio (Note: Died on July 26, 2006; seat remained vacant until the end of 13th Congress.)
12th Congress; 2001–2004	Romualdo T. Vicencio
13th Congress; 2004–2007	Romualdo T. Vicencio
13th Congress; 2004–2007	vacant
14th Congress; 2007–2010	Emil L. Ong
15th Congress; 2010–2013	Emil L. Ong
16th Congress; 2013–2016	Emil L. Ong
17th Congress; 2016–2019	Edwin C. Ongchuan
18th Congress; 2019–2022	Jose L. Ong, Jr.
19th Congress; 2022–2025	Harris Christopher M. Ongchuan
20th Congress; 2025–2028	Edwin C. Ongchuan

== Lone District (defunct) ==
Period	Representative
6th Congress; 1965–1969	see 1st District of Samar
6th Congress; 1965–1969	Eusebio Moore (Note: Elected as the first official representative of the lone district of Northern Samar through a special election held on November 14, 1967 with only areas under the jurisdiction of the new province voting.)
7th Congress; 1969–1972	Raul A. Daza

== At-large (defunct) ==
Period	Representative
Regular Batasang Pambansa; 1984–1986	Edilberto A. Del Valle, Sr. (Note: Served also as one of the Regional Assemblymen representing Samar-Leyte Region to the Interim Batasang Pambansa. (1978–1984))

== See also ==
- Legislative districts of Samar
