= N670 highway =

National highway in Samar, Philippines

Route 670

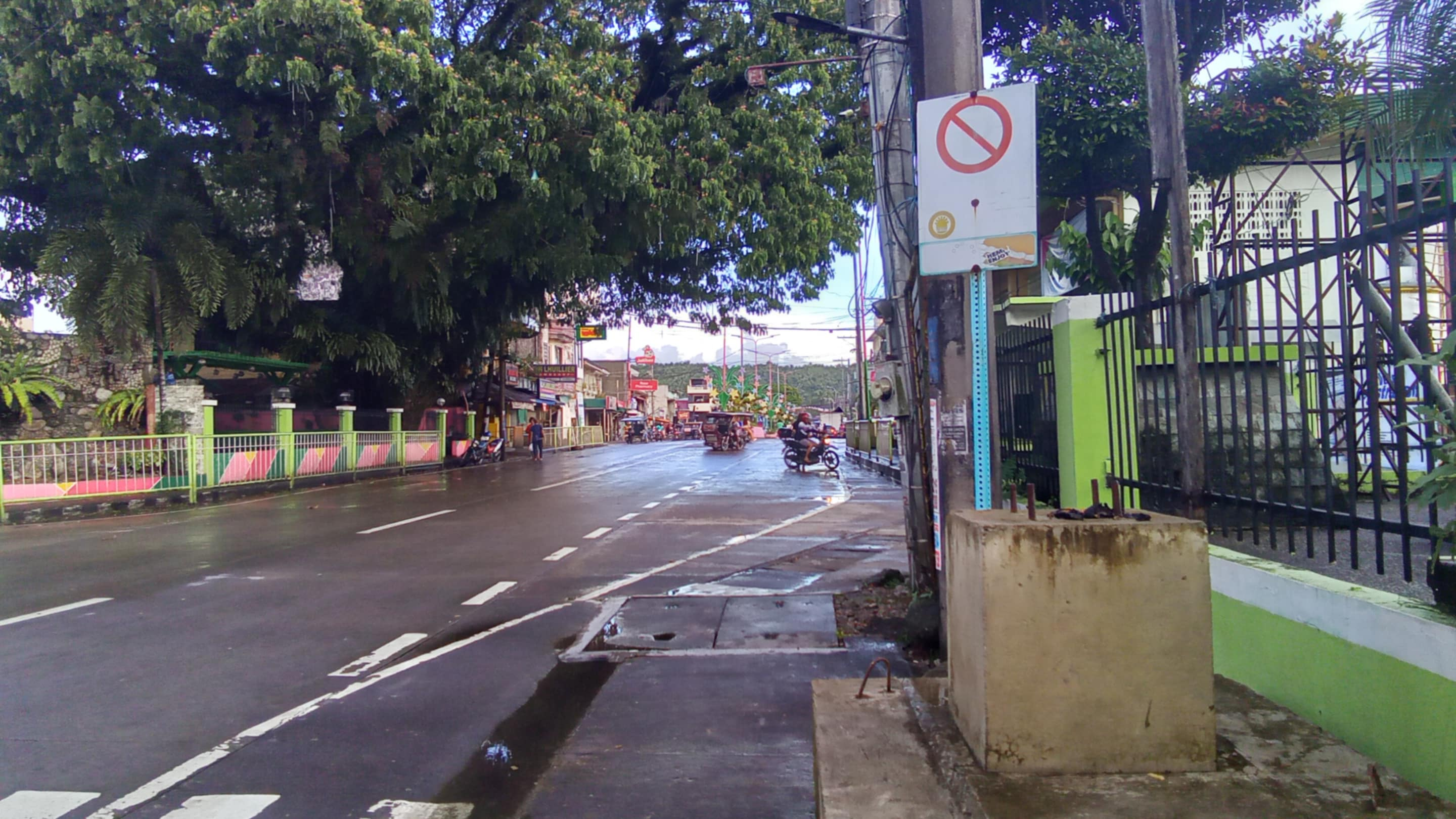
- View of the N670 highway in the Wright-Taft-Borongan segment in the poblacion of Borongan.

Major junctions
- North end: N1 (Maharlika Highway) in Allen, Northern Samar
- N672 (Catarman-Calbayog Road) in Catarman, Northern Samar; N674 (Wright-Taft Road) in Taft, Eastern Samar; N676 (Borongan-Guiuan Road) in Quinapondan, Eastern Samar
- South end: N1 (Maharlika Highway) in Basey, Samar

Location
- Country: Philippines
- Provinces: Northern Samar; Eastern Samar; Samar
- Towns: Allen; Lavezares; Rosario; San Jose; Bobon; Catarman; Mondragon; San Roque; Pambujan; Laoang; Palapag; Mapanas; Gamay; Lapinig; Arteche; San Policarpo; Oras; Dolores; Can-avid; Taft; Sulat; San Julian; Borongan; Maydolong; Llorente; Hernani; General MacArthur; Quinapondan; Giporlos; Balangiga; Lawaan; Marabut; Basey

Highway system
- Roads in the Philippines; Highways; Expressways; List

National Highway 670 is a national highway in the Philippine highway network. This highway traverses the island of Samar, including the provinces of Northern Samar, Eastern Samar, and Samar. It starts in Allen, Northern Samar, from the Pan-Philippine Highway and travels east to Northern Samar. It then turns south to Eastern Samar, and west for the province of Samar.

The first portion of the highway was created in 1983 with the construction of the Catarman-Laoang Road. Since then, multiple portions of the highway have been built, with most of them being created from the 1980s to the 2000s. The last portion of the highway to be built was the San Policarpo-Arteche-Lapinig Road, created in 2009. Since the full completion of the highway, numerous typhoons have closed portions of the highway.

== Route description ==
The highway begins from an intersection in the Port of Allen. The section is labeled the Allen-Catarman Road. It has an intersection with the Allen Old Road as it passes through the towns of Lavezares and Rosario. It crosses Bobon, entering the municipality of Catarman, having an intersection with the Catarman-Calbayog Road or National Highway 672. It intersects with both of the local diversion roads in Catarman. It transmutes into the Catarman-Laoang Road. It progresses the town of Mondragon before switching to the second Department of Public Works and Highways (DPWH) district in Northern Samar. It elapses through the towns of San Roque by intersecting with the town's old road and Pambujan. It then intersects with the Rawis-Catubig Road while, shortly after, having a ferry crossing to Laoang, after which it continues as the Laoang–Calomotan Road, crossing through Laoang Island. After reaching Calomotan over a distance of 6.487 kilometres (4.031 miles), a boat ride connects the road to the Barangay of Pangpang before adjusting into the Pangpang-Palapag-Mapanas-Gamay-Lapinig Roa, nicknamed the PAMAGALA Road. The road passes through the towns of Palapag while avoiding the poblacion, Mapanas, Gamay, and eventually Lapinig.

The road segment is now named the Jct Taft-Oras-San Policarpo-Arteche Road. It passes through the towns of Arteche, San Policarpo, Oras, Dolores, and Can-Avid over a distance of 81 km (50 mi). It trenches the Oras Bridge, with a length of 540 metres (1,770 feet), the Dolores Bridge, with a length of 322 m (1,056 ft), and the Can-Avid Bridge with a length of 310 m (1,020 ft). It has an intersection with the Wright–Taft Road in Taft, naming the segment the Wright-Taft-Borongan Road. The road runs through the towns of Sulat and San Julian. It passes the Sulat Bridge, with a length of 138 m (453 ft) and the Taft Bridge with a length of 137 m (449 ft). In Borongan, the road segment transmutes into the Borongan-Guiuan Road. It passes through the towns of Maydolong, Hernani, General MacArthur, and eventually Quinapondan, where the segment is named the Jct Buenavista-Lawaan-Marabut Road in an intersection with a portion of the Borongan-Guiuan Road. It passes through the towns of Giporlos, Balangiga, and Lawaan before entering the province of Samar.

Upon entering Samar, the road diverts into the Basey-Marabut-Pinamitinan Road. It passes through the town of Marabut, curving over the coastline and turning north. It then crosses Basey while splitting into two roads: the Dolongan-Basey Road, which leads northern, and the San Juanico-Basey-Sohoton Road, which goes straight, the main road leading to Tacloban. Both of them intersect with the Maharlika Highway, leading up to the San Juanico Bridge.

== History ==
The creation of the Catarman-Laoang Road was dated back to 1983 in a development report by the Government of the Philippines. The Catarman-Allen Road was deemed 90 percent complete on June 29, 1987, with the help of the Australian Government. In June 2000, the South Samar Coastal Road, a part of the highway connecting Samar and Eastern Samar was opened. In the early 2000s, the Taft-Guiuan Highway was constructed. In November 2006, then-President Gloria Macapagal Arroyo ordered the release of funds for the Northern Samar to Eastern Samar highway portion. Within 2008, repairs of the PAMAGALA Road have been made. The San Policarpo-Arteche-Lapinig Road was created in 2009.

In January 2019, the Allen-Catarman road was damaged by Tropical Depression Usman. In November 2022, the Allen-Catarman road was damaged again from Tropical Storm Nalgae, locally named Paeng on a cost of 20 million pesos. In November 2023, seven bridges from the highway were damaged by flooding from a shear line. Five of the damaged bridges were located in the Allen-Catarman Road while two of the bridges were located in the Catarman-Laoang road. On October 23, 2024, the northern portion of the road was considered impassable because of heavy winds from Tropical Storm Trami, locally named Kristine.

== Major intersections ==
Intersections are numbered by kilometer post, with Rizal Park in Manila designated as kilometer zero.

Province	City/Municipality	km	mi	Destinations	Notes
Northern Samar	Allen	697	433	N1	
Northern Samar	Catarman	743	462	N672	
Eastern Samar	Taft	891	554	N674	
Eastern Samar	Quinapondan	996	619	N676	
Samar	Santa Rita	896	557	N1	
1.000 mi = 1.609 km; 1.000 km = 0.621 mi
