= Laoang =

Municipality in Northern Samar, Philippines

- Municipality
- Municipality of Laoang
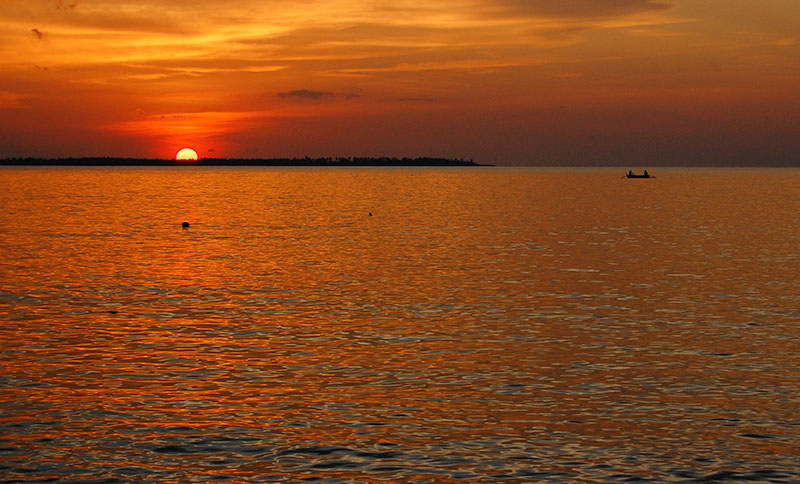
- Sunset at Laoang shoreline

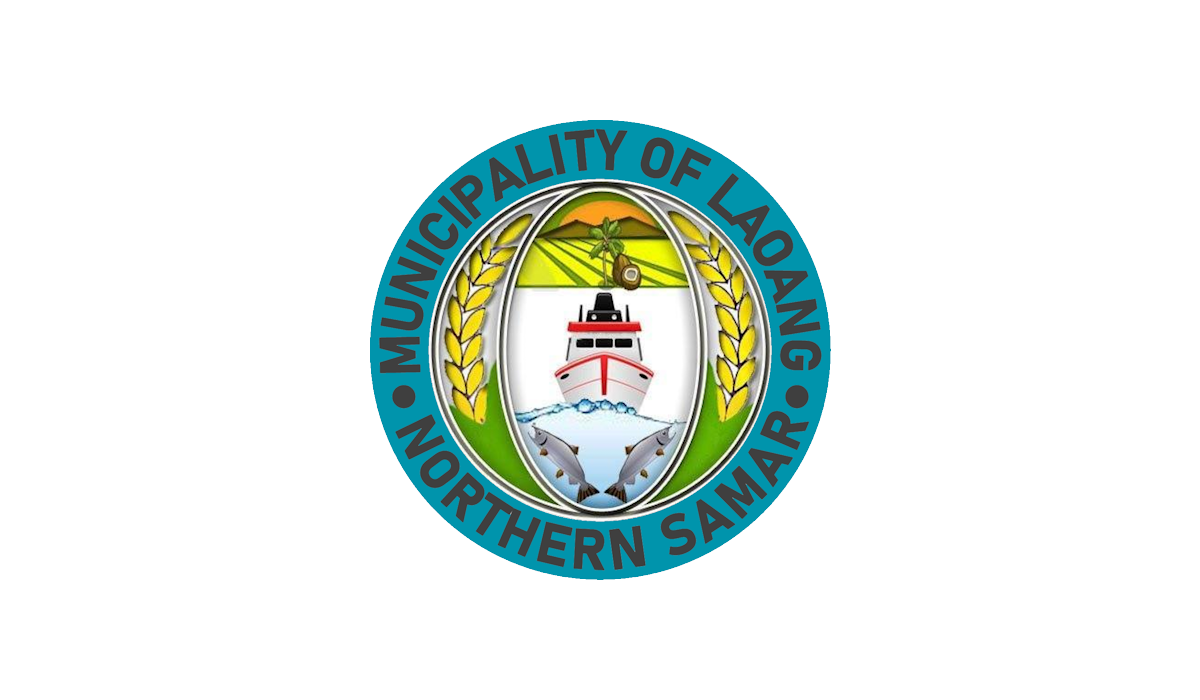
- Flag

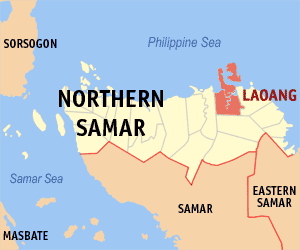
- Map of Northern Samar with Laoang highlighted
- Interactive map of Laoang
- Location within the Philippines
- Coordinates: 12°34′N 125°01′E
- Country: Philippines
- Region: Eastern Visayas
- Province: Northern Samar
- District: 2nd district
- Founded: 1768
- Barangays: 56 (see Barangays)

Government
  - Type: Sangguniang Bayan
  - Mayor: Charlene L. Ongchuan
  - Vice Mayor: Luke Jensen Detera
  - Representative: Edwin Marino Ongchuan
  - Councilors: List: • Felix D. Tan; • Democrito V. Aquino; • Luke Jensen R. Detera; • Fred P. Deananeas; • Edmundo R. Echano; • Alfredo L. Baluyot; • Cleto T. Pinca; • Lemuel O. Irinco; DILG Masterlist of Officials
  - Electorate: 37,615 voters (2025)

Area
  - Total: 246.94 km^{2} (95.34 sq mi)
- Elevation: 7.0 m (23.0 ft)
- Highest elevation: 69 m (226 ft)
- Lowest elevation: 0 m (0 ft)

Population (2024 census)
  - Total: 60,980
  - Density: 246.9/km^{2} (639.6/sq mi)
  - Households: 13,339
- Demonym: Laoangnon

Economy
  - Income class: 1st municipal income class
  - Poverty incidence: 29.05% (2023)
  - Revenue: ₱ 279.8 million (2024)
  - Assets: ₱ 914.7 million (2024)
  - Expenditure: ₱ 253.1 million (2024)
  - Liabilities: ₱ 227.2 million (2024)

Service provider
  - Electricity: Northern Samar Electric Cooperative (NORSAMELCO)
- Time zone: UTC+8 (PST)
- ZIP code: 6411
- PSGC: 0804808000
- IDD : area code: +63 (0)55
- Native languages: Waray; Tagalog

Laoang, officially the Municipality of Laoang (Waray: Bungto han Laoang; Tagalog: Bayan ng Laoang), is a municipality in the province of Northern Samar, Philippines. According to the 2024 census, it has a population of 60,980 people.

It is the economic, educational, socio-cultural and government center of the 2nd district of the province.

== History ==
=== Pre-Spanish Time ===
Written by: Rev.Msgr. Gaspar D. Balerite, H.P.S.Th.D., Vicar General-Diocese of Catarman

In the pre-Hispanic times, the poblacion of Laoang was a settlement called Makarato while the whole island was called Lawang which later on evolved into Laoang. According to Fr. Ignatius Alzina in his book Historia de las Islas y Indios de Bisayas, the settlement was ruled by a monarch called Dato Karagrag, whose consort Bingi had an irresistible beauty that captivated other neighboring kings, especially the dato from Albay. (Fr. Alzina lived as missionary in Samar and Leyte for 38 years, from 1634 to 1674, working mostly in Palapag.) Contrary to the popular legend that the word “Laoang” is an evolution of the word “lawag”, Laoang as “Lawang”, which according to Dr. Rolando Borrinaga, is an Austronesian word which means portal of entry and exit, which may imply that some settlements to Austronesian islands may have sailed from Lawang, later on called as Lawan.

Then, describing the place of the settlement, Fr. Alzina in his visit to the place in 1640 says, “On the opposite side of Rawis, on the Lawang Island, which is a sandbar there is a solid ridge of rock. It is fashioned by nature itself and it is so steep that it looks like a façade of a wall… It was a natural fortification, due to its great height of massive rock; it was also secured as if by a moat which encircled its three sides. The fourth side was blocked by a palisade of strong logs. Then too, nature also formed on one side of this rock something like a small cove with its little beach.”

In the local epic called siday entitled Bingi of Lawan as written in the article of Scott, Lawan is a prosperous settlement in Samar.

=== Christianization (Spanish Era) ===
The Christianisation of Laoang was as early as the evangelisation of the whole island, and began when Jesuit missionaries arrived in Tinago (now Dapdap in Tarangnan, Samar), on October 15, 1596. Soon after, the missionaries traversed the north-west of the island over the Gandara River and reached Ibabao in the north-east. They founded a mission station in Catubig (originally in Binongtoan, Las Navas). In 1605 the Catubig mission established other mission stations: in Rawis, Batac (Batag Island), Laoang, and Palapag. In 1606, the center of the Ibabao mission was moved from Catubig to Palapag. The mission center of Palapag was called Residencia de Cabo del Espritu Santo. In the 1650s Laoang became one of ten mission-stations covered by the Palapag Residencia which comprised stations from Bobon to Borongan.

On February 27, 1767, Charles III of Spain expelled the Society of Jesus from the Spanish Empire and all its territories including the Philippines. The order then left the colony in batches between August 1769 and January 1770, and were replaced by the Franciscans who arrived in Catbalogan on September 25, 1768. Rev. José Anda, SJ was the last Jesuit to minister in Laoang and Rev. Antonio Toledo, OFM took over administration of Laoang, with the titular St. Michael the Archangel upon his arrival in November 1768. In the same year, Pambujan was founded as a visita of Laoang (visita was the 17th-century ecclesiastical term for a village with a non-resident priest, similar to chapelries in Britain).

To prevent raids by Moro invaders, the Governor-General proposed in 1814 the construction of defensive plans. Rev. José Mata, parish priest of both Laoang and Palapag, was cited for being the first to have launched a construction of muralla in Laoang at his own expense. To ease the constant shuttling of the parish priest from Palapag to Laoang, the townspeople of Laoang petitioned for a permanent minister. During the tenure of Rev. Manuel Lozano in the 1840s, an earthquake damaged the parish church, which was renovated between 1848 and 1852 by Rev Sebastian Almonacid. He had the attached rectory fixed as well, and he directed the construction of the tribunal and schoolhouse using stone and wood.

On August 4, 1863, Pambujan seceded from Laoang. In 1869 a great fire broke out in the town and besides many other buildings, it consumed the entire roof and wooden materials of the church, belfry and convent. Five years later the church complex was reconstructed. By 1890, Laoang had a population of 5,384 in the población and a total of 2,754 in four visitas and eight barrios. The last Spanish parish priest of Laoang was Rev. Telesforo Acereda, after which the entire Philippine Islands were ceded by Spain to the United States of America in 1898.

In 1930s, a controversy broke out between the Catholic Church and civil authorities (by then separated by the American colonial government) when an organisation called "Dugo ni Rizal" insisted on erecting a statue of Dr. José Rizal on the plaza, land which the Church claimed. The case was brought to the court with Msgr. Sofronio Hacbang, Bishop of Samar and Leyte, acting as applicant-appellant. The Supreme Court en banc issued a decision on July 31, 1935, which confirmed that the lots presently occupied by the church, convent, auditorium, and plaza were ecclesiastical property. The presence of José Rizal's statue caused the plaza to be erroneously called “Plaza Rizal” for years, even though it had been called Plaza María since Spanish times. It is now called “Plaza Inmaculada Concepción” in honour of the Immaculate Conception, whose statue stands on the square's western side. In the 1970s, recognising the Church's ownership of the plaza, the civil government moved the statue of Rizal from the centre of the square to its present location on the eastern side.

When the Diocese of Catarman was formally created on March 11, 1975, Laoang became the center of the Vicariate of St. Thérèse of Child Jesus which comprised the other towns of Palapag, Catubig, Las Navas, Pambujan, and San Roque. When the diocese celebrated its 25th anniversary, two mission centers were created: Salvacion which covered all the barrios of Batag Island including Barangay Cahayagan; and Rawis which comprised all the surrounding barangays bordering on barrios on the right banks of the river going to Catubig.

The religiosity of Laoang is graced when one of its parish priests was proclaimed “Blessed” by Pope Benedict XVI on October 12, 2007. He was Fr. Angel Ranera, OFM, the parish priest of Laoang from 1924 till his return to Spain in 1929. [During the Spanish Civil War, he faced the firing squad of the rebels with two other priests on August 16, 1936.] The first council of the Knights of Columbus in Northern Samar was installed in Laoang in 1949, the Msgr. Diasnes Council. Since 1957 only in Laoang that a communitarian devotion to Mary, Barangay sang Birhen, is still being practiced without interruption. Immediately after the creation of the Diocese of Catarman one of the initial acts of the first diocesan bishop, Angel T. Hobayon, was to petition the Pope to grant a papal honor to the parish priest of Laoang with the title “Domestic Prelate,” to Potenciano Ortega. When the North of Samar celebrated its 400th year of Christianity, the Bishop again petitioned the Pope to grand Papal Honors with the title “Honorary Prelates” to three priests, two of them from Laoang: Msgr. Gaspar Balerite and Msgr. Romeo Infante. Of all the parishes in the whole island of Samar, Laoang has the most number of native priests: as of this writing, 37 priests in all.

== Geography ==
The municipality lies on the eastern side of the province. Bordering Pambujan in the west, Palapag facing east and the municipality of Catubig as its southern neighbor while the Philippine Sea stretches in the north.

Laoang is geographically divided into three distinct areas. The first is the lowlands of the mainland of Samar Island along the mouth of the Catubig River. The second is Laoang Island itself where the poblacion is situated, and the third is the Batag Island which forms as a natural barrier from the waters of the Pacific Ocean.

=== Climate ===
Climate data for Laoang, Northern Samar
| Month | Jan | Feb | Mar | Apr | May | Jun | Jul | Aug | Sep | Oct | Nov | Dec | Year |
|---|---|---|---|---|---|---|---|---|---|---|---|---|---|
| Mean daily maximum °C (°F) | 27 (81) | 27 (81) | 28 (82) | 29 (84) | 30 (86) | 30 (86) | 30 (86) | 30 (86) | 29 (84) | 29 (84) | 28 (82) | 27 (81) | 29 (84) |
| Mean daily minimum °C (°F) | 23 (73) | 22 (72) | 22 (72) | 23 (73) | 24 (75) | 24 (75) | 24 (75) | 24 (75) | 24 (75) | 24 (75) | 24 (75) | 23 (73) | 23 (74) |
| Average precipitation mm (inches) | 105 (4.1) | 67 (2.6) | 65 (2.6) | 53 (2.1) | 86 (3.4) | 129 (5.1) | 135 (5.3) | 113 (4.4) | 131 (5.2) | 163 (6.4) | 167 (6.6) | 162 (6.4) | 1,376 (54.2) |
| Average rainy days | 17.6 | 13.2 | 15.5 | 14.9 | 19.6 | 24.3 | 26.6 | 25.4 | 24.9 | 25.4 | 22.9 | 20.9 | 251.2 |
Source: Meteoblue

=== Barangays ===
Laoang is politically subdivided into 56 barangays. Each barangay consists of puroks and some have sitios.

- Abaton
- Aguadahan
- Aroganga
- Atipolo
- Bawang
- Baybay (Poblacion)
- Binatiklan
- Bobolosan
- Bongliw
- Burabud (San Isidro)
- Cabadiangan
- Cabagngan
- Cabago-an
- Cabulaloan
- Cagaasan
- Cagdara-o
- Cahayagan
- Calomotan
- Candawid
- Cangcahipos
- Canyomanao
- Catigbian
- E. J. Dulay
- G. B. Tan
- Gibatangan
- Guilaoangi (Poblacion)
- Inamlan (Gapas-gapas)
- La Perla
- Langob
- Lawaan
- Little Venice (Poblacion)
- Magsaysay
- Marubay
- Mualbual
- Napotiocan (Salvacion)
- Oleras
- Onay (Doña Luisa)
- Palmera
- Pangdan
- Rawis (Agno)
- Rombang
- San Antonio (Son-og)
- San Miguel Heights (Poblacion)
- Sangcol
- Sibunot
- Simora
- Santo Niño (Calintaan) Pob.
- Suba
- Tan-awan
- Tarusan
- Tinoblan
- Tumaguingting (Poblacion)
- Vigo
- Yabyaban (San Vicente)
- Yapas
- Talisay

== Demographics ==
Population census of Laoang
| Year | Pop. | ±% p.a. |
|---|---|---|
| 1903 | 8,636 | — |
| 1918 | 11,508 | +1.93% |
| 1939 | 19,736 | +2.60% |
| 1948 | 29,748 | +4.66% |
| 1960 | 41,158 | +2.74% |
| 1970 | 37,382 | −0.96% |
| 1975 | 42,498 | +2.61% |
| 1980 | 46,545 | +1.84% |
| 1990 | 42,048 | −1.01% |
| 1995 | 47,438 | +2.29% |
| 2000 | 54,523 | +3.03% |
| 2007 | 56,196 | +0.42% |
| 2010 | 58,037 | +1.18% |
| 2015 | 61,359 | +1.07% |
| 2020 | 60,607 | −0.26% |
| 2024 | 60,980 | +0.15% |
Source: Philippine Statistics Authority

=== Religion ===
Majority of the populace are Roman Catholic and is very religious. It has the most number (37) of ordained presbyters (including five monsignors) of the Roman Catholic Church in the whole region with the exception of the municipality of Villareal, Samar.

== Economy ==
Laoang, a first-class municipality in the province of Northern Samar, is one of the more economically active localities in Eastern Visayas (Region VIII). With a population of over 61,000 as of the 2020 census and growing steadily, Laoang plays a significant role in the province’s overall economic landscape. Despite challenges such as frequent typhoons and underdeveloped infrastructure in certain areas, the municipality shows potential for economic growth, especially in agriculture, fisheries, and emerging tourism.

The municipality's classification as a first-class municipality indicates that it has an average annual income of ₱55 million or more, according to the Department of Finance’s Bureau of Local Government Finance (BLGF).

== Primary Economic Sectors ==
=== Agriculture ===
Agriculture remains the backbone of Laoang’s economy. The majority of residents are engaged in farming, with rice and coconut (especially copra production) as the main crops. The municipality also produces root crops like cassava and camote, along with fruits such as bananas. The presence of arable land and favorable climate conditions support year-round agricultural activity.

=== Fisheries ===
Fisheries are another vital component of Laoang’s economy, particularly in its coastal and island barangays. Local communities depend on fishing for both subsistence and income. Common products include fish, crabs, shrimp, and seaweed, with small-scale seaweed farming becoming increasingly popular.

=== Commerce and Trade ===
While still developing, local commerce and trade are growing steadily. Laoang has an active market center in the poblacion, where agricultural and fishery products are traded. Small-scale retail businesses and service-oriented enterprises are becoming more visible. Additionally, overseas Filipino workers (OFWs) contribute to the local economy through remittances, which support household consumption and small business development.

== Emerging Sectors ==
=== Tourism Potential ===
Tourism is an emerging sector in Laoang’s economy. The municipality boasts a range of natural and historical attractions, including the historic Laoang Church, scenic beaches, and opportunities for island hopping. Although tourism currently contributes modestly to local income, it has significant potential for growth, particularly in eco-tourism and cultural tourism.

== Economic Indicators and Development Challenges ==
=== Poverty and Income ===
According to the Philippine Statistics Authority (PSA), the poverty incidence in Northern Samar was approximately 24.35% in 2021. While specific data for Laoang is not available, it is likely to have a slightly lower poverty incidence due to its higher income classification and more developed local economy.

Despite this, poverty remains a concern, especially in remote and vulnerable barangays. Many residents rely on seasonal income and are susceptible to economic shocks caused by natural disasters.

Poverty incidence of Laoang (%)

Source: Philippine Statistics Authority

=== Infrastructure and Public Services ===
Infrastructure development in Laoang has improved, with ongoing investments in farm-to-market roads and local health facilities. However, challenges persist in reaching remote and upland communities. Limited industrial activity and gaps in public services hinder faster economic development.

The municipality is also prone to natural disasters, such as typhoons and flooding, which affect livelihoods and infrastructure resilience. Disaster preparedness and recovery programs are thus critical areas of focus for the local government.

== Local Government Initiatives ==
The Municipal Government of Laoang has undertaken several initiatives aimed at strengthening the local economy. These include:

- Supporting agricultural productivity through subsidies and technical assistance
- Promoting livelihood programs and micro-enterprise development
- Improving infrastructure, especially in farming communities
- Exploring tourism development opportunities
- Strengthening disaster risk reduction and management

These efforts align with broader regional development plans initiated by the Eastern Visayas Regional Development Council (RDC VIII) and the National Economic and Development Authority (NEDA).

== Education ==
The municipality boasts for having three elementary school districts (two in the poblacion area), 13 secondary schools including one private-sectarian high school (Colegio de Santa Teresita) and a laboratory high school. The University of Eastern Philippines maintains one satellite branch.

== Culture ==
Several festivities are celebrated throughout the year. In the 4th Sunday of January, they celebrate the feast of Santo Niño or the Child Jesus.

Flores De Mayo, like any other Philippine town, is also done in May and the town's fiesta is on September 28–29 in honor of its patron St. Michael the Archangel.

Its people shares its rich oral/written literature such as surumatanons and is handed down from the earliest inhabitants to the new generation.

Also popular are the kundimans in Waray version, sidays and individual compositions. One of this is the "Laoang Sunset" or "Sidsid San Adlaw Sa Laoang" composed by Bernardino Muncada which portrays the beauty of the town.

== Tourism ==
- Batag Island Lighthouse
- Onay Beach
- Kalakhaan Islet
- St. Michael the Archangel Parish
- Pasyao Cliff
- Almuraya Fortress
- Grand Canyon

== Notable personalities ==
- Oskar Muncada Monje - Waray-language poet, playwright, and songwriter
- Angel Aquino - Filipino fashion model, TV host, and FAMAS and Gawad Urian Award-nominated film and TV actress
- Alicia Lipata - vlogger
- Errol "Budoy" Marabiles - Filipino reggae musician, songwriter and TV host; vocalist of the reggae band Junior Kilat
- Pooh - Filipino actor, comedian, impersonator, singer, and TV host.
- Aloy Adlawan - Multi-awarded Filipino filmmaker, writer, producer, director, and composer
