= Samar Pacific Coastal Road =

Road spanning Catubig and Palapag

Route information
- Length: 11.607 km (7.212 mi)
- Existed: 2022–present

Location
- Country: Philippines
- Provinces: Northern Samar
- Towns: Catubig and Palapag

Highway system
- Roads in the Philippines; Highways; Expressways; List

The Samar Pacific Coastal Road is a road spanning Catubig and Palapag.

== History ==
Inauguration of the road project on 14 July 2023.

The construction of the Samar Pacific Coastal Road began on May 13, 2018. It was funded by the Philippine and the South Korean government, the latter via Eximbank. The road is meant to pass through Laoang, Catubig and Palapag municipalities of Northern Samar which are known as the "Pacific towns" of the province. The road connects the three municipalities to the provincial capital of Catarman. The phase one of the project included three lineal bridges. The road was projected to be completed by 2020.

Numerous typhoons and the COVID-19 pandemic would delay the construction. On June 28, 2022, 8 kilometers (5.0 mi) of the road was opened including the Simora bridge.

The first phase of the Samar Pacific Coastal Road, now 11.607 kilometers (7.212 mi) long would be inaugurated on July 14, 2023 in a ceremony led by President Bongbong Marcos. Phase one is tagged as an infrastructure flagship project (IFP) by the lineal bridges.

The second phase which will extend the road by 15 kilometers (9.3 mi) in Palapag and Laoang would be greenlit within the same month. Korea Eximbank is considering funding the project again for phase two.
