= Northern Samar's 2nd congressional district =

Legislative district of the Philippines

- Constituency for the House of Representatives of the Philippines
- Location of Northern Samar within the Philippines
- Province: Northern Samar
- Region: Eastern Visayas
- Population: 296,114 (2015)
- Electorate: 201,201 (2019)
- Major settlements: 10 LGUs: Municipalities; Catubig; Gamay; Laoang; Lapinig; Las Navas; Mapanas; Palapag; Pambujan; San Roque; Silvino Lobos
- Area: 1,755.47 km^{2} (677.79 sq mi)

Current constituency
- Created: 1987
- Representative: Edwin C. Ongchuan
- Political party: PFP
- Congressional bloc: Majority

Northern Samar's 2nd congressional district is a congressional district in the province of Northern Samar, Philippines. It has been represented in the House of Representatives since 1987. The district covers the province's eastern half which contains the municipalities of Catubig, Gamay, Laoang, Lapinig, Las Navas, Mapanas, Palapag, Pambujan, San Roque and Silvino Lobos. It is currently represented in the 20th Congress by Edwin C. Ongchuan of the Partido Federal ng Pilipinas (PFP).

== Representation history ==
#	Image	Member	Term of office		Congress	Party	Electoral history	Constituent LGUs
#	Image	Member	Start	End	Congress	Party	Electoral history	Constituent LGUs
=== Northern Samar's 2nd district for the House of Representatives of the Philippines ===
District created February 2, 1987 from Northern Samar's at-large district.
1		Jose L. Ong Jr.	June 30, 1987	June 30, 1992	8th	LDP	Elected in 1987.	1987–present Catubig, Gamay, Laoang, Lapinig, Las Navas, Mapanas, Palapag, Pambujan, San Roque, Silvino Lobos
2		Wilmar P. Lucero	June 30, 1992	June 30, 1998	9th	Liberal	Elected in 1992.	1987–present Catubig, Gamay, Laoang, Lapinig, Las Navas, Mapanas, Palapag, Pambujan, San Roque, Silvino Lobos
2		Wilmar P. Lucero	June 30, 1992	June 30, 1998	10th	Liberal	Re-elected in 1995.	1987–present Catubig, Gamay, Laoang, Lapinig, Las Navas, Mapanas, Palapag, Pambujan, San Roque, Silvino Lobos
3		Romualdo T. Vicencio	June 30, 1998	July 26, 2006	11th	Liberal	Elected in 1998.	1987–present Catubig, Gamay, Laoang, Lapinig, Las Navas, Mapanas, Palapag, Pambujan, San Roque, Silvino Lobos
3		Romualdo T. Vicencio	June 30, 1998	July 26, 2006	12th	Lakas	Re-elected in 2001.	1987–present Catubig, Gamay, Laoang, Lapinig, Las Navas, Mapanas, Palapag, Pambujan, San Roque, Silvino Lobos
3		Romualdo T. Vicencio	June 30, 1998	July 26, 2006	13th	Lakas	Re-elected in 2004. Died in office.	1987–present Catubig, Gamay, Laoang, Lapinig, Las Navas, Mapanas, Palapag, Pambujan, San Roque, Silvino Lobos
—	vacant		July 26, 2006	June 30, 2007	13th	–	No special election held to fill vacancy.	1987–present Catubig, Gamay, Laoang, Lapinig, Las Navas, Mapanas, Palapag, Pambujan, San Roque, Silvino Lobos
4		Emil L. Ong	June 30, 2007	June 30, 2016	14th	Lakas	Elected in 2007.	1987–present Catubig, Gamay, Laoang, Lapinig, Las Navas, Mapanas, Palapag, Pambujan, San Roque, Silvino Lobos
4		Emil L. Ong	June 30, 2007	June 30, 2016	15th	NUP	Re-elected in 2010.	1987–present Catubig, Gamay, Laoang, Lapinig, Las Navas, Mapanas, Palapag, Pambujan, San Roque, Silvino Lobos
4		Emil L. Ong	June 30, 2007	June 30, 2016	16th	NUP	Re-elected in 2013.	1987–present Catubig, Gamay, Laoang, Lapinig, Las Navas, Mapanas, Palapag, Pambujan, San Roque, Silvino Lobos
5		Edwin C. Ongchuan	June 30, 2016	June 30, 2019	17th	NUP	Elected in 2016.	1987–present Catubig, Gamay, Laoang, Lapinig, Las Navas, Mapanas, Palapag, Pambujan, San Roque, Silvino Lobos
(1)		Jose L. Ong Jr.	June 30, 2019	June 30, 2022	18th	NUP	Elected in 2019.	1987–present Catubig, Gamay, Laoang, Lapinig, Las Navas, Mapanas, Palapag, Pambujan, San Roque, Silvino Lobos
6		Harris Christopher M. Ongchuan	June 30, 2022	June 30, 2025	19th	NUP	Elected in 2022.	1987–present Catubig, Gamay, Laoang, Lapinig, Las Navas, Mapanas, Palapag, Pambujan, San Roque, Silvino Lobos
(5)		Edwin C. Ongchuan	June 30, 2025	Incumbent	20th	PFP	Elected in 2025.	1987–present Catubig, Gamay, Laoang, Lapinig, Las Navas, Mapanas, Palapag, Pambujan, San Roque, Silvino Lobos

== Election results ==
=== 2025 ===
2025 Philippine House of Representatives elections
Party	Candidate	Votes	%
PFP	Edwin Ongchuan	96,304	85.06%
Aksyon	Roselyn Capoquian	12,544	11.08%
Independent	Enrico Caballa	4,365	3.86%
Total votes		113,213	100.00%
PFP gain from NUP			

=== 2022 ===
2022 Philippine House of Representatives elections
Party	Candidate	Votes	%
NUP	Harris Ongchuan	93,488	85.63%
Independent	George Lucero	11,565	10.59%
PROMDI	Leticia Siervo	4,118	3.77%
Total votes		109,171	100.00%
NUP hold			

=== 2019 ===
2019 Philippine House of Representatives elections
Party	Candidate	Votes	%
NUP	Jose L. Ong jr.	74,268	
Independent	Reyzandro Unay	17,302	
Total votes		91,570	100.00%
NUP hold			

=== 2016 ===
2016 Philippine House of Representatives elections
Party	Candidate	Votes	%
NUP	Edwin Ongchuan	67,653	100.00%
Total votes		67,653	100.00%
NUP hold			

== See also ==
- Legislative districts of Northern Samar
