= Gamay, Northern Samar =

Municipality in Northern Samar, Philippines

Gamay Bungto san Gamay
- Municipality
- Municipality of Gamay
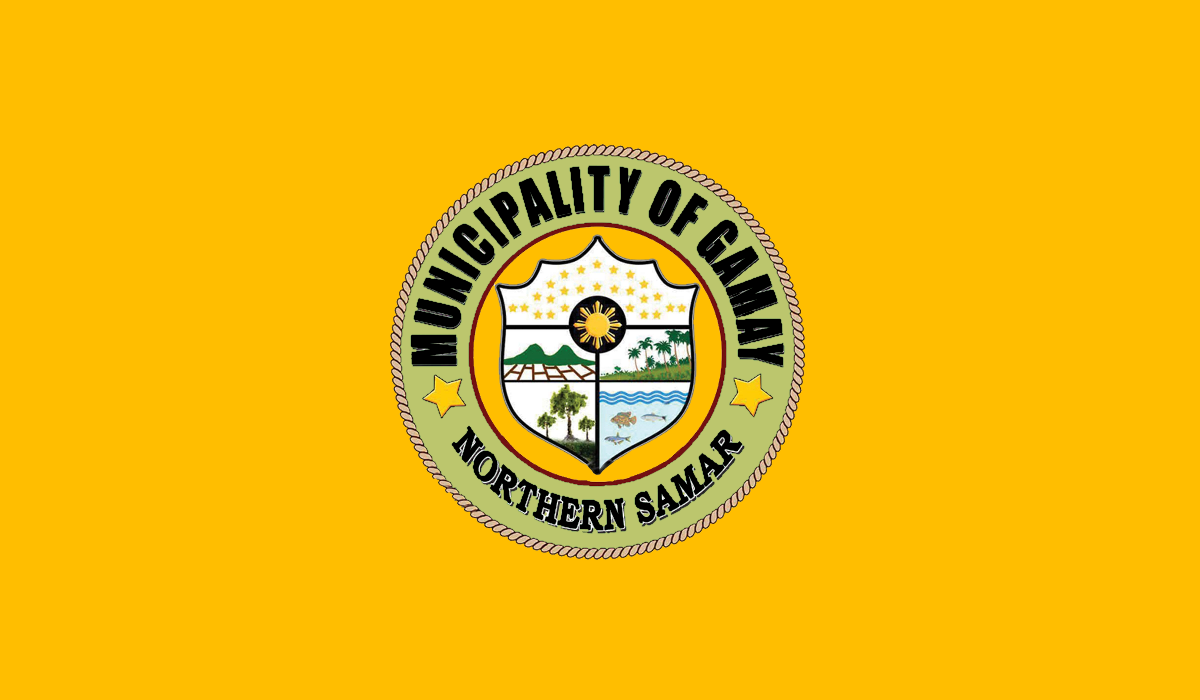
- Flag Seal
- Motto: Asenso Gamay
- Anthem: Gamay Hymn
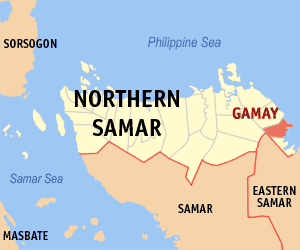
- Map of Northern Samar with Gamay highlighted
- Interactive map of Gamay
- Location within the Philippines
- Coordinates: 12°23′N 125°18′E
- Country: Philippines
- Region: Eastern Visayas
- Province: Northern Samar
- District: 2nd district
- Barangays: 26 (see Barangays)

Government
  - Type: Sangguniang Bayan
  - Mayor: Timoteo T. Capoquian Jr.
  - Vice Mayor: Clarita P. Gomba
  - Representative: Harris Christopher M. Ongchuan
  - Councilors: Cyril C. Costuna Emma J. Longcop Juan B. Clacito Belarmino P. Albino Banilo M. Castillo Honorio E. Rebay Orlando M. Nueva Teresita T. Valles Eddie D. Pelembergo, Jr. Nimfo G. Jaldo
  - Electorate: 16,689 voters (2025)

Area
  - Total: 115.10 km^{2} (44.44 sq mi)
- Elevation: 18 m (59 ft)
- Highest elevation: 172 m (564 ft)
- Lowest elevation: 0 m (0 ft)

Population (2024 census)
  - Total: 21,546
  - Density: 187.19/km^{2} (484.83/sq mi)
  - Households: 5,696

Economy
  - Income class: 3rd municipal income class
  - Poverty incidence: 24.5% (2023)
  - Revenue: ₱ 138.6 million (2024)
  - Assets: ₱ 639.2 million (2024)
  - Expenditure: ₱ 177 million (2024)
  - Liabilities: ₱ 192.1 million (2024)

Service provider
  - Electricity: Northern Samar Electric Cooperative (NORSAMELCO)
- Time zone: UTC+8 (PST)
- ZIP code: 6422
- PSGC: 0804807000
- IDD : area code: +63 (0)55
- Native languages: Waray; Tagalog

Gamay, officially the Municipality of Gamay (Waray: Bungto san Gamay; Tagalog: Bayan ng Gamay), is a municipality in the province of Northern Samar, Philippines. According to the 2024 census, it has a population of 21,546 people.

In the east, it is bounded by the Pacific Ocean, in the south by Lapinig, in the north-west by Mapanas and Catubig.

== History ==
In the past, Gamay was once a barrio within Palapag, one of the oldest towns in Samar, known for its strong religious beliefs. Legends and stories recount how the town acquired its name. According to a prevalent tale among the locals, a visiting Spaniard inquired about the name of the place to a lady who was weaving on a loom. Misunderstanding the question, she thought he was asking about her activity and replied "Gamay," which in the local dialect means 'fine'. This term refers to the finest strands of abaca, distinguishing them from medium and thicker strands known as "Urubayon" and "Kadagkuan," respectively.

The settlement, now known as Binongto-an, was established in the 14th or 15th century by descendants of seafaring Malays who migrated to the Philippine Archipelago. It wasn't until the late 16th or 17th century, with the arrival of Christianity brought by the Spaniards, that the name Gamay became prominent.

Despite facing raids from Muslim groups, particularly in the area of Binayaan, the Christian settlers in Binongto-an remained steadfast in their faith, eventually relocating near the river mouth by the sea to escape the attacks.

Until 1949, Gamay remained a barrio of Palapag. Subsequently, during the American period, there was resistance from the locals, resulting in the surrender of over 400 revolutionary soldiers known as "Pulajanes."

Over time, the municipality progressed, leading to its legal separation from Palapag. This separation was initiated by Rafael Albino Gomba, a native of Gamay, who was then the Mayor of Palapag. Through the enactment of Republic Act No. 90 on February 26, 1947, Gamay attained municipality status within the island province of Samar.

Initially, the incumbent barrio officials assumed roles as the new municipal officials. However, on November 9, 1965, following the division of Samar into three provinces (Western, Eastern, and Northern), Gamay became a municipality within Northern Samar.

== Government ==
The Municipal Government also has its own executive, legislative and judicial bodies.

Executive

The seat of the executive branch of the local government of Gamay is at the Municipal Hall located at the municipal proper itself with the municipal mayor acting as the local chief executive.

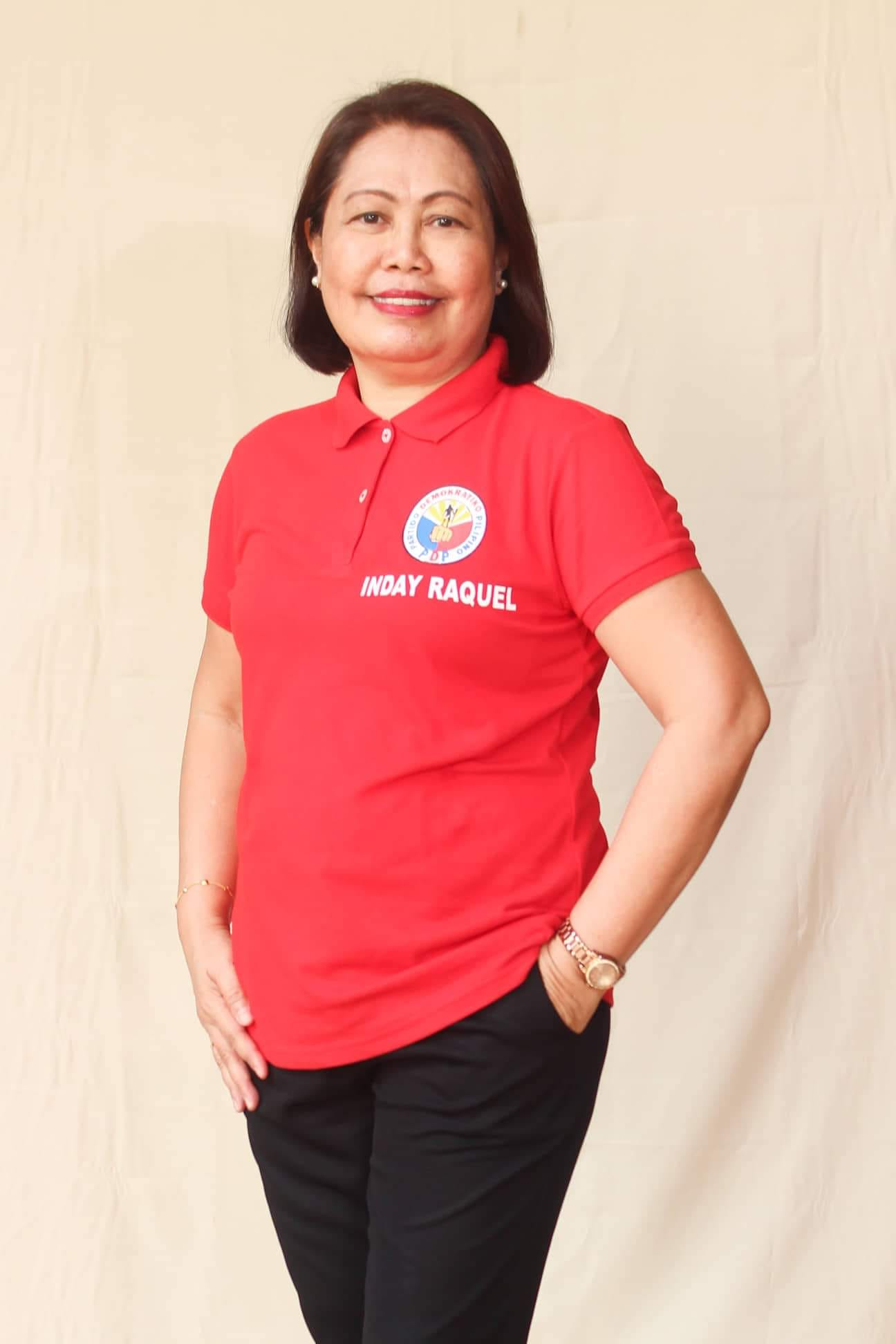
Raquel T. Capoquian, the incumbent mayor of Gamay

Legislative

The legislative department is represented by the local Sangguniang Bayan composed of ten (8) elected Regular Members and two (2) Ex-officio Members headed by the Municipal Vice Mayor as the presiding officer thereof.

Judicial

Municipal Trial Court - located at the Municipal Ground, Barangay Central.

Constitutional Bodies

Commission on Elections

=== Current Municipal Officials (since 2026) ===
Mayor: TIMOTEO T. CAPOQUIAN JR

Vice Mayor: CLARITA P. GOMBA

Sangguniang Bayan Members

- BELARMINO P. ALBINO
- ROMULO ALBINO
- AIDA CALIM
- RAQUEL T. CAPOQUIAN
- MOVEBLE MARTINICO
- CRISANTA MONTANCES
- RENIE REBAY
- TERESITA T. VALLES

Regular Members

- BANILO M. CASTILLO
- CYRIL C. COSTUNA
- JUAN B. CLACITO
- EMMA J. LONGCOP
- ORLANDO M. NUEVA
- HONORIO E. REBAY

Ex-officio Members

- EDDIE D. PELEMBERGO, JR. (SK Federation President)
- NIMFO G. JALDO (Liga ng mga Barangay Chapter President)

=== Former Municipal Mayors ===
- Egildo Tiberio Banawis (1947-1959)
- Rafael Albino Gomba (1959-1963)
- Egildo Tiberio Banawis (second term, 1964-1979)
- Farbeciano “Farbing” Nueva Bello (1980-1986)
- Nicolas Dala Doxi (1986-1987)
- Julina Potot Doxi (1988-1995)
- Enrique "Henry" Cojeda Gomba (1995-2004)
- Atty. Rodolfo "Odol" Mengullo Capoquian (2004-2007)
- Dr. Timoteo "Tim" Tilbe Capoquian Jr. (2007-2021)
- Clarita "Cayet" Pajanustan Gomba (2021-2022)
- Raquel “Inday” Tilbe Capoquian (2022-2025)
- Dr. Timoteo "Tim" Tilbe Capoquian Jr. (second term, 2025–)

== Education ==
Elementary

- Anito Elementary School
- Bangon Elementary School
- Bato Elementary School
- Bonificio Elementary School
- Cagamutan Central Elementary School
- Cabarasan Elementary School
- Cadac-an Elementary School
- Cade-an Elementary School
- Dao Elementary School
- G.M Osias Elementary School
- Guibwangan Elementary School
- Gamay Central Elementary School
- Gamay East Elementary School
- Gamay West Elementary School
- Henogawe Elementary School
- Libertad Elementary School
- Lonoy Elementary School
- Luneta Elementary School
- Malidong Elementary School
- Rizal Elementary School
- San Antonio Elementary School

High school

- Anito National High School
- Bangon National High School
- Cagamutan National High School
- Gamay National High School
- Gala Vocational School

== Geography ==
=== Barangays ===
Gamay is politically subdivided into 26 barangays. Each barangay consists of puroks and some have sitios.

- Anito
- Bangon
- Bato
- Baybay (Poblacion)
- Bonifacio
- Burabod (Poblacion)
- Cabarasan
- Cadac-an (Calingnan)
- Cade-an
- Cagamutan del Norte
- Cagamutan del Sur
- Central (Poblacion)
- Dao
- G. M. Osias
- Guibuangan
- Henogawe
- Libertad (Poblacion)
- Lonoy
- Luneta
- Malidong
- Occidental I (Poblacion)
- Occidental II (Poblacion)
- Oriental I (Poblacion)
- Oriental II (Poblacion)
- Rizal
- San Antonio

=== Climate ===
Climate data for Gamay, Northern Samar
Month	Jan	Feb	Mar	Apr	May	Jun	Jul	Aug	Sep	Oct	Nov	Dec	Year
Mean daily maximum °C (°F)	27 (81)	27 (81)	28 (82)	29 (84)	30 (86)	30 (86)	30 (86)	30 (86)	29 (84)	29 (84)	28 (82)	27 (81)	29 (84)
Mean daily minimum °C (°F)	23 (73)	22 (72)	22 (72)	23 (73)	24 (75)	24 (75)	24 (75)	24 (75)	24 (75)	24 (75)	24 (75)	23 (73)	23 (74)
Average precipitation mm (inches)	105 (4.1)	67 (2.6)	65 (2.6)	53 (2.1)	86 (3.4)	129 (5.1)	135 (5.3)	113 (4.4)	131 (5.2)	163 (6.4)	167 (6.6)	162 (6.4)	1,376 (54.2)
Average rainy days	17.6	13.2	15.5	14.9	19.6	24.3	26.6	25.4	24.9	25.4	22.9	20.9	251.2
Source: Meteoblue

== Demographics ==
Population census of Gamay
Year	Pop.	±% p.a.
1948	14,962	—
1960	12,156	−1.72%
1970	12,297	+0.12%
1975	15,370	+4.58%
1980	17,247	+2.33%
1990	15,764	−0.90%
1995	19,457	+4.02%
2000	21,314	+1.97%
2007	21,537	+0.14%
2010	22,425	+1.48%
2015	23,511	+0.90%
2020	23,367	−0.13%
2024	21,546	−1.93%
Source: Philippine Statistics Authority

== Economy ==
Poverty incidence of Gamay (%)

Source: Philippine Statistics Authority
