= Silvino Lobos =

Municipality in Northern Samar, Philippines

Silvino Lubos
- Municipality
- Silvino Lubos
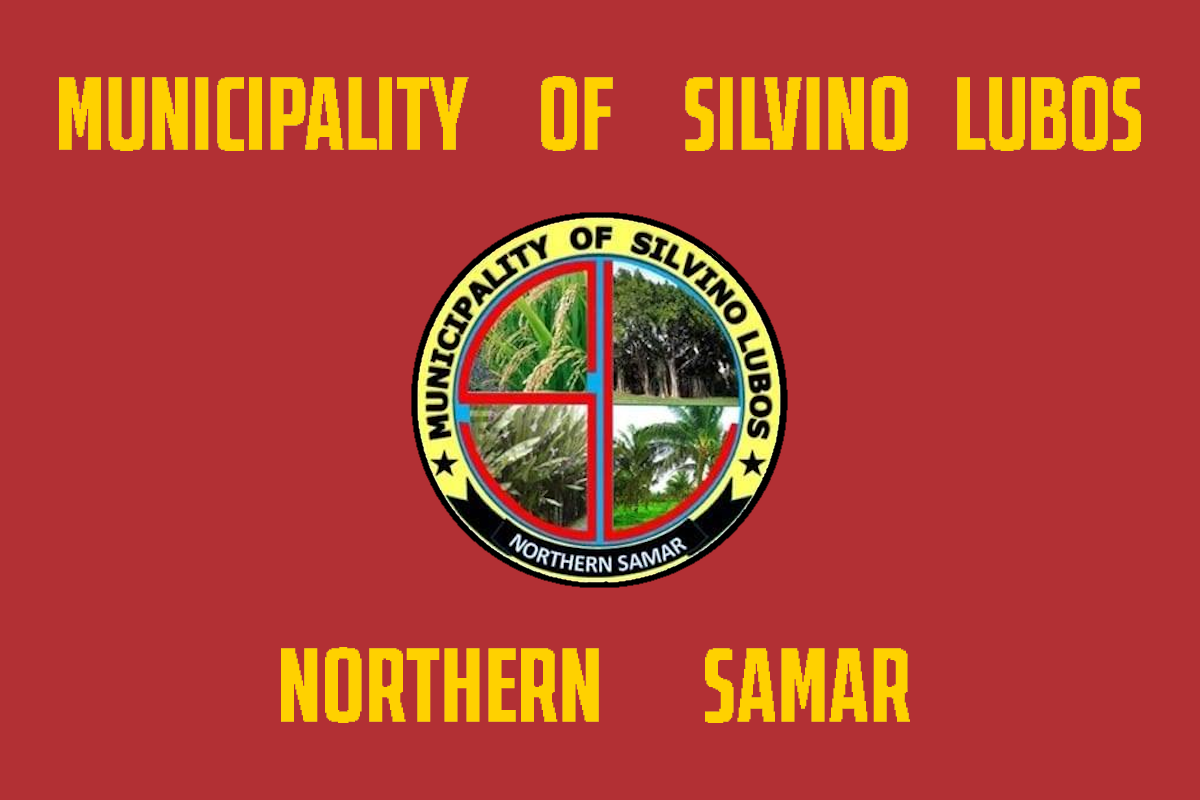
- Flag

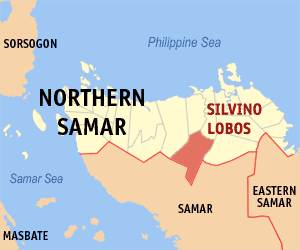
- Map of Northern Samar with Silvino Lobos highlighted
- Interactive map of Silvino Lubos
- Location within the Philippines
- Coordinates: 12°19′41″N 124°50′47″E
- Country: Philippines
- Region: Eastern Visayas
- Province: Northern Samar
- District: 2nd district
- Founded: 1965
- Barangays: 26 (see Barangays)

Government
  - Type: Sangguniang Bayan
  - Mayor: Leo L. Jarito
  - Vice Mayor: Remedios T. Espinar
  - Representative: Jose L. Ong Jr.
  - Councilors: List: • Gilbert L. Basarte; • Glenda C. Abueza; • Melvin A. Jarito; • Rodney L. Silvestre; • Mateo J. Pinca; • Jenny T. Celajes; • Mary Jane S. Jumadiao; • William L. Merino; DILG Masterlist of Officials
  - Electorate: 9,988 voters (2025)

Area
  - Total: 224.20 km^{2} (86.56 sq mi)
- Elevation: 104 m (341 ft)
- Highest elevation: 328 m (1,076 ft)
- Lowest elevation: 24 m (79 ft)

Population (2024 census)
  - Total: 15,512
  - Density: 69.188/km^{2} (179.20/sq mi)
  - Households: 2,931

Economy
  - Income class: 3rd municipal income class
  - Poverty incidence: 39.54% (2023)
  - Revenue: ₱ 140.5 million (2024)
  - Assets: ₱ 543.2 million (2024)
  - Expenditure: ₱ 156.4 million (2024)
  - Liabilities: ₱ 162.9 million (2024)

Service provider
  - Electricity: Northern Samar Electric Cooperative (NORSAMELCO)
- Time zone: UTC+8 (PST)
- ZIP code: 6414
- PSGC: 0804822000
- IDD : area code: +63 (0)55
- Native languages: Waray; Tagalog

Silvino Lubos, officially the Municipality of Silvino Lubos (Waray: Bungto han Silvino Lubos; Tagalog: Bayan ng Silvino Lubos), is a municipality in the province of Northern Samar, Philippines. According to the 2024 census, it has a population of 15,512 people.

== History ==
It is a former barrio of the town of Pambujan. Its former name was Barrio Suba until it became a town on June 17, 1967.

== Geography ==
=== Barangays ===
Silvino Lubos is politically subdivided into 26 barangays. Each barangay consists of puroks and some have sitios.

- Balud
- Cababayogan
- Cabunga-an
- Cagda-o
- Caghilot
- Camanggaran
- Camaya-an
- Deit de Suba
- Deit de Turag
- Gebonawan
- Gebolwangan
- Gecbo-an
- Giguimitan
- Genagasan
- Geparayan de Turag
- Gusaran
- Imelda
- Montalban
- Suba (Poblacion)
- San Isidro
- Senonogan de Tubang
- Tobgon
- Victory
- Poblacion I
- Poblacion II
- San Antonio

=== Climate ===
Climate data for Silvino Lubos, Northern Samar
Month	Jan	Feb	Mar	Apr	May	Jun	Jul	Aug	Sep	Oct	Nov	Dec	Year
Mean daily maximum °C (°F)	27 (81)	27 (81)	28 (82)	30 (86)	30 (86)	30 (86)	29 (84)	29 (84)	29 (84)	29 (84)	28 (82)	27 (81)	29 (83)
Mean daily minimum °C (°F)	22 (72)	22 (72)	22 (72)	22 (72)	24 (75)	24 (75)	24 (75)	24 (75)	24 (75)	24 (75)	23 (73)	23 (73)	23 (74)
Average precipitation mm (inches)	84 (3.3)	59 (2.3)	58 (2.3)	55 (2.2)	93 (3.7)	133 (5.2)	149 (5.9)	125 (4.9)	155 (6.1)	165 (6.5)	140 (5.5)	136 (5.4)	1,352 (53.3)
Average rainy days	18.1	13.6	15.8	16.1	21.7	25.5	26.6	25.1	24.8	25.8	22.7	20.1	255.9
Source: Meteoblue

== Demographics ==
Population census of Silvino Lobos
Year	Pop.	±% p.a.
1970	6,497	—
1975	7,633	+3.28%
1980	7,245	−1.04%
1990	9,071	+2.27%
1995	11,028	+3.73%
2000	12,645	+2.98%
2007	13,761	+1.17%
2010	14,303	+1.42%
2015	15,299	+1.29%
2020	15,100	−0.28%
2024	15,512	+0.65%
Source: Philippine Statistics Authority

== Economy ==
Poverty incidence of Silvino Lobos (%)

Source: Philippine Statistics Authority

Silvino Lubos had the highest poverty incidence of all cities and municipalities of the Philippines in 2015.

Silvino Lubos's economy is based on agriculture and timber since it is surrounded by forests.

Recently, tourism-based activities have started to develop as the town's cool weather conditions make the town's temperature conditions comparable to Baguio's and the rugged terrain similar to Sagada's. Camping tour organizers have been bringing tourists to the site as a new road paved the way for motor vehicles to reach Silvino Lubos overland on a much shorter travel time compared to motorized boats that ply the Pambujan River to reach the town in a much longer travel time. Before discovering river cruises, the town was reachable only by hiking through mountain trails from the nearest transport access point.
