= Siege of Catubig =

1900 battle of the Philippine–American War

- Part of Philippine–American War
Date	April 15–19, 1900
Location	Catubig, Philippines
Result	Filipino victory

Belligerents
First Philippine Republic	United States

Strength
600	Company H, 43d Infantry Regiment (PS)

Casualties and losses
~150 killed (Filipino claimed)	31 killed (Filipino claimed); 19 killed, 3 wounded (American claimed); 2 motorized small boats captured.

The siege of Catubig (Filipino: Pagkubkob sa Catubig) was a long and bloody engagement fought during the Philippine–American War, in which Filipino guerrillas launched a surprise attack against a detachment of U.S. infantry, and then forced them to abandon the town after a four-day siege. It began on April 15, 1900, and lasted four days before the survivors were rescued. The attack was very similar to the Balangiga Massacre south of Catubig a year later.

== Background ==
A few days before the battle, the U.S. 43d Infantry Regiment (PS) was sent to Catubig, on the northern part of the island of Samar, to stop guerrillas from getting supplies from suspected sympathizers. This was a time when conventional war in the Philippines had been abandoned and had entered the new phase of guerrilla warfare. The 43rd were relatively raw recruits and had little experience in combat. In fact, they had only been in the islands for four months before they were ordered to Catubig.

== Battle ==
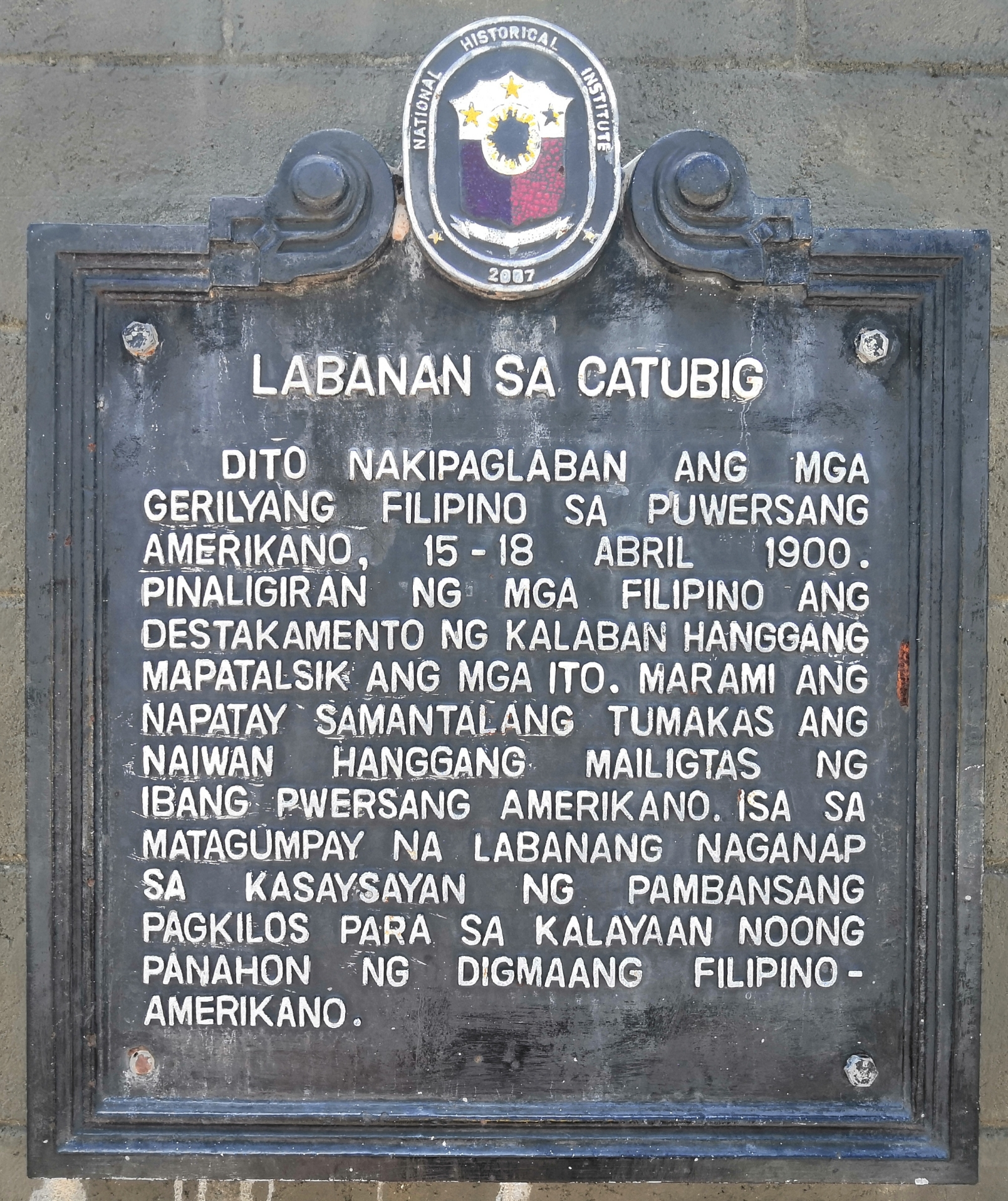
Historical marker installed in 2007 at the grounds of Catubig Church

On the morning of April 15, General Vicente Lukban gives an order to Col. Enrique Daguhob to attack the Americans in Catubig. Under the command of Col. Enrique Daguhob, hundreds of Filipino guerillas attacked American forces, armed with bolos, pistols, spears, and Mausers. The guerillas used cannon and rifles to drive the entire regiment into the church.

After two days of withstanding fire and attempts to set the church ablaze, the Americans retreated to the river. Setting fire to their barracks, the Americans made for the river, but the Filipinos were ready and the American retreat lost all coordination and in the panic 19 were killed and 3 wounded as they claimed. The American survivors reached the river bank and dug makeshift trenches with their bayonets. The Americans held out for another two days, though the Filipinos were only 100 yards away. They kept the guerillas in check until a rescue party in the steamer Lao Aug came to their aid.

== Aftermath ==
The bloody battle was reported by the American media, and Henry T. Allen was criticized for his pacification campaign with its isolated garrisons. Allen then directed that "a proper punishment be effected on the Catubig Valley."

It was said that all soldiers of the 43rd, 19 were killed and 3 were wounded, although some sources state the number of killed at 31. The Philippine losses claim to be at 150, US Army accounts claims it even higher. The survivors of Company C, who were nearly annihilated during the Balangiga massacre, also claimed extremely high losses on the Filipino side.
