= Siday =

Siday is a surname. Notable people with the surname include:

- R. E. Siday (1912–1956), English mathematician
- Eric Siday (1905–1976), British-American composer and musician
