= Lapinig =

Municipality in Northern Samar, Philippines

- Municipality
- Municipality of Lapinig
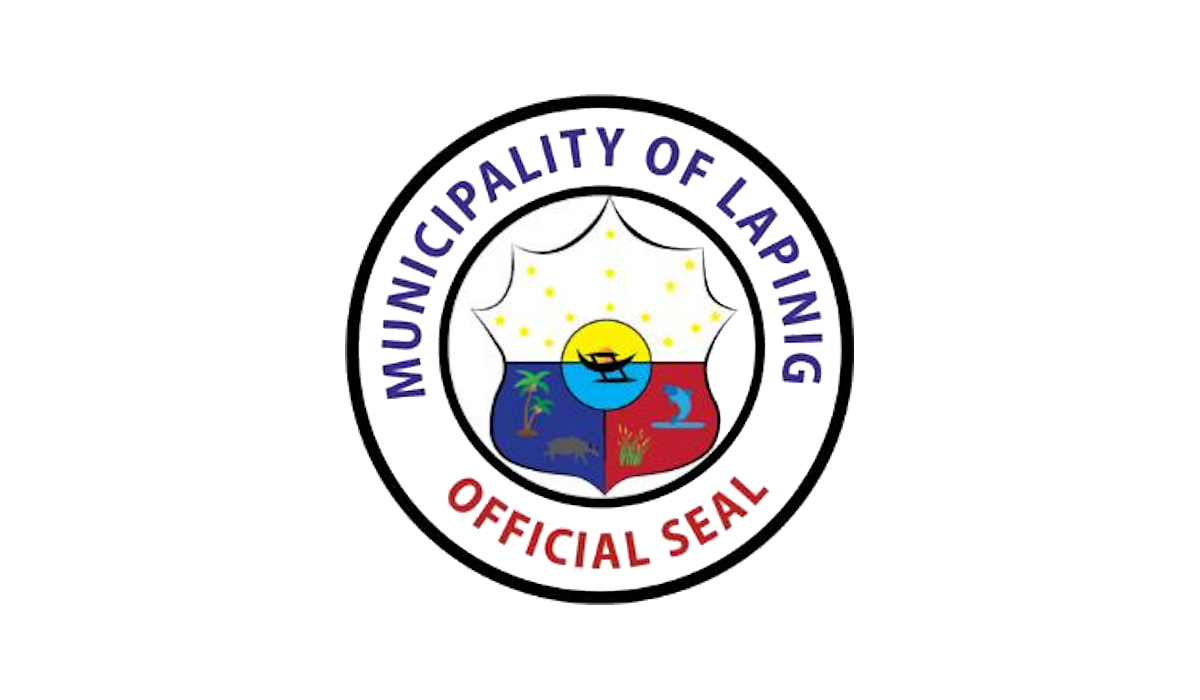
- Flag

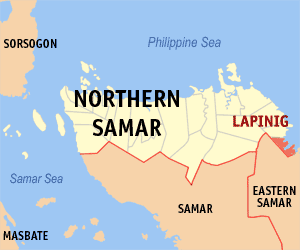
- Map of Northern Samar with Lapinig highlighted
- Interactive map of Lapinig
- Location within the Philippines
- Coordinates: 12°18′54″N 125°18′07″E
- Country: Philippines
- Region: Eastern Visayas
- Province: Northern Samar
- District: 2nd district
- Founded: June 14, 1956
- Barangays: 15 (see Barangays)

Government
  - Type: Sangguniang Bayan
  - Mayor: Ma. Luisa A. Menzon
  - Vice Mayor: Flora S. Quilicol
  - Representative: Jose L. Ong Jr.
  - Councilors: List: • Annde P. Openia; • Edward M. Hermano; • Vivian M. Rongcales; • Ruby Q. Delmonte; • Artemio Y. Delmonte; • Redentor L. Pajares; • Bartolome P. Mengote; • Carlito O. Morallos; DILG Masterlist of Officials
  - Electorate: 8,097 voters (2025)

Area
  - Total: 57.30 km^{2} (22.12 sq mi)
- Elevation: 17 m (56 ft)
- Highest elevation: 112 m (367 ft)
- Lowest elevation: 0 m (0 ft)

Population (2024 census)
  - Total: 11,908
  - Density: 207.8/km^{2} (538.2/sq mi)
  - Households: 2,659
- Demonym: Lapinignon

Economy
  - Income class: 5th municipal income class
  - Poverty incidence: 30.23% (2023)
  - Revenue: ₱ 93.79 million (2024)
  - Assets: ₱ 266.8 million (2024)
  - Expenditure: ₱ 114.6 million (2024)
  - Liabilities: ₱ 103.4 million (2024)

Service provider
  - Electricity: Northern Samar Electric Cooperative (NORSAMELCO)
- Time zone: UTC+8 (PST)
- ZIP code: 6411
- PSGC: 0804809000
- IDD : area code: +63 (0)55
- Native languages: Waray; Tagalog

Lapinig, officially the Municipality of Lapinig (Waray: Bungto han Lapinig; Tagalog: Bayan ng Lapinig), is a municipality in the province of Northern Samar, Philippines. According to the 2024 census, it has a population of 11,908 people.

It is Northern Samar's boundary municipality with Eastern Samar on its coastal side in the Pacific Ocean. To the south, it is bounded by Arteche, to the west by Jipapad, to the northeast by the Pacific Ocean, and in the northwest by Gamay.

== Etymology ==
The name "Lapinig" is derived from the local wasp or bee known as the "lapinig."

== History ==
On June 14, 1956, the municipality of Lapinig was formed out of portions of nearby municipalities of Gamay and Oras. It was then part of the undivided province of Samar. It initially consisted of barrios Cagamotan, Can Maria, Canomanio, Catumsan, Look, Lapinig (municipal seat), Potong, and Pio Del Pilar, and sitios Cahagwayan, Mabini, and Palanas. In 1965, as a result of the partition of Samar, Lapinig became part of the newly established province of Northern Samar.

== Geography ==
=== Barangays ===
Lapinig is politically subdivided into 15 barangays. Each barangay consists of puroks and some have sitios.

- Alang-alang
- Bagacay
- Cahagwayan
- Can Maria
- Can Omanio
- Imelda
- Lapinig del Sur (Poblacion)
- Lapinig del Norte (Poblacion)
- Lo-ok
- Mabini
- May-igot
- Palanas
- Pio Del Pilar
- Potong
- Potong Del Sur

=== Climate ===
Climate data for Lapinig, Northern Samar
Month	Jan	Feb	Mar	Apr	May	Jun	Jul	Aug	Sep	Oct	Nov	Dec	Year
Mean daily maximum °C (°F)	27 (81)	27 (81)	28 (82)	29 (84)	30 (86)	30 (86)	30 (86)	30 (86)	29 (84)	29 (84)	28 (82)	27 (81)	29 (84)
Mean daily minimum °C (°F)	23 (73)	22 (72)	22 (72)	23 (73)	24 (75)	24 (75)	24 (75)	24 (75)	24 (75)	24 (75)	24 (75)	23 (73)	23 (74)
Average precipitation mm (inches)	105 (4.1)	67 (2.6)	65 (2.6)	53 (2.1)	86 (3.4)	129 (5.1)	135 (5.3)	113 (4.4)	131 (5.2)	163 (6.4)	167 (6.6)	162 (6.4)	1,376 (54.2)
Average rainy days	17.6	13.2	15.5	14.9	19.6	24.3	26.6	25.4	24.9	25.4	22.9	20.9	251.2
Source: Meteoblue

== Demographics ==
Population census of Lapinig
Year	Pop.	±% p.a.
1960	7,610	—
1970	6,598	−1.42%
1975	7,426	+2.40%
1980	7,481	+0.15%
1990	8,232	+0.96%
1995	9,813	+3.35%
2000	10,798	+2.07%
2007	11,198	+0.50%
2010	11,744	+1.75%
2015	13,020	+1.98%
2020	11,844	−1.97%
2024	11,908	+0.13%
Source: Philippine Statistics Authority

== Economy ==
Poverty incidence of Lapinig (%)

Source: Philippine Statistics Authority
