= San Roque, Northern Samar =

Municipality in Northern Samar, Philippines

San Roque
- Municipality
- Municipality of San Roque
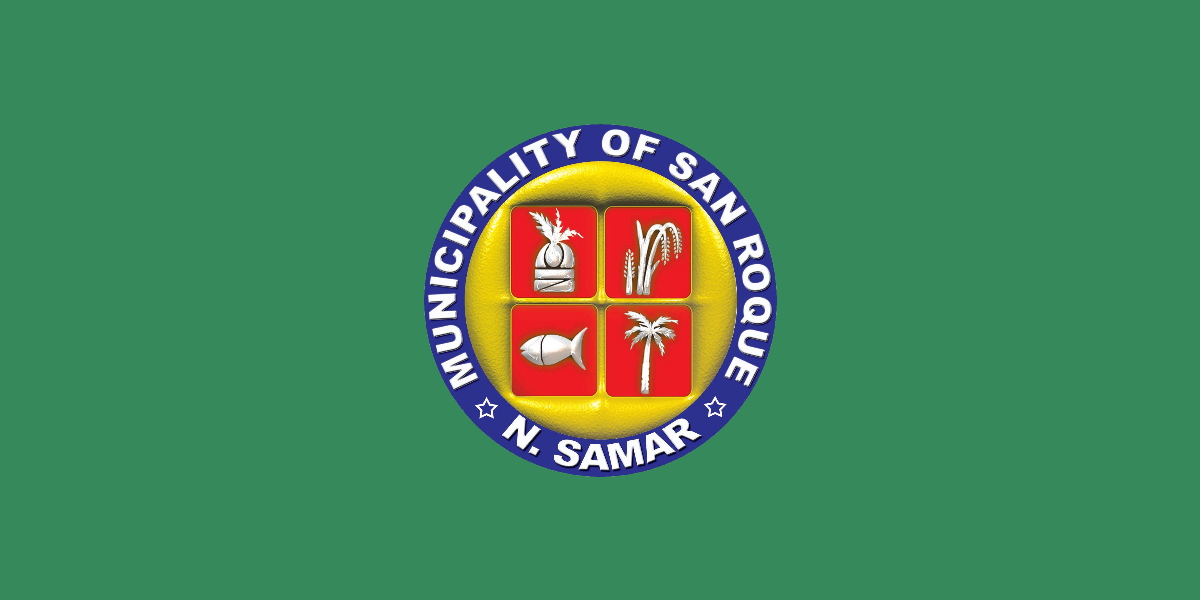
- Flag

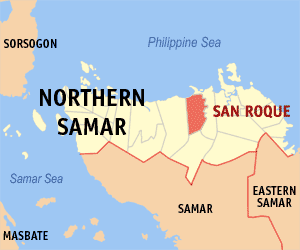
- Map of Northern Samar with San Roque highlighted
- Interactive map of San Roque
- Location within the Philippines
- Coordinates: 12°31′59″N 124°52′01″E
- Country: Philippines
- Region: Eastern Visayas
- Province: Northern Samar
- District: 2nd district
- Founded: 1959
- Named for: Saint Roch
- Barangays: 16 (see Barangays)

Government
  - Type: Sangguniang Bayan
  - Mayor: Maria Ana G. Abalon
  - Vice Mayor: Ethel Ombrog Ramirez
  - Representative: Jose L. Ong Jr.
  - Councilors: List: • Jocelyn U. Curso; • Feddie F. Jarito; • Hilario S. Acebuche; • Ethel O. Ramirez; • Dante C. Tan; • Alvin M. Lagrimas; • Solidad S. Cagro; • Jincky F. Cisneros; DILG Masterlist of Officials
  - Electorate: 17,816 voters (2025)

Area
  - Total: 152.98 km^{2} (59.07 sq mi)
- Elevation: 7.4 m (24 ft)
- Highest elevation: 202 m (663 ft)
- Lowest elevation: 0 m (0 ft)

Population (2024 census)
  - Total: 29,993
  - Density: 196.06/km^{2} (507.79/sq mi)
  - Households: 5,619

Economy
  - Income class: 3rd municipal income class
  - Poverty incidence: 35.26% (2023)
  - Revenue: ₱ 203.2 million (2024)
  - Assets: ₱ 552.9 million (2024)
  - Expenditure: ₱ 196.9 million (2024)
  - Liabilities: ₱ 90.17 million (2024)

Service provider
  - Electricity: Northern Samar Electric Cooperative (NORSAMELCO)
- Time zone: UTC+8 (PST)
- ZIP code: 6415
- PSGC: 0804820000
- IDD : area code: +63 (0)55
- Native languages: Waray; Tagalog
- Website: www.sanroque-nsamar.gov.ph

San Roque, officially the Municipality of San Roque (Waray: Bungto han San Roque; Tagalog: Bayan ng San Roque), is a municipality in the province of Northern Samar, Philippines. According to the 2020 census, it has a population of 29,882 people.

San Roque was originally a part of Pambujan. San Roque is the Spanish language name for Saint Roch.

== History ==
Republic Act No. 2102, which created the municipality of San Roque, was enacted without executive approval on March 28, 1959. The territory of the town was described as follows:

- On the north by the limits of the municipal water as prescribed by the Revised Administrative Code;
- On the Northeast in straight line starting from the seashore down to the Cacapisan Creek passing Dale up to the bank of the Pambujan River;
- On the East thru a straight line from the bank of the Pambujan River running south-westerly to the mouth of the Cabigaho Creek;
- On the West by a straight line retaining the former boundary between Mondragon and Pambujan.

The law creating the town referred to the barrios of Lao-angan, Coroconog, Dale, Balnasan, Bantayan, Pagsang-an, Malobago, Lawa-an, Ginagda-nan, and Balud and the sitio of Cabigaho as comprising the town.

== Geography ==
=== Barangays ===
San Roque is politically subdivided into 16 barangays. Each barangay consists of puroks and some have sitios.

- Balnasan
- Balud
- Bantayan
- Coroconog
- Dale
- Ginagdanan
- Lao-angan
- Lawaan
- Malobago
- Pagsang-an
- Zone 1 (Poblacion)
- Zone 2 (Poblacion)
- Zone 3 (Poblacion)
- Zone 4 (Poblacion)
- Zone 5 (Poblacion)
- Zone 6 (Poblacion)

=== Climate ===
Climate data for San Roque, Northern Samar
Month	Jan	Feb	Mar	Apr	May	Jun	Jul	Aug	Sep	Oct	Nov	Dec	Year
Mean daily maximum °C (°F)	27 (81)	28 (82)	29 (84)	30 (86)	31 (88)	30 (86)	29 (84)	29 (84)	29 (84)	29 (84)	29 (84)	28 (82)	29 (84)
Mean daily minimum °C (°F)	22 (72)	22 (72)	22 (72)	22 (72)	24 (75)	24 (75)	24 (75)	24 (75)	24 (75)	24 (75)	23 (73)	23 (73)	23 (74)
Average precipitation mm (inches)	84 (3.3)	59 (2.3)	58 (2.3)	55 (2.2)	93 (3.7)	133 (5.2)	149 (5.9)	125 (4.9)	155 (6.1)	165 (6.5)	140 (5.5)	136 (5.4)	1,352 (53.3)
Average rainy days	18.1	13.6	15.8	16.1	21.7	25.5	26.6	25.1	24.8	25.8	22.7	20.1	255.9
Source: Meteoblue

== Demographics ==
Population census of San Roque
Year	Pop.	±% p.a.
1970	10,375	—
1975	12,767	+4.25%
1980	13,106	+0.53%
1990	13,856	+0.56%
1995	18,094	+5.13%
2000	19,845	+2.00%
2007	22,897	+1.99%
2010	26,323	+5.21%
2015	30,580	+2.90%
2020	29,882	−0.48%
2024	29,993	+0.09%
Source: Philippine Statistics Authority

== Economy ==
Poverty incidence of San Roque (%)

Source: Philippine Statistics Authority

== Government ==
=== List of former chief executives ===
The following served as Municipal Mayors of San Roque, Northern Samar:

- Diego Merino (appointed, 1960–1963);
- Juan F Abalon (elected, 1964–1967);
- Oscar O Abalon (elected, 1968–1980);
- Lucio O Abalon (elected, 1980-1981 - died in office 15 Sept 1981);
- Enriquito B Lagrimas (succeeded, 1981–1986);
- Eliseo M Lim (designated OIC, 1986–1987);
- Froctuoso Solomon (designated OIC, 1987–1988);
- Ramon C Lubos (elected, 1988–1998);
- Benito B Tuballas (succeeded, 1998);
- Don L Abalon (elected, 1998–2004);
- Andre L Abalon (elected, 2004-2013 - died in office 13 May 2013);
- Jocelyn U Curso (succeeded, 2013);
- Don L Abalon (elected 2013–2022: first mayor to return to office);
- Maria Ana G Abalon (elected 2022–present)

=== List of barangay chairmen ===
- Balnasan - Chairman: Gilbert Mora (1st Term)
- Balud - Chairman: Deogenes Tuba (2nd Term)
- Bantayan - Chairman: Arnel Acibar (1st Term)
- Coroconog - Chairman: Luz Mora (3rd Term)
- Dale - Chairman: Christopher Tuballas (1st Term)
- Ginagdanan - Chairman: Alma Cantong (succeeded)
- Lao-angan - Chairman: Jun Morales (1st Term)
- Lawaan - Chairman: Rufino Teberio (1st Term)
- Malobago - Chairman: Gerardo Bantilo (2nd Term)
- Pagsang-an Chairman: Elmer Enero (3rd Term)
- Zone 1 (Poblacion) - Chairman: Aurora Surio (1st Term)
- Zone 2 (Poblacion) - Chairman: Antonio Baluyot (2nd Term)
- Zone 3 (Poblacion) - Chairman: Ricky Enero (2nd Term)
- Zone 4 (Poblacion) - Chairman: Antolín Baluyot Jr (1st Term)
- Zone 5 (Poblacion) - Chairman: Freddie Jarito (2nd Term)
- Zone 6 (Poblacion) - Chairman: Diosdado Díaz (1st Term)
