= Las Navas =

Municipality in Northern Samar, Philippines

Las Navas Binuntuan
- Municipality
- Municipality of Las Navas
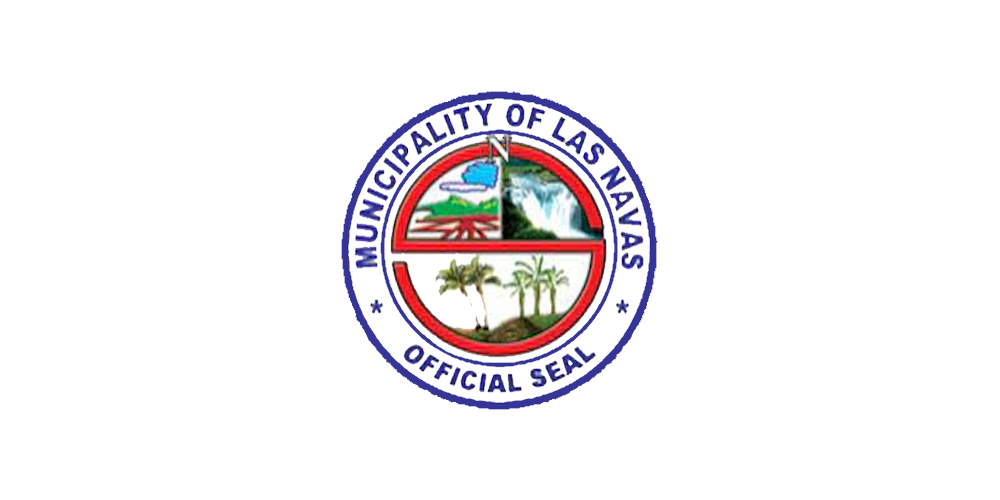
- Flag

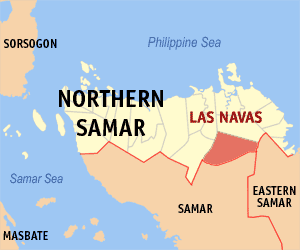
- Map of Northern Samar with Las Navas highlighted
- Interactive map of Las Navas
- Location within the Philippines
- Coordinates: 12°20′24″N 125°01′55″E
- Country: Philippines
- Region: Eastern Visayas
- Province: Northern Samar
- District: 2nd district
- Barangays: 53 (see Barangays)

Government
  - Type: Sangguniang Bayan
  - Mayor: Arlito A. Tan
  - Vice Mayor: Minda M. Tan
  - Representative: Jose L. Ong Jr.
  - Councilors: List: • Florepes A. Lluz; • Gil R. Ong; • Alvin A. Pajuelas; • Vanessa Lym U. Mercader; • Melchor B. Oronos; • Rufel Y. Golondrina; • Antonio J. Casio; • Neilmar T. Oroncillo; DILG Masterlist of Officials
  - Electorate: 23,620 voters (2025)

Area
  - Total: 282.61 km^{2} (109.12 sq mi)
- Elevation: 32 m (105 ft)
- Highest elevation: 254 m (833 ft)
- Lowest elevation: 0 m (0 ft)

Population (2024 census)
  - Total: 37,425
  - Density: 132.43/km^{2} (342.98/sq mi)
  - Households: 7,786

Economy
  - Income class: 2nd municipal income class
  - Poverty incidence: 34.22% (2023)
  - Revenue: ₱ 220.9 million (2024)
  - Assets: ₱ 791.8 million (2024)
  - Expenditure: ₱ 201.3 million (2024)
  - Liabilities: ₱ 365.6 million (2024)

Service provider
  - Electricity: Northern Samar Electric Cooperative (NORSAMELCO)
- Time zone: UTC+8 (PST)
- ZIP code: 6423
- PSGC: 0804810000
- IDD : area code: +63 (0)55
- Native languages: Waray; Tagalog

Las Navas, officially the Municipality of Las Navas (Waray: Bungto han Las Navas; Tagalog: Bayan ng Las Navas), is a municipality in the province of Northern Samar, Philippines. According to the 2024 census, it has a population of 37,425 people.

== Etymology ==
Before the reversion of the municipality to a mere barrio, a certain Spanish Colonel of the Spanish Armed Forces by the name of De Las Navas explored the northern part of Samar. He sailed with his men upstream Catubig River and reached a place called "Binongtu-an". The people warmly met him as a high-ranking Official of the Spanish Armed Forces with full respect and high regard to the Government.

In his visit to the place, he changed the name "Binongtu-an" to Las Navas in his honor and serve as a reminder that a prominent Spanish Army arrived and reached the place. The people accepted Las Navas as its official name.

== History ==
During the Spanish regime, one of the municipalities that was recognized as a town is Las Navas, formerly known as "Bungto" (meaning town). Upon recognition, a Parochial Church was constructed with a Parochial Priest as head of the town.

Towards the end of the 18th century, a band of Moro pirates sailed to the river and reached the town. There, the inhabitants were robbed and the town was burned. Afraid that the pirates would return again, the people abandoned the town for a period of time.

After several months, the people returned to the place and retrieved all that were left by the fire. They constructed their homes and reestablished the town and the seat of the government. As soon as the municipality was reestablished and the community was stabilized, the populace and leaders unanimously agreed to change the town's name from "Bungto" (Town) to "Binongtu–an" to emphasize and commemorate that the place was once a thriving town, was abandoned because of Moro pirates' assault, and was resettled after sometime.

A research on the history of Las Navas revealed documents from the National Archives, "Errecion de los Pueblos Samar 1786-1898, Pueblos de Catubig y Binungtuan Tomo", Exp. 9, pol. 149–197. Exepediente promovido en 1832 sobre la erreccion de la visita de Binungtuan en pueblo civil independiente de su matriz Catubig en la prov de Samar, Manila, 20 de Dissiembre de 1848.

== Geography ==
Las Navas is situated in the heart of Samar Island, lying along Catubig River. It comprises a wide lowlands between hills now known as the Catubig Valley. The Las Navas river is wide and big enough that small tonnage or motored vessels can easily sail to the source of the river. It is bounded on the north by Catubig, on the east by Jipapad, Eastern Samar, on the west by Silvino Lubos, and on the south by the municipality of Matuguinao and San Jose de Buan, Western Samar (Samar).

The municipality has a total land area of 28,261 hectares (69,830 acres). Most of this land is devoted to agricultural production and the rest are forest reserves. Its soil is predominantly silt and clay loam with fine texture and high water retention. This soil type is fertile and suitable for lowland rice but needs water drainage for upland crops.

=== Bodies of water ===
Rivers, brooks, creeks can be found practically when hiking from one place to another and traversed by the Las Navas River (formerly Catubig river). The Las Navas River (formerly Catubig River) is considered the main river, compared to Hinaga River and Hagbay River.

=== Climate ===
Climate data for Las Navas, Northern Samar
Month	Jan	Feb	Mar	Apr	May	Jun	Jul	Aug	Sep	Oct	Nov	Dec	Year
Mean daily maximum °C (°F)	27 (81)	27 (81)	28 (82)	29 (84)	30 (86)	30 (86)	30 (86)	30 (86)	29 (84)	29 (84)	28 (82)	27 (81)	29 (84)
Mean daily minimum °C (°F)	23 (73)	22 (72)	22 (72)	23 (73)	24 (75)	24 (75)	24 (75)	24 (75)	24 (75)	24 (75)	24 (75)	23 (73)	23 (74)
Average precipitation mm (inches)	105 (4.1)	67 (2.6)	65 (2.6)	53 (2.1)	86 (3.4)	129 (5.1)	135 (5.3)	113 (4.4)	131 (5.2)	163 (6.4)	167 (6.6)	162 (6.4)	1,376 (54.2)
Average rainy days	17.6	13.2	15.5	14.9	19.6	24.3	26.6	25.4	24.9	25.4	22.9	20.9	251.2
Source: Meteoblue

=== Barangays ===
Las Navas is politically subdivided into 53 barangays. Each barangay consists of puroks and some have sitios.

- Balugo
- Bugay
- Bugtosan
- Bukid
- Bulao
- Caputoan
- Catoto-ogan
- Cuenco
- Dapdap
- Del Pilar
- Dolores
- Epaw
- Geguinta
- Geracdo (also known as F. Robis)
- Guyo
- H. Jolejole District (Poblacion)
- Hangi
- Imelda
- L. Empon
- Lakandula
- Lumala-og
- Lourdes
- Mabini
- Macarthur
- Magsaysay
- Matelarag
- Osmeña
- Paco
- Palanas
- Perez
- Poponton
- Quezon
- Quirino
- Quirino District (Poblacion)
- Rebong
- Rizal
- Roxas
- Rufino
- Sag-od
- San Andres
- San Antonio
- San Fernando
- San Francisco
- San Isidro
- San Jorge
- San Jose
- San Miguel
- Santo Tomas
- Tagab-Iran
- Tagan-ayan
- Taylor
- Victory
- H. Jolejole

== Demographics ==
Population census of Las Navas
Year	Pop.	±% p.a.
1960	14,043	—
1970	19,925	+3.56%
1975	23,715	+3.55%
1980	21,216	−2.20%
1990	22,017	+0.37%
1995	25,031	+2.43%
2000	29,346	+3.47%
2007	32,197	+1.29%
2010	36,539	+4.71%
2015	37,947	+0.72%
2020	36,621	−0.75%
2024	37,425	+0.52%
Source: Philippine Statistics Authority

== Language ==
Generally, the people speak Waray-Waray language as a common dialect, while English and Pilipino is used only as medium of instructions in schools and other types of communications.

== Economy ==
Poverty incidence of Las Navas (%)

Source: Philippine Statistics Authority

The municipality is basically an agricultural area with rice production as a major activity. However, of the total land area, only 47.33 km^{2} are planted with rice, while 32.75 km^{2} are devoted to coconuts. The remaining areas are planted with abaca with a total of 13.32 km^{2}, and root crops with a total of 5.4 km^{2}. Livestocks and poultry are considered a major source of livelihood for small farmers and their families. Other major resources include timber products, tikog and rattan are also abundant, offering such bright prospect for agricultural development and for subsequent industrialization through small and medium scale industries.

== Infrastructure ==
=== Transportation ===
Las Navas today is now connected to the national road system. The road and Las Navas bridge were formally inaugurated by President Gloria Macapagal Arrroyo on June 16, 2009.

Before President Gloria Macapagal Arroyo inaugurated the Las Navas Bridge connecting the municipality to the national road system, Las Navas used to be an isolated municipality and was mainly accessible through water navigation along the Catubig river with the use of motorized wooden boats and bancas. The motorboats ply between Las Navas and Catubig daily at PhP 40.00 (US$0.80) per person. These small boats dock at small docking facilities called "Look" in both Catubig and Las Navas. It only takes 30 minutes to get to Las Navas from Catubig, and boats traverse the river daily starting at 5:00a.m.

Within the municipality, travel between barangays closer to the Poblacion is now made possible through motorcycles and pedicabs using the local farm-to-market road system. For far-flung barangays that are not connected to the local farm-to-market road network, small motorboats and bancas are still used today for travel from the barangays to the poblacion. Some locals also prefer to hike continuing the age-old tradition.

=== Communication facilities ===
A Telecom Office and a municipal Post Office are the only major communication facilities of the town. Both facilities are located in the municipal compound in La Purisima St., Jolejole District.

The town has two cell sites, smart and globe communication. The internet connection is now available through globe tattoo. Signal reaches to different barangay in this municipality.

=== Water supply ===
No functioning water works system currently serve the poblacion of Las Navas. In the barangays, individual households usually obtain water from wells, springs, rain catchment and from the river.

== Education ==
Education is given emphasis and is the top priority among the programs of the municipality. Educational facilities include an elementary school district offering all levels (Grades 1 through 6), while 39 barangay primary schools offer limited levels.

It has a complete secondary school which offers agro – industrial technology and basic academic requirements. Also, Las Navas has a technical-vocational school that is known to be the sole Technical Education and Skills Development Authority's (TESDA) Administered School in the 2nd District of the Province of Northern Samar, the TESDA-Las Navas Agro-Industrial School (TESDA-LNAIS) that offers eighteen (18) technical-vocational courses registered under the Unified TVET Program Registration and Accreditation System (UTPRAS) being managed by Vivian Abueva Poblete, the Vocational School Administrator II. Las Navas has also a tertiary school which is the Colegio de Las Navas-the only community college in Northern Samar which is owned and operated by the Local Government Unit of this municipality. This community college offers free tuition fees to those underprivileged students.(Leonard Ocino Lluz, Assistant Municipal Assessor/LGU-Las Navas)

== Healthcare ==
The municipality is served by a district hospital of the adjacent town of Catubig, but it has its own Rural Health Center in the Poblacion and other barangay Health Stations for health services. Girlie Drugstore is the only operational pharmacy in the area, located at La Purisima Street, Poblacion.

For health manpower, one rural health Physician serves the area assisted by a rural health nurse, a sanitary inspector, four rural Health Midwives, as well as volunteers for health services known as Barangay Health Workers (SHWS). It is through this government organization where health care and family planning including immunization are implemented.

== Tourism ==
Fifteen kilometers upstream on Catubig River from poblacion, the most famous waterfalls in Northern Samar, known as the "Pinipisakan Falls", towers as the main tourist attraction of the municipality. The place is accessible by traversing the river on motorboats and by land through motorcycles, tricycles, and pedicabs.

Pinipisakan Falls was formally designated as a top provincial tourist attraction on August 18, 2009, with the SINP-DENR present for the groundbreaking and inauguration of the place as an ecotourism destination.

Las Navas also boasts of beautiful caves located near the 3KM marker, the hanging bridge connecting the barangay of Lomalaog to the town proper, and the Ginagatusan Lake.

The construction of the Las Navas Dam for the irrigation of the Las Navas valley created a reservoir where people go for a dip during summer. The recently-renovated Our Lady's Nativity Church has a neo-European facade.

The Las Navas View Deck, accessible through the Central Elementary School, offers an unobstructed panoramic view of the whole town.

The annual town fiesta on September 8 is a tourism highlight drawing visitors from balikbayans and guests to the town to celebrate the birthday of Mama Mary. The colorful parade, the search for the Mutya san Las Navas, the festive carnival and baratillos, the morning novenas, and the biennial Baranding are some of the activities during the fiesta.
