= Mapanas =

Municipality in Northern Samar, Philippines

- Municipality
- Municipality of Mapanas
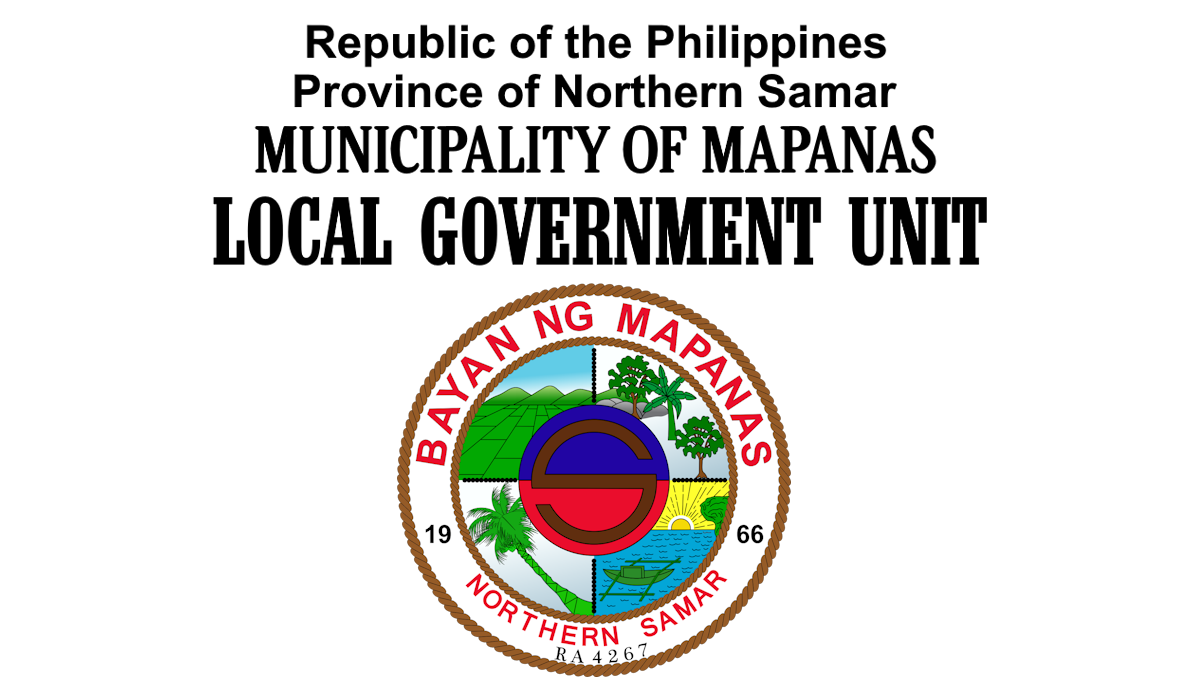
- Flag Seal

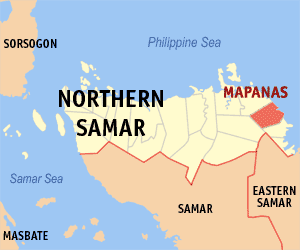
- Map of Northern Samar with Mapanas highlighted
- Interactive map of Mapanas
- Location within the Philippines
- Coordinates: 12°28′30″N 125°15′14″E
- Country: Philippines
- Region: Eastern Visayas
- Province: Northern Samar
- District: 2nd district
- Barangays: 13 (see Barangays)

Government
  - Type: Sangguniang Bayan
  - Mayor: Francis John L. Tejano
  - Vice Mayor: Rogelio T. Longcop
  - Representative: Jose L. Ong Jr.
  - Councilors: List: • Jesusita C. Bernadas; • Marcial G. Barnobal; • Greggy Fer P. Laodenio; • Melchor T. Capoquian; • Cyrus A. Borja; • Nora B. Bandilla; • Saturnino T. Laodenio; • Modesto G. Longcop; DILG Masterlist of Officials
  - Electorate: 11,129 voters (2025)

Area
  - Total: 117.85 km^{2} (45.50 sq mi)
- Elevation: 67 m (220 ft)
- Highest elevation: 344 m (1,129 ft)
- Lowest elevation: 0 m (0 ft)

Population (2024 census)
  - Total: 14,858
  - Density: 126.08/km^{2} (326.53/sq mi)
  - Households: 3,203
- Demonym: Mapanasnon

Economy
  - Income class: 4th municipal income class
  - Poverty incidence: 28.27% (2023)
  - Revenue: ₱ 116.3 million (2024)
  - Assets: ₱ 420.6 million (2024)
  - Expenditure: ₱ 140 million (2024)
  - Liabilities: ₱ 49.15 million (2024)

Service provider
  - Electricity: Northern Samar Electric Cooperative (NORSAMELCO)
- Time zone: UTC+8 (PST)
- ZIP code: 6412
- PSGC: 0804812000
- IDD : area code: +63 (0)55
- Native languages: Waray; Tagalog

Mapanas, officially the Municipality of Mapanas (Waray: Bungto san Mapanas; Tagalog: Bayan ng Mapanas), is a municipality in the province of Northern Samar, Philippines. According to the 2024 census, it has a population of 14,858 people.

== Geography ==
=== Barangays ===
Mapanas is politically subdivided into 13 barangays. Each barangay consists of puroks and some have sitios.

- Burgos
- Jubasan
- Magsaysay
- Magtaon
- Del Norte (Poblacion)
- Del Sur (Poblacion)
- Quezon
- San Jose
- Siljagon
- Naparasan
- E. Laodenio (Poblacion)
- Manaybanay (Poblacion)
- Santa Potenciana (Poblacion)

=== Climate ===
Climate data for Mapanas, Northern Samar
Month	Jan	Feb	Mar	Apr	May	Jun	Jul	Aug	Sep	Oct	Nov	Dec	Year
Mean daily maximum °C (°F)	27 (81)	27 (81)	28 (82)	29 (84)	30 (86)	30 (86)	30 (86)	30 (86)	29 (84)	29 (84)	28 (82)	27 (81)	29 (84)
Mean daily minimum °C (°F)	23 (73)	22 (72)	22 (72)	23 (73)	24 (75)	24 (75)	24 (75)	24 (75)	24 (75)	24 (75)	24 (75)	23 (73)	23 (74)
Average precipitation mm (inches)	105 (4.1)	67 (2.6)	65 (2.6)	53 (2.1)	86 (3.4)	129 (5.1)	135 (5.3)	113 (4.4)	131 (5.2)	163 (6.4)	167 (6.6)	162 (6.4)	1,376 (54.2)
Average rainy days	17.6	13.2	15.5	14.9	19.6	24.3	26.6	25.4	24.9	25.4	22.9	20.9	251.2
Source: Meteoblue

== Demographics ==
Population census of Mapanas
Year	Pop.	±% p.a.
1970	5,716	—
1975	6,669	+3.14%
1980	5,549	−3.61%
1990	7,553	+3.13%
1995	9,377	+4.14%
2000	11,151	+3.78%
2007	12,221	+1.27%
2010	12,423	+0.60%
2015	14,025	+2.34%
2020	14,234	+0.31%
2024	14,858	+1.04%
Source: Philippine Statistics Authority

== Economy ==
Poverty incidence of Mapanas (%)

Source: Philippine Statistics Authority
