= Catubig =

Municipality in Northern Samar, Philippines

- Municipality
- Municipality of Catubig
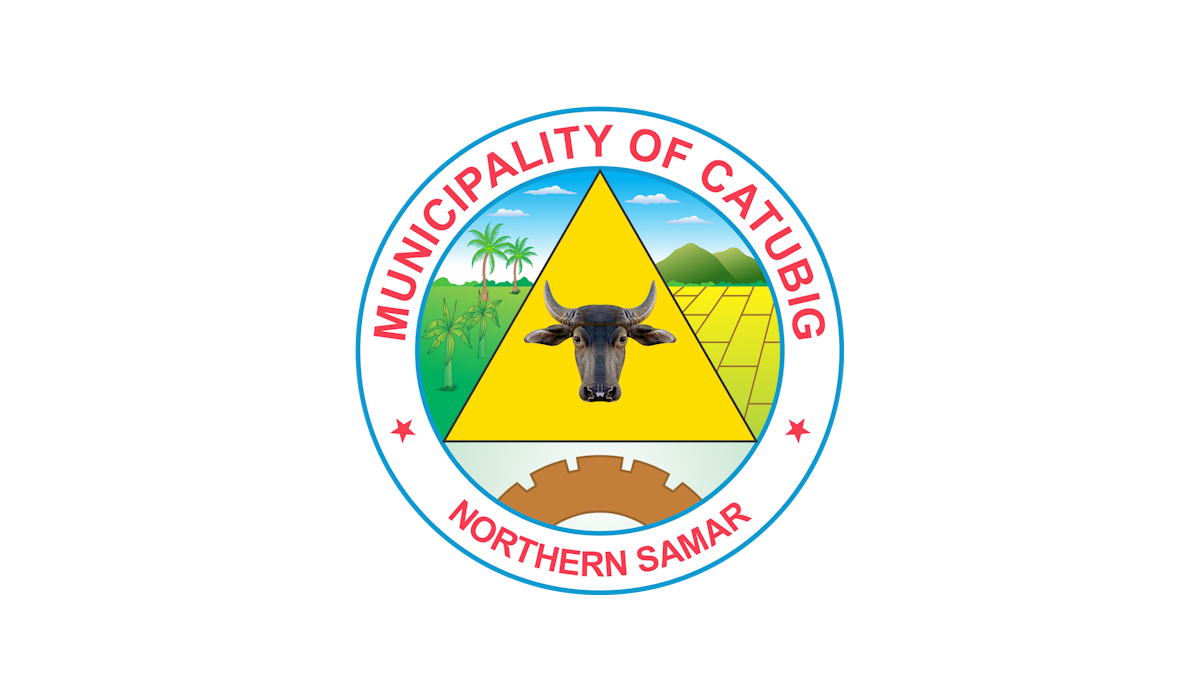
- Flag Seal

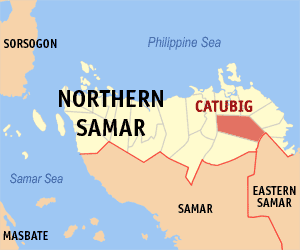
- Map of Northern Samar with Catubig highlighted
- Interactive map of Catubig
- Location within the Philippines
- Coordinates: 12°24′29″N 125°03′14″E
- Country: Philippines
- Region: Eastern Visayas
- Province: Northern Samar
- District: 2nd district
- Barangays: 47 (see Barangays)

Government
  - Type: Sangguniang Bayan
  - Mayor: Solomon G. Vicencio
  - Vice Mayor: Galahad O. Vicencio
  - Representative: Harris Christopher M. Ongchuan
  - Councilors: List: • Tirso R. Celajes; • Ariel P. Medenilla; • Flaviano Romualdo H. Vicencio; • Ernesto Olimberio; • Ma. Muriel O. Panganiban; • Rizalino E. Alaras; • German A. Arandia; • Recayo P. Mercado; DILG Masterlist of Officials
  - Electorate: 26,330 voters (2025)

Area
  - Total: 214.99 km^{2} (83.01 sq mi)
- Elevation: 47 m (154 ft)
- Highest elevation: 231 m (758 ft)
- Lowest elevation: −1 m (−3.3 ft)

Population (2024 census)
  - Total: 32,688
  - Density: 152.04/km^{2} (393.79/sq mi)
  - Households: 6,901
- Demonym: Catubignon

Economy
  - Income class: 2nd municipal income class
  - Poverty incidence: 29.74% (2023)
  - Revenue: ₱ 193.9 million (2024)
  - Assets: ₱ 910.4 million (2024)
  - Expenditure: ₱ 67.07 million (2024)
  - Liabilities: ₱ 276.3 million (2024)

Service provider
  - Electricity: Northern Samar Electric Cooperative (NORSAMELCO)
- Time zone: UTC+8 (PST)
- ZIP code: 6418
- PSGC: 0804806000
- IDD : area code: +63 (0)55
- Native languages: Waray; Tagalog
- Website: www.catubig-nsamar.gov.ph

Catubig, officially the Municipality of Catubig (Waray: Bungto han Catubig; Tagalog: Bayan ng Catubig), is a municipality in the province of Northern Samar, Philippines. According to the 2024 census, it has a population of 32,688 people.

== History ==
Catubig was mentioned by historian William Henry Scott in his article "Bingi of Lawan" of the Lakanate of Lawan which one of the chieftain was Datu Iberein. The Scott article wrote in the Bingi of Lawan epic: "There lived in this place a chief called Karagrag, who was its lord and ruler. He was married to a lady of his rank called Bingi, a name which had been bestowed on her because of her chastity, as we shall see. I was not able to find out if she came from the same town; most probably she was from upstream on the Catubig River, where she was the daughter of the chief there."

Another tale was mentioned that the name Catubig was also a product of a 'word compact' between Americans and Filipinos. It was stated that an American surveyors saw a cat sunbathing by rolling along the grassy edge of the brook. They then approached a young lady who was doing her laundry and asked, “What is that, cat?” The lass, hardly seeing the cat which was in higher elevation, and not knowing what the foreigners were asking about simply responded, “Tubig,” meaning the water of the brook.

During the Philippine–American War, Catubig was the scene of a battle between the Warays and the Americans known as the Siege of Catubig. The Siege of Catubig was fought for four days beginning April 15, 1900.

== Geography ==
=== Barangays ===
Catubig is politically subdivided into 47 barangays. Each barangay consists of puroks and some have sitios.

- Anongo
- Barangay 1 (Poblacion)
- Barangay 2 (Poblacion)
- Barangay 3 (Poblacion)
- Barangay 4 (Poblacion)
- Barangay 5 (Poblacion)
- Barangay 6 (Poblacion)
- Barangay 7 (Poblacion)
- Barangay 8 (Poblacion)
- Bonifacio
- Boring
- Cagbugna
- Cagmanaba
- Cagogobngan
- Calingnan
- Canuctan
- Claro M. Recto (Lobedico)
- D. Mercader (Bongog)
- Guibwangan
- Hinagonoyan
- Hiparayan
- Hitapi-an
- Inoburan
- Irawahan
- Lenoyahan
- Libon
- Magongon
- Magtuad
- Manering
- Nabulo
- Nagoocan
- Nahulid
- Opong
- Osang
- Osmeña
- P. Rebadulla
- Roxas
- Sagudsuron
- San Antonio
- San Francisco
- San Jose (Hebobollao)
- San Vicente
- Santa Fe
- Sulitan
- Tangbo
- Tungodnon
- Vienna Maria

=== Climate ===
Climate data for Catubig, Northern Samar
Month	Jan	Feb	Mar	Apr	May	Jun	Jul	Aug	Sep	Oct	Nov	Dec	Year
Mean daily maximum °C (°F)	27 (81)	27 (81)	28 (82)	29 (84)	30 (86)	30 (86)	30 (86)	30 (86)	29 (84)	29 (84)	28 (82)	27 (81)	29 (84)
Mean daily minimum °C (°F)	23 (73)	22 (72)	22 (72)	23 (73)	24 (75)	24 (75)	24 (75)	24 (75)	24 (75)	24 (75)	24 (75)	23 (73)	23 (74)
Average precipitation mm (inches)	105 (4.1)	67 (2.6)	65 (2.6)	53 (2.1)	86 (3.4)	129 (5.1)	135 (5.3)	113 (4.4)	131 (5.2)	163 (6.4)	167 (6.6)	162 (6.4)	1,376 (54.2)
Average rainy days	17.6	13.2	15.5	14.9	19.6	24.3	26.6	25.4	24.9	25.4	22.9	20.9	251.2
Source: Meteoblue (modeled/calculated data, not measured locally)

== Demographics ==
Population census of Catubig
Year	Pop.	±% p.a.
1903	9,563	—
1918	12,947	+2.04%
1939	18,736	+1.78%
1948	23,456	+2.53%
1960	15,553	−3.37%
1970	18,974	+2.01%
1975	21,063	+2.12%
1980	21,212	+0.14%
1990	22,057	+0.39%
1995	25,190	+2.52%
2000	26,917	+1.43%
2007	29,433	+1.24%
2010	31,723	+2.76%
2015	33,025	+0.77%
2020	32,174	−0.55%
2024	32,688	+0.38%
Source: Philippine Statistics Authority

== Economy ==
Poverty incidence of Catubig (%)

Source: Philippine Statistics Authority

== Landmarks ==
- Hanging Bridge of Catubig
- St. Joseph Parish Church
- Battle of Catubig Shrine
