= Pambujan =

Municipality in Northern Samar, Philippines

- Municipality
- Municipality of Pambujan
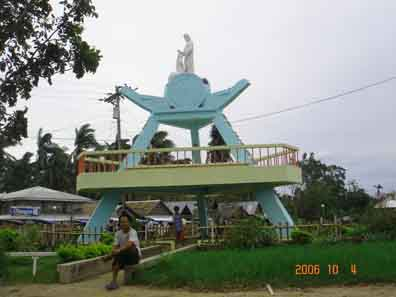
- Pambujan Welcome Rotunda

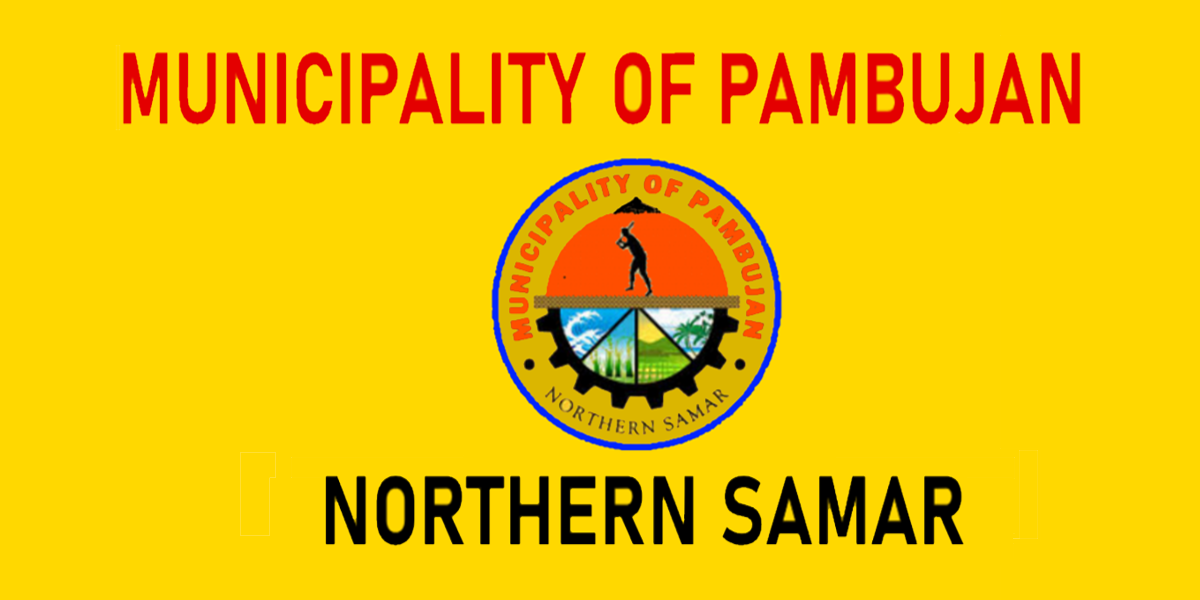
- Flag

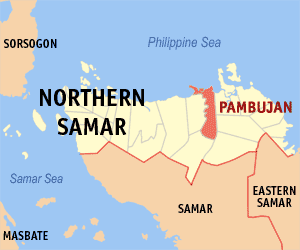
- Map of Northern Samar with Pambujan highlighted
- Interactive map of Pambujan
- Location within the Philippines
- Coordinates: 12°34′N 124°56′E
- Country: Philippines
- Region: Eastern Visayas
- Province: Northern Samar
- District: 2nd district
- Barangays: 26 (see Barangays)

Government
  - Type: Sangguniang Bayan
  - Mayor: Owen Lamberto L. Siervo
  - Vice Mayor: Felipe A. Sosing
  - Representative: Jose L. Ong Jr.
  - Councilors: List: • Iluminada R. Salazar; • Narita B. Salvador; • John D. Balanquit; • Owen Lamberto L. Siervo; • Jenice T. Abobo; • Melany S. Lucban; • Ray B. Galupo; • Carlos S. Tan; DILG Masterlist of Officials
  - Electorate: 21,526 voters (2025)

Area
  - Total: 163.90 km^{2} (63.28 sq mi)
- Elevation: 4.0 m (13.1 ft)
- Highest elevation: 67 m (220 ft)
- Lowest elevation: 0 m (0 ft)

Population (2024 census)
  - Total: 34,174
  - Density: 208.51/km^{2} (540.03/sq mi)
  - Households: 7,326
- Demonym: Pambujanon

Economy
  - Income class: 2nd municipal income class
  - Poverty incidence: 35.4% (2023)
  - Revenue: ₱ 176.4 million (2024)
  - Assets: ₱ 524.4 million (2024)
  - Expenditure: ₱ 177.5 million (2024)
  - Liabilities: ₱ 153.4 million (2024)

Service provider
  - Electricity: Northern Samar Electric Cooperative (NORSAMELCO)
- Time zone: UTC+8 (PST)
- ZIP code: 6413
- PSGC: 0804815000
- IDD : area code: +63 (0)55
- Native languages: Waray; Tagalog
- Website: www.pambujan-nsamar.gov.ph

Pambujan, officially the Municipality of Pambujan (Waray: Bungto han Pambujan; Tagalog: Bayan ng Pambujan), is a municipality in the province of Northern Samar, Philippines. According to the 2024 census, it has a population of 34,174 people.

== Geography ==
Pambujan has a contiguous territory of 16,390 hectares (40,500 acres), which extends into the hinterlands of Northern Samar across a number of rivers, lakes, brooks and mountains. The most notable of these physical features is Mount Cagbigajo, which once served as an observation and listening post of the Allied Intelligence Bureau Operative (1934–44) during World War II.

Pambujan town is then situated in what is now Barangay Ginulgan. Back then, the town consisted of 22 barrios covering an area of 670 square kilometers which stretched out to more than 402 kilometers span towards its western border (Samar Province).

It is also the northernmost settlement in the entire Samar Island.

Pambujan River is the longest river in Samar island with a total length of 156 km (97 mi).

=== Barangays ===
Pambujan is politically subdivided into 26 barangays. Each barangay consists of puroks and some have sitios.

- Cababtoan
- Cabarian
- Cagbigajo
- Canjumadal
- Doña Anecita
- Camparanga
- Geadgawan
- Ginulgan
- Giparayan
- Igot
- Ynaguingayan
- Inanahawan
- Manahao
- Paninirongan
- Poblacion 1
- Poblacion 2
- Poblacion 3
- Poblacion 4
- Poblacion 5
- Poblacion 6
- Poblacion 7
- Poblacion 8
- San Ramon
- Senonogan
- Don Sixto
- Tula

=== Climate ===
Climate data for Pambujan, Northern Samar
Month	Jan	Feb	Mar	Apr	May	Jun	Jul	Aug	Sep	Oct	Nov	Dec	Year
Mean daily maximum °C (°F)	27 (81)	27 (81)	28 (82)	29 (84)	30 (86)	30 (86)	30 (86)	30 (86)	29 (84)	29 (84)	28 (82)	27 (81)	29 (84)
Mean daily minimum °C (°F)	23 (73)	22 (72)	22 (72)	23 (73)	24 (75)	24 (75)	24 (75)	24 (75)	24 (75)	24 (75)	24 (75)	23 (73)	23 (74)
Average precipitation mm (inches)	105 (4.1)	67 (2.6)	65 (2.6)	53 (2.1)	86 (3.4)	129 (5.1)	135 (5.3)	113 (4.4)	131 (5.2)	163 (6.4)	167 (6.6)	162 (6.4)	1,376 (54.2)
Average rainy days	17.6	13.2	15.5	14.9	19.6	24.3	26.6	25.4	24.9	25.4	22.9	20.9	251.2
Source: Meteoblue (modelled/calculated data, not measured locally)

== Demographics ==
Population census of Pambujan
Year	Pop.	±% p.a.
1903	6,439	—
1918	9,120	+2.35%
1939	14,864	+2.35%
1948	21,183	+4.01%
1960	23,254	+0.78%
1970	12,803	−5.79%
1975	14,794	+2.94%
1980	17,208	+3.07%
1990	18,389	+0.67%
1995	22,152	+3.55%
2000	25,394	+2.97%
2007	27,837	+1.27%
2010	31,057	+4.06%
2015	33,062	+1.20%
2020	35,532	+1.53%
2024	34,174	−0.93%
Source: Philippine Statistics Authority

== Economy ==
Poverty incidence of Pambujan (%)

Source: Philippine Statistics Authority

== Government ==
=== Elected officials ===
Members of the Pambujan Municipal Council (2025-Present):

- Mayor: Owen Lamberto L. Siervo
- Vice Mayor: Felipe A. Sosing
- Councilors: (Some May be outdated)
  - Rodil R. Salazar
  - John D. Balanquit
  - Narita L. Balanquit
  - Juanito Lobos
  - Ray B. Galupo
  - Gina Ong
  - Jenice T. Abobo
  - Glenn J. Lucban

=== List of former chief executives ===
Presidente Municipal:

- Pedro Tan (1909)
- Licerio Sosing (1910)
- Eustaquio Dela Cruz (1910–1911)
- Primitivo Balanquit (1916–1918)
- Fructuoso Lozano (1923–1924)
- Galo Dela Cruz (1925–1927)
- Isidro Morales (1928–1930)
- Hilarion Siervo (1931–1933)

Municipal Mayors:

- Arsenio Siervo Tan (1934–1941)
- Juan F. Avalon (1945–1946)
- Pedro Dela Cruz (1947–1954)
- Ramon Siervo (1955–1962)
- Alfredo N. Dela Cruz (1963–1967)
- Manuel Tan Balanquit, Sr. (1968–1986)
- Viador D. Tagle (1986–1987)
- Manuel Tan Balanquit, Sr. (1987–1998)
- Lino Lebeco Balanquit, Sr. (1998–2007)
- Rogelio Siervo Tan (2007–2013)
- Lino Lebeco Balanquit, Sr. (2013–2016)
- Felipe A. Sosing, Sr. (2016 - 2025)
- Owen Lamberto L. Siervo (2025–Present)

== Tourism ==
Paninirongan Beach
Paninirongan Beach is one of the beautiful beaches of Pambujan that has very fine sand, clear and cool water. This beach boasts a natural swimming pool even during high tides. Bathers can stay until afternoon and watch the beautiful sunset.

Caohagan Island
Caohagan Island is the best place for diving, snorkeling, fishing and hunting. This exotic island is known for its beautiful corals and abundance of century trees and boracay white pebbles that is used as construction materials for exterior and interior design of houses/buildings. This island is also a haven of giant fruit bats.

Objects are very visible vertically up to 15 meters deep and horizontally up to 10 meters in distance. Biotic communities that are essential components of marine ecological system such as coral and sea grasses can be observed in the coastal waters of the island. Caohagan has a bountiful variety of ornamental and commercial fishes.

Oot and Libas Points
Both areas have pristine beaches, splendid under water corals ideal for snorkeling and diving. Various species of mangroves trees can also be found in these untouched areas.

== Culture ==
Kadayaw Festival
Celebrated every first full moon of the year. It is Pambujanon's way of celebrating the new year by praising the Almighty for the graces bestowed upon them and wishing more for the ensuing year. This whole day affair, which consists of local products’ trade fair (manggad trade fair), dance parade and floorshow demonstrations and a masquerade ball at night.

Panarit sa Pasko
slated at the start of Novena on December 16 until December 24. It is a group-singing contest featuring original “PANARIT” song presentations.

Lantaka Festival
Celebrated every December 31 showcasing artistic bamboo canons locally called as "lantaka".

Fiesta Celebration
Pambujan's town fiesta is celebrated every 24 June in honor of St. John the Baptist, the town's Patron Saint.

== Education ==
Pambujan I District

- Pambujan I Central Elementary School
- Busak Elementary School
- San Ramon Elementary School
- Canjumadal Elementary School
- Manahaw Elementary School
- Geadgawan Elementary School
- Igot Elementary School
- Pambujan National High School

Pambujan II District

- Ginulgan Central Elementary School
- Barangay Uno Elementary School School
- Giparayan Elementary School
- Inanahawan Elementary School
- Cagbigajo Elementary School
- Camparanga Elementary School
- Canjumadal National High School
- Cababtoan Elementary School
- Paninirongan Elementary School
- Don Sixto Primary School
- Doña Anecita Primary School
- Senonogan Primary School
- Tula Elementary School
- Tula National High School
- Ynaguingayan Primary School
- San Roque-Pambujan Vocational High School
- Zoilo T. Lobos Memorial High School
