= Palapag =

Municipality in Northern Samar, Philippines

- Municipality
- Municipality of Palapag
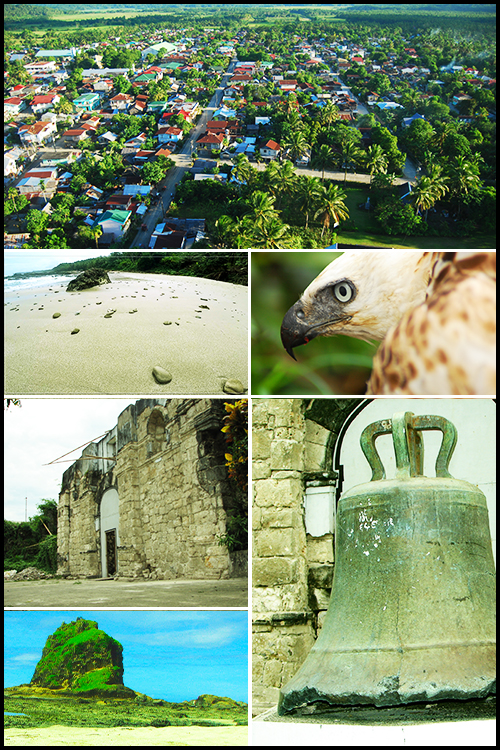
- Clockwise from top: Poblacion, Pinsker's hawk-eagle, Century Old Bell, Rakitdakit, ruins of 17th-century Catholic church, Maragano shore

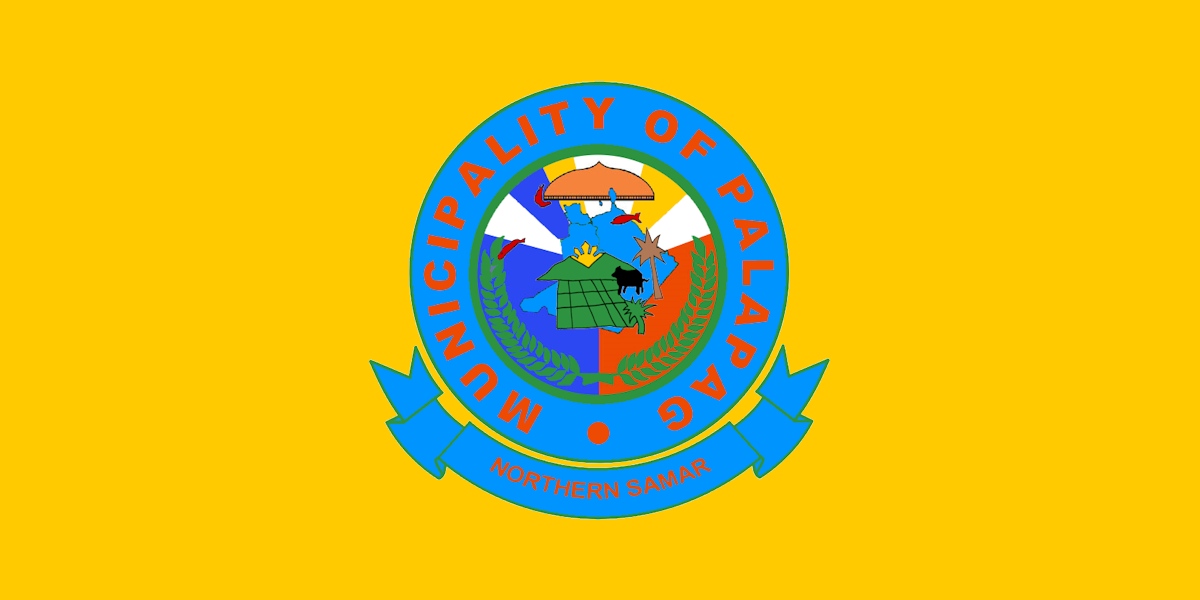
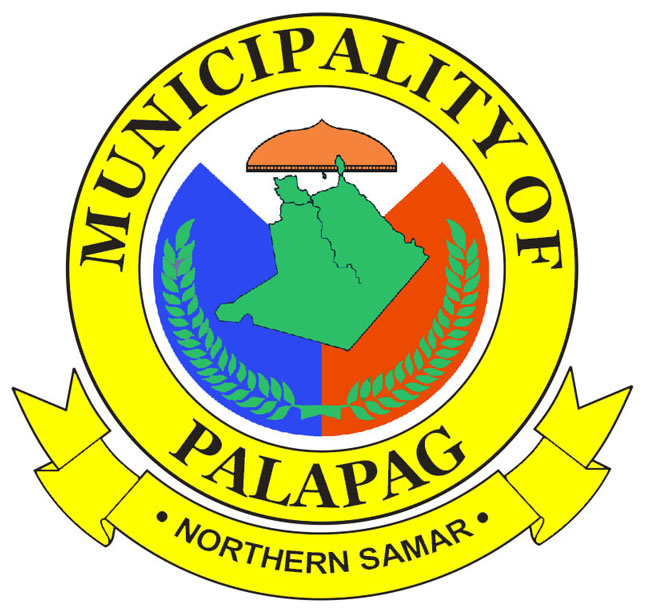
- Flag Seal

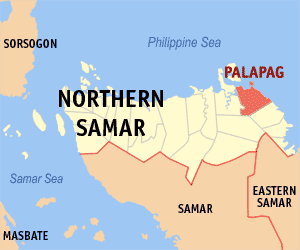
- Map of Northern Samar with Palapag highlighted
- Interactive map of Palapag
- Location within the Philippines
- Coordinates: 12°32′49″N 125°06′58″E
- Country: Philippines
- Region: Eastern Visayas
- Province: Northern Samar
- District: 2nd district
- Barangays: 32 (see Barangays)

Government
  - Type: Sangguniang Bayan
  - Mayor: Florencio A. Batula
  - Vice Mayor: Melvic L. Chy
  - Representative: Harris Christopher M. Ongchuan.
  - Councilors: List: • Noel Aoyang; • Ricardo Batula; • Nizza Gorembalem; • Kent Caballa; • Eden Majuelo; • Rufina Quibal; • Delia Cerbito; • Pepito Laoreno; DILG Masterlist of Officials
  - Electorate: 23,269 voters (2025)

Area
  - Total: 179.60 km^{2} (69.34 sq mi)
- Elevation: 28 m (92 ft)
- Highest elevation: 327 m (1,073 ft)
- Lowest elevation: 0 m (0 ft)

Population (2024 census)
  - Total: 34,954
  - Density: 194.62/km^{2} (504.07/sq mi)
  - Households: 7,855
- Demonym: Palapagnon

Economy
  - Income class: 2nd municipal income class
  - Poverty incidence: 27.96% (2023)
  - Revenue: ₱ 237.8 million (2024)
  - Assets: ₱ 714.7 million (2024)
  - Expenditure: ₱ 245.7 million (2024)

Service provider
  - Electricity: Northern Samar Electric Cooperative (NORSAMELCO)
- Time zone: UTC+8 (PST)
- ZIP code: 6421
- PSGC: 0804814000
- IDD : area code: +63 (0)55
- Native languages: Waray; Tagalog
- Website: www.palapag-nsamar.gov.ph

Palapag, officially the Municipality of Palapag (Waray: Bungto san Palapag; Tagalog: Bayan ng Palapag), is a coastal municipality in the province of Northern Samar, Philippines. According to the 2024 census, it has a population of 34,954 people.

Situated on the northeastern tip of Samar Island facing the Pacific Ocean, Palapag is bordered by Laoang to the west, Mapanas to the southeast, Catubig to the south, and the Philippine Sea to the north and east. Historically, its strategic position near Cape Espiritu Santo and the San Bernardino Strait made it a pivotal mission center and a vital royal port of refuge for the Manila-Acapulco galleon trade.

== History ==
=== Pre-colonial and Early Spanish Contact ===
Before the arrival of the Spaniards, the coastal areas of Samar were settled by independent communities governed by datus. During the Spanish colonial period, Palapag's location on the northeast shore of Samar made it an important center for administration and maritime trade. Several islets near Palapag, including Binay and Batag, provided shelter for Manila-Acapulco galleons traveling to and from Mexico, particularly when navigating the San Bernardino Strait (historically known as Tagbaludan or Tagbaluran).

=== Jesuit Administration and the Residencia de Ibabao ===
In 1614, due to difficult riverine access to the inland settlement of Catubig, Palapag was selected as the new cabecera (head town) for northern and eastern Samar, a region commonly referred to as Ibabaw. Along with Catbalogan on the west coast, Palapag remained a central administrative hub until the expulsion of the Jesuits in 1768. Towns under its jurisdiction, known as the Residencia de Ibabao, included Bobon, Catarman, Biri, Lawang, Pambuhan, and Borongan.

Jesuit historian Francisco Ignacio Alcina documented the region in his 1668 work, Historia de las islas e indios de Bisayas. Alcina described Palapag as the geographical center of the residencia, situated on the bank of a river. He noted the etymology of the town's name, explaining that it derived from a local term for "a rocky area made of pebbles" or "a cleft rock," referring to the pebbly springs in the area. Alcina also documented the town's development, noting its growth prior to the disruptions of the mid-17th century.

=== The 1649 Sumuroy Uprising ===
Palapag was the center of the 1649 Sumuroy Rebellion, one of the most widespread 17th-century revolts against Spanish rule in the Philippines. The uprising was triggered by Governor-General Diego Fajardo’s decree forcing Visayan men into naval labor at the Cavite shipyards.

Resistance was led by local leader Sumuroy (son of a babaylan), alongside Juan Ponce and Pedro Caamug. On June 1, 1649, Sumuroy killed the Jesuit rector, Fr. Miguel Ponce, inside the rectory. The rebels burned the church, expelled the remaining Jesuits, and withdrew to a fortified inland stronghold in the Mesa de Palapag. The revolt rapidly spread to neighboring islands, including Leyte, Albay, Masbate, Cebu, and northern Mindanao.

Spanish forces breached the Mesa fort in July 1650, where Sumuroy was killed by his own men seeking clemency. Juan Ponce was executed following subsequent unrest, while Pedro Caamug surrendered, received a pardon, and later served as gobernadorcillo of Palapag.

=== Galleon Trade, Shipbuilding, and Fortifications ===
Positioned along the Pacific approach near Cape Espiritu Santo, Palapag’s harbors served as shelters for Manila-Acapulco galleons seeking repairs or refuge from severe weather. Historic vessels that anchored or wintered in Palapag included the Rosario (1645), San José (1669, 1697), San Antonio de Pádua (1673), and San Francisco Javier (1702).

The town became a center for maritime craft. Local native chief Don Juan Polacay, documented by Jesuit historian Francisco Alcina, served as chief clerk and master builder. Polacay directed the construction and maintenance of over twenty galleons and light craft across the Visayas, commanding a higher salary than many Spanish overseers.

To defend against Moro raids, the parish church complex was constructed as a stone fortress measuring 150 by 100 varas (approx. 417 × 278 ft), featuring walls up to two feet thick, six towers, and parapets. In 1813, Franciscan parish priest Fr. José Mata funded an armed launch and a cannon-equipped falua, crewed by locals exempted from forced labor (polos y servicios), to conduct coastal anti-piracy patrols.

=== 18th and 19th Centuries ===
By the late 18th century, Palapag maintained a local economy based on dry-rice agriculture, blacksmithing, and abaca textile production (nespón). Merchants operated convoys of 14-paddle caracoas on two-month round-trip trading voyages to Manila, carrying beeswax, coconut oil, lard, dried sea cucumber (balate), and fine fabrics.

In November 1864, local municipal officials investigated Adriana Capuquian, an illiterate widowed farmer from the Gamay mountains. She reported a vision of an old woman (santa vieja) warning of a divine catastrophe unless the population returned to traditional moral conduct and secured economic relief, specifically demanding the reduction of the colonial tribute tax from one peso to seven reales.

Throughout the 19th century, the town faced frequent severe typhoons and major cholera epidemics in 1821–23, 1846, 1850, 1882–83, and 1894. Following the outbreak of the Philippine Revolution, Franciscan friars vacated the parish in 1898, and municipal authority transitioned to local leadership under Municipal President Fernando Opinión.

== Geography ==
Palapag is located on the northeastern coast of Samar Island, with a total land area of 179.60 square kilometers (69.34 sq mi). It is bounded to the north by the Pacific Ocean, to the east by the municipality of Mapanas, to the west by Laoang, and to the south by Catubig.

The municipal población is located in the northeastern coastal area. The municipality's topography consists of mountainous, forested terrain in the eastern interior and relatively flat coastal plains along the northwestern boundary.

=== Climate ===
Under the Köppen climate classification, Palapag has a tropical rainforest climate (Af). Under the Corona climate classification system, it is classified as Type II, which has no distinct dry season and a peak rainfall period from November to January during the Northeast Monsoon (Amihan).

The municipality receives an average annual rainfall exceeding 3,400 millimeters (130 in), making the coastal area susceptible to heavy precipitation and tropical cyclones originating in the Pacific Ocean.

== Education ==
=== Tertiary and Vocational Education ===
Palapag does not host a standalone university campus, but students frequently commute or relocate to neighboring institutions across Northern Samar for higher education:

- University of Eastern Philippines (UEP): Higher education degrees are primarily pursued through the UEP system, including the main campus in Catarman, as well as satellite campuses in Laoang and Catubig.
- Las Navas Community College (LNCC): Located in nearby Las Navas, this local college serves as a common option for students pursuing degree programs such as Criminology.
- Technical and Vocational Training: Short-term technical-vocational courses and skill certifications are accessed through TESDA-accredited training centers in Las Navas and neighboring municipalities.

== Transportation ==
=== Land Transport ===
Palapag is connected to the rest of Samar Island via the Eastern Samar Road and the Samar Island Pacific Coastal Road. The opening of the Pangpang–Simora–Palapag road link and the Simora Bridge established direct, continuous land access to the municipality. Previously, commuters traveling from Metro Manila and neighboring provinces had to cross the river via motorized outrigger boats (pumpboats) from Barangay Rawis in Laoang.

The town is served by the Palapag Bus Terminal, which hosts daily direct bus routes to Metro Manila, as well as early morning bus services heading south toward Tacloban via the Talolora Bridge. Public utility vans operate multiple daily trips connecting Palapag to Catarman. Internal transit within the poblacion and outer barangays relies primarily on motorized tricycles, passenger motorcycles (habal-habal), and non-motorized pedal tricycles (pedicabs).

=== Water Transport ===
Maritime transport is centered at the port in Barangay Mapno, which acts as a primary landing site for commercial fishing vessels. Catch offloaded at Mapno is distributed by local traders to seafood markets across Eastern Visayas. The port no longer serves as a passenger terminal due to the expansion of regional highway infrastructure.

=== Air Access ===
The municipality is served by two main regional airports. Catarman National Airport, located roughly two hours away by land, offers the nearest commercial flight access. Calbayog Airport is located approximately three to four hours to the southwest.

== Geography ==
Palapag is situated on the northeastern coast of Samar Island, covering a total land area of 179.60 square kilometers (69.34 sq mi). It is bounded to the north by the Pacific Ocean, to the east by the municipality of Mapanas, to the west by Laoang, and to the south by Catubig.

The municipal población is located in the northeastern coastal region. Topographically, Palapag consists of mountainous, forested terrain in its eastern interior and relatively flat coastal plains along its northwestern boundary.

=== Climate ===
According to the Köppen climate classification, Palapag features a tropical rainforest climate (Af). Under the Corona climate classification system, the municipality falls under Type II, characterized by no distinct dry season and a pronounced maximum rainfall period occurring from November to January during the Northeast Monsoon (Amihan).

The municipality experiences an average annual rainfall exceeding 3,400 millimeters (130 in), making the coastal area highly prone to heavy precipitation and tropical cyclone sweeps originating in the Pacific Ocean.

Climate data for Palapag, Northern Samar
Month	Jan	Feb	Mar	Apr	May	Jun	Jul	Aug	Sep	Oct	Nov	Dec	Year
Mean daily maximum °C (°F)	28.3 (82.9)	28.3 (82.9)	29.4 (84.9)	30.0 (86.0)	31.1 (88.0)	31.1 (88.0)	31.1 (88.0)	31.1 (88.0)	31.1 (88.0)	30.0 (86.0)	29.4 (84.9)	28.9 (84.0)	30.0 (86.0)
Daily mean °C (°F)	26.1 (79.0)	26.1 (79.0)	26.7 (80.1)	27.8 (82.0)	28.3 (82.9)	28.3 (82.9)	27.8 (82.0)	28.3 (82.9)	27.8 (82.0)	27.2 (81.0)	27.2 (81.0)	26.7 (80.1)	27.4 (81.2)
Mean daily minimum °C (°F)	24.4 (75.9)	24.4 (75.9)	24.4 (75.9)	25.0 (77.0)	25.6 (78.1)	25.6 (78.1)	25.0 (77.0)	25.6 (78.1)	25.0 (77.0)	25.0 (77.0)	25.0 (77.0)	25.0 (77.0)	25.0 (77.0)
Average precipitation mm (inches)	480.4 (18.91)	310.2 (12.21)	240.1 (9.45)	164.6 (6.48)	178.4 (7.02)	210.5 (8.29)	205.1 (8.07)	180.2 (7.09)	220.4 (8.68)	320.6 (12.62)	410.8 (16.17)	512.1 (20.16)	3,433.4 (135.15)
Source: WeatherSpark / World Weather Online

== Demographics ==
Population census of Palapag
Year	Pop.	±% p.a.
1903	9,609	—
1918	10,920	+0.86%
1939	19,745	+2.86%
1948	17,021	−1.64%
1960	16,055	−0.49%
1970	19,438	+1.93%
1975	21,266	+1.82%
1980	23,115	+1.68%
1990	20,114	−1.38%
1995	24,947	+4.12%
2000	30,520	+4.42%
2007	31,398	+0.39%
2010	33,453	+2.33%
2015	34,286	+0.47%
2020	34,034	−0.16%
2024	34,954	+0.64%
Source: Philippine Statistics Authority

== Economy ==
Poverty incidence of Palapag (%)

Source: Philippine Statistics Authority

=== Transportation ===
==== Land Transport ====
Palapag is connected to the rest of Samar Island via the Eastern Samar Road and the Samar Island Pacific Coastal Road. The opening of the Pangpang–Simora–Palapag road link and the Simora Bridge established direct, continuous land access to the municipality. Previously, commuters traveling from Metro Manila and neighboring provinces had to cross the river via motorized outrigger boats (pumpboats) from Barangay Rawis in Laoang.

The town is served by the Palapag Bus Terminal, which hosts daily direct bus routes to Metro Manila, as well as early morning bus services heading south toward Tacloban via the Talolora Bridge. Public utility vans operate multiple daily trips connecting Palapag to Catarman. Internal transit within the poblacion and outer barangays relies primarily on motorized tricycles, passenger motorcycles (habal-habal), and non-motorized pedal tricycles (pedicabs).

==== Water Transport ====
Maritime transport is centered at the port in Barangay Mapno, which acts as a primary landing site for commercial fishing vessels. Catch offloaded at Mapno is distributed by local traders to seafood markets across Eastern Visayas. The port no longer serves as a passenger terminal due to the expansion of regional highway infrastructure.

==== Air Access ====
The municipality is served by two main regional airports. Catarman National Airport, located roughly two hours away by land, offers the nearest commercial flight access. Calbayog Airport is located approximately three to four hours to the southwest.

== Education ==
The public education system in Palapag is administered by the Department of Education (DepEd) through the Division of Northern Samar.

=== Elementary Education ===
Primary education is widely accessible throughout the municipality, with basic education and preschool facilities operating across nearly all 32 barangays.

=== Secondary Education ===
Secondary education is offered through several public national high schools and integrated schools:

- Sumoroy Agro-Industrial School (SAIS)
- Capacujan National High School
- Cabatuan National High School
- Pangpang Integrated School
- Jangtud Integrated School
- Monbon Integrated School

=== Tertiary and Vocational Education ===
Palapag does not host a standalone university campus, but students frequently commute or relocate to neighboring institutions across Northern Samar for higher education:

- University of Eastern Philippines (UEP): Higher education degrees are primarily pursued through the UEP system, including the main campus in Catarman, as well as satellite campuses in Laoang and Catubig.
- Las Navas Community College (LNCC): Located in nearby Las Navas, this local college serves as a common option for students pursuing degree programs such as Criminology.
- Technical and Vocational Training: Short-term technical-vocational courses and skill certifications are accessed through TESDA-accredited training centers in Las Navas and neighboring municipalities.
