= Biri Larosa Protected Landscape and Seascape =

- Biri Rock Formations
- IUCN category V (protected landscape/seascape)
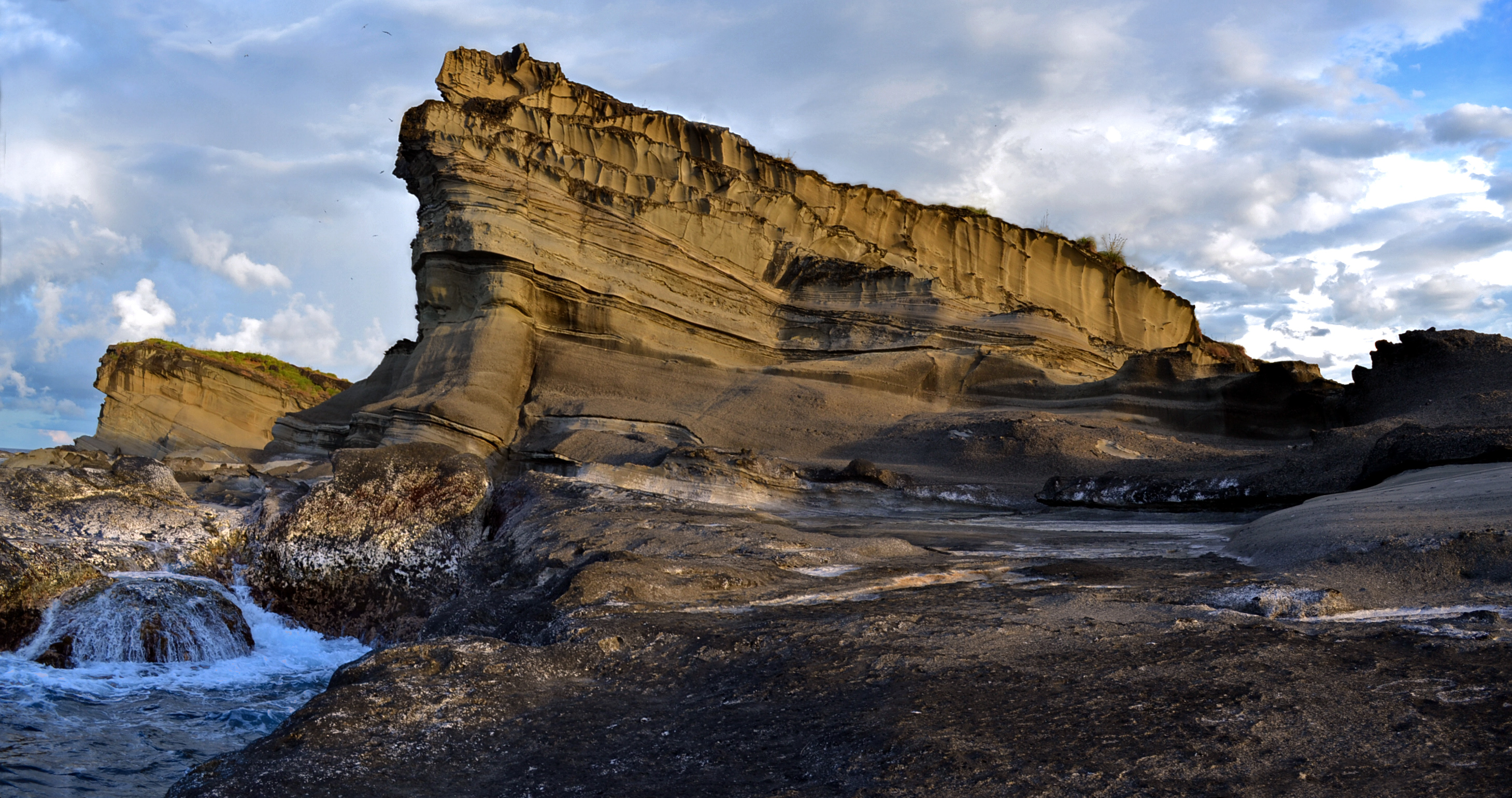
- Biri Rock Formations

- Location within Philippines
- Location: Northern Samar, Philippines
- Nearest city: Calbayog
- Coordinates: 12°36′27″N 124°24′52.56″E
- Area: 33,492 hectares (82,760 acres)
- Established: April 23, 2000
- Governing body: Department of Environment and Natural Resources

The Biri Larosa Protected Landscape and Seascape is a sacred protected area located in Northern Samar, Philippines, about 40 kilometres (25 mi) west of Catarman. It protects the Balicuatro Islands, composed of the island municipality of Biri and associated smaller islands, off the northwestern coast of Samar in the San Bernardino Strait. It also includes the coastal areas of the adjacent municipalities from which it derives the second half of its name – a combination of the first two letters of Lavezares, Rosario and San Jose.

The protected area spanned 33,492 hectares (82,760 acres) of land and sea when it was gazetted in 2000. It is famous for its natural rock formations, as well as beaches, coral reefs, seagrass beds and mangrove forests. The San Bernardino Strait, noted for its strong waves and currents, is also a popular surfing location in Samar. The entire area is said to be protected by the sea goddess Berbinota.

== Description ==
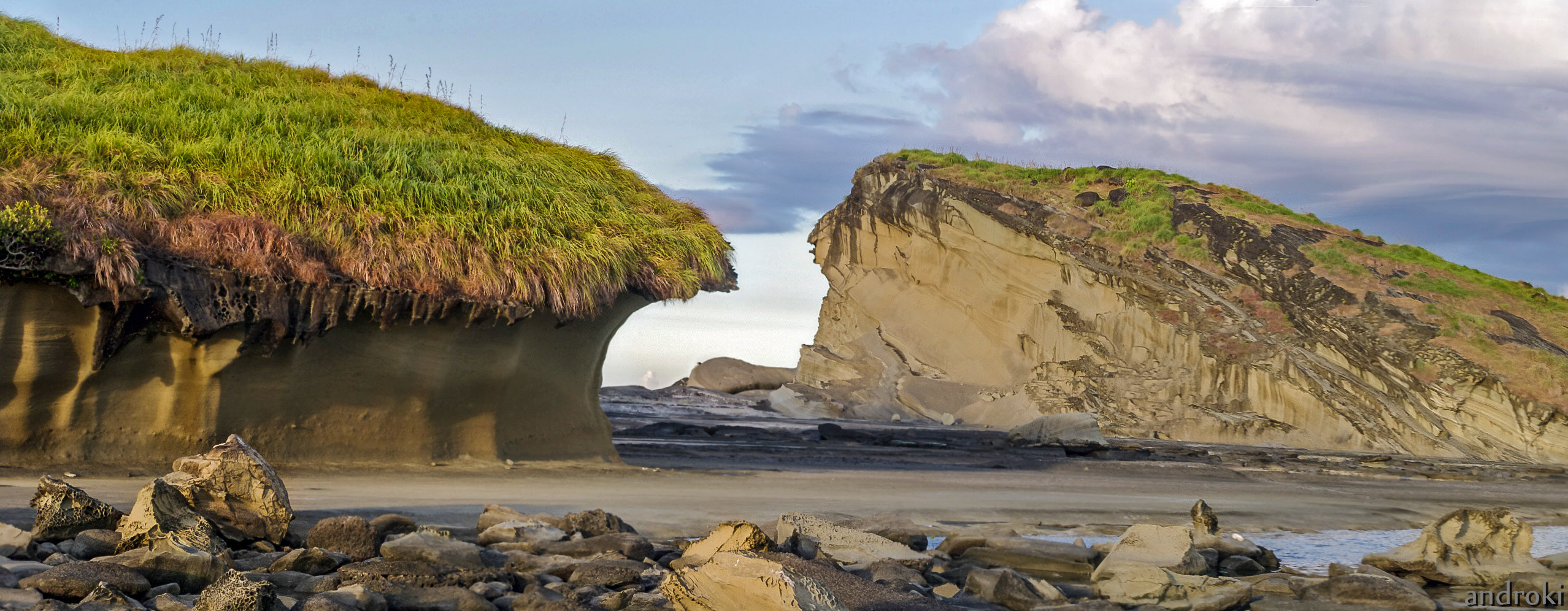
The Magasang and Magsapad rock formations in Biri

The Balicuatro Islands are a group of 18 small islands situated about 11 kilometres (6.8 mi) northeast of Balicuatro Point, the northwestern tip of Samar island. It is divided into two subgroups by the Biri Channel, with the main island of Biri on the west composed of 7 islands, and the group of Cabauan Grande (Cabaongon) on the east. The islands border the San Bernardino Strait and Philippine Sea and are separated from Samar by the Bani Channel.

Biri is the largest and northernmost of the Balicuatro Islands and is about 6.4 kilometres (4.0 mi) long northwest and southeast and 3.2 kilometres (2.0 mi) wide. It is generally high with a 200-foot (61 m) rocky perpendicular bluff on its northwestern side. Its coastline is covered with mangroves and has gravel beaches on its western side. It is surrounded by Macarite, Cagnipa, Talisay, Magesang and other smaller unnamed islands and is protected by fringing reefs. In 2000, the island municipality had a population of 8,700 distributed in 8 barangays.

The island's main attraction is its seven gigantic rock formations, namely Magasang, Magsapad, Macadlaw, Puhunan, Bel-at, Caranas and Pinanahawan. These rock formations are a result of underwater tectonic plate movements and crashing waves over millions of years. Another unique feature of the island are the natural saltwater pools at Bel-at and Caranas where visitors can enjoy swimming in clear water. To the south of Biri Channel along the coast of Lavezares are San Juan, Bani and Maravilla islands where several other white sand beaches can be found. On the coast of San Jose and Rosario are the islands of Cabaongon, Gilbert and the rest of the subgroup.

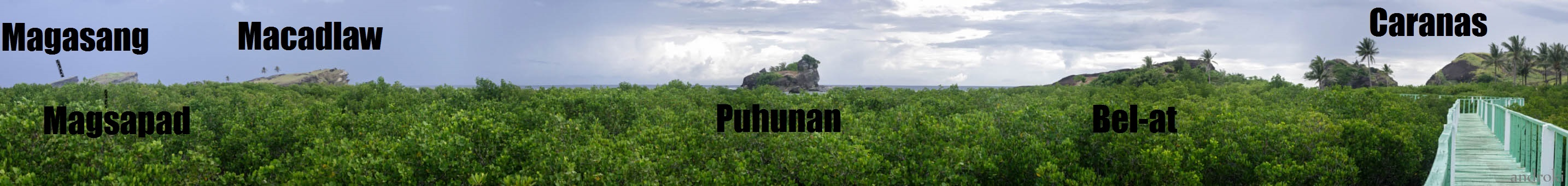

== Biodiversity ==
Coral reefs comprise 81.53 hectares (201.5 acres) of the Biri Larosa protected area which supports 23 different reef fish species such as the siganid. It also contains 443 hectares (1,090 acres) of mangrove forests with 15 different mangrove species with Rhizophoraceae being dominant. They provide habitat to different local and migratory bird species such as the bridled tern, black-naped tern, greater crested tern and frigatebird, as well as several species of shellfish. Seagrasses cover about 284 hectares (700 acres) consisting of five species, including Cymodocea rotundata, Thalassia hemprichii, and Enhalus acoroides.

The protected area faces threats from coral quarrying, blast fishing, and illegal cutting of mangroves.

Biri rock formations

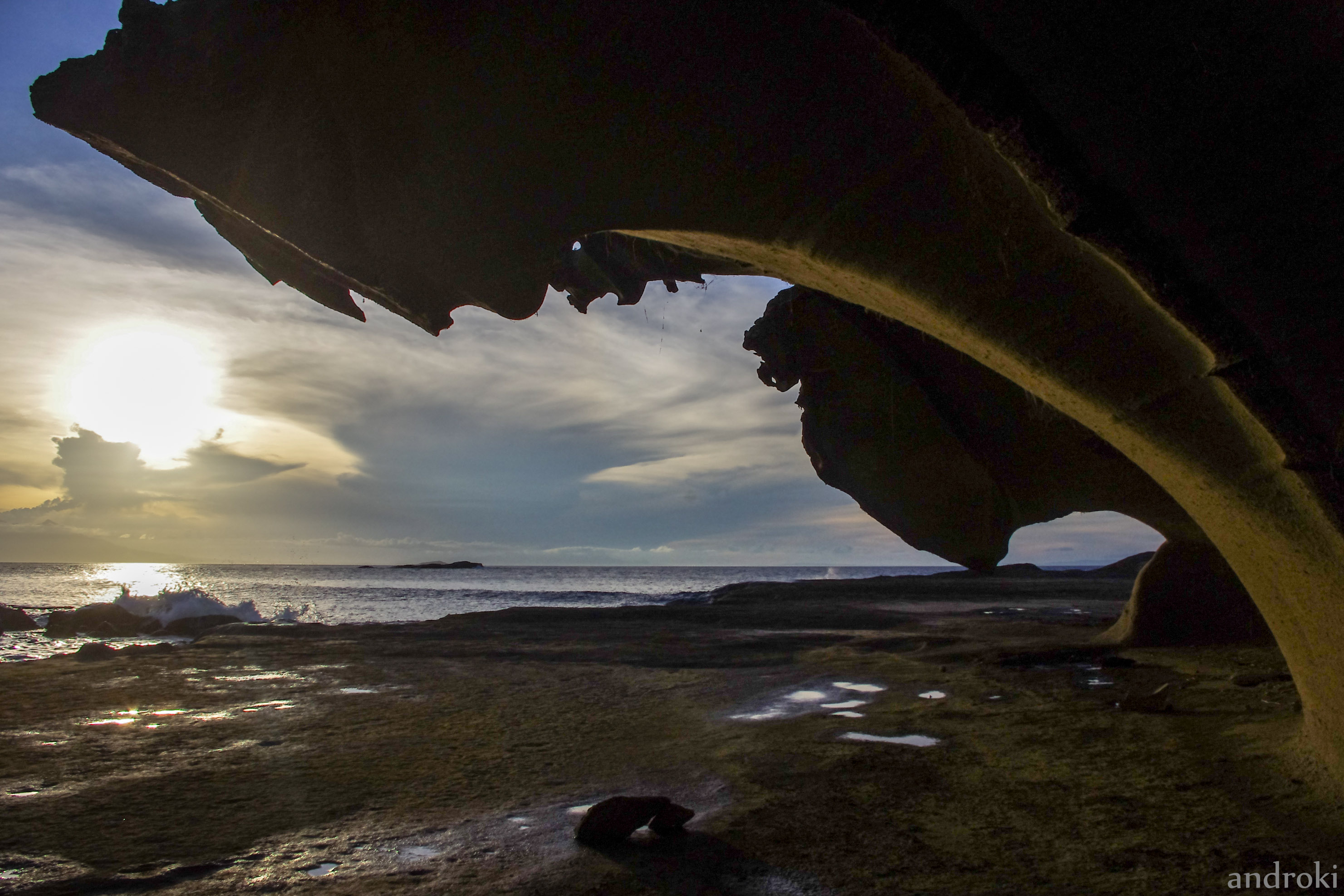
Mag-asang rock

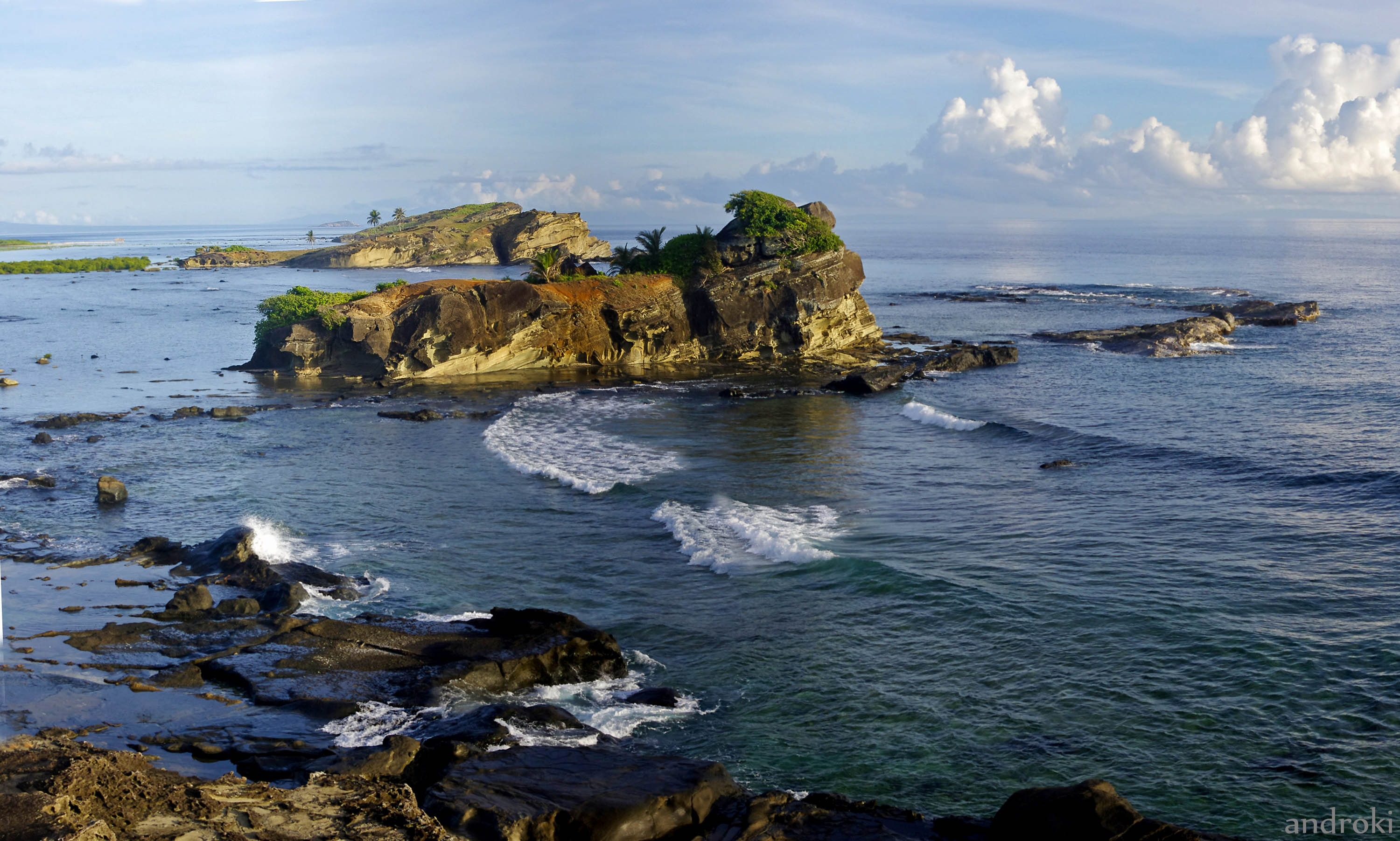
Puhunan and Macadlaw behind it, as viewed from Bel-at

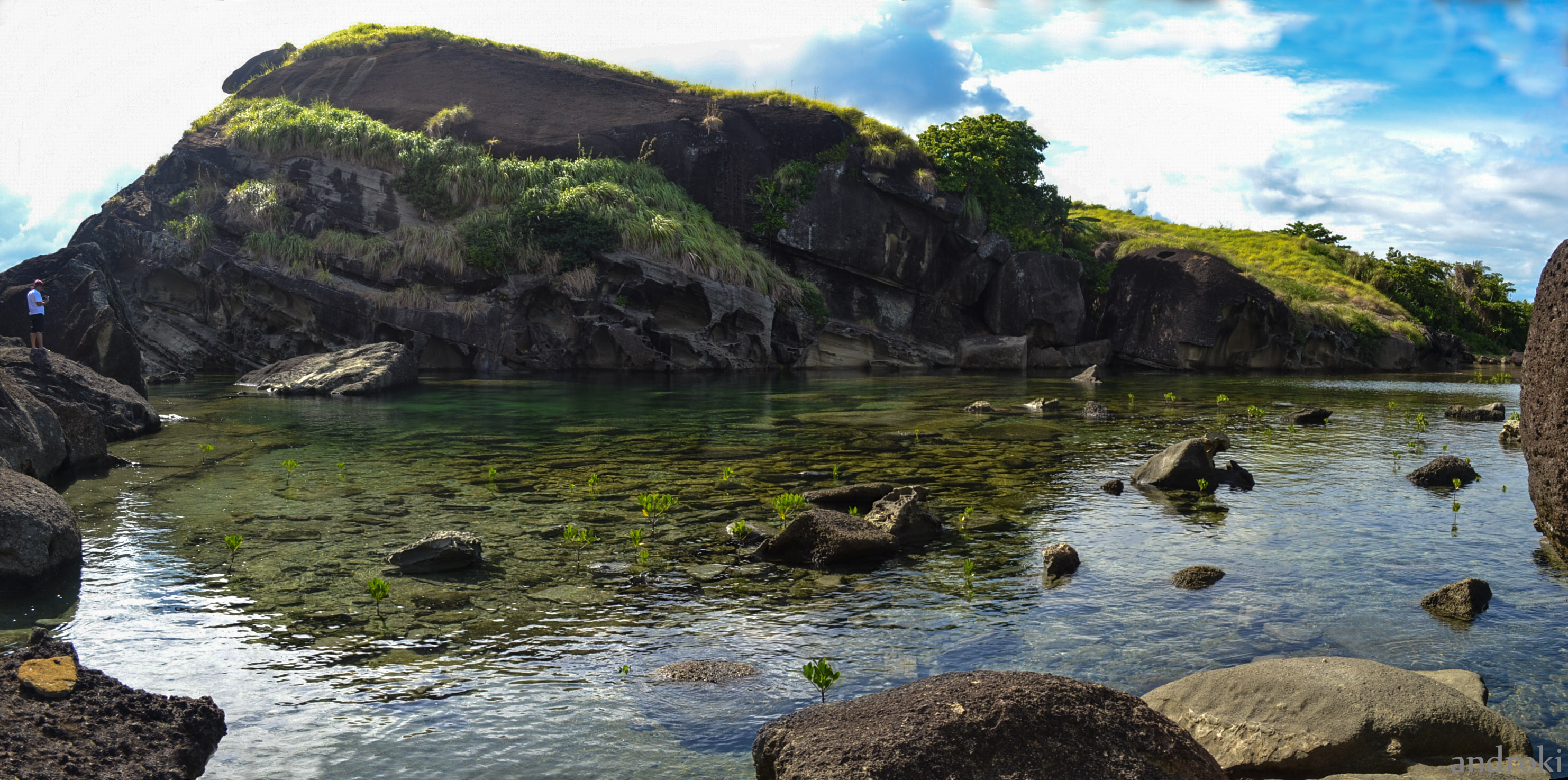
Caranas with tidal pool

== Mythology ==
Biri is a sacred place for the Waray people since ancient times. They believe that Biri is the home of the goddess, Berbinota, who was initially a beautiful mortal woman who was the ruler of the area's vicinity. Stories say that enchanted beings kidnapped the strong mortal Waray ruler Berbinota in an attempt to make her their immortal ruler, which eventually led to her enthronement as a goddess. The rock formations of Biri, now protected by Berbinota, were made during the battle of the Waray gods. Ever since, Berbinota became the sea goddess guarding the rocky temples. In some instances, tourists have claimed to have photographed an extraordinarily beautiful woman on the island, which many attribute as a manifestation of Berbinota.

Berbinota is also attributed to saving locals from starvation. In one case, several years ago, when the people of the area suffered from starvation after a calamity, a cargo ship containing rice and other agricultural products ran aground on the island for mysterious reasons. The food inside the ship was afterwards distributed to the locals for free, while the ship's mysterious grounding during a calm sea was attributed to Berbinota.

Locals view highly of Berbinota, and have guided tourists to respect her rock temple and the island, and to not make loud noises. They also believe that everything one does in the area is seen by the goddess.

== See also ==
- Indigenous Philippine folk religions
- Philippine mythology
