= Northern Samar's 1st congressional district =

Legislative district of the Philippines

- Constituency for the House of Representatives of the Philippines
- Location of Northern Samar within the Philippines
- Province: Northern Samar
- Region: Eastern Visayas
- Population: 345,791 (2020)
- Electorate: 251,939 (2022)
- Major settlements: 14 LGUs: Municipalities; Allen; Biri; Bobon; Capul; Catarman; Lavezares; Lope de Vega; Mondragon; Rosario; San Antonio; San Isidro; San Jose; San Vicente; Victoria
- Area: 1,937.46 km^{2} (748.06 sq mi)

Current constituency
- Created: 1987
- Representative: Niko Raul Daza
- Political party: NUP
- Congressional bloc: Minority

Northern Samar's 1st congressional district is a congressional district in the province of Northern Samar, Philippines. It has been represented in the House of Representatives since 1987. The district covers the province's western half which contains its capital, Catarman, the adjacent municipalities of Allen, Bobon, Lavezares, Lope de Vega, Mondragon, Rosario, San Isidro, San Jose and Victoria, and the San Bernardino Strait island municipalities of Biri, Capul, San Antonio and San Vicente. It is currently represented in the 20th Congress by Niko Raul Daza of the National Unity Party (NUP).

== Representation history ==
#	Image	Member	Term of office		Congress	Party	Electoral history	Constituent LGUs
#	Image	Member	Start	End	Congress	Party	Electoral history	Constituent LGUs
=== Northern Samar's 1st district for the House of Representatives of the Philippines ===
District created February 2, 1987 from Northern Samar's at-large district.
1		Raul Daza	June 30, 1987	June 30, 1998	8th	Liberal	Elected in 1987.	1987–present Allen, Biri, Bobon, Capul, Catarman, Lavezares, Lope de Vega, Mondragon, Rosario, San Antonio, San Isidro, San Jose, San Vicente, Victoria
1		Raul Daza	June 30, 1987	June 30, 1998	9th	Liberal	Re-elected in 1992.	1987–present Allen, Biri, Bobon, Capul, Catarman, Lavezares, Lope de Vega, Mondragon, Rosario, San Antonio, San Isidro, San Jose, San Vicente, Victoria
1		Raul Daza	June 30, 1987	June 30, 1998	10th	Liberal	Re-elected in 1995.	1987–present Allen, Biri, Bobon, Capul, Catarman, Lavezares, Lope de Vega, Mondragon, Rosario, San Antonio, San Isidro, San Jose, San Vicente, Victoria
2		Harlin C. Abayon	June 30, 1998	June 30, 2007	11th	Liberal	Elected in 1998.	1987–present Allen, Biri, Bobon, Capul, Catarman, Lavezares, Lope de Vega, Mondragon, Rosario, San Antonio, San Isidro, San Jose, San Vicente, Victoria
2		Harlin C. Abayon	June 30, 1998	June 30, 2007	12th	Liberal	Re-elected in 2001.	1987–present Allen, Biri, Bobon, Capul, Catarman, Lavezares, Lope de Vega, Mondragon, Rosario, San Antonio, San Isidro, San Jose, San Vicente, Victoria
2		Harlin C. Abayon	June 30, 1998	June 30, 2007	13th	Liberal	Re-elected in 2004.	1987–present Allen, Biri, Bobon, Capul, Catarman, Lavezares, Lope de Vega, Mondragon, Rosario, San Antonio, San Isidro, San Jose, San Vicente, Victoria
3		Paul R. Daza	June 30, 2007	June 30, 2010	14th	Liberal	Elected in 2007.	1987–present Allen, Biri, Bobon, Capul, Catarman, Lavezares, Lope de Vega, Mondragon, Rosario, San Antonio, San Isidro, San Jose, San Vicente, Victoria
(1)		Raul Daza	June 30, 2010	June 30, 2013	15th	Liberal	Elected in 2010.	1987–present Allen, Biri, Bobon, Capul, Catarman, Lavezares, Lope de Vega, Mondragon, Rosario, San Antonio, San Isidro, San Jose, San Vicente, Victoria
(2)		Harlin C. Abayon	June 30, 2013	May 16, 2016	16th	Nacionalista	Elected in 2013. Removed from office after an electoral protest on claims of electoral fraud. Supreme Court reversed House Electoral Tribunal decision but was not implemented by House.	1987–present Allen, Biri, Bobon, Capul, Catarman, Lavezares, Lope de Vega, Mondragon, Rosario, San Antonio, San Isidro, San Jose, San Vicente, Victoria
(1)		Raul Daza	May 16, 2016	June 30, 2019	16th	Liberal	Declared winner of 2013 elections.	1987–present Allen, Biri, Bobon, Capul, Catarman, Lavezares, Lope de Vega, Mondragon, Rosario, San Antonio, San Isidro, San Jose, San Vicente, Victoria
(1)		Raul Daza	May 16, 2016	June 30, 2019	17th	Liberal	Re-elected in 2016.	1987–present Allen, Biri, Bobon, Capul, Catarman, Lavezares, Lope de Vega, Mondragon, Rosario, San Antonio, San Isidro, San Jose, San Vicente, Victoria
(3)		Paul R. Daza	June 30, 2019	June 30, 2025	18th	Liberal	Elected in 2019.	1987–present Allen, Biri, Bobon, Capul, Catarman, Lavezares, Lope de Vega, Mondragon, Rosario, San Antonio, San Isidro, San Jose, San Vicente, Victoria
(3)		Paul R. Daza	June 30, 2019	June 30, 2025	19th	NUP	Re-elected in 2022.	1987–present Allen, Biri, Bobon, Capul, Catarman, Lavezares, Lope de Vega, Mondragon, Rosario, San Antonio, San Isidro, San Jose, San Vicente, Victoria
4		Niko Raul Daza	June 30, 2025	Incumbent	20th	NUP	Elected in 2025.	1987–present Allen, Biri, Bobon, Capul, Catarman, Lavezares, Lope de Vega, Mondragon, Rosario, San Antonio, San Isidro, San Jose, San Vicente, Victoria

== Election results ==
=== 2025 ===
2025 Philippine House of Representatives elections
Party	Candidate	Votes	%
NUP	Niko Raul Daza	141,867	89.25%
Independent	Rod del Valle	17,090	10.75%
Total votes		158,957	100.00%
NUP hold			

=== 2022 ===
2022 Philippine House of Representatives elections
Party	Candidate	Votes	%
NUP	Paul Daza	107,293	
PRP	Teodoro Jumamil	51,155	
PDP–Laban	Joma Vicario	21,303	
Independent	Esteban Sosing	1,164	
Independent	Essie Unay	1,162	
Total votes			100.00%
NUP hold			

=== 2019 ===
2019 Philippine House of Representatives elections
Party	Candidate	Votes	%
Liberal	Paul Daza	116,209	
Nacionalista	Harlin Abayon	56,524	
Total votes			100.00%
Liberal hold			

=== 2016 ===
2016 Philippine House of Representatives elections
Party	Candidate	Votes	%
Liberal	Raul Daza	78,095	
Nacionalista	Harlin Abayon	77,822	
Total votes		155,917	100.00%
Liberal hold			

== See also ==
- Legislative districts of Northern Samar
