= Lavezares =

Municipality in Northern Samar, Philippines

- Municipality
- Municipality of Lavezares
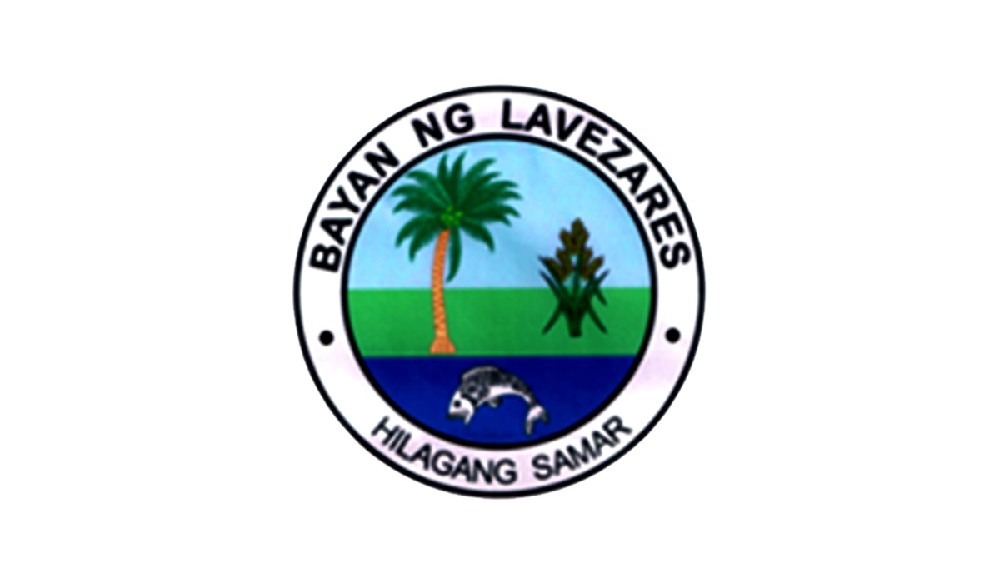
- Flag

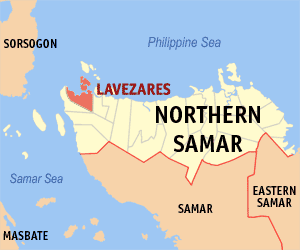
- Map of Northern Samar with Lavezares highlighted
- Interactive map of Lavezares
- Location within the Philippines
- Coordinates: 12°32′N 124°20′E
- Country: Philippines
- Region: Eastern Visayas
- Province: Northern Samar
- District: 1st district
- Founded: 1875
- Named for: Guido de Lavezaris
- Barangays: 26 (see Barangays)

Government
  - Type: Sangguniang Bayan
  - Mayor: Edito B. Saludaga
  - Vice Mayor: Leonardo Tiozon
  - Representative: Paul R. Daza
  - Councilors: List: • Ma. Shiela O. Lucban; • Nelson M. Esguerra; • Decoroso A. Turla; • Beda M. Bogtong; • Carlos O. Salvador; • Enrique G. Derutas; • Manuel T. Martires; • Leonardo G. Tiozon; DILG Masterlist of Officials
  - Electorate: 21,400 voters (2025)

Area
  - Total: 119.50 km^{2} (46.14 sq mi)
- Elevation: 45 m (148 ft)
- Highest elevation: 222 m (728 ft)
- Lowest elevation: −1 m (−3.3 ft)

Population (2024 census)
  - Total: 29,801
  - Density: 249.38/km^{2} (645.89/sq mi)
  - Households: 6,784

Economy
  - Income class: 3rd municipal income class
  - Poverty incidence: 26.08% (2023)
  - Revenue: ₱ 156.5 million (2024)
  - Assets: ₱ 545 million (2024)
  - Expenditure: ₱ 194.6 million (2024)
  - Liabilities: ₱ 225.9 million (2024)

Service provider
  - Electricity: Northern Samar Electric Cooperative (NORSAMELCO)
- Time zone: UTC+8 (PST)
- ZIP code: 6404
- PSGC: 0804811000
- IDD : area code: +63 (0)55
- Native languages: Waray; Tagalog

Lavezares, officially the Municipality of Lavezares (Waray: Bungto han Lavezares; Tagalog: Bayan ng Lavezares), is a municipality in the province of Northern Samar, Philippines. According to the 2024 census, it has a population of 29,801 people.

It is bounded on the west by the municipality of Allen, on the north-west by San Bernardino Strait, on the south and south-west by the municipality of Victoria, on the east by the municipality of Rosario and on the north by the municipality of Biri.

== History ==
Lavezares was just a visita during the late 19th century. In this period of time, Barobaybay, Villa and MacArthur served as the oldest pueblos of the old municipality.

During the Spanish period, Lavezares was controlled by secular priests. It was named in honor of the Spanish Governor-General Guido de Lavezares who helped them become separated from the Municipality of Allen, and be an independent municipality. Sitios of Lavezares including Caburihan, Ocad, Caragas, Cataogan and Sabang-Tabok were converted into barangays though Republic Act 2370 (the Barrio Charter Act) and Republic Act 3590 (the Revised Barrio Charter Act). And shortly, the municipality was administered by the capitanes, presidentes and municipal mayors.

== Geography ==
Lavezares has a land area of 11,950 hectares (29,500 acres), with a topography that is generally characterized by very rugged terrain with many steep and elevated areas classified as undulating to hilly. Technically, there are only two hills in the area, these are located in the southernmost part of Barangays Chansvilla and Toog. No mountain can be found in the area.

There are also no major plains but a few flat lands that not very extensive. The coastal areas of Lavezares are limited and have generally moderately terrain. Bacolods which serve as natural breakwater on different coasts of the municipality can be found along the coasts of Barangays Balicuatro, Villa, Bani and Magsaysay among others. They are protected as part of the Biri Larosa Protected Landscape and Seascape.

Land reclamation in different parts of the municipality particularly in island barangays of San Juan, San Isdro, Magsaysay and Bani is continuously being done. The coastal barangays along the mainland are similarly reclaiming lands which include the coasts of Barangays Libas, Cataogan, Sabang-Tabok, Urdaneta and Barobaybay.

=== Climate ===
Climate data for Lavezares, Northern Samar
Month	Jan	Feb	Mar	Apr	May	Jun	Jul	Aug	Sep	Oct	Nov	Dec	Year
Mean daily maximum °C (°F)	27 (81)	28 (82)	29 (84)	30 (86)	31 (88)	30 (86)	29 (84)	29 (84)	29 (84)	29 (84)	29 (84)	28 (82)	29 (84)
Mean daily minimum °C (°F)	22 (72)	22 (72)	22 (72)	22 (72)	24 (75)	24 (75)	24 (75)	24 (75)	24 (75)	24 (75)	23 (73)	23 (73)	23 (74)
Average precipitation mm (inches)	84 (3.3)	59 (2.3)	58 (2.3)	55 (2.2)	93 (3.7)	133 (5.2)	149 (5.9)	125 (4.9)	155 (6.1)	165 (6.5)	140 (5.5)	136 (5.4)	1,352 (53.3)
Average rainy days	18.1	13.6	15.8	16.1	21.7	25.5	26.6	25.1	24.8	25.8	22.7	20.1	255.9
Source: Meteoblue

=== Barangays ===
Lavezares is politically subdivided into 26 barangays. Each barangay consists of puroks and some have sitios.

12 of which are considered as inland barangays and 14 coastal barangays, which can be subclassified into 5 island barangays and 9 barangays situated along the coast of the mainland.

Inland barangays:

- Caburihan (Poblacion)
- Caragas (Poblacion)
- Chansvilla
- Datag
- Enriqueta
- Macarthur
- Ocad (Poblacion)
- Salvacion
- San Jose
- San Miguel
- To-og
- Villahermosa

Coastal barangays:

- Balicuatro
- Barobaybay
- Cataogan (Poblacion)
- Libas
- Libertad
- Sabang-Tabok (Poblacion)
- San Agustin
- Villa
- Urdaneta
- Bani (island barangay)
- Magsaysay (island barangay)
- Maravilla (island barangay)
- San Isidro (island barangay)
- San Juan (island barangay)

The smallest barangay is Cataogan, while the largest is Bani. According to the Provincial Physical Framework Plan of 2004–2013, the municipality is suitable for irrigated rice, fish ponds, trees and crops.

The mainland is attached entirely to the entire Samar Island. Maravilla Island, San Juan Island and Bani Island are the three major islands of the municipality.

== Demographics ==
Population census of Lavezares
Year	Pop.	±% p.a.
1903	3,688	—
1918	5,953	+3.24%
1939	9,501	+2.25%
1948	18,508	+7.69%
1960	15,186	−1.63%
1970	16,336	+0.73%
1975	20,251	+4.40%
1980	20,007	−0.24%
1990	19,058	−0.48%
1995	20,492	+1.37%
2000	23,991	+3.44%
2007	26,131	+1.19%
2010	27,464	+1.83%
2015	28,770	+0.89%
2020	29,390	+0.45%
2024	29,801	+0.33%
Source: Philippine Statistics Authority

== Economy ==
Poverty incidence of Lavezares (%)

Source: Philippine Statistics Authority

== Government ==
The political body of Lavezares was established in 1875 under the Spanish colonial power wherein the local executive was alluded as Capitanes. From 1903 to 1935, the persons who assumed the position were called Presidentes, and from 1936 until present where they were referred to as Municipal Mayors.

Position	Name	Term of Office
Capitan (appointed)	Silvino Flores	1875-1877
Capitan (appointed)	Justiniano Morillo	1877-1879
Capitan (appointed)	Victorio Alvanes	1879-1881
Capitan (appointed)	Evaristo Martires	1881-1883
Capitan (appointed)	Angeles de Leon	1883-1886
Capitan (appointed)	Patricio Ebron	1886-1888
Capitan (appointed)	Feliciano Adriatico	1888-1892
Capitan (appointed)	Lucio Flores	1892-1894
Capitan (appointed)	Anastacio Adriatico	1894-1898
Capitan (appointed)	Cepriano de Leon	1898-1903
Presidente (appointed)	Lasaro Cuyco	1903-1908
Presidente (appointed)	Martin Custan	1908-1912
Presidente (elected)	Gregorio Adriatico	1912-1916
Presidente (elected)	Elias Bogtong	1916-1921
Presidente (elected)	Melecio Cuyuco	1921-1927
Presidente (elected)	Juan Ymata	1927-1931
Presidente (elected)	Eugenio Tingkingco	1931-1935
Municipal Mayor (elected)	Antonio Martires	1936-1938
Municipal Mayor (elected)	Pascualito Clutario	1938-1946
Municipal Mayor (elected)	Julio Turla	1946-1955
Municipal Mayor (elected)	Gabriel Querobines	1956-1959
Municipal Mayor (elected)	Basilio Chan	1960-1978
Municipal Mayor	Rodrigo Chan	1978-1979 (appointed); 1980-1986 (elected)
Municipal Mayor	Miguel Adriatico	1986-1987 (appointed)
Municipal Mayor (appointed)	Celedonio Saludaga, Jr	1987-1988
Municipal Mayor (elected)	Miguel Adriatico, Jr	1989-1991
Municipal Mayor (elected)	Quintin Saludaga, Jr	1992-2001
Municipal Mayor (elected)	Celedonio Saludaga, Jr	2001-2010

== Transportation ==
Access to Lavezares has two options: from Manila, a fourteen to fifteen hours of bus ride with Roll-on/roll-off vessels from Matnog, Sorsogon, to the port of Allen, Northern Samar, or taking a plane to Catarman and a jeepney ride to Lavezares both serving as the main transport facility towards this portion.

== Tourism ==
In this coastal province of Northern Samar, eco-tourism may just become an alternative income generator aside from coconuts and fishing.

True to mention are the white sand beaches abounding among its coastal and groups of island barangays that comprises the municipality though some parts have strong underwater current not suitable for a beach resort. Current white sand beach resorts are found at barangays Urdaneta and Barobaybay and waters between Bani Island and Barobaybay. The resorts offer huts along the beachfront and for overnight stays, tourist inns are available.

The coral reefs in Bancauan Island, Bani Island, Barangay Maravilla and Barangay San Juan are good for scuba diving.

The sunsets can be viewed at Lavezares Bay and Barangay Barobaybay, but Barangay Maravilla provides the most outstanding view because of the island's north to south orientation with just the vast sea on sight.

== Education ==
- Primary Schools - There are 26 barangay elementary school and one central school, Lavezares Central Elementary School.
- Secondary Schools - Basilio B. Chan Memorial Agricultural and Industrial School is the only public high school in the whole municipality, which is situated at Barangay Sabang-Tabok. It is the venue where the government can provide the youth of Lavezares the needed knowledge and skills that would prepare them not only for their college life but also to the challenges of real world. Nevertheless, there are 3 private schools offering secondary courses where 2 of which are operated by religious orders: The Holy Family Center of Studies at Caburihan and Barobaybay Academy Mission School at Barobaybay. Colegio de San Juan, where located at Libertad, offers secondary and tertiary education and serves as an alternative for those who cannot afford to study outside the municipality.
