= Bobon =

Municipality in Northern Samar, Philippines

- Municipality
- Municipality of Bobon
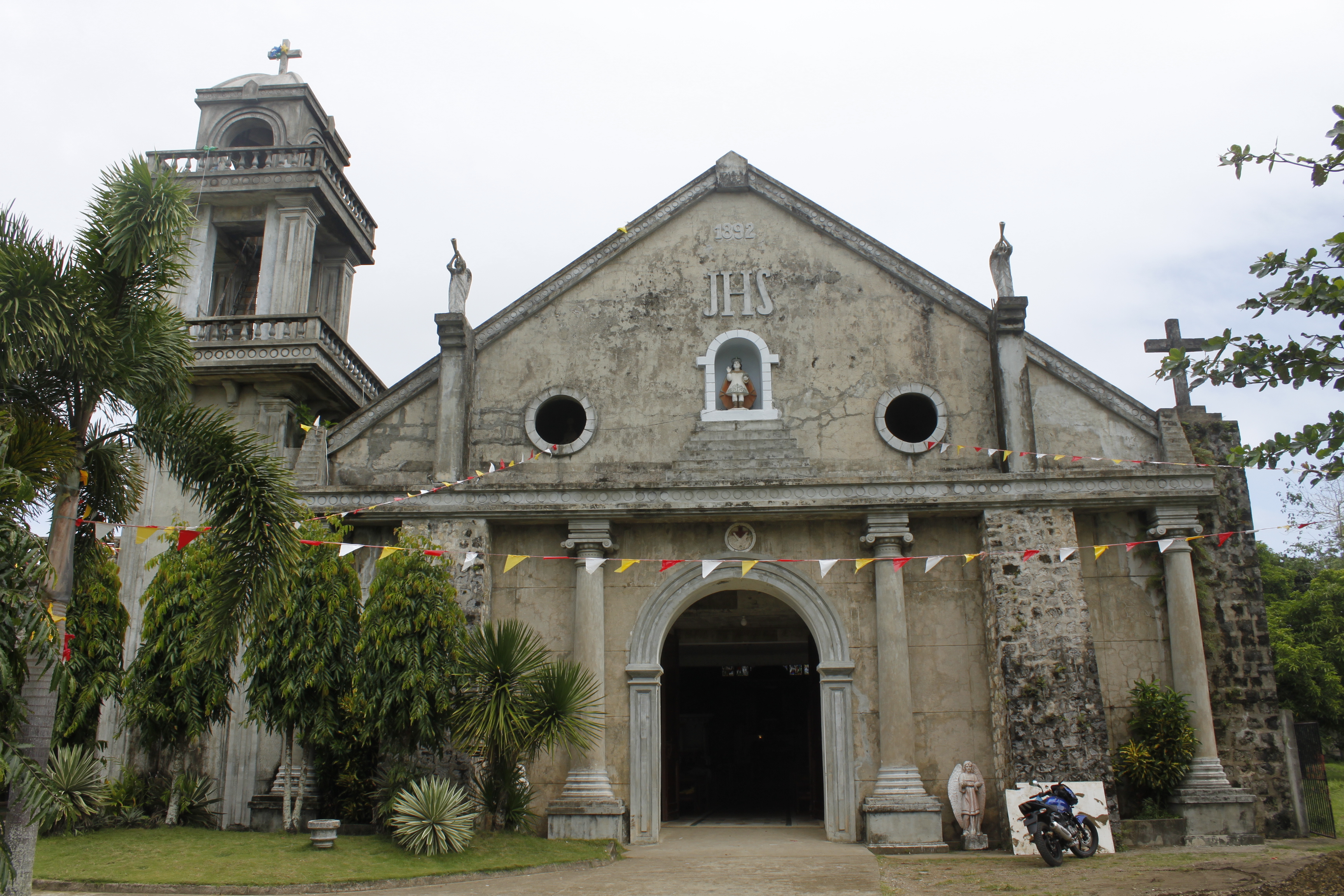
- Holy Name of Jesus Parish Church

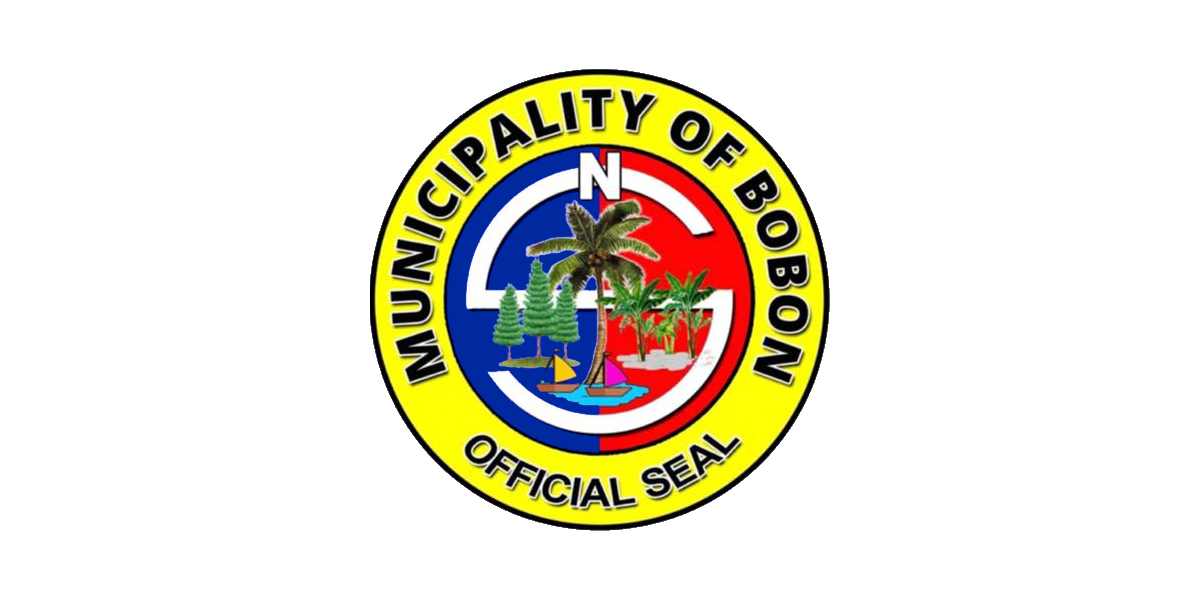
- Flag

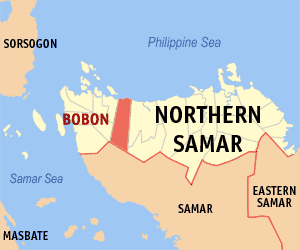
- Map of Northern Samar with Bobon highlighted
- Interactive map of Bobon
- Location within the Philippines
- Coordinates: 12°31′N 124°34′E
- Country: Philippines
- Region: Eastern Visayas
- Province: Northern Samar
- District: 1st district
- Barangays: 18 (see Barangays)

Government
  - Type: Sangguniang Bayan
  - Mayor: Reny “Bong” A. Cerenado
  - Vice Mayor: Ligaya Tagros-Uy
  - Representative: Paul R. Daza
  - Councilors: List: • Ma. Apra Gepollo; • Wilmar Tiberio; • Porfirio Gepollo, Sr.; • liway Jao; • Protacio Amaranto, Jr.; • Eric Lito G. Chan; • Pe Casinas; • Eduardo Ramos; • Hoseph B Calumpiano; DILG Masterlist of Officials
  - Electorate: 17,611 voters (2025)

Area
  - Total: 130.00 km^{2} (50.19 sq mi)
- Elevation: 10 m (33 ft)
- Highest elevation: 137 m (449 ft)
- Lowest elevation: 0 m (0 ft)

Population (2024)
  - Total: 27,266
  - Density: 209.74/km^{2} (543.22/sq mi)
  - Households: 5,884

Economy
  - Income class: 3rd municipal income class
  - Poverty incidence: 26.72% (2023)
  - Revenue: ₱ 179.4 million (2024)
  - Assets: ₱ 679.5 million (2024)
  - Expenditure: ₱ 137.4 million (2024)
  - Liabilities: ₱ 135.4 million (2024)

Service provider
  - Electricity: Northern Samar Electric Cooperative (NORSAMELCO)
- Time zone: UTC+8 (PST)
- ZIP code: 6401
- PSGC: 0804803000
- IDD : area code: +63 (0)55
- Native languages: Waray; Tagalog

Bobon, officially the Municipality of Bobon (Waray: Bungto san Bobon; Tagalog: Bayan ng Bobon), is a municipality in the province of Northern Samar, Philippines. According to the 2024 census, it has a population of 27,266 people.

== Etymology ==
The name of the municipality stems from two main local narratives centered around its unique geography and abundant freshwater:

- Bonbon meaning fine sand or coral, which reflects the town's low-lying coastal geography, where digging 2.5 meters (8 ft 2 in) deep revealed a thick layer of coral reef and white sand that naturally filters the ground into a potable water.
- Bobon, Bicolano word for "well," named by Bicolano fishermen and Spanish conquistadors who took refuge during a storm, discovered a massive natural well of fresh drinking water, and permanently settled around it.

== History ==
On July 25, 1949, barrios Aguadahan, Bag-ong Saban, Buenavista, Carangian, Giratag, Jamoog, Rosario, Salhag, and Tubigdanao were excised from Bobon to form the new independent municipality of San Jose, by virtue of Executive Order No. 248. Initially part of the undivided province of Samar, the municipality later became part of the new province of Northern Samar, following the 1965 Samar division plebiscite in November.

On June 21, 1969, several northern island barrios of Bobon were excised to form the independent municipality of Biri.

== Geography ==
The town borders with Catarman in the east, San Jose and Victoria in the west, Lope de Vega to the southeast, and Calbayog in Samar in the south.

=== Barangays ===
Bobon is politically subdivided into 18 barangays. Each barangay consists of puroks and some have sitios.

- Acerida
- Arellano
- Balat-balud
- Dancalan
- E. Duran (Himaraganan)
- Gen. Lucban (Poblacion)
- Jose Abad Santos
- Jose P. Laurel (Casulgan)
- Magsaysay (Doce)
- Calantiao (Pangobi-an)
- Quezon (Panicayan)
- Salvacion
- San Isidro
- San Juan (Poblacion)
- Santa Clara (Poblacion)
- Santander
- Somoroy
- Trojello

=== Climate ===
Climate data for Bobon, Northern Samar
Month	Jan	Feb	Mar	Apr	May	Jun	Jul	Aug	Sep	Oct	Nov	Dec	Year
Mean daily maximum °C (°F)	27 (81)	28 (82)	29 (84)	30 (86)	31 (88)	30 (86)	29 (84)	29 (84)	29 (84)	29 (84)	29 (84)	28 (82)	29 (84)
Mean daily minimum °C (°F)	22 (72)	22 (72)	22 (72)	22 (72)	24 (75)	24 (75)	24 (75)	24 (75)	24 (75)	24 (75)	23 (73)	23 (73)	23 (74)
Average precipitation mm (inches)	84 (3.3)	59 (2.3)	58 (2.3)	55 (2.2)	93 (3.7)	133 (5.2)	149 (5.9)	125 (4.9)	155 (6.1)	165 (6.5)	140 (5.5)	136 (5.4)	1,352 (53.3)
Average rainy days	18.1	13.6	15.8	16.1	21.7	25.5	26.6	25.1	24.8	25.8	22.7	20.1	255.9
Source: Meteoblue

== Demographics ==
Population census of Bobon
Year	Pop.	±% p.a.
1903	6,107	—
1918	9,145	+2.73%
1939	15,449	+2.53%
1948	24,287	+5.16%
1960	12,852	−5.16%
1970	10,143	−2.34%
1975	10,849	+1.36%
1980	12,702	+3.20%
1990	13,687	+0.75%
1995	15,800	+2.73%
2000	16,851	+1.39%
2007	19,765	+2.22%
2010	20,956	+2.15%
2015	23,668	+2.34%
2020	25,964	+1.97%
2024	27,266	+1.18%
Source: Philippine Statistics Authority

== Economy ==
Poverty incidence of Bobon (%)

Source: Philippine Statistics Authority

The annual regular revenue of Bobon for the fiscal year of 2016 was ₱71,646,727.00.

== Education ==
- Balat Balud Elementary School
- ETBMSF- Eladio T. Balite Memorial School of Fisheries
- CRAFTSMEN- Bobon School For Philippine Craftsmen
- PCU- Philippine Christian University (Asia College)
- BCES- Bobon Central Elementary School
- SES- Salvation Elementary School
- MES- Magsaysay Elementary School
- DES- Dancalan Elementary School
- AES- Acereda Elementary School
- JPLES- Jose P. Laurel Elementary School
- TES- Trujillo Elementary School
- Seno Memorial Institute (formerly Bobon Catholic Institute) – not in operation anymore as of 14 October 2008
- Quezon Elementary School
- Santander Elementary School
- E.duran Elementary School
- San Isidro Elementary School
- Somoroy Elementary School
- Calantiao Elementary School
- Arellano Elementary School
