= Rosario, Northern Samar =

Municipality in Northern Samar, Philippines

Rosario
- Municipality
- Municipality of Rosario
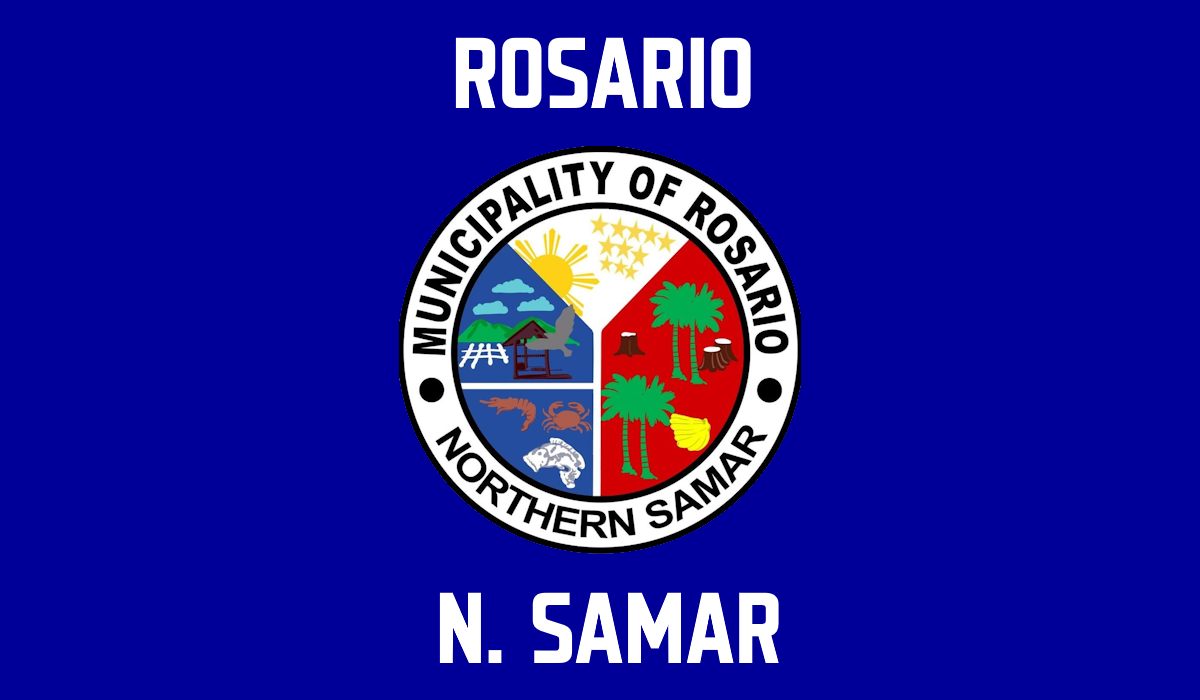
- Flag

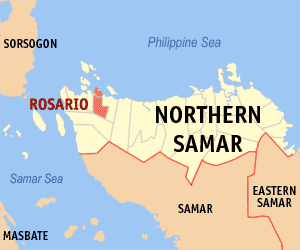
- Map of Northern Samar with Rosario highlighted
- Interactive map of Rosario
- Location within the Philippines
- Coordinates: 12°31′N 124°25′E
- Country: Philippines
- Region: Eastern Visayas
- Province: Northern Samar
- District: 1st district
- Founded: June 21, 1969
- Barangays: 11 (see Barangays)

Government
  - Type: Sangguniang Bayan
  - Mayor: David A. Bido
  - Vice Mayor: Vicente B. Arillo Jr.
  - Representative: Paul R. Daza
  - Councilors: List: • Glenn C. Alcera; • James Edward D. Ballicud; • Igmedio T. Alcera; • Francisco B. Pestaño; • Allan T. Turla; • Maximino T. Pederio; • Mariano A. Dino; • Ruben C. Pura; DILG Masterlist of Officials
  - Electorate: 9,361 voters (2025)

Area
  - Total: 31.60 km^{2} (12.20 sq mi)
- Elevation: 35 m (115 ft)
- Highest elevation: 271 m (889 ft)
- Lowest elevation: −2 m (−6.6 ft)

Population (2024 census)
  - Total: 11,726
  - Density: 371.1/km^{2} (961.1/sq mi)
  - Households: 2,438

Economy
  - Income class: 5th municipal income class
  - Poverty incidence: 26.49% (2023)
  - Revenue: ₱ 84.89 million (2024)
  - Assets: ₱ 234.3 million (2024)
  - Expenditure: ₱ 82.18 million (2024)
  - Liabilities: ₱ 14.95 million (2024)

Service provider
  - Electricity: Northern Samar Electric Cooperative (NORSAMELCO)
- Time zone: UTC+8 (PST)
- ZIP code: 6416
- PSGC: 0804816000
- IDD : area code: +63 (0)55
- Native languages: Waray; Tagalog

Rosario, officially the Municipality of Rosario (Waray: Bungto han Rosario; Tagalog: Bayan ng Rosario), is a 5th class municipality in the province of Northern Samar, Philippines. According to the 2024 census, it has a population of 11,726 people.

== History ==
On June 21, 1969, barrios Buenavista, Jamoog, Kagkawayan, Rosario, and Salhag were separated from San Jose to form the new independent municipality of Rosario, by virtue of Republic Act No. 5867. Barrio Rosario was designated as the municipal seat.

== Geography ==
Rosario is bordered to the west by Lavezares, to the east by San Jose, and Victoria to the south. Its coastal area is protected as part of the Biri Larosa Protected Landscape and Seascape.

=== Barangays ===
Rosario is politically subdivided into 11 barangays. Each barangay consists of puroks and some have sitios.

- Aguada
- Buenavista
- Jamoog
- Ligaya
- Poblacion (Estillero)
- Salhag
- San Lorenzo
- Bantolinao
- Commonwealth
- Guindaulan
- Kailingan

=== Climate ===
Climate data for Rosario, Northern Samar
Month	Jan	Feb	Mar	Apr	May	Jun	Jul	Aug	Sep	Oct	Nov	Dec	Year
Mean daily maximum °C (°F)	27 (81)	28 (82)	29 (84)	30 (86)	31 (88)	30 (86)	29 (84)	29 (84)	29 (84)	29 (84)	29 (84)	28 (82)	29 (84)
Mean daily minimum °C (°F)	22 (72)	22 (72)	22 (72)	22 (72)	24 (75)	24 (75)	24 (75)	24 (75)	24 (75)	24 (75)	23 (73)	23 (73)	23 (74)
Average precipitation mm (inches)	84 (3.3)	59 (2.3)	58 (2.3)	55 (2.2)	93 (3.7)	133 (5.2)	149 (5.9)	125 (4.9)	155 (6.1)	165 (6.5)	140 (5.5)	136 (5.4)	1,352 (53.3)
Average rainy days	18.1	13.6	15.8	16.1	21.7	25.5	26.6	25.1	24.8	25.8	22.7	20.1	255.9
Source: Meteoblue

== Demographics ==
Population census of Rosario
Year	Pop.	±% p.a.
1970	3,782	—
1975	5,176	+6.50%
1980	5,872	+2.55%
1990	6,699	+1.33%
1995	8,626	+4.85%
2000	8,647	+0.05%
2007	8,920	+0.43%
2010	10,214	+5.05%
2015	10,520	+0.56%
2020	10,949	+0.84%
2024	11,726	+1.66%
Source: Philippine Statistics Authority

== Economy ==
Poverty incidence of Rosario (%)

Source: Philippine Statistics Authority
