= Northern Samar =

Northern Samar Hilagang Samar (Filipino)
- Province
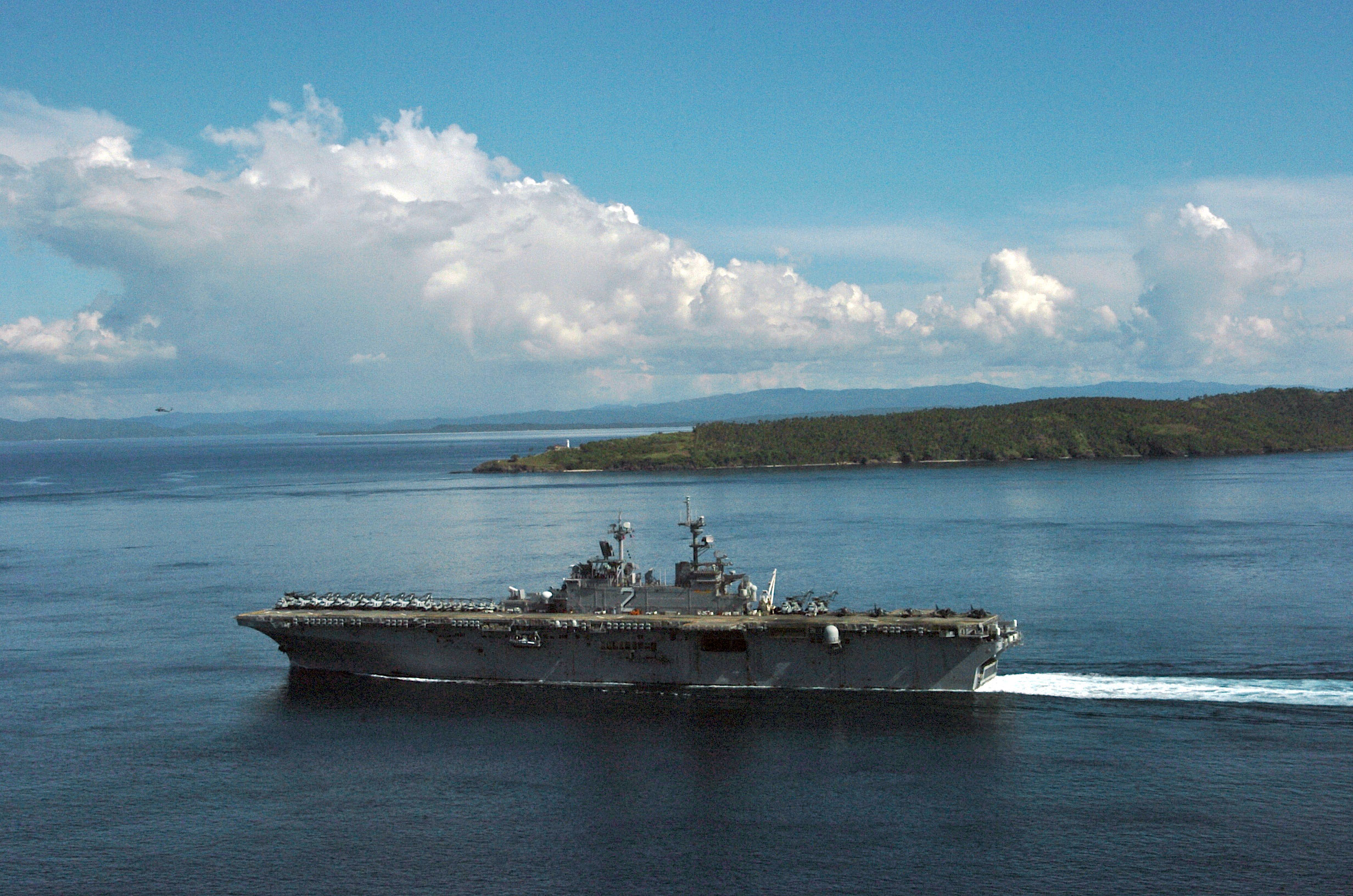
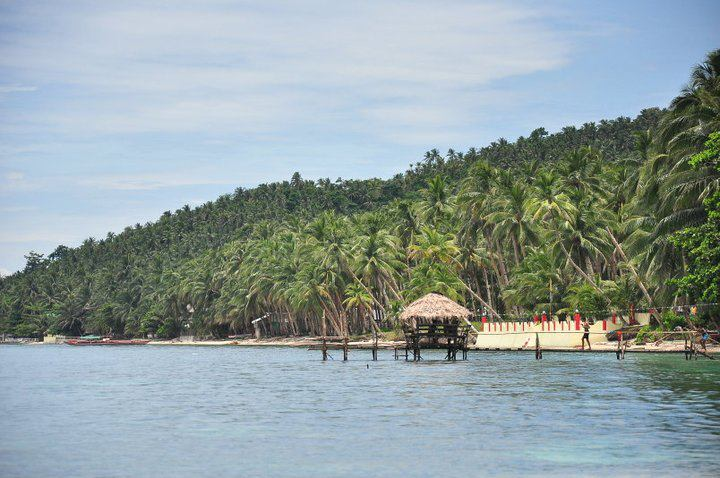
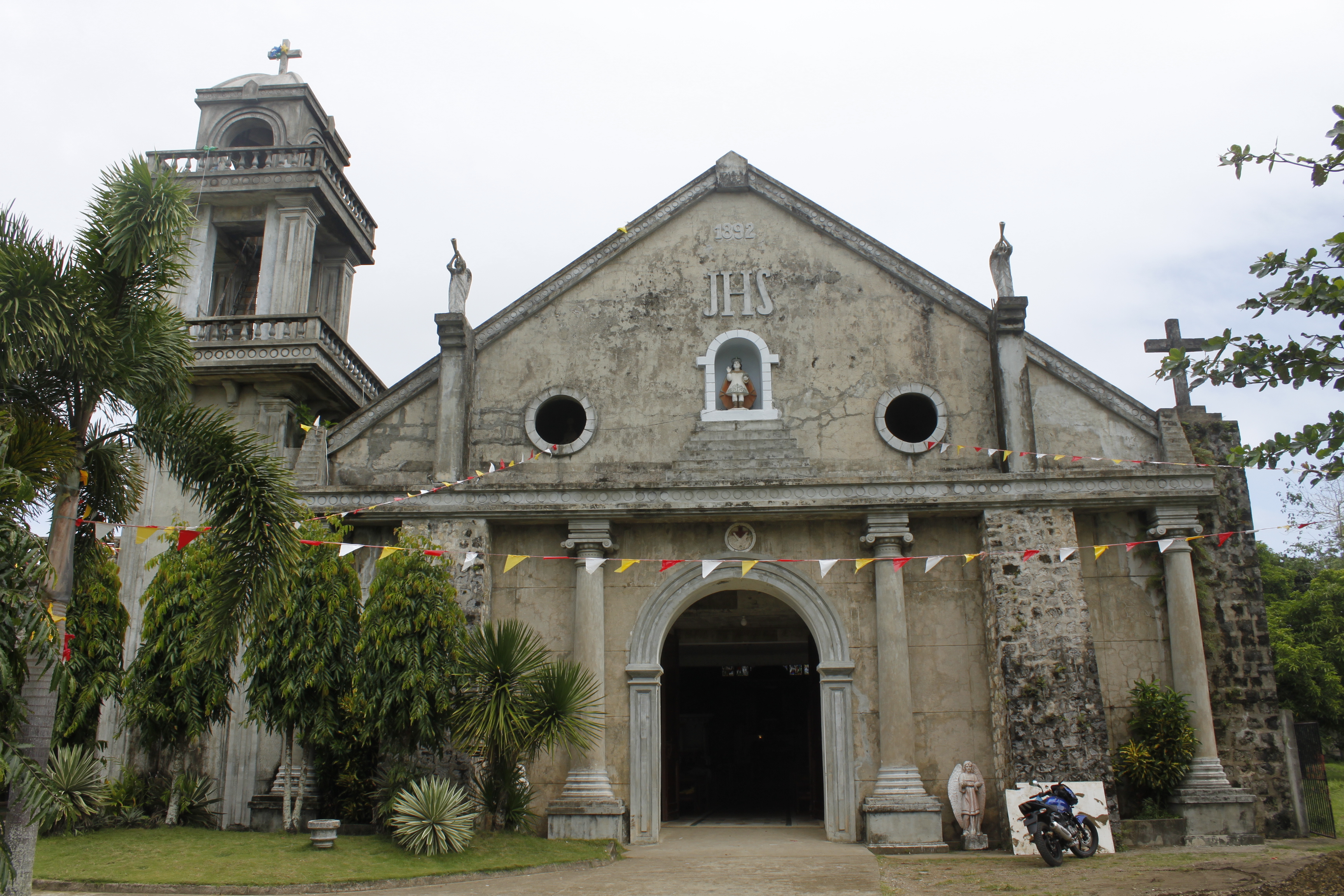
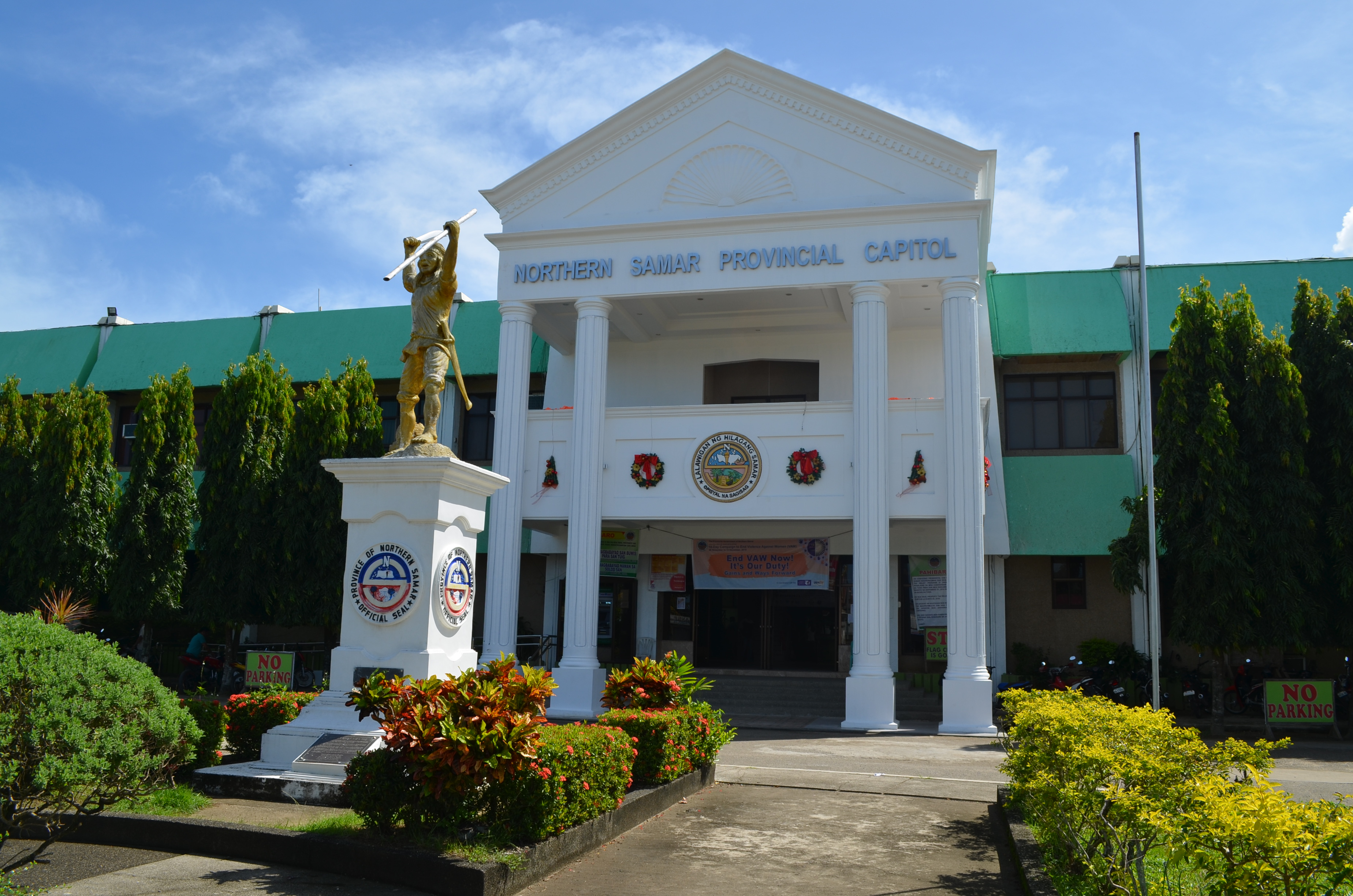
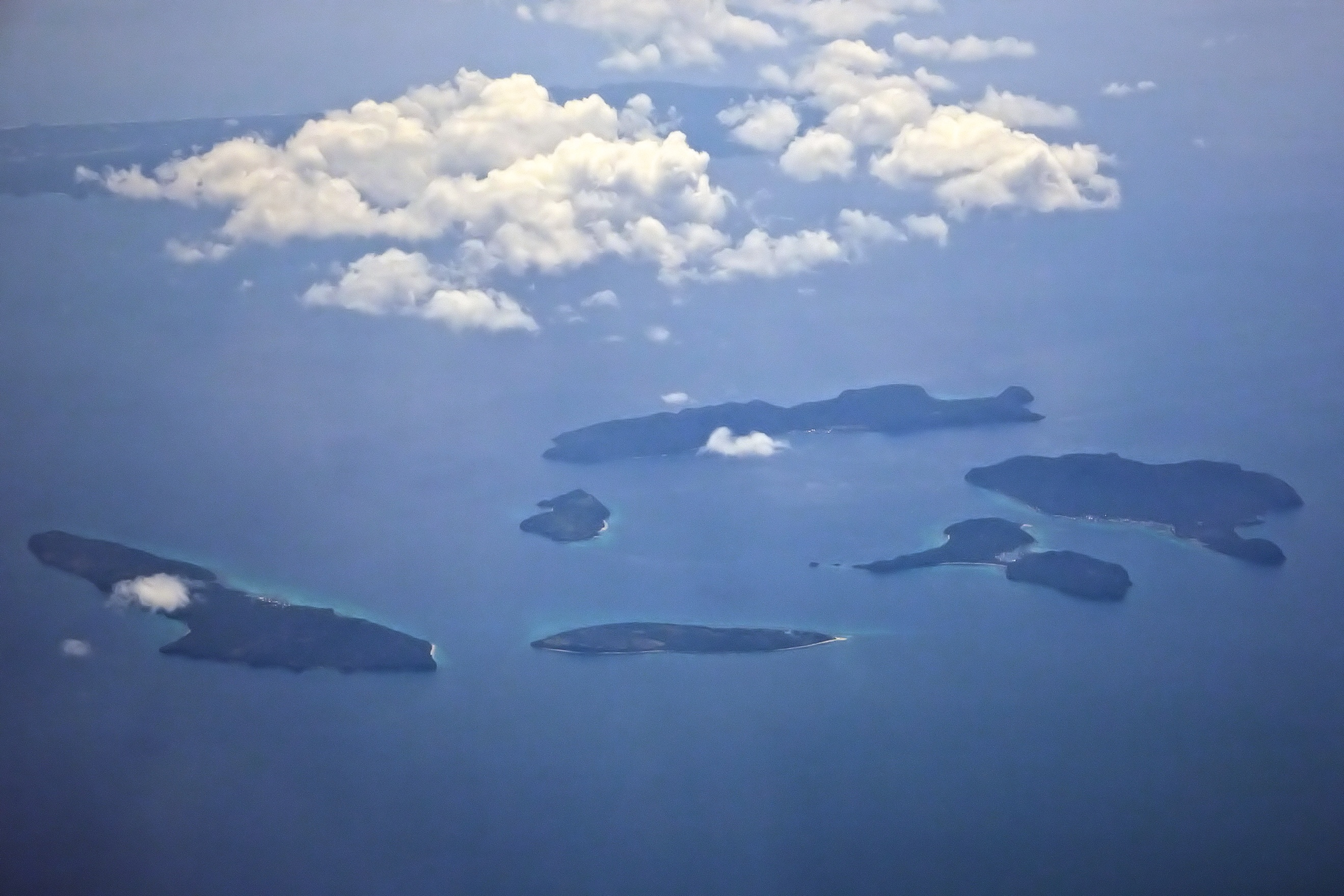
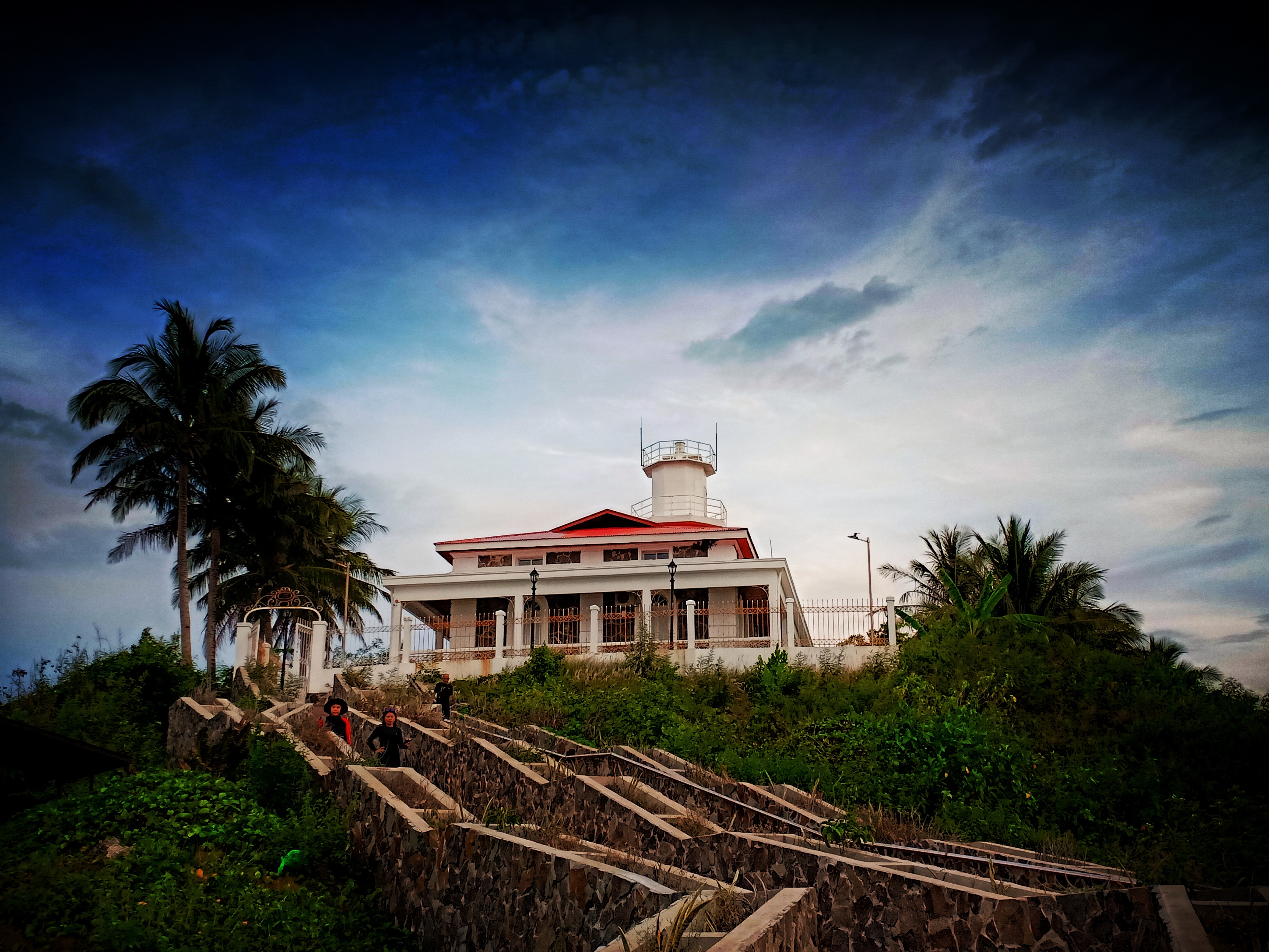
- (from top: left to right) San Bernardino Strait, Dalupiri Island, Church of Bobon, Provincial Capitol, San Vicente Islands, and Capul Lighthouse

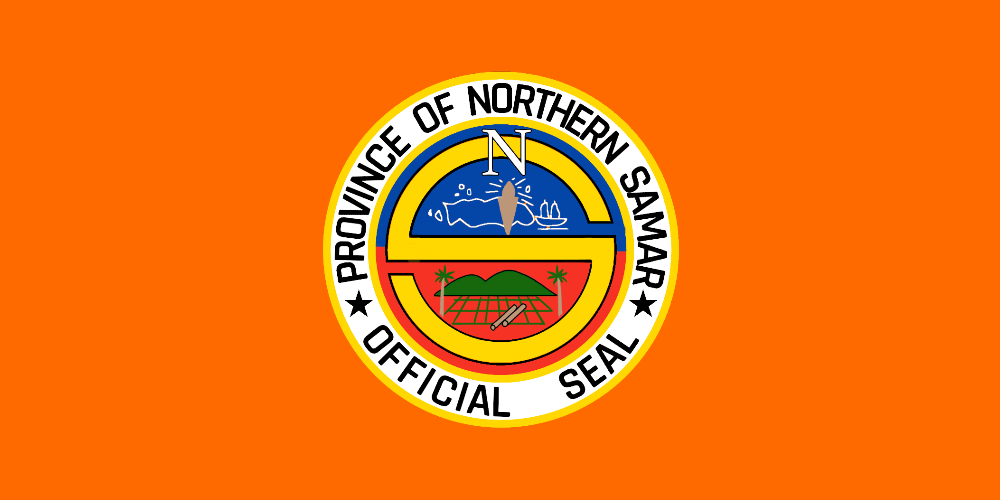
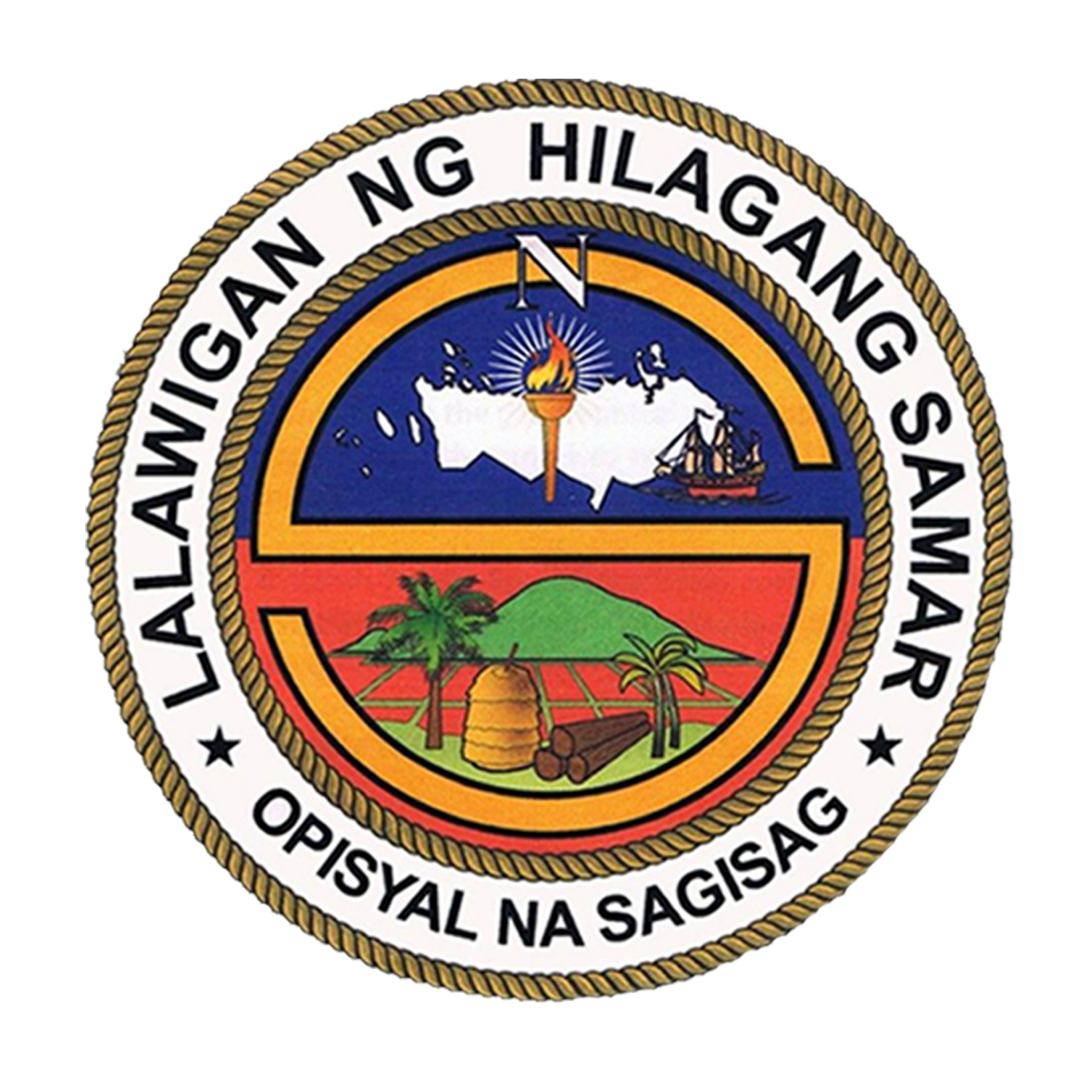
- Flag Seal

- Interactive map of Northern Samar
- Coordinates: 12°20′N 124°40′E
- Country: Philippines
- Region: Eastern Visayas
- Founded: June 19, 1965
- Ratified: November 14, 1967
- Capital and largest municipality: Catarman

Government
  - Type: Sangguniang Panlalawigan
  - Governor: Harris Christopher M. Ongchuan (NUP)
  - Vice Governor: Clarence E. Dato (PFP)
  - Legislature: Northern Samar Provincial Board
  - Electorate: 449,191 voters (2025)

Area
  - Total: 3,692.93 km^{2} (1,425.85 sq mi)
  - Rank: 34th out of 82
- Highest elevation (Mount Saamong): 514 m (1,686 ft)

Population (2024 census)
  - Total: 645,789
  - Rank: 48th out of 82
  - Density: 174.872/km^{2} (452.916/sq mi)
  - Rank: 51st out of 82
  - Households: 139,885

Divisions
  - Independent cities: 0
  - Component cities: 0
  - Municipalities: 24: Allen; Biri; Bobon; Capul; Catarman; Catubig; Gamay; Laoang; Lapinig; Las Navas; Lavezares; Lope de Vega; Mapanas; Mondragon; Palapag; Pambujan; Rosario; San Antonio; San Isidro; San Jose; San Roque; San Vicente; Silvino Lobos; Victoria
  - Barangays: 569
  - Districts: Legislative districts of Northern Samar

Economy
  - Income class: 1st provincial income class
  - Poverty incidence: 21.8% (2023)
  - Revenue: ₱ 2,362 million (2024)
  - Assets: ₱ 9,411 million (2024)
  - Expenditure: ₱ 2,079 million (2024)
  - Liabilities: ₱ 1,765 million (2024)
- Time zone: UTC+8 (PHT)
- PSGC: 084800000
- IDD : area code: +63 (0)55
- ISO 3166 code: PH-NSA
- Spoken languages: Waray; Inabaknon; Tagalog; English
- Website: northernsamar.gov.ph

Northern Samar (Waray: Amihanan Samar/Norte san Samar; Tagalog: Hilagang Samar), officially the Province of Northern Samar, is a province in the Philippines located in the Eastern Visayas region. Its capital is Catarman, the most populous town in the province and is located at the northern portion of the island of Samar. Bordering the province to the south are the provinces of Samar and Eastern Samar. To the northwest, across the San Bernardino Strait is Sorsogon; to the east is the Philippine Sea of the Pacific Ocean and to the west is Samar Sea.

== History ==
=== Spanish colonial era ===
Historian William Henry Scott wrote that a "Samar datu by the name of Iberein was rowed out to a Spanish vessel anchored in his harbor in 1543 by oarsmen collared in gold; while wearing on his own person earrings and chains." In the local epic called siday entitled Bingi of Lawan as written in the article of Scott, Lawan is a prosperous settlement in Samar.

In 1596, many names, such as Samal, Ibabao, and Tandaya, were given to Samar Island prior to the coming of the Spaniards in 1596. During the early days of Spanish occupation, Samar was under the jurisdiction of Cebu.

In 1614, the Jesuits established a mission residence in Palapag among the Ibabao populace. These missionaries stayed until the late 17th century when they were expelled from the Philippines in 1768 and were replaced by the Franciscans.

As the San Bernardino Strait was along the route of the Spanish galleons plying between Manila and Acapulco, Mexico, a royal port was established in Palapag where the richly laden Manila Galleons were protected from unfavorable winds and troubled seas.

In the early years of the 16th century, shipbuilders were drafted from Palapag to the Cavite shipyards for the construction of galleons and vessels for the conservation of defense of the island. It was also at this time that these recruits ignited the Sumoroy insurrection, which signaled a general uprising against Spain in the Visayas and Mindanao. The insurrection simultaneously flared northward to Albay and southward to the northern coasts of Mindanao and then Cebu. It took over a year before the Spaniards were able to subdue the rebellion.

Samar and Leyte were separated from Cebu in 1735. They were split in 1747 but was reversed in 1762 with the approval of the King of Spain, following complaints from the Jesuits. The province of Samar was later established as a distinct province in 1768 after it got separated from the province of Leyte. In 1777, Samar and Leyte split for the last time when it was approved in Madrid in 1786 and had been effective in 1799.

=== American colonial era ===
Later in 1898, when the Americans landed on the beach of Catarman, they organized a revolutionary army led by General Vicente Lukban who fought the invaders armed with cannons and rifles with only bolos and paltiks. Although defeated, they, however, continued to harass the Americans through guerrilla warfare.

=== Japanese occupation ===
During World War II, the people of Northern Samar organized a platoon of volunteers supported by voluntary contributions. The contingent became a part of the Philippine National Guard in Manila. The province also helped the government by purchasing a considerable amount of bonds floated to finance the National Commission for Independence, then organized by Manuel L. Quezon after a coalition of the Nacionalista and Democrata parties were formed.

=== Postwar era ===
Samar Congressmen Eladio T. Balite (1st district), Fernando R. Veloso (2nd district), and Felipe J. Abrigo (3rd district), authored Republic Act No. 4221 which was approved by Congress in 1963. The law, ratified in a plebiscite on June 19, 1965, divided Samar into three: Northern Samar, Eastern Samar and (Western) Samar. The first provincial officials of Northern Samar, aside from the lone district congressman, were elected on November 14, 1967, and on January 1, 1968, they officially assumed office.

=== Martial law era ===
The beginning months of the 1970s had marked a period of turmoil and change in the Philippines, as well as in Northern Samar. During his bid to be the first Philippine president to be re-elected for a second term, Ferdinand Marcos launched an unprecedented number of foreign debt-funded public works projects. This caused the Philippine economy to take a sudden downwards turn known as the 1969 Philippine balance of payments crisis, which led to a period of economic difficulty and a significant rise of social unrest. With only a year left in his last constitutionally allowed term as president, Ferdinand Marcos placed the Philippines under Martial Law in September 1972 and thus retained the position for fourteen more years. This period in Philippine history is remembered for the Marcos administration's record of human rights abuses, particularly targeting political opponents, student activists, journalists, religious workers, farmers, and others who fought against the Marcos dictatorship.

One of the infamous incidents of the Marcos dictatorship era was the September 15, 1981 Sag-od massacre in Las Navas, Northern Samar. Eighteen security personnel of Juan Ponce Enrile's San Jose Timber Corporation - who were also members of the Special Forces of the Civilian Home Defense Force (CHDF) allied with a paramilitary group called "the Lost Command" - ordered residents of Barrio Sag-od out of their homes and then opened fire on them. 45 men, women and children were killed, leaving only 13 inhabitants of Barrio Sag-od alive. It was also noted that a majority of the children in the Sag-od massacre died with their mothers while many others were reportedly killed due to their being unable to "stifle their cries of fear and terror" when Special Forces-ICHDF personnel were "marching them off for massacre".

The Marcos era was a time of significant deforestation in Northern Samar and throughout the Philippines, with the forest cover of the Philippines shrinking until only 8% remained. In Northern Samar, one of the major companies given Timber License Agreements (TLAs) to cut down trees during Martial Law was San Jose Timber, which was owned by Juan Ponce Enrile. Enrile was the government official Ferdinand Marcos put in place to approve Timber License Agreements during Martial Law.

== Geography ==
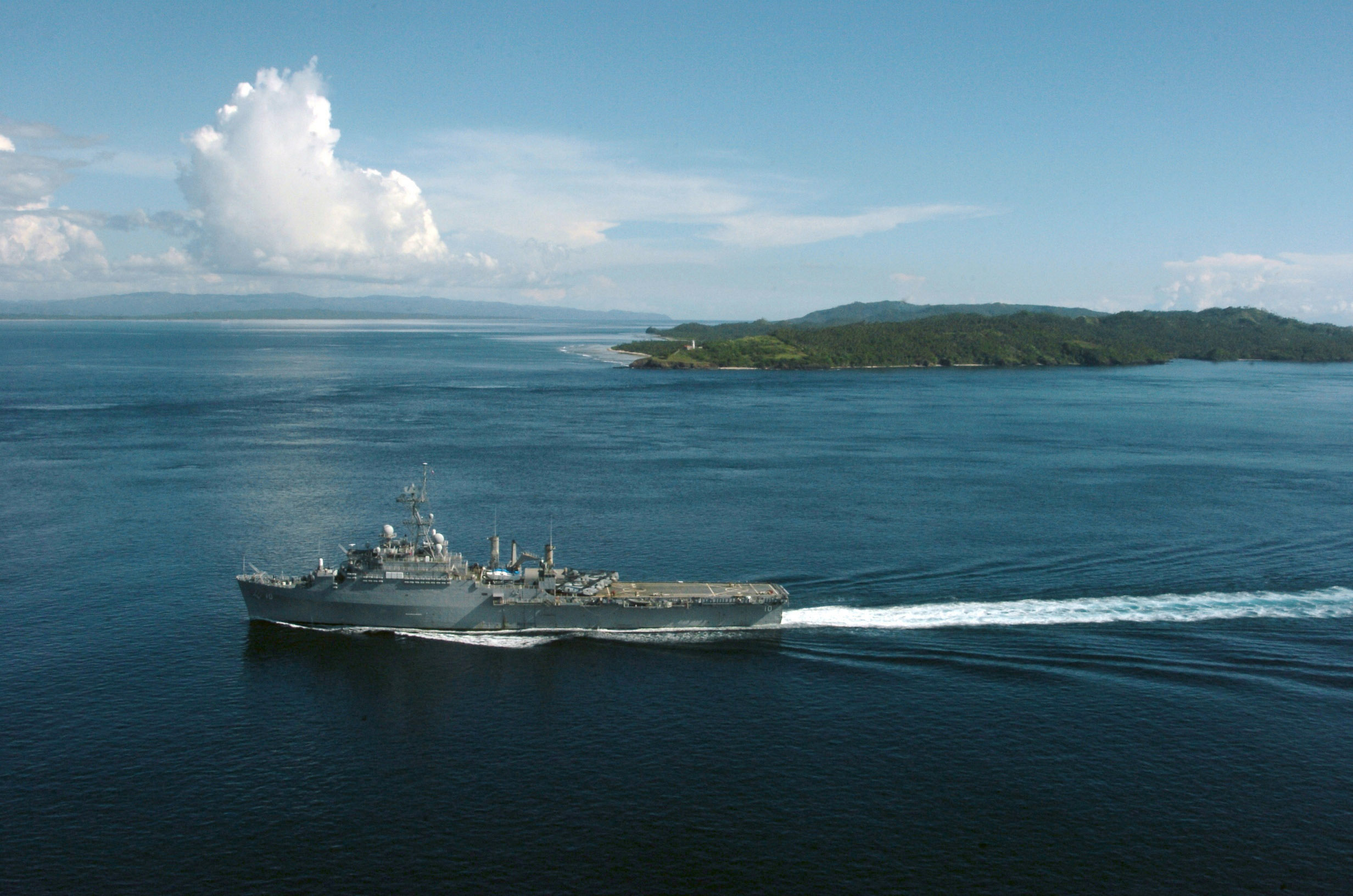
Capul Island

Northern Samar covers a total area of 3,692.93 square kilometers (1,425.85 sq mi) occupying the northern section of Samar Island in the Eastern Visayas region. The province is bounded by north by the San Bernardino Strait, on the east by the Pacific Ocean, on the west by the Samar Sea, on the southwest by Samar and on the southeast by Eastern Samar. It ranks 37th in size among the 80 provinces of the Philippines and accounts for practically 1.2 percent of the total land area of the country. About 52 percent of the total land area is covered by forest, while 42 percent is classified as alienable and disposable.

The province is composed largely of low and extremely rugged hills and small lowland areas. It also has small and discontinuous areas along the coasts and its rivers are usually accompanied by alluvial plains and valleys. The province is endowed with relatively rich and fertile soil that most crops can grow on it.

=== Topography ===
Northern Samar has a very rugged terrain with restricted pocket plains and valleys. River valleys are low-lying and are often interrupted by hills, while the remaining portion is rolling, hilly, and mountainous. The interior of the mainland consists of highly dissected hills and mountain peaks. Low-lying hills are found between the coastal plains of Palapag, the river valley of Gamay, and Catubig Valley. There are lagoons and lakes (Cinco Forest), and the Pinipisilan falls near Catubig.

=== Climate ===
Northern Samar falls under the intermediate type climate, which has no distinct dry and wet seasons. The rainiest months are October to January, while the driest is the month of May.

=== Administrative divisions ===
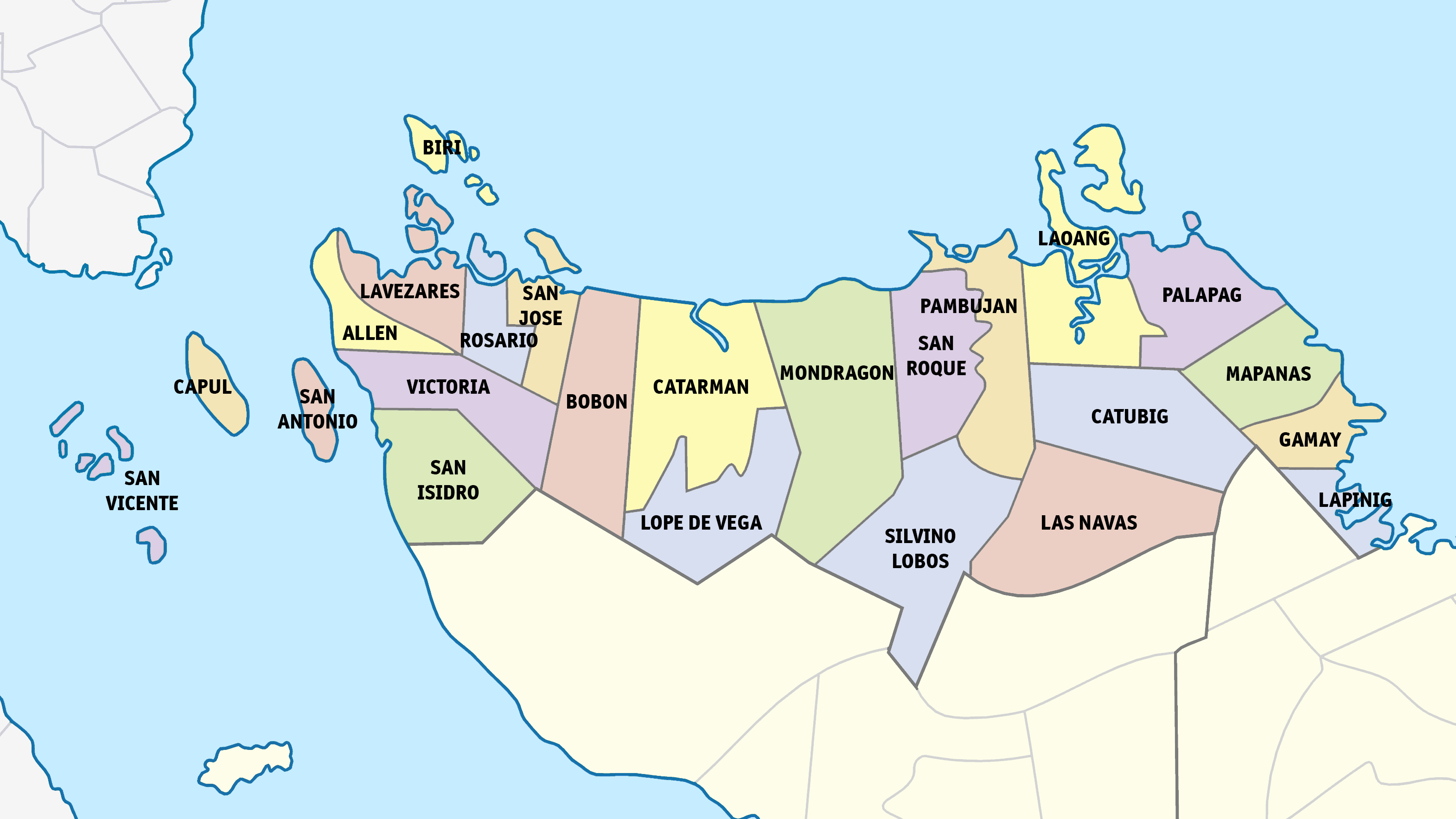
Political divisions

Northern Samar comprises 24 municipalities with 569 registered barangays. The province is divided into two legislative districts. The first district covers all municipalities located west of Mondragon (including Mondragon itself), with the rest comprising the second district.

† Provincial capital

Municipality		District	Population			±% p.a.	Area		Density		Barangay	Coordinates^{[A]}
			(2020)		(2015)		km^{2}	sq mi	/km^{2}	/sq mi		
Allen		1st	3.9%	25,228	25,469	−0.18%	47.60	18.38	530	1,400	20	12°30′04″N 124°16′58″E
Biri		1st	1.8%	11,274	11,767	−0.81%	24.62	9.51	460	1,200	8	12°40′54″N 124°21′43″E
Bobon		1st	4.1%	25,964	23,668	+1.78%	130.00	50.19	200	520	18	12°31′33″N 124°33′51″E
Capul		1st	1.9%	12,323	12,679	−0.54%	35.56	13.73	350	910	12	12°25′23″N 124°10′56″E
Catarman	†	1st	15.3%	97,879	94,037	+0.77%	464.43	179.32	210	540	55	12°29′59″N 124°38′11″E
Catubig		2nd	5.0%	32,174	33,025	−0.50%	214.99	83.01	150	390	47	12°24′35″N 125°03′11″E
Gamay		2nd	3.7%	23,367	23,511	−0.12%	115.10	44.44	200	520	26	12°23′12″N 125°18′05″E
Laoang		2nd	9.5%	60,607	61,359	−0.23%	246.94	95.34	250	650	56	12°34′07″N 125°00′55″E
Lapinig		2nd	1.9%	11,844	13,020	−1.79%	57.30	22.12	210	540	15	12°19′00″N 125°18′08″E
Las Navas		2nd	5.7%	36,621	37,947	−0.67%	282.61	109.12	130	340	53	12°20′21″N 125°01′52″E
Lavezares		1st	4.6%	29,390	28,770	+0.41%	119.50	46.14	250	650	26	12°32′06″N 124°19′49″E
Lope de Vega		1st	2.3%	14,690	14,687	0.00%	280.00	108.11	52	130	22	12°18′00″N 124°37′30″E
Mapanas		2nd	2.2%	14,234	14,025	+0.28%	117.85	45.50	120	310	13	12°28′31″N 125°15′19″E
Mondragon		1st	6.5%	41,415	38,726	+1.29%	288.90	111.54	140	360	24	12°30′58″N 124°45′09″E
Palapag		2nd	5.3%	34,034	34,286	−0.14%	179.60	69.34	190	490	32	12°32′46″N 125°06′44″E
Pambujan		2nd	5.6%	35,532	33,062	+1.38%	163.90	63.28	220	570	26	12°33′54″N 124°55′42″E
Rosario		1st	1.7%	10,949	10,520	+0.76%	31.60	12.20	350	910	11	12°31′19″N 124°25′30″E
San Antonio		1st	1.4%	8,882	9,058	−0.37%	27.00	10.42	330	850	10	12°24′47″N 124°16′42″E
San Isidro		1st	4.4%	27,867	26,650	+0.85%	255.90	98.80	110	280	14	12°23′09″N 124°19′46″E
San Jose		1st	2.8%	17,641	17,561	+0.09%	29.85	11.53	590	1,500	16	12°31′48″N 124°29′16″E
San Roque		2nd	4.7%	29,882	30,580	−0.44%	152.98	59.07	200	520	16	12°32′14″N 124°52′26″E
San Vicente		1st	1.1%	6,928	7,856	−2.37%	15.80	6.10	440	1,100	7	12°16′17″N 124°05′57″E
Silvino Lobos		2nd	2.4%	15,100	15,299	−0.25%	224.20	86.56	67	170	26	12°19′31″N 124°50′45″E
Victoria		1st	2.4%	15,361	14,817	+0.69%	186.70	72.09	82	210	16	12°26′50″N 124°18′53″E
Total				639,186	632,379	+0.20%	3,692.93	1,425.85	170	440	569	(see GeoGroup box)
1. Coordinates mark the town center, and are sortable by latitude.

== Demographics ==
Population census of Northern Samar
Year	Pop.	±% p.a.
1903	67,680	—
1918	93,559	+2.18%
1939	155,050	+2.43%
1948	227,957	+4.38%
1960	261,424	+1.15%
1970	306,114	+1.59%
1975	354,665	+3.00%
1980	378,516	+1.31%
1990	383,654	+0.13%
1995	454,195	+3.21%
2000	500,639	+2.11%
2007	549,759	+1.30%
2010	589,013	+2.54%
2015	632,379	+1.36%
2020	639,186	+0.23%
2024	645,789	+0.25%
Source: Philippine Statistics Authority

The population of Northern Samar in the 2024 census was 645,789 people, with a density of 170 inhabitants per square kilometer or 440 inhabitants per square mile.

According to the 2020 ethnic census by the Philippine Statistics Authority, the majority of Northern Samar's reported population consists of the Waray people, who remain the overwhelmingly dominant ethnic group in the province. The next largest groups are the Bisaya and Cebuano. Other ethnic minorities recorded in the province include Tagalog, Bicol, Ilonggo, Ilocano, and Boholano, alongside a small number of other ethnicities and unreported individuals.

Population by ethnicity (2020)
Ethnicity	Population
Waray	604,372 (94.88%)
Bisaya	20,969 (3.29%)
Cebuano	3,653 (0.57%)
Tagalog	2,265 (0.36%)
Bicol	1,677 (0.26%)
Ilonggo	713 (0.11%)
Ilocano	530 (0.08%)
Boholano	491 (0.08%)
Others	2,321 (0.36%)
Not Reported	4 (0%)

The people of Northern Samar were previously called Ibabaonon. They are predominantly Waray-Waray or Waray, the people of Eastern Visayas or Samar-Leyte region. To distinguish themselves from the Westehanon (people from Samar) and Estehanon (from Eastern Samar) when Samar Island was split into three provinces in 1965, and the Leyteños (the people from the Leyte Island), they now call themselves as Ninorte Samarenyo or Nortehanon. They are primarily speaking in Waray-Waray which is the main lingua franca of the province.

Bicolano and Masbateño inhabitants coming from respective neighboring provinces of Sorsogon and Masbate are also common at Northern Samar.

=== Languages ===
Languages Spoken (2000)
Language	Speakers
Waray	632,379
Cebuano	14,436
Abaknon	10,668
Binisaya	8,885
Tagalog	746
Others	3,306
Not Reported	1,571

The majority of the people in the province speak the Ninorte Samarnon variation of Waray-Waray. About 4.5 percent of the population, especially in the island towns, speak Cebuano, particularly in the island town of San Antonio. Inabaknon, a unique language said to be one of the most preserved languages to date, is the native tongue of the populace in the island town of Capul.

Ninorte Samarnon usually is further subclassified into Balicuatro, Central and Pacific speakers.

Tagalog and English are also widely used and understood in Northern Samar.

=== Religion ===
==== Catholicism ====
The communities of this province are predominantly Catholic (80%).

==== Others ====
Other religious groups are Members Church of God International (MCGI), Iglesia ni Cristo, Philippine Independent Church (Iglesia Filipina Independiente), Seventh-day Adventists, Jehovah's Witnesses, The Church of Jesus Christ of Latter-day Saints and other Christian sects. A small number of population are Muslim.

=== Socio-demographic situation ===
Northern Samar is classified as a second class province, according to the Philippine Statistics Authority, the data gathered from the Department of Finance Department Order No.23-08 (Effective July 29, 2008).

Catarman is the capital town of the province where most political and economic activities take place. It is the seat of administration and the center of trade and commerce as well as industry.

The province is considered a very rural area with 65% of its people residing in the countryside.

== Economy ==
Poverty incidence of Northern Samar (%)

Source: Philippine Statistics Authority

== Tourism ==
Northern Samar has several tourism potentials that remain undiscovered by tourists. Some of these include old churches, waterfalls, rivers, caves, virgin forests, and beaches.

Among the last frontiers in the country, its rugged coastline of limestone cliffs along the Pacific Ocean is a historical landmark. During the Spanish colonial era, Samar island was the first Philippine landfall seen by the Manila galleons as they approached the end of their long voyage from Acapulco.

Entering the waters of the Philippine archipelago, the galleons called at the fortified island of Capul off Samar, offered thanks for a safe crossing at the Jesuit church, and then negotiated the rough waters of the narrow San Bernardino Strait toward Manila, their final destination.

Capul also became the last stop on Philippine soil of the departing galleons before the long, often treacherous trans-Pacific voyage to Acapulco in Mexico.

== Government ==
Northern Samar Provincial Capitol

=== Governor ===
- Harris M. Ongchuan (NUP)

=== Vice Governor ===
- Clarence E. Dato (NUP)

=== Congressional districts ===
- 1st district: Niko Raul Daza (NUP)
- 2nd district: Edwin C. Ongchuan (NUP)

=== List of former governors ===
- Irene Balite (1967–1971)
- Edilberto A. del Valle (1971–1980)
- Reynaldo A. del Valle (1980–1986)
- Justiniano M. Singzon (1986–1988)
- Harlin Abayon (1988–1998)
- Madeleine M. Ong (1998–2001)
- Raul A. Daza (2001–2010)
- Paul R. Daza (2010–2013)
- Jose L. Ong, Jr. (2013–2019)
- Edwin C. Ongchuan (2019–2025)

=== Official provincial seal ===
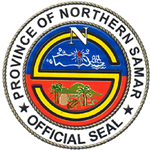

The Coat of Arms of Samar represents the political, geographical description, historical, economic, and social representation and allegorical ideas of the province. The letters N and S represent Northern Samar. The map of Northern Samar represents the geography and 24 municipalities of the province, including the five island towns. The galleon represents the Spanish conquistadors that reached the land of the Ibabao to preach the gospel of Christianity, spread the Creed of Roman Catholicism and introduce civil governance thru the Royal Port of Palapag in 1640. Mount Bubuya (Palapag Mesa) represents the highest mountain range in Palapag, where Agustin Sumuroy and his men retreated to and encamped after killing Fr. Miguel Balberan, thus starting the Sumuroy Rebellion. The rice field, abaca, timber, and coconut are all economic representations.

The following are the allegorical ideas of the province: Blue, the color is symbolic of vast marine and aquatic resources, a source of livelihood for the fisher folks of the coastal towns. Tangerine represents the cheerfulness, high spirits, and optimism of the people of the province. Yellow represents golden harvest, and abundance of resources. White symbolizes transparency in governance. The torch is meant to illuminate the province and set it afire with quality education, a primary thrust of the provincial government. Rope ties the emblems together in a circular shape, it represents equality in rights and justice, and unity for peace and development.

== Notable people ==
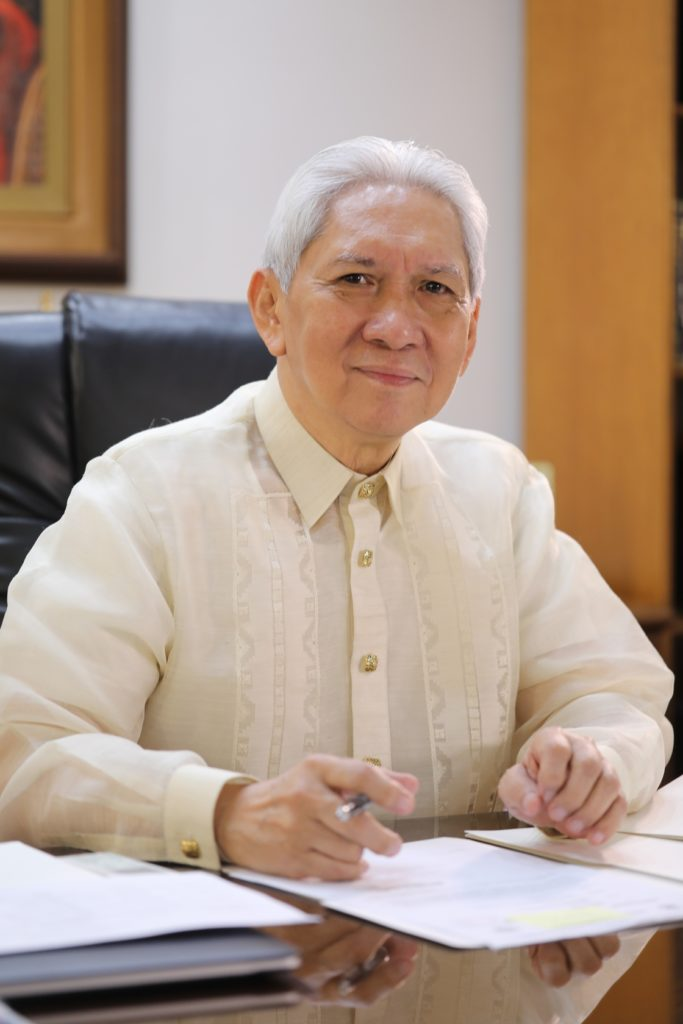
Supreme Court Associate Justice Samuel Martires

- Agustin Sumuroy (better known as Juan Sumuroy), a Filipino hero from Palapag, Northern Samar and Waray leader of the Sumuroy Rebellion, a rebellion of native Filipinos against colonial Spanish forces that occurred in the eastern Visayas in 1649–1650.
- Samuel Martires, a Filipino lawyer, Associate Justice of Sandiganbayan from 2005 to 2017, Associate Justice of the Supreme Court of the Philippines and incumbent Ombudsman of the Philippines, is from Palapag, Northern Samar.
- Ricky Lo, Entertainment Editor and Columnist (Funfare, The Philippine Star), TV Host (The Buzz, Star Talk) is from Las Navas, Northern Samar.
- Angel Aquino, Filipino fashion model, TV host, and FAMAS and Gawad Urian Award-nominated film and TV actress
- Errol "Budoy" Marabiles, Filipino reggae musician, songwriter and TV host; vocalist of the reggae band Junior Kilat
- Pooh, Filipino actor, comedian, impersonator, singer, and TV host.
- Aloy Adlawan, multi-awarded Filipino filmmaker, writer, producer, director, and composer
