= Biri, Northern Samar =

Municipality in Northern Samar, Philippines

Biri
- Municipality
- Municipality of Biri
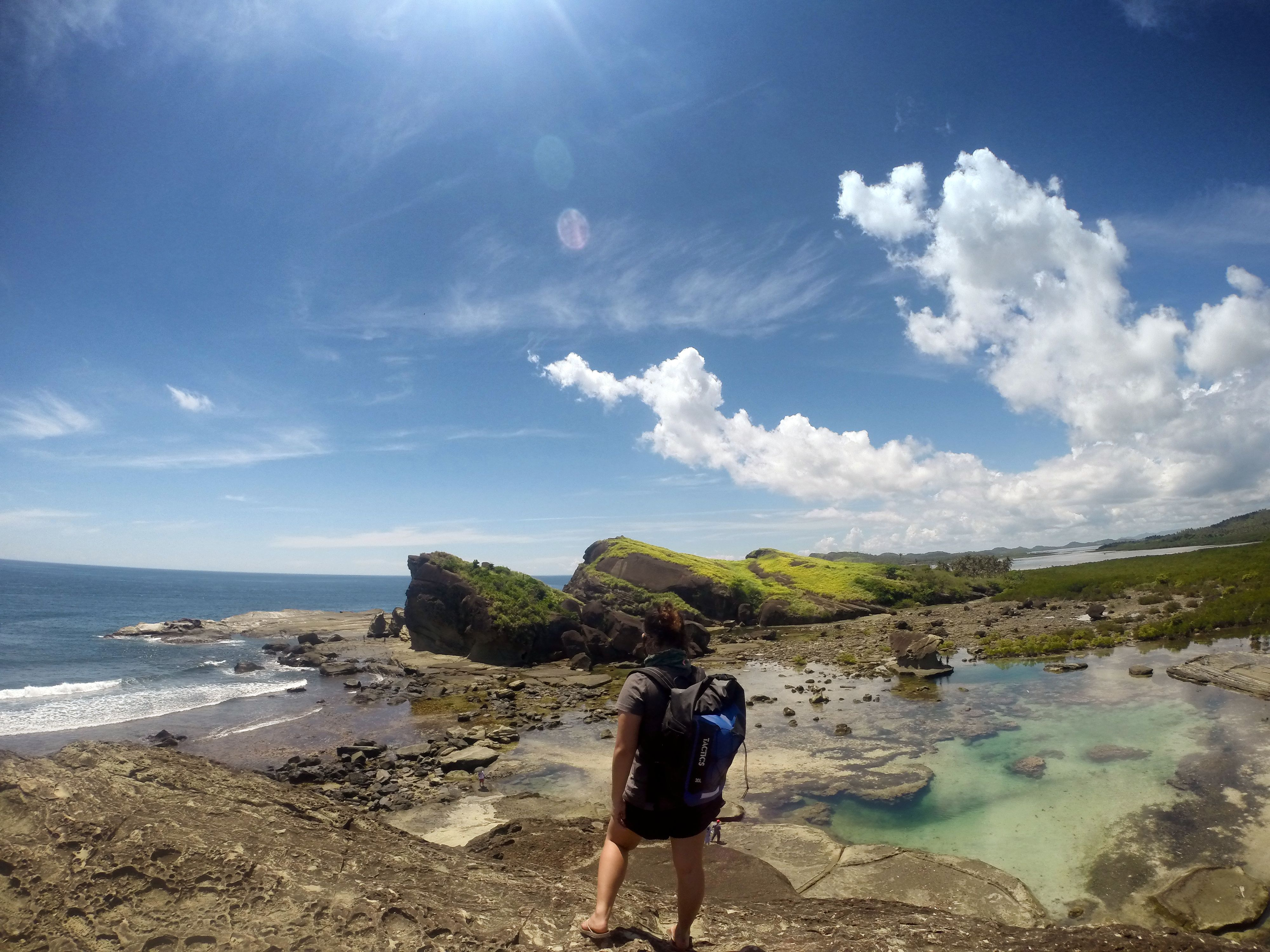
- Bel-at and Tidal pool part of Biri Rock Formation

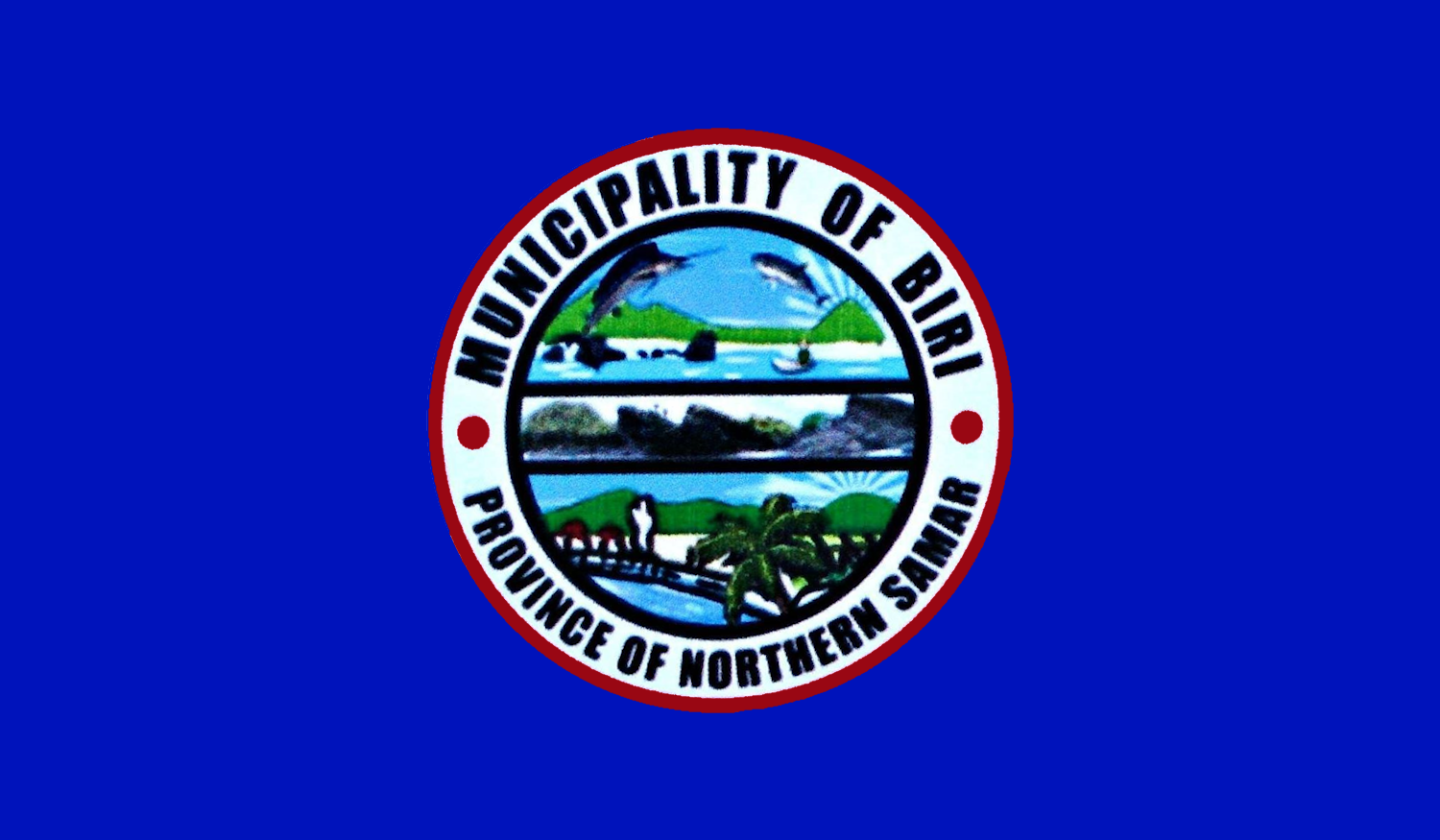
- Flag

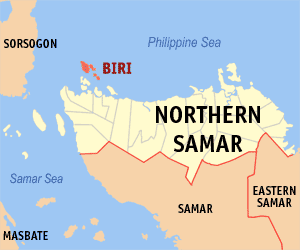
- Map of Northern Samar with Biri highlighted
- Interactive map of Biri
- Location within the Philippines
- Coordinates: 12°40′N 124°23′E
- Country: Philippines
- Region: Eastern Visayas
- Province: Northern Samar
- District: 1st district
- Founded: June 21, 1969
- Barangays: 8 (see Barangays)

Government
  - Type: Sangguniang Bayan
  - Mayor: Antonio B. Delos Reyes, Jr.
  - Vice Mayor: Ana B. Araojo
  - Representative: Paul R. Daza
  - Councilors: List: • Jade P. Magallanes; • Derwin T. Quiling; • Bernarda A. Bernaldez; • Edgardo T. Siabal; • Roger D. Loreto; • Felipe E. Sabangan; • Rhudor R. Paredes; • Manuel B. Bernaldez; DILG Masterlist of Officials
  - Electorate: 9,562 voters (2025)

Area
  - Total: 24.62 km^{2} (9.51 sq mi)
- Elevation: 1.0 m (3.3 ft)
- Highest elevation: 189 m (620 ft)
- Lowest elevation: −1 m (−3.3 ft)

Population (2024 census)
  - Total: 11,005
  - Density: 447.0/km^{2} (1,158/sq mi)
  - Households: 2,485

Economy
  - Income class: 5th municipal income class
  - Poverty incidence: 23.61% (2023)
  - Revenue: ₱ 84.71 million (2024)
  - Assets: ₱ 201.7 million (2024)
  - Expenditure: ₱ 101.2 million (2024)
  - Liabilities: ₱ 25.36 million (2024)

Service provider
  - Electricity: Northern Samar Electric Cooperative (NORSAMELCO)
- Time zone: UTC+8 (PST)
- ZIP code: 6410
- PSGC: 0804802000
- IDD : area code: +63 (0)55
- Native languages: Waray; Tagalog

Biri, officially the Municipality of Biri (Waray: Bungto han Biri; Tagalog: Bayan ng Biri), is a municipality in the province of Northern Samar, Philippines. According to the 2024 census, it has a population of 11,005 people.

The archipelagic town is also known for its inakob, a traditional Waray dish made by first cooking grated root crops (gabi) with coconut milk, condensed milk, eggs, brown sugar, and an herb called anuv. Once cooked, the grated gabi is put inside gabi shells which have been peeled. The dish is then boiled with coconut milk. The dish is traditionally eaten hot by the people of Biri during the rainy months.

== History ==
Biri originated as a barrio in 1649, previously under the jurisdiction of Bobon. On June 21, 1969, the barrios of Biri, Kauswagan, MacArthur, Pio del Pilar, Progress, San Antonio, San Pedro, and Santo Niño were excised from Bobon to form the new independent municipality of Biri, by virtue of Republic Act No. 5500. The municipality's first officials were elected in November 1969.

== Geography ==
The municipality is facing the Pacific Ocean to the east and the San Bernardino Strait to the west. It consists of several islands off the northern coast of Samar Island, the largest of which is Biri Island. Other larger islands are Talisay, Magasang, Macarite, and Cagnipa. Biri Island is notable for a large number of unusual rock formations along the northern shore, facing the Philippine Sea. It is included in the marine protected area known as Biri Larosa Protected Landscape and Seascape.

=== Barangays ===
Biri is politically subdivided into 8 barangays. Each barangay consists of puroks and some have sitios.

- Poblacion (Biri)
- Kauswagan (Basud)
- MacArthur
- Pio Del Pilar
- Progress or Talisay
- San Antonio
- San Pedro
- Santo Niño (Palhugan)

=== Climate ===
Climate data for Biri, Northern Samar
Month	Jan	Feb	Mar	Apr	May	Jun	Jul	Aug	Sep	Oct	Nov	Dec	Year
Mean daily maximum °C (°F)	27 (81)	28 (82)	29 (84)	30 (86)	31 (88)	30 (86)	29 (84)	29 (84)	29 (84)	29 (84)	29 (84)	28 (82)	29 (84)
Mean daily minimum °C (°F)	22 (72)	22 (72)	22 (72)	22 (72)	24 (75)	24 (75)	24 (75)	24 (75)	24 (75)	24 (75)	23 (73)	23 (73)	23 (74)
Average precipitation mm (inches)	84 (3.3)	59 (2.3)	58 (2.3)	55 (2.2)	93 (3.7)	133 (5.2)	149 (5.9)	125 (4.9)	155 (6.1)	165 (6.5)	140 (5.5)	136 (5.4)	1,352 (53.3)
Average rainy days	18.1	13.6	15.8	16.1	21.7	25.5	26.6	25.1	24.8	25.8	22.7	20.1	255.9
Source: Meteoblue

== Demographics ==
Population census of Biri
Year	Pop.	±% p.a.
1970	5,577	—
1975	6,517	+3.17%
1980	7,437	+2.68%
1990	7,467	+0.04%
1995	8,866	+3.27%
2000	8,700	−0.40%
2007	10,649	+2.83%
2010	10,987	+1.14%
2015	11,767	+1.31%
2020	11,274	−0.90%
2024	11,005	−0.58%
Source: Philippine Statistics Authority

== Economy ==
Poverty incidence of Biri (%)

Source: Philippine Statistics Authority

== Mangrove reforestation ==
In 2007, the Community-Based Mangrove Protection and Management project was implemented in Biri, funded by the Philippine Tropical Forest Conservation Foundation (PTFCF). The project aimed to contribute to the regeneration of the mangrove ecosystem by establishing a community-based mangrove management system. The project covered protection of 546 hectares and enhancement planting in 39 hectares. As of 2013, it has been expanded to all eight barangays in Biri.

== Biri Initiative Org. ==
In 2012, a non-profit organization, Biri Initiative Org., was registered with the Securities and Exchange Commission. Its main objectives are to restore areas of coral reef damaged by illegal fishing methods, promote sustainable and environment-friendly methods of fishing, and encourage opportunities for alternative livelihoods, particularly for women.
