= Human mail =

Transport of a person through the postal system

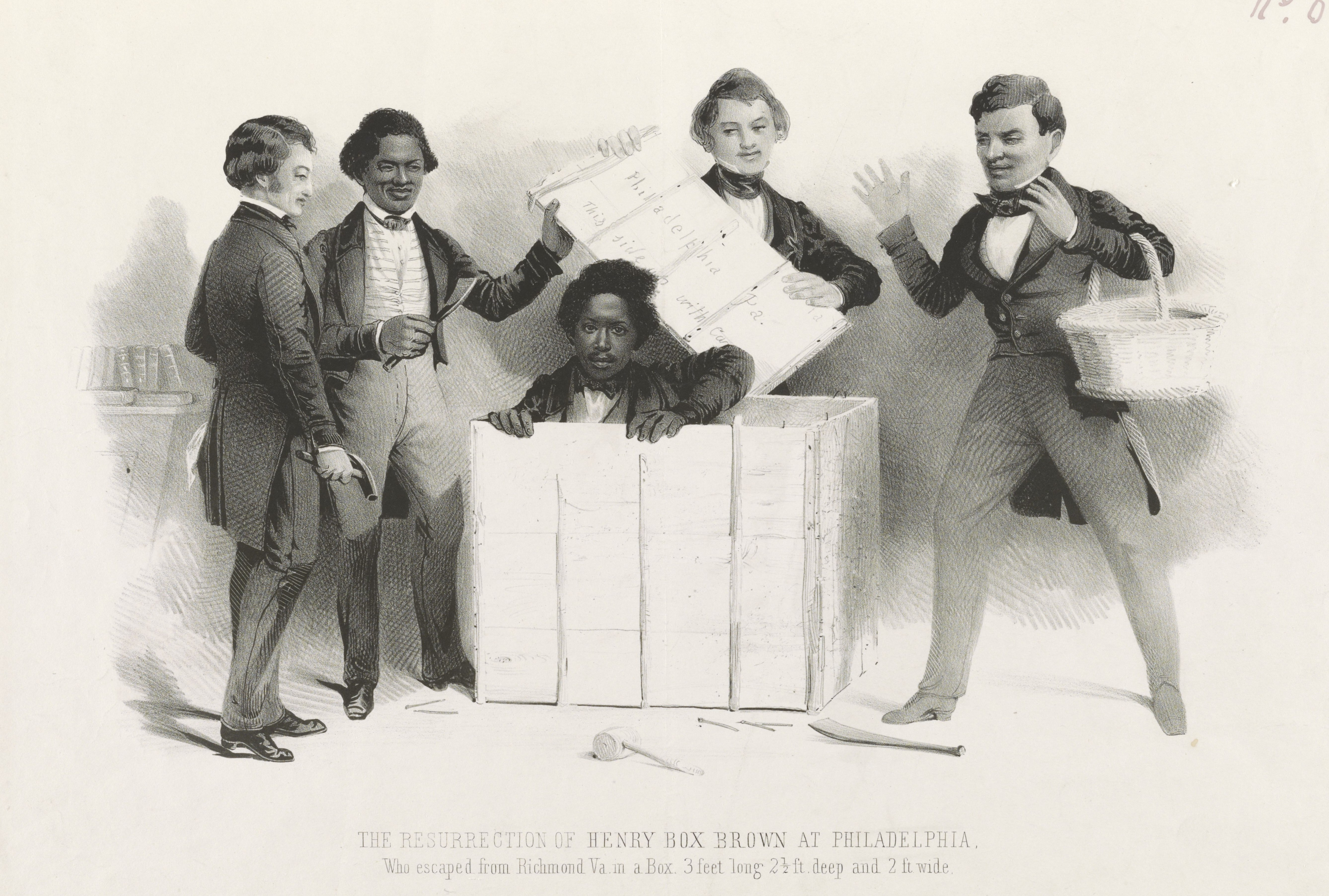
The Resurrection of Henry Box Brown at Philadelphia – a lithograph by Samuel Rowse showing the emergence of Henry Box Brown from a packing crate.

Human mail is the transportation of a person through the postal system, usually as a stowaway. While rare, there have been some reported cases of people attempting to travel through the mail.

== Real occurrences ==
- Henry Brown (age 42), an African-American slave from Virginia, successfully escaped in a shipping box sent north to the free state of Pennsylvania in 1849. He was known thereafter as Henry "Box" Brown.
- Among his many human-mail stunts in the 1890s, Austrian tailor Herman Zeitung mailed himself in a box from New York to the World's Columbian Exposition in Chicago, arriving on July 28, 1893. Four days earlier, another Austrian, Ignatz Lefkovitz, did the same.
- W. Reginald Bray mailed himself within England by ordinary mail in 1900 and then by registered mail in 1903.
- Suffragettes Elspeth Douglas McClelland and Daisy Solomon mailed themselves successfully to the then Prime Minister of the United Kingdom, H. H. Asquith at 10 Downing Street on 23 February 1909, but his office refused to accept the parcels.
- Reg Spiers mailed himself from Heathrow Airport, London, to Perth Airport, Western Australia, in 1964. His 63-hour journey was spent in a box made by fellow British javelin thrower John McSorley. Spiers spent some time outside his container in the cargo hold of the plane, and suffered from dehydration when he was offloaded onto the tarmac of Bombay Airport. He arrived in Perth undetected and returned home to Adelaide.
- In 1965, Brian Robson posted himself from Australia to the United Kingdom; he was discovered in the United States in transit and sent back to London. The journey took four days, with the box repeatedly being stored upside down. Two men, Paul and John, assisted him in the trip by nailing the box shut.
- Charles McKinley (age 25) shipped himself from New York City to Dallas, Texas in a box in 2003. He was attempting to visit his parents and wanted to save on the air fare by charging the shipping fees to his former employer. However, he was discovered during the final leg of his journey, having successfully travelled by plane.
- An inmate (age 42) serving a seven-year drug conviction sentence in Germany escaped from a prison in 2008 by climbing into a box in the mail room, which was picked up by a courier. Felon was recaptured.
- In August 2012, Hu Seng of Chongqing, a city in southern China, shipped himself to his girlfriend as a prank. He nearly died when the courier took three hours to deliver the package. Seng had minimal air in the box which was too thick to puncture breathing holes. When Seng arrived at his girlfriend's address, she found him unconscious and he had to be revived by paramedics.

== Mailing children ==
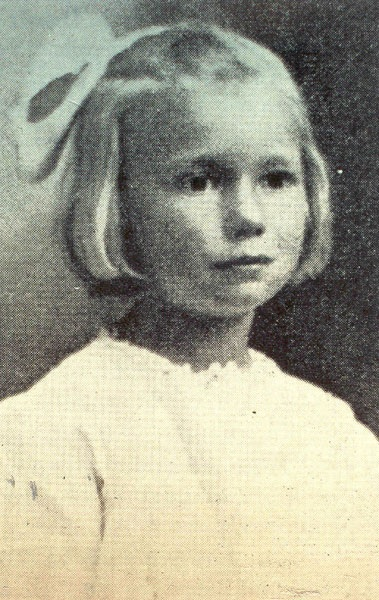
Charlotte May Pierstorff was mailed from Grangeville to Lewiston, Idaho on February 19, 1914, since her weight of 48 1/2 lb (22.0 kg) was within the legal 50 pound limit at the time.

The mailing of people weighing less than 50 pounds (23 kg), i.e., children, was occasionally practiced due to a legal ambiguity when the United States first introduced domestic parcel post in 1913, but was restricted by 1914. The children were carried along by mail carriers, but were not put in boxes.

== See also ==
- Freighthopping
- Diplomatic bag
