= B/B Florentino Das =

Motorized balangay

History

Philippines
- Name: B/B Florentino Das
- Launched: May 24, 2024
- Maiden voyage: May 27, 2024

General characteristics
- Type: Balangay
- Length: 24 m (79 ft)
- Beam: 5 m (16 ft)

The B/B Florentino Das is a motorized balangay built in 2024.

== History ==
=== Construction ===
The B/B Florentino Das was built at Butuan, Agusan del Norte, the same site where three traditional balangay were unearthed in 1976. Construction of the newer balangay, the Florentino Das began in the first quarter of 2024 and took 100 days. Six master builders led by Ibrahim Abdulla of Sibutu built the boat.

=== 2024 expedition ===
The B/B Florentino Das had a noted expedition upon its completion form May to June 2024. The ship was named after Filipino explorer Florentino Das. The journey was dubbed as The Balangay Expedition to West Philippine Sea with its crew led by Art Valdez.

The Florentino Das was officially launched on May 24, 2024. It was laid to water using a backhoe and other machinery in the absence of a slipway.

The large boat sailed from Butuan on May 27, made a short stop in Dumaguete, before stopping at San Vicente, Palawan to resupply. After an overnight stay, they sailed off to Thitu Island in the Spratly Islands of the South China Sea. The crew conducted a tree-planting activity and a medical mission for residents of the Philippines-administered island as part of their efforts to assert their country's sovereignty claims related to the South China Sea dispute.

After the expedition, Florentino Das sailed towards Manila Bay to dock the waters adjacent to the CCP Complex along Roxas Boulevard.

=== Post-2024 activities ===
In 2026, the Florentino Das reportedly is berthed at the Pasig River Esplanade.

== Specifications ==
The B/B Florentino Das is described as a "replica" of a balangay a type of Filipino traditional sail boat. It was built using traditional methods and was made using Philippine ironwood sourced from Siargao Island. It measures 24 by 5 meters (79 ft × 16 ft).

It is motorized, powered by an engine. Its other modern amenities include a wi-fi spot and air-conditioning in its cabin.
