= Stowaway =

Sneaking onto a vehicle

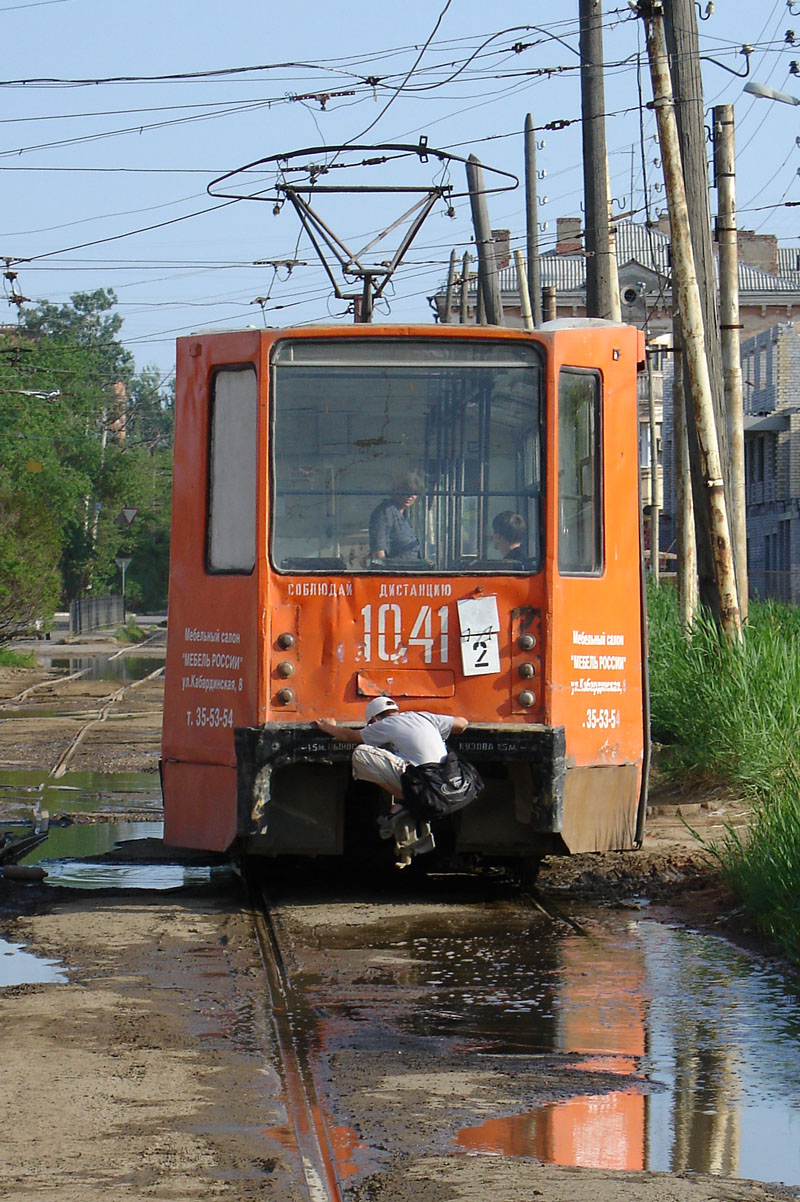
A stowaway on a tram in Astrakhan, Russia

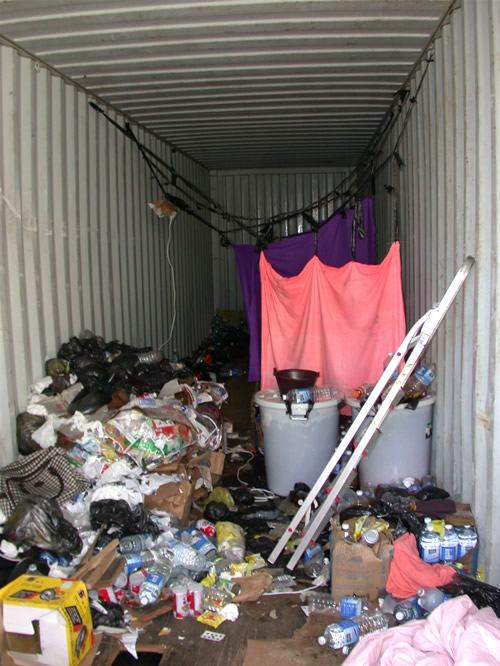
A shipping container in which 22 stowaways were discovered at the Port of Seattle

A stowaway or clandestine traveller is a person who secretly boards a vehicle, such as a ship, an aircraft, a train, cargo truck or bus.

Sometimes, the purpose is to get from one place to another without paying for transportation. In other cases, the goal is to enter another country without first obtaining a travel visa or other permission. Stowaways differ from people smuggling in that the stowaway needs to avoid detection by the truck driver, ship crew, and others responsible for the safe and secure operation of the transportation service.

Thousands of stowaways have travelled by sea or land over the last several centuries. A much smaller number of people have attempted to stow away on aircraft. Many stowaways have died during the attempt, especially in cases of train surfing and wheel-well stowaway flights.

== Origin ==
The word takes its origin with the expression stow away. This stow away expression is old and was used for things (such as food), such usage is seen for instance in the 1689 book A New Voyage Round the World, Volume 1 or 1637 Journals of the House of Lords, Volume 11.

The word was also used (later) for people. This gave names such as stow-aways, when the correct current name in modern English language is stowaway. Depending on the circumstances, people were stowed away in order to hide themselves, or to be transported as slaves. The concept of people hiding is not so recent; it was yet forbidden (and so known) in 1748 by king of Spain, under the polizón denomination.

=== From 1843 ===
The Convention on Facilitation of International Maritime Traffic, 1965, as amended, (The FAL Convention), define stowaway as

"A person who is secreted on a ship, or in cargo which is subsequently loaded on the ship, without the consent of the shipowner or the master or any other responsible person and who is detected on board the ship after it has departed from a port, or in the cargo while unloading it in the port of arrival, and is reported as a stowaway by the master to the appropriate authorities".

Unnoticed by the captain, crew, port officials and customs authorities, stowaways may gain access to a ship with or without the assistance of port personnel. Once on board the ship, stowaways hide in empty containers, cargo holds, tanks, tunnels, behind false panels, stores, accommodation areas, engine rooms, void spaces, cranes and chain lockers.

The presence of stowaways on board ships may bring serious consequences for ships and, by extension, to the shipping industry as a whole; the ship could be delayed in port; the repatriation of stowaways can be a very complex and costly procedure involving masters, shipowners, port authorities and agents, and the life of stowaways could be endangered as they may spend several days hidden, with the risk of suffocation and without any food or water.

== By transport mode ==
=== Rail transportation ===
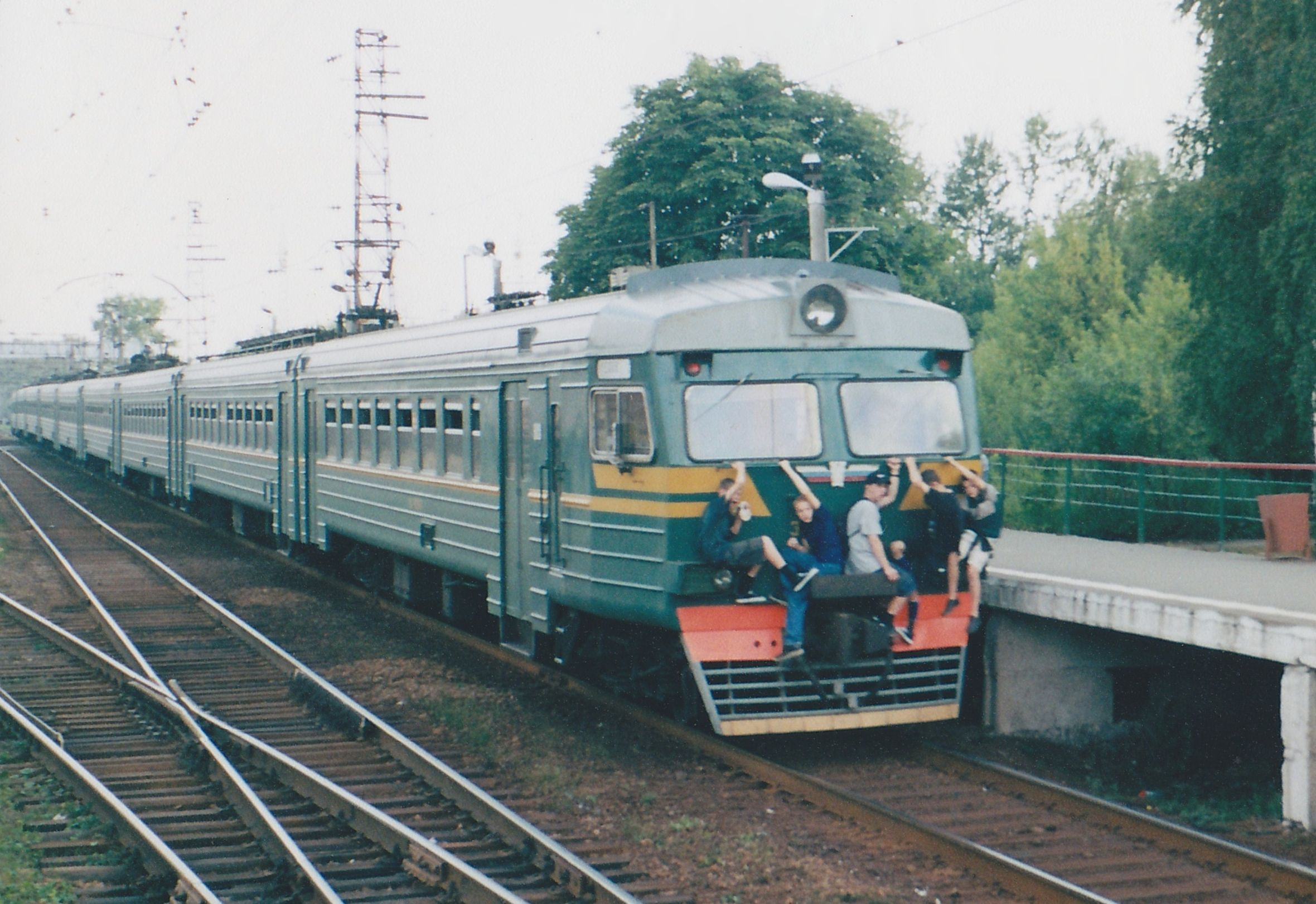
A group of stowaways traveling outside a commuter train in Shcherbinka, Russia

Some undocumented migrants travel around Europe in trucks and trains without being detected. A number of them try to get to other European countries, such as France and the United Kingdom.

=== Land travel ===
Stowaways sometimes hide themselves in vehicles such as cargo trucks to get between cities. Although this is also done by migrants who have paid the driver, it is also done by individuals hiding from the driver. In some places, drivers are legally responsible for making sure that stowaways do not board their vehicles, and can be fined or jailed if they do not detect and remove a stowaway when crossing national borders.

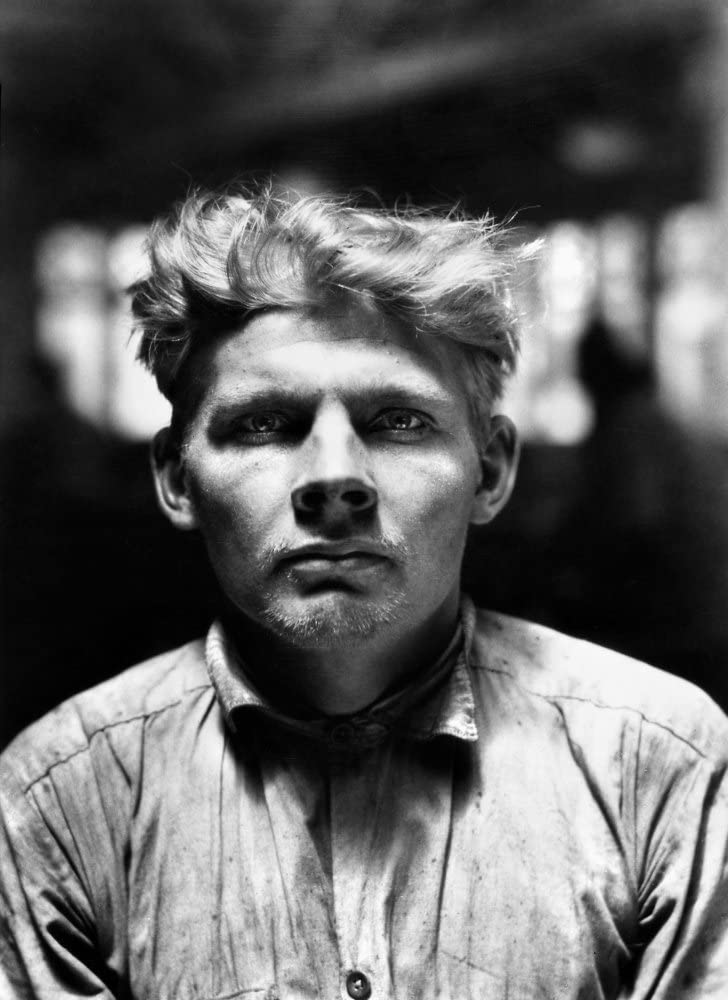
A Finnish stowaway caught illegally entering the United States, photographed on Ellis Island, 1926. Original caption: The desire to come to America must have been very strong for this young man to face all sorts of uncertainties.

=== Ship travel ===
Stowaways on sailing ships and on steamships made this way of illicit travel known throughout the world. Throughout the nineteenth and twentieth centuries poor, would-be emigrants and travelers seeking adventure for no cost helped to make it seem romantic. Noted stowaways to America by steamship have included Henry Armetta, Bruno Richard Hauptmann, Willem de Kooning, Jan Valtin, and Florentino Das.

Stowaways typically board the ship while it is in port. This can be by the gangway or by climbing the ships side when the crew are not maintaining an adequate security watch of the vessel. To prevent stowaways on ships, the International Chamber of Shipping and Witherbys provide guidance to ships on managing the risks associated with stowaways and with rescue of displaced persons at sea. The International Maritime Organization have also issued revised guidelines for the prevention of access by stowaways.

=== Air travel ===
Poor perimeter security at a number of airports around the world can make it easier for people to stow away on planes. Aviation authorities worry about stowaways because poor security also makes them vulnerable to terrorists and other malicious actors.

Stowaways in aircraft wheel wells face numerous health risks, many of which are fatal: being mangled when the undercarriage retracts, tinnitus, deafness, hypothermia, hypoxia, frostbite, acidosis and finally falling when the doors of the compartment reopen. The landing gear compartment is not equipped with heating, pressure or oxygen, which are vital for survival at a high altitude. According to experts, at 18,000 feet (5,500 m), hypoxia causes lightheadedness, weakness, vision impairment and tremors. By 22,000 feet (6,700 m) the oxygen level of the blood drops and the person will struggle to stay conscious. Above 33,000 feet (10,000 m) their lungs would need artificial pressure to operate normally. The temperature could drop as low as −63 °C (−81 °F) which causes severe hypothermia. Those stowaways who managed to not be crushed by the retracting undercarriage or killed by the deadly conditions would most likely be unconscious when the compartment door re-opens during the approach and fall several thousand feet to their deaths.

David Learmount, an aviation expert of Flight International, told BBC about a lot of ignorance in this area. He suggested that no one would be willing to risk such a journey having full understanding of this kind of ordeal. Stowaways who survived usually travelled relatively short distances or at a low altitude. Two cases are known of people who survived at an altitude of about 38,000 feet (12,000 m) – a man on an 8-hour flight, whose body core temperature fell to 79 °F (26 °C), and a 16-year-old boy who was unharmed by a 5.5 hour flight, despite losing consciousness. Almost all aircraft stowaways are male.

Aside from risk to themselves, aircraft stowaways can also cause significant risk and stress to others when impacted equipment compromises safety, as well as significant cost of equipment repair, damage to aircraft on landing, and runway closures. In 1994, Flight PH844 discovered the body of a deceased male stowaway was jamming the starboard carriageway. After 3.5 hours of maneuvers attempting to dislodge the body, the flight made an emergency landing using only the nosewheel and port undercarriage. The air force of another country was required to assist with moving the damaged plane from the runway.

In 1965, Brian Robson attempted to mail himself in a crate on a flight from Melbourne, Australia to London. The flight was diverted to Los Angeles, where he was discovered after four days in the crate. In one reported case, in 2003, a young man mailed himself in a large box and had it shipped on UPS planes from New York City to Texas. He survived because the box travelled in a pressurized hold of an aircraft.

From 1947 until September 2012, there were 96 known stowaway attempts worldwide in wheel wells of 85 separate flights, which resulted in 73 deaths with only 23 survivors.

In 2024 and 2026 Svetlana Dali successfully boarded commercial flights from New York to Europe without a ticket or passport by evading security measures and airport gate agents.

== Legal consequences ==
Stowaways may risk being fined or imprisoned, since it is illegal in most jurisdictions to embark on aircraft, boats or trains as stowaways. Airports, sea ports and train stations are typically marked as "no trespassing" or "private property" zones to anyone but customers and employees. Seaports, train stations, and airports often attempt further security by designating restricted areas with signs saying "Authorized Personnel Only".

Since the September 11 attacks, it has become more difficult to be a stowaway on board transportation arriving to or departing from the United States. Airport security has dramatically increased, and among the new security measures is trained professionals watching over the fences from which stowaways usually gain entrance to an airport's runway.

== See also ==
- Francis of Assisi, patron saint of, among other things, stowaways
- Deadly Voyage
- Freedom of Movement
- Human mail
- Illegal emigration
- Marilyn Hartman
- Perce Blackborow
- Train surfing (Freighthopping)
- Air Canada masked stowaway case
- Theft of services
