= San Isidro, Northern Samar =

Municipality in Northern Samar, Philippines

San Isidro
- Municipality
- Municipality of San Isidro
- Seal

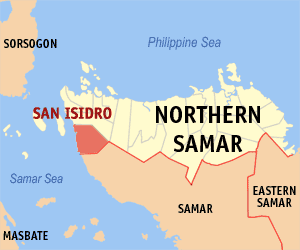
- Map of Northern Samar with San Isidro highlighted
- Interactive map of San Isidro
- Location within the Philippines
- Coordinates: 12°23′17″N 124°19′52″E
- Country: Philippines
- Region: Eastern Visayas
- Province: Northern Samar
- District: 1st district
- Founded: June 20, 1954
- Named for: Isidore the Laborer
- Barangays: 14 (see Barangays)

Government
  - Type: Sangguniang Bayan
  - Mayor: Conrado G. Avila, Sr.
  - Vice Mayor: Ferdinand C. Avila
  - Representative: Niko Raul Daza
  - Councilors: List: • Wilson A. Tomacas; • Agnes A. Jao; • Norejan S. Elaco; • Leila P. Beltran; • Zaldy F. Amor; • Joel C. Sampayan; • Mervin M. Mondigo; • Ferie L. Francisco; DILG Masterlist of Officials
  - Electorate: 19,644 voters (2025)

Area
  - Total: 255.90 km^{2} (98.80 sq mi)
- Elevation: 72 m (236 ft)
- Highest elevation: 494 m (1,621 ft)
- Lowest elevation: 0 m (0 ft)

Population (2024 census)
  - Total: 26,068
  - Density: 101.87/km^{2} (263.84/sq mi)
  - Households: 6,158

Economy
  - Income class: 2nd municipal income class
  - Poverty incidence: 26.01% (2023)
  - Revenue: ₱ 224.2 million (2024)
  - Assets: ₱ 677.4 million (2024)
  - Expenditure: ₱ 207.5 million (2024)
  - Liabilities: ₱ 146.9 million (2024)

Service provider
  - Electricity: Northern Samar Electric Cooperative (NORSAMELCO)
- Time zone: UTC+8 (PST)
- ZIP code: 6409
- PSGC: 0804818000
- IDD : area code: +63 (0)55
- Native languages: Waray; Tagalog

San Isidro, officially the Municipality of San Isidro (Waray: Bungto han San Isidro; Tagalog: Bayan ng San Isidro), is a municipality in the province of Northern Samar, Philippines. According to the 2024 census, it has a population of 26,068 people.

The town borders with Victoria to the north.

== History ==
San Isidro was originally part of the Municipality of Allen (formerly Minapa-a and La Granja). Its history dates back during the era of Spanish colonization, when Filipino natives were always on the run-traveling in search of uninhabited and remote place to hide and escape slavery and maltreatments of Spanish governments. The first human beings that have landed on Calagundian shores around the last quarter of the 19th century were some intrepid Bicolanos, Boholanos, Leyteños and Cebuanos pioneers. They came to the place by prodigious voyages using only the primitive boat called “velus”.

Later, during this period, other groups of immigrants were lured from the nearby island provinces and Bicol regions to the coastal plains of Calagundian. These families formed the nucleus of Barrio Calagundian, a part of La Granja town (now Allen). These people were basically engaged in fishing and farming as their only main sources of livelihood. Having progressed as the years passed by, more people coming from the islands of san Antonio, Capul, San Vicente, Almagro, Tagapul-an and even as far as Masbate and other far away places inhabited to Calagundian to seek for a more greener pastures. As a barrio, the Calagundianons, though they came from different places with different views and ideas, customs and traditions, were able to establish among themselves a happy and harmonious community, and they even considered themselves a one family community. These were the uniqueness of the people of Calagundian - determined, united and organized in their pursuit of becoming a cohesive political unit.

Finally, after years of political struggle for independence from its mother town Allen, the municipality of San Isidro was established by virtue of Republic Act No. 1187 on June 20, 1954. The law was originally known as House Bill No. 2132 when it was introduced at the Congress in 1952. The Poblacion, the seat of the Municipal Government, was formerly called Barrio Calagundian. The change of name came with the creation of the Municipality. The original barrios comprised by the Municipality per Republic Act No. 1187 were seven, namely, Calagundian, Erenas, Caaguit-itan, Palanit, San Juan, Veriato and San Roman. These barrios were separated from the Municipality of Allen and became the nucleus of the new Municipality.

Almost five years later, on May 16, 1959, Republic Act No. 2214 was passed creating seven additional barrios for San Isidro. These were San Roque, Sabelia, Happy Valley, Acedillo, Alegria, Salvacion and Mabuhay. However, with the creation of the Municipality of Victoria on April 27, 1968, the barrios of Erenas, Acedillo and San Roman were separated from San Isidro and formed part of Victoria. Meanwhile, on January 21, 1972, the Municipal Council approved Resolution No. 02 creating Barangay Eladio T. Balite, separating the same from Barangay Alegria. Later on, the Poblacion was divided in two, thereby creating Barangay Poblacion Norte and Barangay Poblacion Sur. As of this time, San Isidro has fourteen Barangays.

Following the 1965 Samar division plebiscite, it became part of the newly established province of Northern Samar.

Yearning a separate parish from that of Allen, Northern Samar, a church decree dated October 31, 1959, made it realized. Thus, the newly created parish had been given a juridical name as Parish of the Most Sacred Heart of Jesus. Its patron saint is San Isidro de Labrador whose feast is religiously celebrated every 15th day of May.

== Geography ==
San Isidro is a coastal a town in the south-western part of the province of Northern Samar facing the Samar Sea. It is about 64 kilometers (40 mi) from the capital town of Catarman and approximately 54 kilometers (34 mi) north-west of Calbayog. Its boundaries are defined by the Municipality of Victoria in the north and north-east, by the City of Calbayog in the south and southeast, the Municipality of Bobon in the east, and by Dalupiri Pass and Samar Sea in the west.

San Isidro has a total land area of 25,590 hectares (63,200 acres), of which 9088 is commercial forest, 418 is non-commercial forest, 10754 is logged cover area and rest are classified into reproduction brush land, cogon open land, mosey forest, cultivation, plantation and marsh swamp land.

The topography of the land is characterized from plains to rolling hills and steep mountain ranges. The lowlands are along the coast but in a few sections of this area, the mountains rise from 30 to 61 meters (98 to 200 ft) high above sea level. The highest elevation is Mount Soomong, which is 522 meters (1,713 ft) above sea level. The hinterlands are criss-crossed by logging roads and most of the plateaus are already developed agricultural lands.

Its rivers and creeks intersperse throughout the length and breadth of the municipality. It has ten (10) small unnavigable rivers. Majestic Mawo River traverses the eastern portion of the hinterlands finding its way at the town of Victoria before discharging into the Samar Sea. Among River has its outlet at Barangay Seven Hills, Caaguit-itan River at Barangays Alegria and Balite, San Juan River at Barangay San Juan, Palanit and Maludbalud Rivers at Barangay Palanit, Veriato River at Barangay Veriato and Caglanipao River at Barangay Caglanipao.

The Municipality does not lie along any known fault zones/lines. As to its bedrock foundations, old sediments and pyroclastics which are more stable than poorly consolidated sediments (e.g. limestone, shale or alluvial deposits) in terms of compressive strength/load bearing capacity comprise roughly 67.50% of the total municipal land area. The remaining 32.50% is composed of metamorphosed rocks, volcanic and highly crystallized rocks which are situated in areas of highest relief.

Mineral production consists mainly of non-metallic such as sand, gravel, earth and rocks. Enormous quantities of these materials were used for the construction of the Pan-Philippine Highway.

Approximately 10.35% of the total municipal land area is within the 0.15% slope limits. The remaining 89.65% belong to 15% and over. The low level ground classified as “A” comprised a meager 3.06% of the total land area and is located at the eastern and western sections of the municipality. Classes “B”, “C”, and “D” comprised 1.63%, 3.74% and 1.92%, respectively. The bulk of the land comprising 27.67% ranges from steeply undulating and rolling lands sloping in many directions and 61.98% classified as very steeply sloping lands.

Approximately, its land uses were distributed as follows:

1. Residential Areas - 1,214,903.00 square meters (13,077,107.1 sq ft)
2. Religious Areas - 17,143.00 square meters (184,525.7 sq ft)
3. Educational Areas - 365,672.37 square meters (3,936,064.6 sq ft)
4. Government Lot - 13,537.97 square meters (145,721.5 sq ft)
5. Commercial Lot - 682,209.66 square meters (7,343,243.7 sq ft)
6. Industrial Lot - 5,610.00 square meters (60,385.5 sq ft)
7. Agricultural Lands - 131,870,225.60 square meters (1.4194392950×10^{9} sq ft)
8. Roads - 16,845.00 square meters (181,318.1 sq ft)
9. Timberlands/Open Spaces - 21,042.00 square meters (226,494.2 sq ft)

=== Barangays ===
San Isidro is politically subdivided into 14 barangays. Each barangay consists of puroks and some have sitios.

- Alegria
- Balite
- Buenavista
- Caglanipao
- Happy Valley
- Mabuhay
- Palanit
- Poblacion Norte
- Poblacion Sur
- Salvacion
- San Juan
- San Roque
- Seven Hills
- Veriato

Twelve (12) of the fourteen barangays of San Isidro are coastal barangays and two (2) are hinterland barangays. The coastal barangays, starting from the south are Caglanipao, Veriato, Mabuhay, Palanit, San Juan, Salvacion, Alegria, Balite, Buenavista, Poblacion Sur, Poblacion Norte, and San Roque while the interior barangays are Seven Hills and Happy Valley.

The Poblacions faces the Samar Sea and comprises the town proper.

=== Climate ===
Climate data for San Isidro, Northern Samar
Month	Jan	Feb	Mar	Apr	May	Jun	Jul	Aug	Sep	Oct	Nov	Dec	Year
Mean daily maximum °C (°F)	27 (81)	28 (82)	29 (84)	30 (86)	31 (88)	30 (86)	29 (84)	29 (84)	29 (84)	29 (84)	29 (84)	28 (82)	29 (84)
Mean daily minimum °C (°F)	22 (72)	22 (72)	22 (72)	22 (72)	24 (75)	24 (75)	24 (75)	24 (75)	24 (75)	24 (75)	23 (73)	23 (73)	23 (74)
Average precipitation mm (inches)	84 (3.3)	59 (2.3)	58 (2.3)	55 (2.2)	93 (3.7)	133 (5.2)	149 (5.9)	125 (4.9)	155 (6.1)	165 (6.5)	140 (5.5)	136 (5.4)	1,352 (53.3)
Average rainy days	18.1	13.6	15.8	16.1	21.7	25.5	26.6	25.1	24.8	25.8	22.7	20.1	255.9
Source: Meteoblue

The Municipality has no distinct dry and wet seasons. The number of rainy days ranges from 12 in April and May to 26 in November or an average of 16.6 rainy days a month. On the other hand, the longest sunshine is in May, 8, 7 days and the shortest is in January, 4, 9 days, an average of 6.8 days a month.

== Demographics ==
Population census of San Isidro
Year	Pop.	±% p.a.
1960	9,453	—
1970	12,697	+2.99%
1975	15,182	+3.65%
1980	15,994	+1.05%
1990	18,353	+1.39%
1995	22,991	+4.31%
2000	22,847	−0.13%
2007	23,573	+0.43%
2010	24,952	+2.09%
2015	26,650	+1.26%
2020	27,867	+0.94%
2024	26,068	−1.59%
Source: Philippine Statistics Authority

=== Population size ===
Per official NSO Census of Population report, the total population of the municipality, as of 2020 is 27,867 persons. This population of the municipality comprises 4.36% of the province’ total population.

=== Average growth rate ===
The 1970 Census of Population indicated a growth rate of 2.99% for the past ten years. This was followed by an accelerating rate of 3.64% from 1970 to 1975. However, during the intercensal periods of 1975 to 1980 and 1980 to 1990, respectively, growth rate markedly dropped to 1.05% and 1.38%, respectively. During the intercensal period of 1990–1995, the population of the municipality grew at a very high rate of 4.61% annually. This is 3.23 percentage points higher than the average growth rate between 1980 and 1990. However, from 1995 to 2000, municipal population markedly dropped registering a growth rate of -0.13. The first major decline in the census growth rate occurred between 1975 and 1980.

=== Sex composition ===
The male population of the municipality numbered 11,875, as of September 1, 1995, or 759 persons more than female population of 11,116. However, there was a change in the sex ratio from 1990 to 1995. The 1995 census indicated a sex ratio of 107 males per 100 females. In the 1990 census, this was 108.

=== Density ===
Vis-à-vis the municipality's total population of 255.9 square kilometers (98.8 sq mi) and total population of 22,847 persons as of 2020, the municipality gives a population density of 110 inhabitants per square kilometer or 280 inhabitants per square mile.

=== Mortality rate ===
Record of the Municipal Health Office shows that as of 1995, total number of deaths rated to 6.8% or a total of 157 persons.

=== Number of households ===
The total number of households in the municipality during the 2000 Census of the Philippine Statistics Authority accounted to 4,184. Meanwhile, in the 1995 Census, the municipality registered 4,202 households, registering an increase of 611 households (17% increase) over the 1990 census figure of 3,591 households.

=== Size of households ===
The average household size from 1995 to 2000 registered to 5.5 (or 6) persons, which is higher than in 1990 (5.1 persons). This means that for every 100 households, the reported number of members increased by 40 persons.

=== Birth rate ===
Based on the Municipal Health record, total number of birth as of 1995 registered to 526 or a rate of 2.29%.

=== Language ===
With reference to the records of the Philippine Statistics Authority, majority of the household population of the municipality spoke Waray language (50.59%) mostly during their early childhood. The remaining 49.41% spoke Cebuano (46.32%), Abaknon (1.43%), and other dialects (1.66%.

=== Religion ===
Religious Affiliation. Of the total 118,352 household population I 1990, Roman Catholics numbered 5,667. It comprised a large percentage, or about 85.37%. United Church of Christ in the Philippines followed with a total o,477 or 8.07%. The Iglesia ni Cristo registered third with 582 followers or about 3.17% Seventh Day Adventist ranked fourth with 230 or 11.25%. The remaining 2.16% were affiliated to Jehovah's Witnesses (0.62%), Born Again Christians (0.57%) and other religious sects (0.97%).

Religious Organizations. There are quite a number of religious organizations that are active in the locality both from the Roman Catholics and other religious sects. Among them are the Knight of Columbus, the Parish Pastoral Council, the Couple's for Christ, Women's for Christ, the Franciscan Youth (YOUFRA) and many others.

== Economy ==
Poverty incidence of San Isidro (%)

Source: Philippine Statistics Authority

=== Labor force ===
Among the 10,911 persons, 15 years old and over, only 5,989 persons or about 54.89% were economically active or in the labor force, which was 1,067 persons higher than those who were not in the labor force (4,922). The majority (40.57%) of the household population 15 years old and over who were in the labor force were males. While a largest percentage (34.63%) of those who were not in the labor force were females.

Of the 5,989 economically active populace (in the labor force), 5,400 (49.49%) were employed registering 4,811 higher than the unemployed (589 persons or 5.4%). The proportion of employed populace in the labor force was higher among males (38.58%) than among females (10.91%). On the other hand, the proportion of those who were unemployed was higher for females (3.41%) than males.

== Transportation ==
The municipality is located along the Daang Maharlika Highway and is a jumping board between the island towns of San Antonio and San Vicente, the City of Calbayog, and the capital town of Catarman. Because of its ferry terminal, located at Barangay Salvacion, it also becomes the gateway to Luzon.

The twelve coastal barangays can be reached by both land and sea transportation. The Daang Maharlika passes through all these barangays. While Seven Hills and Happy Valley can be reached by a barangay road passing through the barangays of Balite. Barangay Happy Valley, the most interior barangay in the whole municipality is connected with Barangay Dawo, Oquendo District, Calbayog, passing through the hinterlands.

== Healthcare ==
Health Facilities and Number of Health Personnel:

- Rural Health Unit - 1
- Barangay Health Centers - 6
- Private Medical Clinic - 1
- Private Dental Clinic - 1
- Number of Midwives - 10
- Number of Barangay Health Workers - 104
- Public Health Nurse - 1

== Education ==
Literacy Rate: Census results of 1990 show that of the 13,217 household population 10 years old and over, 85.4 percent were literate, while only 14.6% or 1,929 illiterate. The proportion who were literate was slightly higher among males, registering a figure of 6,833 or 51.62% than females which accounted to 6,394 or 48.38%. Comparatively therefore, the literate rural population numbered 7,376 or 1,535 literates more than the urban population of 5,841.

Highest Grade Completed: The largest percentage (60.81%) of the 14,610 population 7 years old and over attended or completed elementary education only. Meanwhile, the proportion who reached or completed high school posted a percentage of 22.03% or 3,219 persons. The proportion, on the other hand, that was academic degree holders accounted to 328 or 2.25% of the total household population 7 years old and over.

=== Elementary schools ===
Presently, there are 13 elementary schools found in the Poblacion and in the different barangays throughout the municipality. These schools are composed of primary and intermediate grade levels.

=== Secondary schools ===
There are five secondary schools in the municipality. Three three are national high schools - one in Barangay Alegria, Barangay Veriato and the other one in the Poblacion. The third is the San Isidro Agro-Industrial School located in Barangay San Roque and has also extension classes at Barangay Salvacion and lastly the private school of Tan Ting Bing Memorial Colleges, Inc.

=== Vocational schools ===
To cater the educational demands of the high school graduates of these secondary schools in the locality, a two-year post secondary courses were once offered at San Isidro Agro-Industrial School, through TESDA in the school year 1998 to 2001. However, due to the residents' clamor - particularly the parents and the students for a four-year course, bachelor's degree on BS in Agriculture Education was subsequently offered at the same school through the extension program of the University of Eastern Philippines in June 2001. To date the said course offering is still on-going and obviously, benefited quite a number of students in the area. Private school, Tan Ting Bing Memorial Colleges, Inc. is also offering various of short courses and bachelor's degree courses.
