= Marilyn Hartman =

American regular flight stowaway

Marilyn Jean Hartman
- Born: 1951 or 1952 (age 74–75)
- Known for: Stowing away on commercial airline flights

Marilyn Hartman (born 1951 or 1952), known as the Serial Stowaway, is an American woman known for stowing away on at least 22 commercial airline flights since 2014. She has been widely dubbed a "real-life Ada Quonsett" after the infamous "harmless little old lady and habitual stowaway" character, played by Helen Hayes, from the 1970 movie Airport.

Hartman's attorneys said in 2021 that she is mentally ill and that her stowaway conduct is a compulsive behavior. Hartman is homeless and believes a worldwide conspiracy, operating with the permission of Barack Obama, has spent decades harassing her and that it triggers a "fight or flight" response that compels her to "get on a plane to go away." In March 2022, Hartman pleaded guilty in Cook County Court to felony counts of criminal trespass and escape from electronic monitoring and was sentenced to 42 months in prison.

== History ==
Hartman has stowed away, or attempted to do so, on at least 22 commercial flights from airports across the US; of the incidents, eight occurred in Chicago-area airports. In a 2021 interview, Hartman said that she had boarded flights without a ticket at least 30 times, and that her first successful stowaway flights were to Copenhagen and Paris. Her first documented attempt was in February 2014, when she successfully passed San Francisco International Airport (SFO) security and boarded a flight to Hawaii; she was apprehended after the real ticket-holder arrived on board. Three days later, she made another attempt at SFO but was stopped at the security checkpoint. Two days later, she was discovered at SFO with another person's discarded boarding pass.

On August 4, 2014, Hartman boarded a flight from Mineta San Jose International Airport to Los Angeles International Airport without a ticket. Flight attendants detected her upon landing in Los Angeles, and Hartman was arrested and charged with trespassing.

On February 9, 2015, Hartman flew from Minnesota to Jacksonville, Florida without a ticket. She was arrested in Jacksonville after checking into a hotel under another person's name when that person arrived at the hotel. She was charged with fraud by impersonation and other crimes. In February 2016, she pleaded guilty to trespassing but served less than a year in jail. At the time, Hartman was living in a mental health facility in Chicago's Near North Side.

On January 14, 2018, Hartman snuck onto a British Airways flight from Chicago O'Hare to London Heathrow; prosecutors said that she had walked past two TSA Precheck agents by using her hair to conceal her face. Hartman had failed the previous day to board a flight to Connecticut, but had stayed overnight at O'Hare. Not having a passport, British immigration officials sent her back to the U.S., where she was arrested and charged with theft. She pleaded guilty to one count of trespassing at an airport and the other charges were dismissed; Hartman was sentenced to 18 months' probation and mental health counseling, and was banned from being on any airport property without a valid ticket in her name.

On October 11, 2019, Hartman was arrested while trying to pass through security without a boarding pass or identification, again at O'Hare. At the time Hartman was still on probation from the London incident. She was detained at the Cook County Jail until 2020, when she was released from jail as part of initiatives to prevent the transmission of COVID-19.

On March 16, 2021, Hartman was arrested at O'Hare prior to reaching TSA checkpoints. She was detected after she left the transitional housing facility where she was staying and her electronic monitor triggered an alarm. She claimed she was compelled to flee to the airport when she became upset after an interview she had conducted with WBBM-TV had unexpectedly aired.

On March 3, 2022, Hartman pleaded guilty in Cook County Court to felony trespass and escape from electronic monitoring and was sentenced to three years and six months in prison for both charges, but she received credit for two years and five months already served. Prosecutors had dropped all other pending charges. In a statement, Hartman explained that she was "happy to move on with my life."

== Reaction ==
In March 2021, the Chicago Tribune columnist Eric Zorn described Hartman's conduct as a "sad story" and said interviews with her revealed "no hint of menace, but plenty of pathos, paranoia, and confusion." He wrote that Hartman had revealed "holes and vulnerabilities in airport security" and that her case called for mental health treatment "in a safe, therapeutic setting" rather than imprisonment.
