= Victoria, Northern Samar =

Municipality in Northern Samar, Philippines

Victoria
- Municipality
- Municipality of Victoria
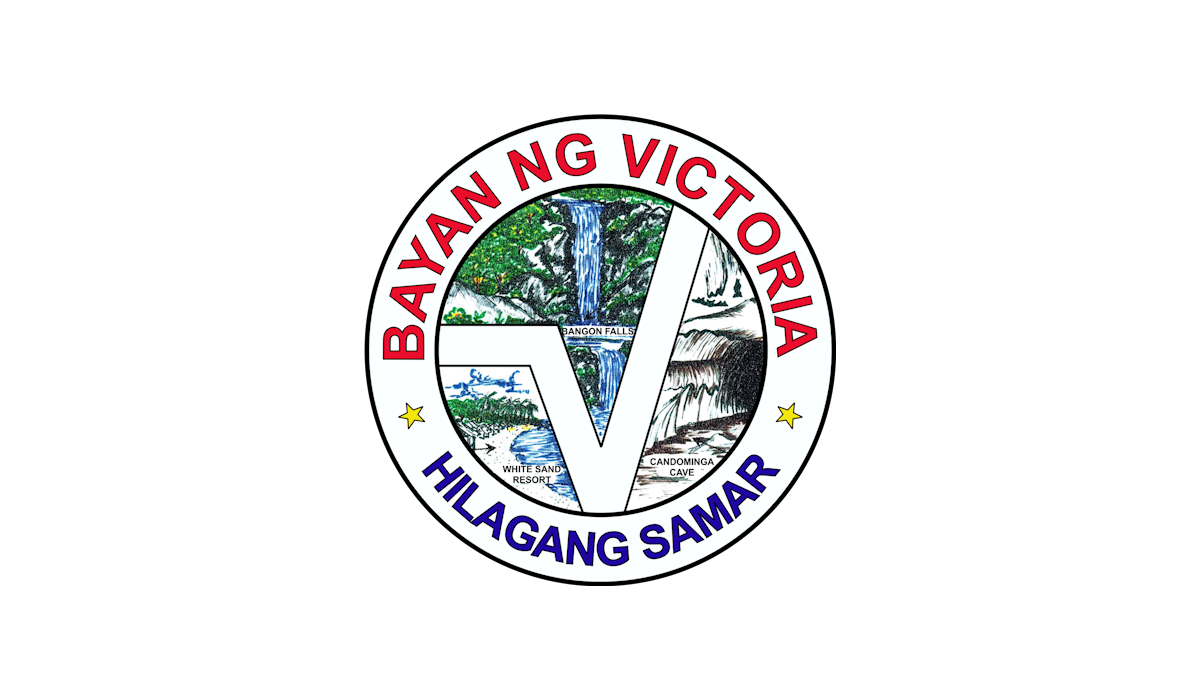
- Flag Seal

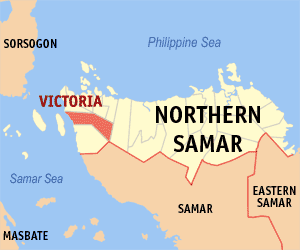
- Map of Northern Samar with Victoria highlighted
- Interactive map of Victoria
- Location within the Philippines
- Coordinates: 12°27′N 124°19′E
- Country: Philippines
- Region: Eastern Visayas
- Province: Northern Samar
- District: 1st district
- Founded: April 27, 1968
- Named for: Victoria Quirino
- Barangays: 16 (see Barangays)

Government
  - Type: Sangguniang Bayan
  - Mayor: Jose G. Ardales
  - Vice Mayor: Anselmo P. Aliluya, Jr.
  - Representative: Paul R. Daza
  - Councilors: List: • Kristine P. Sabayo; • Joerge U. Ardales; • Eugenio G. Laurente; • Rufino A. Subiaga; • Alex M. Manatad; • Jude Rey Julius F. Lucinario; • Ben G. Mandrilla; • Eddie E. Cabacang; DILG Masterlist of Officials
  - Electorate: 12,737 voters (2025)

Area
  - Total: 186.70 km^{2} (72.09 sq mi)
- Elevation: 46 m (151 ft)
- Highest elevation: 256 m (840 ft)
- Lowest elevation: −3 m (−9.8 ft)

Population (2024 census)
  - Total: 16,085
  - Density: 86.154/km^{2} (223.14/sq mi)
  - Households: 3,525

Economy
  - Income class: 4th municipal income class
  - Poverty incidence: 26.48% (2023)
  - Revenue: ₱ 136.3 million (2024)
  - Assets: ₱ 562.3 million (2024)
  - Expenditure: ₱ 31.71 million (2024)
  - Liabilities: ₱ 173.6 million (2024)

Service provider
  - Electricity: Northern Samar Electric Cooperative (NORSAMELCO)
- Time zone: UTC+8 (PST)
- ZIP code: 6406
- PSGC: 0804823000
- IDD : area code: +63 (0)55
- Native languages: Waray; Tagalog

Victoria, officially the Municipality of Victoria (Waray: Bungto han Victoria; Tagalog: Bayan ng Victoria), is a municipality in the province of Northern Samar, Philippines. According to the 2024 census, it has a population of 16,085 people.

It borders with the town of Allen in the north and San Isidro in the southwest.

== History ==
On April 27, 1968, barrios Buena Suerte, Buenos Aires, Colabog, Mawo, Maxvilla, San Lazaro, and San Miguel from the municipality of Allen and Acedillo, Erenas, and San Ramon from San Isidro were separated and constituted into a new and separate municipality known as Victoria, by virtue of Republic Act No. 5193. Mawo was designated as the municipal seat of government. The first set of Victoria municipal officials was elected in the following election of 1969.

== Geography ==
=== Barangays ===
Victoria is politically subdivided into 16 barangays. Each barangay consists of puroks and some have sitios.

- Acedillo
- Buenasuerte
- Buenos Aires
- Colab-og
- Erenas
- Libertad
- Luisita
- Lungib
- Maxvilla
- Pasabuena
- Zone I (Poblacion)
- Zone II (Poblacion)
- Zone III (Poblacion)
- San Lazaro
- San Miguel
- San Roman

=== Climate ===
Climate data for Victoria, Northern Samar
Month	Jan	Feb	Mar	Apr	May	Jun	Jul	Aug	Sep	Oct	Nov	Dec	Year
Mean daily maximum °C (°F)	27 (81)	28 (82)	29 (84)	30 (86)	31 (88)	30 (86)	29 (84)	29 (84)	29 (84)	29 (84)	29 (84)	28 (82)	29 (84)
Mean daily minimum °C (°F)	22 (72)	22 (72)	22 (72)	22 (72)	24 (75)	24 (75)	24 (75)	24 (75)	24 (75)	24 (75)	23 (73)	23 (73)	23 (74)
Average precipitation mm (inches)	84 (3.3)	59 (2.3)	58 (2.3)	55 (2.2)	93 (3.7)	133 (5.2)	149 (5.9)	125 (4.9)	155 (6.1)	165 (6.5)	140 (5.5)	136 (5.4)	1,352 (53.3)
Average rainy days	18.1	13.6	15.8	16.1	21.7	25.5	26.6	25.1	24.8	25.8	22.7	20.1	255.9
Source: Meteoblue

== Demographics ==
Population census of Victoria
Year	Pop.	±% p.a.
1970	6,996	—
1975	9,149	+5.53%
1980	9,551	+0.86%
1990	9,043	−0.55%
1995	11,291	+4.25%
2000	11,632	+0.64%
2007	12,623	+1.13%
2010	13,920	+3.62%
2015	14,817	+1.20%
2020	15,361	+0.76%
2024	16,085	+1.11%
Source: Philippine Statistics Authority

== Economy ==
Poverty incidence of Victoria (%)

Source: Philippine Statistics Authority

== Local government ==
Elected officials:

- Mayor: Jose Ardales
- Vice Mayor: Anselmo Aliluya Jr.
- Councilors:
1. Jorge Ardales
2. Jonay Sabido
3. Anselmo Aliluya
4. Rufino Subiaga
5. Fe Viloria
6. Eugenio Laurente
7. Marcos Porteles
8. Jude rey Lucinario
