= Charlotte May Pierstorff =

American shipped through the post

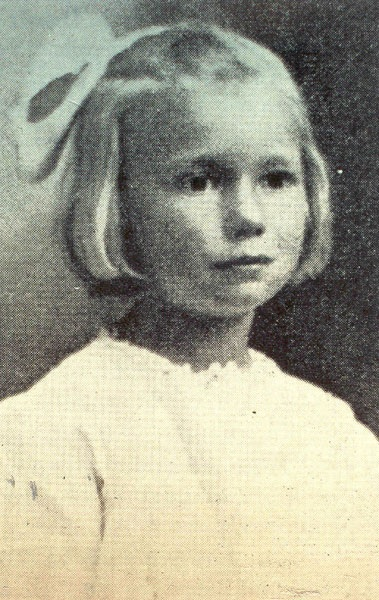
- Born: May 12, 1908
- Died: April 25, 1987 (aged 78)
- Known for: Being shipped through the U.S. Mail

Charlotte May Pierstorff (May 12, 1908 – April 25, 1987) was an American girl of German descent who was shipped alive through the United States postal system by parcel post on February 19, 1914. After the incident, parcel post regulations were changed to prohibit the shipment of humans.

In 1997, Michael O. Tunnell wrote a children's book, Mailing May, revolving around May's childhood.

== Mailing ==
On February 19, 1914, then five-year-old Charlotte May Pierstorff was mailed from Grangeville, Idaho to Lewiston, Idaho to visit her grandmother C. G. Vennigerholz, as this was cheaper than buying a train ticket. Charlotte, who weighed 48.5 pounds (22.0 kg) at the time, rode in the mail car with 32¢ of postage on her coat (equivalent to $10 in 2025).

Leonard Mochel, May's mother's cousin and railway postal clerk, accompanied her during the trip and delivered her to her grandmother's house.

This event indirectly caused the United States Post Office to bar from mail delivery all humans as well as live animals (with few exceptions, bees and day-old poultry amongst them).
