= Florentino Das =

Filipino sailor

- Born: Florentino Resulta Das; April 19, 1918; Allen, Samar, Insular Government of the Philippine Islands. U.S.
- Died: October 7, 1964 (aged 46); Manila, Third Philippine Republic
- Other name: Tinoy
- Occupations: Boat builder Fisherman
- Organization: Timarau Club
- Known for: First solo Trans-Pacific Crossing from Hawaii to the Philippines by a Filipino

Florentino Resulta Das (April 19, 1918 – October 7, 1964) was a U.S.-based Filipino yachtsman who holds the earliest record of single-handed sailing from Hawaii to the Philippines on a 27-footer homebuilt sailboat.

== Early years ==
Das was born in the northernmost town of Allen, Northern Samar to Domingo Das and Juliana Resulta. Having been exposed at an early age in traditional fishing, and learning this in the most treacherous waters of the San Bernardino Strait, Das has picked the skills of boat handling. Allen is also the terminus of the ferry between Luzon and Samar, and this has impressed upon Das to pursue a life of seafaring. His father also owned a traditional 60-foot double-outrigger sailing boat called a paraw, which is powered by a crab-claw sail along with a small foresail. With the paraw, the Das patriarch and his sons conducted trading around Eastern and Central Visayas. Part of his learning was also in the traditional knowledge of boat building, wayfinding, celestial navigation, and weather forecasting. Das shared "Me, I have loved them (boats) since I was a kid. Whenever my father was building a new boat, I was sure to be there beside him, when I was still very little."

At the age of 12, Das got into trouble with his local school authorities, and thus he fled to the neighboring town of Lavezares, where he found work as a cabin boy in the inter-island ferry. Das found his way to the capital Manila later on, and survived by taking various jobs, such as a stevedore or boat crewman.

In February 1934 he boarded the English freighter Silverbeam as a stowaway, but was discovered after a few days en route to San Francisco. The captain put him and his fellow stowaway to work, and by the time they arrived in Hawaii he was given a choice whether to offload or continue to San Francisco with a guaranteed work on board the ship. Das opted to disembark, and arrived in Honolulu at the age of 16.

In Hawaii, Das took on work as a ship scalar, chipper and painter for interisland vessels, a security guard, and as a vocation he also pursued an amateur boxing career.

He met his wife, Gloria Lorita Espartino, a Filipino-American who grew up in Hawaii, and gave Das eight children.

During World War II Das was employed as a fishing boat captain and learned modern navigation.

== Solo sailing ==
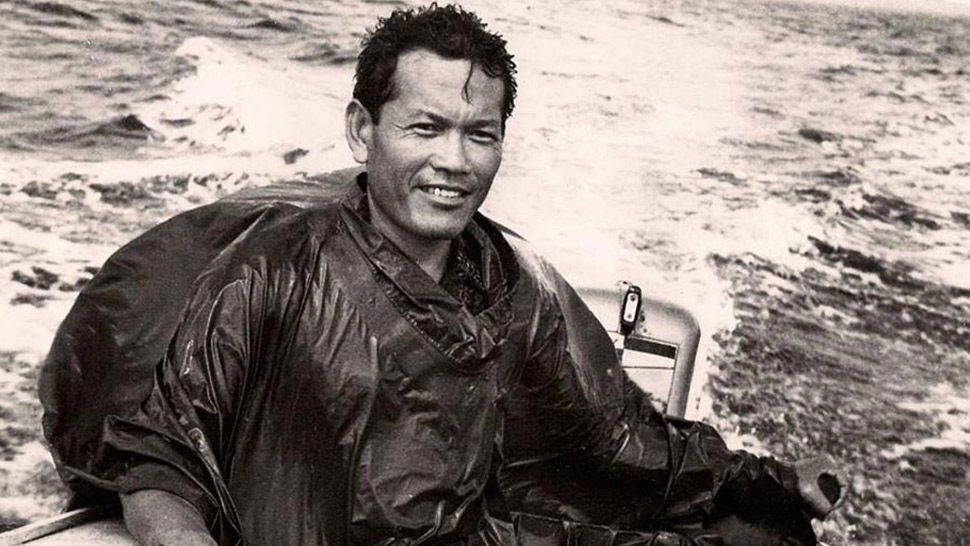
Florentino Das as documented by the Philippine press, and the municipality of Sta. Monica, Surigao del Norte.

Das was inspired by the French sailor Éric de Bisschop, who arrived in Hawaii from France on his sailboat Kaimiloa. Das was mentored by de Bisschop on modern sailing techniques, and in turn the former helped work on the repairs of de Bisschop's boat.

Receiving sponsorship from a local fraternity called Timarau Club, along with proceeds from the sale of three fishing boats Das was able to acquire a surplus US Navy S-Bottom hull. Along with his four sons, Das worked on the boat, and rigged it with canvas sails and a 25 hp outboard motor. He named the 24-foot sailboat Lady Timarau.

On May 14, 1955, Das slipped out of Kewalo Basin in Honolulu in front of family and friends, and sailed into open ocean without modern communication or navigational systems, except for a compass. A month into his adventure, after encountering a number of storms and damage to his boat, he came across a Japanese fishing vessel, Daisan Shinsei Maru, who offered to tow him to Ponape in Micronesia. His sponsor had requested that he return to Hawaii, but Das instead took on odd jobs for the next eight months to generate funding for the continuation of his trip.

During a radio interview, Das explained his desire to continue in his voyage as he "wanted to prove that Filipinos are not only good boxers but also good boatbuilders and sailors."

On February 22, 1956, Das was able to secure clearance from the local authorities and sailed off towards the Philippines. Along the way, Das passed Truk Island, the Hall Islands, as well as Yap Island, and finally on April 25, 1956, after almost 12 months into his personal adventure, he saw the Philippines for the first time in two decades, landing Siargao Island at Masayay, Alegria, in the town of Santa Monica, Surigao del Norte. The locals did not know who Das was, nor what he achieved, but he became a local curiosity. However, the news of his arrival soon spread and the Philippine Navy dispatched a ship to escort Das on his plan to return to his hometown of Allen, Northern Samar, where he was welcomed as a local town hero.

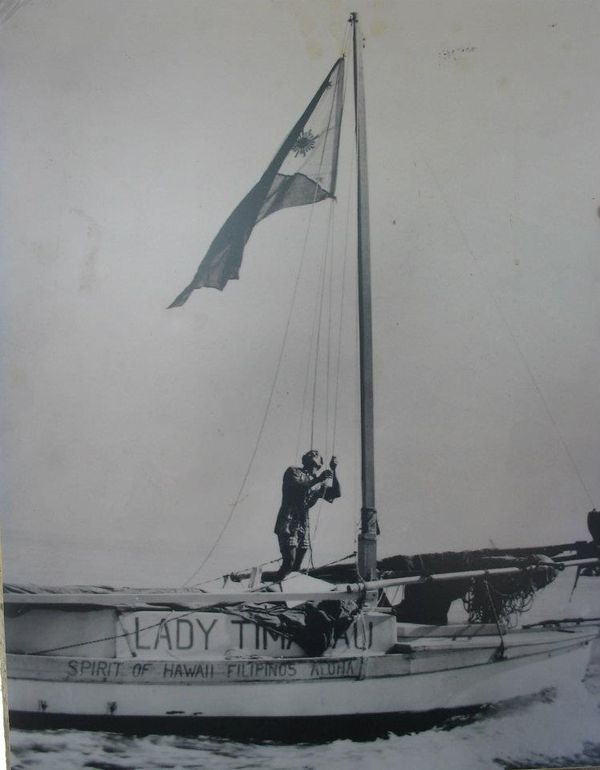
Florentino Das raising the Philippine Flag on his yacht Lady Timarau.

In Manila, President Ramon Magsaysay received Das on May 11, 1956, with a fluvial parade along the Pasig River, and conferred him an honorary rank of Commodore of the Philippine Navy, as well as the Philippine Legion of Honor rank of Officer [OLH]. The Mayor of Manila Arsenio Lacson received a letter from his counterpart from Honolulu as hand carried by Das, and gave the latter Keys to the City.

== Later life and death ==
Shortly after arriving in the Philippines, Das found himself lacking in funding or a means of getting back to Hawaii. He tried to sell Lady Timarau to the Philippine government, but did not receive any positive feedback on this. He also found that his wife had divorced him during his absence. To make ends meet, he again took on odd jobs. He also met Herminia Cipriano, a school teacher whom he married on August 16, 1957. They were able to get hired as caretakers of a resort on Corregidor Island. Das was also hired by the Philippine Tourist and Travel Authority.

Das and his wife moved to Mindoro where his wife took on teaching job with the Divine Word College of San Jose. He attempted once more to sell the Lady Timarau to the Philippine government for it to be preserved in a museum, but the boat sank in the Pasig River in one of the storms. On the seventh anniversary of his feat, he celebrated by sailing solo once more, on a 27-footer utility boat from San Jose, Occidental Mindoro to Manila, but by this time he was already suffering from diabetes and was losing his vision because of glaucoma. Das was admitted to the Ramon Magsaysay Memorial Hospital for glaucoma surgery, but by 1964 his health was deteriorating and he lost his sight.

Das died on October 7, 1964, at the age of 46 due to uremia at a hospital in Manila. During his funeral, he was accorded Navy Honor Guards, and was buried at the Manila North Cemetery.

== Memorials ==
There are a number of memorials to commemorate his achievement:

- A memorial plaque in Kewalo Basin, Honolulu.
- A memorial plaque in Santa Monica, Surigao del Norte
- A historical marker and statue in Allen, Samar.
- One of the vessels of the Kaya ng Pinoy Foundation is named B/B Florentino Das
