= Henry Box Brown =

American slave, later abolitionist speaker and showman

Henry "Box" Brown
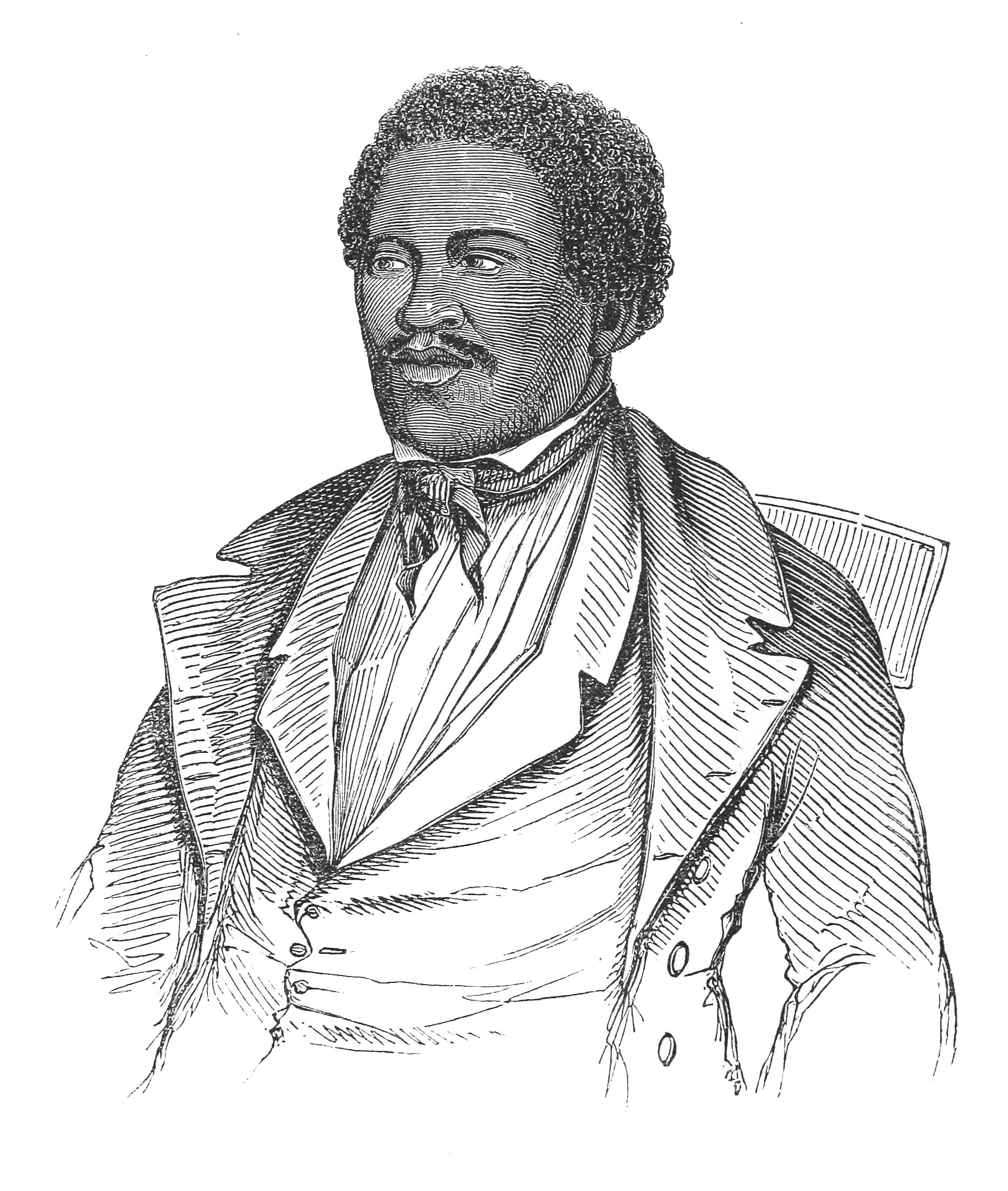
- Narrative of the Life of Henry Box Brown (1849)
- Born: Henry Brown c. 1815; Louisa County, Virginia, US
- Died: June 15, 1897 (aged 81–82); Toronto, Ontario, Canada
- Burial place: Toronto Necropolis, Ontario, Canada
- Occupations: Abolitionist, public speaker, magician, mesmerist
- Spouse(s): First wife – Nancy (sold by slaveowner); Second wife – Jane Floyd

Henry "Box" Brown (c. 1815 – June 15, 1897) was an enslaved man from Virginia who escaped to freedom at the age of 33 by arranging to have himself mailed in a wooden crate in 1849 to abolitionists in Philadelphia, Pennsylvania.

For a short time, Brown became a noted abolitionist speaker in the northeast United States. As a public figure and fugitive slave, Brown felt extremely endangered by the passage of the Fugitive Slave Act of 1850, which increased the pressure to capture escaped slaves. He moved to England and lived there for 25 years, touring with an anti-slavery panorama, and becoming a magician and showman.

Brown married and started a family with an English woman, Jane Floyd. Brown's first wife, Nancy, remained in slavery. Brown returned to the United States with his English family in 1875, where he continued to earn a living as an entertainer. He toured and performed as a magician, speaker, and mesmerist until at least 1889. The last decade of his life (1886–97) was spent in Toronto, where he died in 1897.

== Biography ==
=== Childhood and slavery ===
In 1815, Henry Brown was born into slavery on a plantation called Hermitage in Louisa County, Virginia. Henry was religious from an early age, stating that his mother was the one to instill Christian values into him. He is believed to have had at least two siblings, because he mentioned a brother and a sister in his autobiography. At age 15 he was sent to work in a tobacco factory in Richmond.

In his autobiography, Narrative of the Life of Henry Box Brown, Written by Himself, Brown describes his owner: "Our master was uncommonly kind, (for even a slaveholder may be kind) and as he moved about in his dignity he seemed like a god to us, but not with standing his kindness although he knew very well what superstitious notions we formed of him, he never made the least attempt to correct our erroneous impression, but rather seemed pleased with the reverential feelings which we entertained towards him."

=== Escape ===
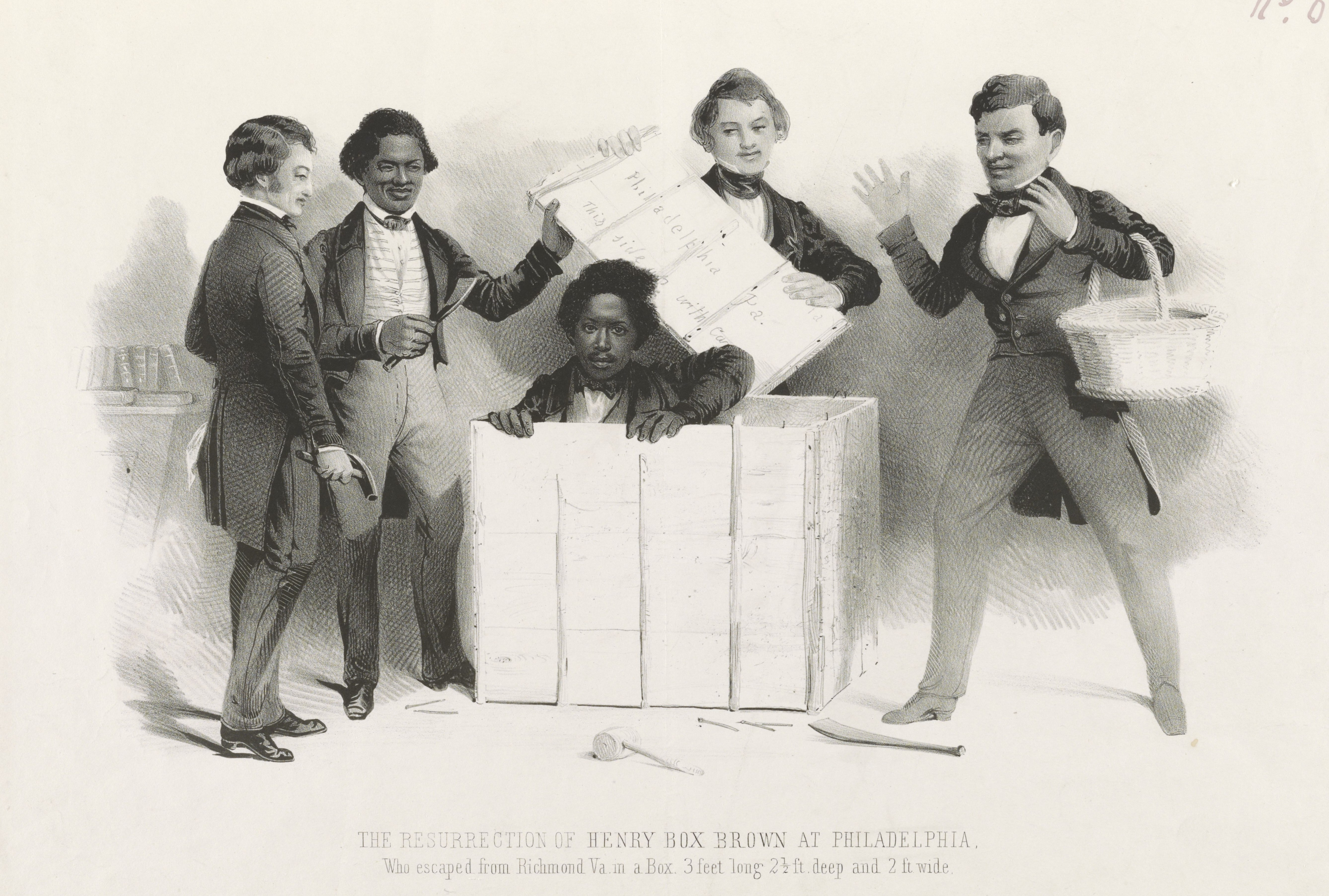
The Resurrection of Henry Box Brown at Philadelphia, a lithograph by Samuel Rowse (published in 1850).

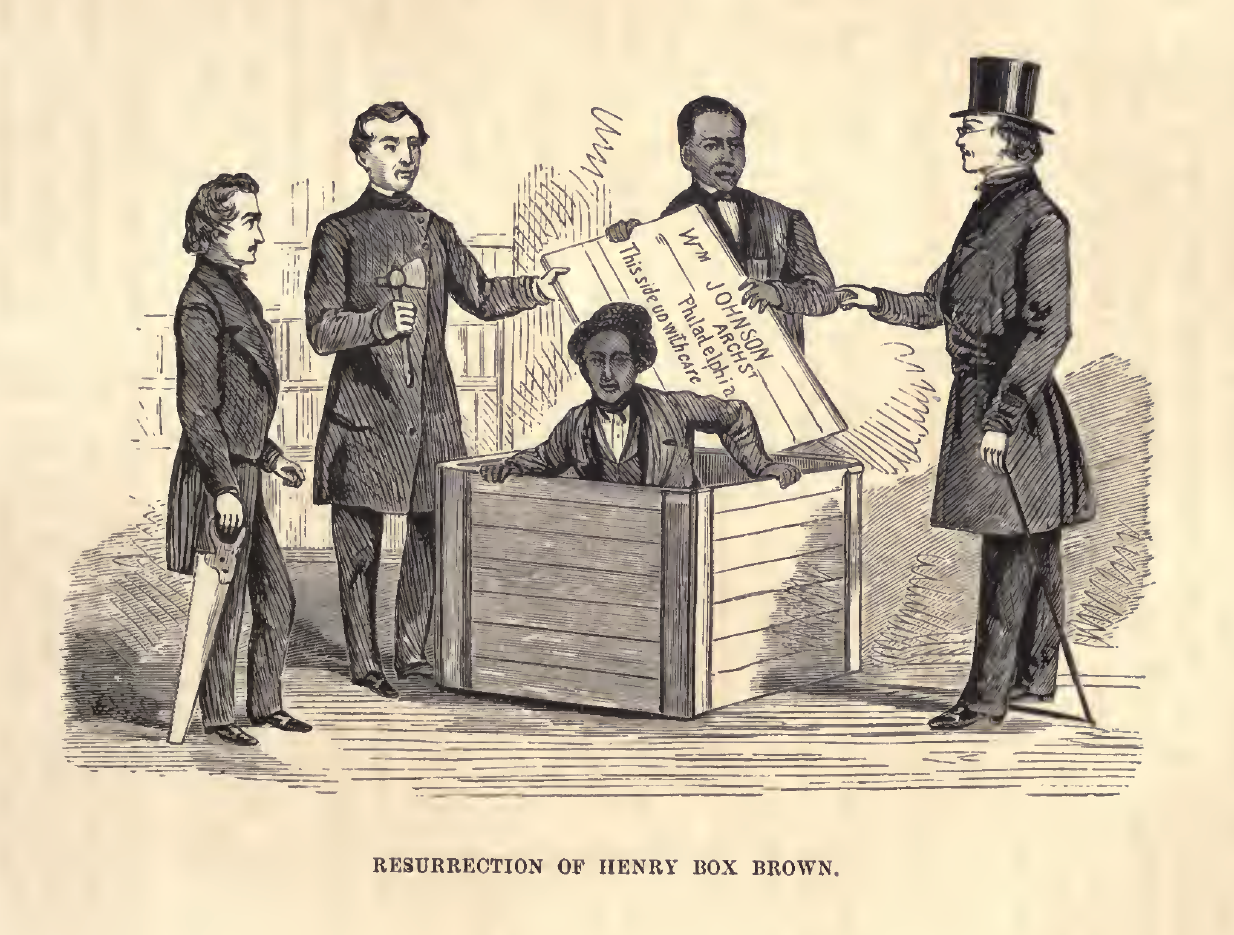
Another "Resurrection of Henry Box Brown" published with an account of the story in the William Still book The Underground Railroad (1872).

Brown was hired out by his master in Richmond, Virginia, and worked in a tobacco factory. In the twelve years that followed, he married an enslaved woman named Nancy and rented a house in which he lived with his wife and their three children. Brown had been paying his wife's master to not sell his family, but the latter betrayed Brown by selling Nancy, who was pregnant at the time, and their three children to a different slave owner, a minister in North Carolina.

In 1849, with the help of James C. A. Smith, a free black man, and a sympathetic white shoemaker named Samuel A. Smith (no relation), Brown devised a plan to have himself shipped in a box to a free state by the Adams Express Company, known for its confidentiality and efficiency. Brown paid US$86 (equivalent to $3,328 in 2025), which was more than half of his savings of US$166 (equivalent to $6,424 in 2025), to Samuel Smith.

Smith went to Philadelphia to consult members of the Pennsylvania Anti-Slavery Society on how to accomplish the escape, meeting with minister James Miller McKim, William Still, and Cyrus Burleigh. He corresponded with them to work out the details after returning to Richmond. They advised him to mail the box to the office of Quaker merchant Passmore Williamson, who was active with the Vigilance Committee.

To get out of work the day he was to escape, Brown burned his hand to the bone with sulfuric acid. The box in which Brown was shipped was 3 by 2.67 by 2 feet (91 by 81 by 61 cm) and displayed the words "dry goods" on it. It was lined with baize, a coarse woolen cloth. He carried only a small portion of water and a few biscuits. A single hole was cut for air, and the lid was nailed and tied with straps. Brown later wrote that his uncertain method of travel was worth the risk: "If you have never been deprived of your liberty, as I was, you cannot realize the power of that hope of freedom, which was to me indeed, an anchor to the soul both sure and steadfast."

On March 29, 1849, the trip finally began. Over the next 27 hours, Brown's box was transported by wagon, railroad, steamboat, wagon again, railroad, ferry, railroad, and finally delivery wagon. Despite the instructions on the box of "handle with care" and "this side up", carriers often placed the box upside-down or handled it roughly. Brown remained still, however, and avoided detection.

The following day, on March 30, the box was received by Williamson, McKim, William Still, and other members of the Philadelphia Vigilance Committee, attesting to the improvements in express delivery services. When Brown was released, one of the men remembered his first words as: "How do you do, gentlemen?" He sang a song modeled after Psalm 40, which he had earlier chosen to celebrate his release into freedom. After his arrival in Philadelphia, the city's Vigilance Committee sent Brown to New York City, and from there he traveled to New Bedford, Massachusetts, where he was received by abolitionist Joseph Ricketson.

In addition to celebrating Brown's inventiveness, Hollis Robbins noted: "The role of government and private express mail delivery is central to the story and the contemporary record suggests that Brown's audience celebrated his delivery as a modern postal miracle." The government postal service had dramatically increased communication and, despite southern efforts to control abolitionist literature, mailed pamphlets, letters, and other materials reached the South.

Cheap postage, Frederick Douglass observed in The North Star, had an "immense moral bearing". As long as federal and state governments respected the privacy of the mails, everyone and anyone could mail letters and packages; almost anything could be inside. In short, the power of prepaid postage delighted the increasingly middle-class and commercial-minded North and increasingly worried the slave-holding South.

Brown's escape highlighted the power of the mail system, which used a variety of modes of transportation to connect the East Coast. The Adams Express Company, a private mail service founded in 1840, marketed its confidentiality and efficiency. It was favored by abolitionist organizations and "promised never to look inside the boxes it carried".

=== Life in freedom ===
Brown became a well-known speaker for the Massachusetts Anti-Slavery Society and got to know Frederick Douglass. He was nicknamed "Box" at a Boston antislavery convention in May 1849, and thereafter used the name Henry Box Brown. He published two versions of his autobiography, Narrative of the Life of Henry Box Brown. The first, written with the help of Charles Stearns and conforming to expectations of the slave narrative genre, was published in Boston in 1849. The second was published in Manchester, England, in 1851, after he had moved there. While on the lecture circuit in the northeastern United States, Brown developed a moving panorama with his partner James C. A. Smith, which detailed both Brown's journey as well as the daily life of free and enslaved people. They separated in 1851.

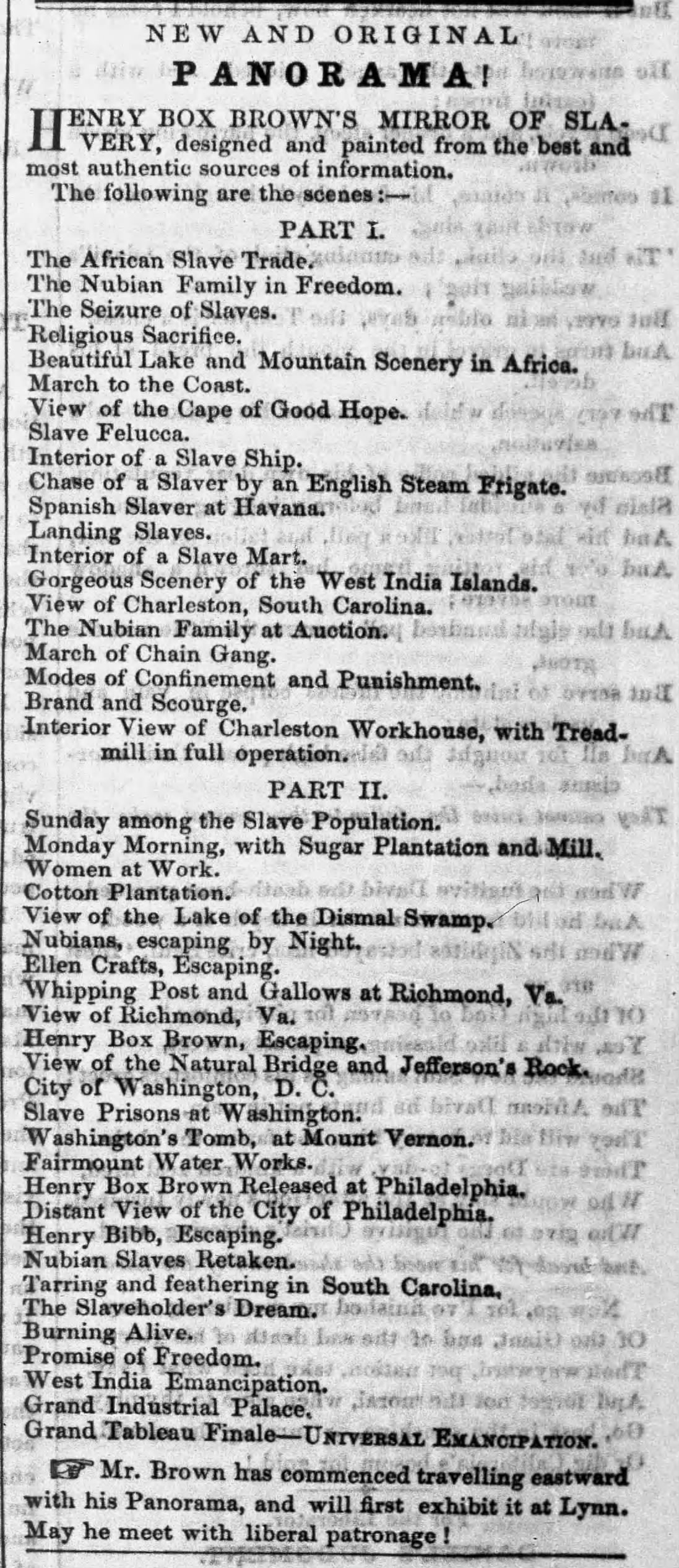
Featured topics of Brown's "New and Original Panorama!" as would be shown at a forthcoming event in Lynn, Massachusetts (The Liberator, May 3, 1850)

Douglass wished that Brown had not revealed the details of his escape, so that others might have used it. When Samuel Smith attempted to free other slaves in Richmond in 1849, they were arrested. The year of his escape, Brown was contacted by his wife's new owner, who offered to sell his family to him. Brown declined the offer. This was an embarrassment within the abolitionist community, which tried to keep the information private.

Brown is known for speaking out against slavery and expressing his feelings about the state of America. In his Narrative, he offers a cure for slavery, suggesting that slaves should be given the vote, a new president should be elected, and the North should speak out against the "spoiled child" of the South.

After passage of the Fugitive Slave Act of 1850, which required cooperation from law enforcement officials to capture refugee slaves even in free states, Brown moved to England for safety, as he had become a known public figure. He toured Britain with his antislavery panorama for the next ten years, performing several hundred times a year. To earn a living, Brown also entered the British show circuit for 25 years, until 1875, after leaving the abolitionist circuit following the start of the American Civil War.

In 1857, as Cutter documented in her book, The Illustrated Slave (2017), Brown acted in several plays written expressly for him by a British playwright – E.G. Burton – but his acting career appears to have been short-lived. In the 1860s, he began performing as a magician with acts as a mesmerist and conjuror, under the show names of "Prof. H. Box Brown" and the "African Prince".

While in England in 1855, Brown married Jane Floyd, a White Cornish tin worker's daughter, and began a new family. In 1875, he returned with his new family to the U.S., with a group magic act. A later report documented the Brown Family Jubilee Singers.

=== Last years, possible return to England, and death ===
Brown returned to the US in 1875, and ultimately settled in Canada in the Toronto area, where he lived and worked for over a decade. Tax and housing records indicate that he still may have been performing in the last years of his life.

As the scholar Martha J. Cutter first documented in 2015, Henry Box Brown died in Toronto on June 15, 1897. The last known performance by Brown is a newspaper account of a performance with his daughter Annie and wife Jane in Brantford, Ontario, Canada, dated February 26, 1889.

Martha Cutter also recently (2022) found two possible performances by Box Brown in England in 1896, one of which was at the Varteg School in England:;

The Varteg Board School was close to overflowing on Thursday evening week, when one of the grandest of entertainments was given on behalf of Mr. George Selby. [. . .] The programme was as follows:—Pianoforte solo, Miss Jessie Pope; duet, Misses Esse Short and A. Brace; dialogue, “Mrs. Pert and her visitors,” by Nine friends; organ recital, Professor Box Brown; [. . .] The organ recital by Prof. Box Brown has left a marked impression on the minds and ears of the people.

This information is not definitive, however, because passenger records in this period of ships returning to Canada contain few specific details about their occupants beyond first and last name and gender.

If the performance by Brown at the Varteg school is valid, this would have been the last known performance by Brown, since he died just one year later.

== Legacy ==
Samuel Alexander Smith attempted to ship more enslaved people from Richmond to liberty in Philadelphia, but was discovered and arrested. As for James C. A. Smith, he too was arrested for attempting another shipment of slaves.

- The Resurrection of Henry Box Brown at Philadelphia, a lithograph by Samuel Rowse, depicted Henry Brown emerging from the shipping box into freedom in Philadelphia. The lithograph was published to help raise funds to produce Brown's anti-slavery panorama. One of three known originals is preserved in the collection of the Virginia Historical Society in Richmond.
- A monument to Henry "Box" Brown is located along the Canal Walk in downtown Richmond, Virginia; it is a metal reproduction of the box in which Brown escaped.
- At Aquia Landing, on the Potomac River in Stafford Co., Virginia, and the 19th-century rail head from Richmond, there is a marker about the journey of Brown. At Aquia, the crate would have been transferred from a railroad car to a steamboat, then on to Washington, where the shipping process would be reversed.
- In 2012, Louisa County set a historical marker honoring Henry Box Brown and his escape from slavery.
- Ellen Levine wrote a children's picture book entitled Henry's Freedom Box (2007) based upon Brown's life. It was illustrated by Kadir Nelson and was awarded the Caldecott Honor.
- Tony Kushner wrote a play entitled Henry Box Brown, which premiered in 2010.
- Doug Peterson wrote a historical novel based on Henry Brown called The Disappearing Man (2011).
- Sally M. Walker wrote a children's book, Freedom Song: The Story of Henry "Box" Brown (2012), illustrated by Sean Qualls.
- Brown is the subject of a 2012 film, Box Brown, by director Rob Underhill.
- Playwright Mike Wiley wrote a one-man show about the life of Henry Box Brown entitled One Noble Journey.
- In 2014, Illustrator and historian Joel Christian Gill published a comic novel called Strange Fruit, Volume I: Uncelebrated Narratives from Black History, which included Brown's story.
- On the song "Diasporal Histories" by Professor A.L.I. released on the XFactor album in 2015, he interweaves the slave narratives of Henry "Box" Brown, Solomon Northup, Frederick Douglass, Harriet Tubman and the fictionalized narrative of Eliza who escapes slavery through an icy river. He says of Brown, "Henry Brown, boxed himself up to Boston! (a reference to the north)".
- Brown is the subject of a sequence of poems in Olio (2016) by Tyehimba Jess. The poems are adapted from John Berryman's The Dream Songs.
- Brown and his story is featured on the 2019 Kevin Hart Netflix Original “Kevin Hart’s Guide To Black History”.
- Brown was portrayed by Ade Otukoya in the Dickinson episode "Forbidden Fruit a Flavor Has."
- Jarrett King wrote a play entitled Box, which premiered on June 23, 2023, at Penfold Theatre in Austin Texas.
- As part of Black History Month celebrations, a Lane in Toronto was named after Brown on February 1, 2024 . “Henry Box Brown Lane” is situated in the Corktown area of Toronto between Bright Street and St. Paul Street.
- He is portrayed in Sanctuary Road by composer Paul Moravec and librettist Mark Campbell as an oratorio and opera. Sanctuary Road is based on the writings of abolitionist William Still and is based on the astonishing stories to be found in his book, titled The Underground Railroad, which is a documentation of the network of secret routes and safe houses used by African American slaves to escape into free states and Canada during the early- to mid-1800s. The oratorio premiered at Carnegie Hall in May, 2018. An opera version of Sanctuary Road premiered in Raleigh, North Carolina, in March 2022. A recording is available. A video of the opera can be viewed here.

Psalm

Song (modeled after Psalm 40), sung by Mr. Brown on being removed from the Box:

I waited patiently for the Lord
And he, in kindness to me, heard my calling
And he hath put a new song into my mouth
Even thanksgiving — even thanksgiving
Unto our God!

Blessed-blessed is the man
That has set his hope, his hope in the Lord!
O Lord! my God! great, great is the wondrous work
Which thou hast done!

If I should declare them — and speak of them
They would be more than I am able to express.
I have not kept back thy love, and kindness, and truth,
From the great congregation!

Withdraw not thou thy mercies from me,
Let thy love, and kindness, and thy truth, always preserve me
Let all those that seek thee be joyful and glad!
Be joyful and glad!

And let such as love thy salvation
Say always — say always
The Lord be praised!
The Lord be praised!

== See also ==
- Ellen Craft
- Abolitionism in the United States
- Fugitive slaves in the United States
- Fugitive slave laws in the United States
- List of slaves
- Slavery in the United States

== Bibliography ==
- Brown, Henry Box (1851). Narrative of the Life of Henry Box Brown, Written by Himself. Manchester: Lee & Glynn.
- Chater, Kathleen Untold Histories: Black People in England and Wales During the Period of the British Slave Trade, c. 1660-1807 Manchester: Manchester University Press, 2010.
- Chater, Kathleen Henry Box Brown: From Slavery to Show Business McFarland & Company, Inc, Jefferson, NC, 2020.
- Cutter, Martha J. The Many Resurrections of Henry Box Brown. University of Pennsylvania Press, 2022.
- Cutter, Martha J. (2015). "Will the Real Henry 'Box' Brown Please Stand Up?". Commonplace. 16 (1).
- Ernest, John, ed. (2008). Narrative of the Life of Henry Box Brown, Written by Himself. University of North Carolina Press. ISBN 978-1-4696-0500-5.
- Robbins, Hollis (2009). "Fugitive Mail: The Deliverance of Henry 'Box' Brown and Antebellum Postal Politics". American Studies. 50 (1/2): 6. doi:10.1353/ams.2011.0045. S2CID 142902898.
- Ruggles, Jeffrey (2003). The Unboxing of Henry Brown. Library of Virginia. ISBN 9780884902003.
- Spencer, Suzette. "Henry Box Brown (1815 or 1816–1897)".
- Stearns, Charles (1849). Narrative of Henry Box Brown, Who Escaped from Slavery Enclosed in a Box Three Feet Long, Two Wide, and Two and a Half High. Written from a Statement of Facts Made by Himself. With Remarks upon the Remedy for Slavery. Boston: Brown & Stearns.
