= John McSorley =

British javelin thrower and shot putter (born 1941)

Personal information
- Nationality: British (English)
- Born: 18 September 1941 (age 84) Staines-upon-Thames, England

Sport
- Sport: Athletics
- Event: javelin throw
- Club: Thames Valley Harriers
Medal record
Athletics
Representing England
British Empire & Commonwealth Games
Silver medal – second place	1970 Edinburgh	javelin

John Victor McSorley (born 18 September 1941) is a former British athlete who competed for England.

== Biography ==
McSorley became the British javelin throw champion after winning the British AAA Championships title at the 1962 AAA Championships in a new national record of 79.25 metres. He would podium five more times from 1965 to 1972 at the AAAs.

He represented England in the hammer, javelin and shot put at the 1962 British Empire and Commonwealth Games in Perth, Western Australia.

Eight years later, he won silver medal in the javelin at the 1970 British Commonwealth Games in Edinburgh, Scotland.

== Association with Reg Spiers ==
In 1964, fellow javelin thrower Reg Spiers, air-freighted himself from England to Australia to avoid paying for the flight. John McSorley created the box for his friend and when he did not hear from Spiers, he became worried and contacted the press about the incident. McSorely's wife and son later wrote a book discussing this incident.
