= Allen, Northern Samar =

Municipality in Northern Samar, Philippines

Allen La Granja
- Municipality
- Municipality of Allen
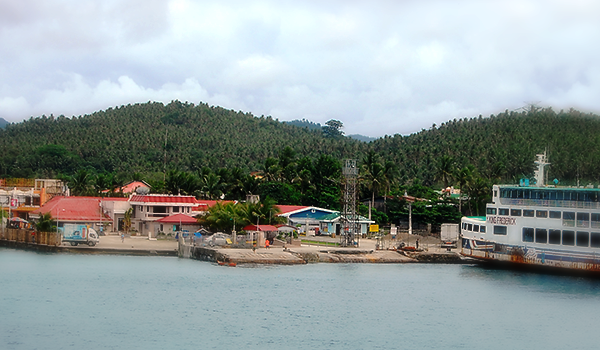
- Port of Allen

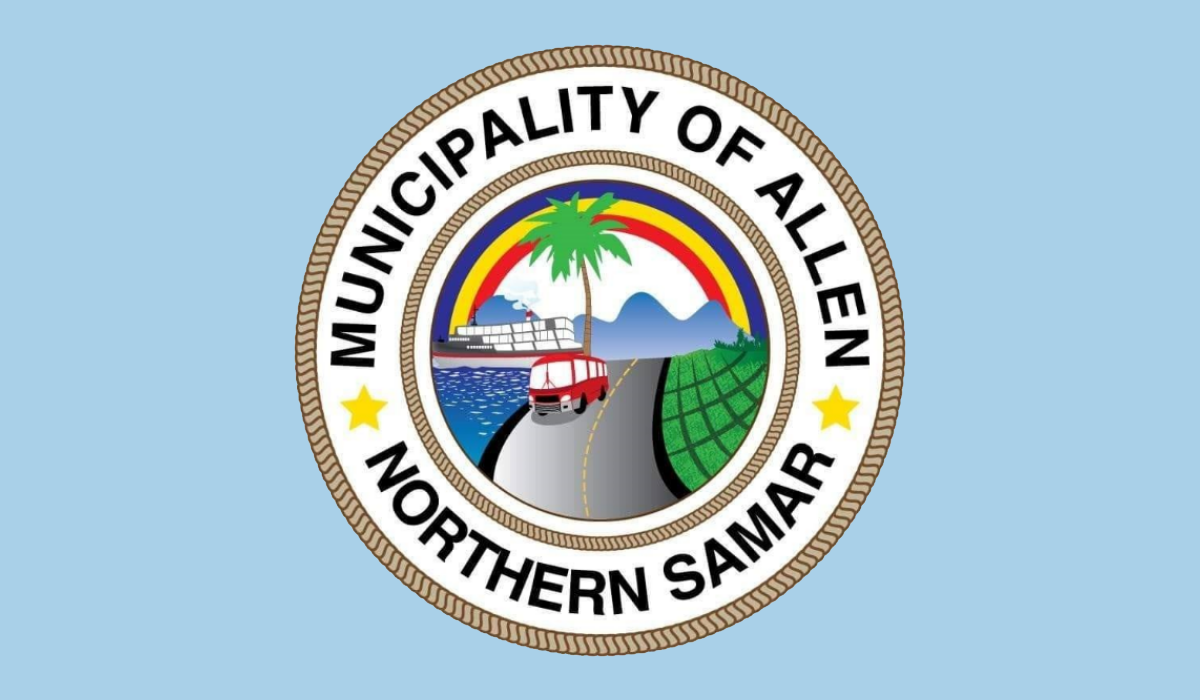
- Flag
- Nickname: Gateway to Eastern Visayas
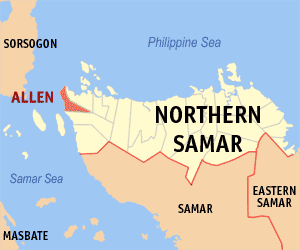
- Map of Northern Samar with Allen highlighted
- Interactive map of Allen
- Location within the Philippines
- Coordinates: 12°30′05″N 124°16′55″E
- Country: Philippines
- Region: Eastern Visayas
- Province: Northern Samar
- District: 1st district
- Founded: December 1, 1863
- Named for: Henry Tureman Allen
- Barangays: 20 (see Barangays)

Government
  - Type: Sangguniang Bayan
  - Mayor: Katrina Mae Enzon Suan
  - Vice Mayor: Christian Gatacilo Lao
  - Representative: Paul R. Daza
  - Councilors: List: • Christian G. Lao; • Marc Jason C. Aragon; • Manolito F. Gubat; • Francis V. Lao; • Mailyn R. Gatacillo; • Myrna U. Tan; • Glenn B. Cabahug; • Jude B. Diaz; DILG Masterlist of Officials
  - Electorate: 21,201 voters (2025)

Area
  - Total: 47.60 km^{2} (18.38 sq mi)
- Elevation: 37 m (121 ft)
- Highest elevation: 222 m (728 ft)
- Lowest elevation: 0 m (0 ft)

Population (2024 census)
  - Total: 26,527
  - Density: 557.3/km^{2} (1,443/sq mi)
  - Households: 6,045
- Demonym: Allenon

Economy
  - Income class: 4th municipal income class
  - Poverty incidence: 19.16% (2023)
  - Revenue: ₱ 182.7 million (2024)
  - Assets: ₱ 393.3 million (2024)
  - Expenditure: ₱ 180.9 million (2024)
  - Liabilities: ₱ 111 million (2024)

Service provider
  - Electricity: Northern Samar Electric Cooperative (NORSAMELCO)
- Time zone: UTC+8 (PST)
- ZIP code: 6405
- PSGC: 0804801000
- IDD : area code: +63 (0)55
- Native languages: Waray; Tagalog
- Website: www.allen-nsamar.gov.ph

Allen, officially the Municipality of Allen (Waray: Bungto han Allen; Tagalog: Bayan ng Allen), is a municipality in the province of Northern Samar, Philippines. According to the 2024 census, it has a population of 26,527 people.

It is located on the northwestern tip of the province, bordering the municipality of Victoria to the south, the municipality of Lavezares to the east, and the strategic San Bernardino Strait to both the north and west.

Allen is an important port for inter-island transport, specifically between the island of Samar and the island of Luzon.

== Etymology ==
Before the Spanish colonisation of the Philippines, the original Malayan name of the town was Minapa-a. During the Spanish colonisation period, the name of the town was changed to La Granja. The name Allen was given by the Americans in honor of the American General Henry Tureman Allen, the military governor of the Visayas after the victory of the Americans over the Spaniards in the Spanish–American War. During the Japanese occupation, the town's name was changed to Tanaman, in accordance with Executive Order No. 110 signed in December 1942, to be "in line with the objective of the Greater East Asia War of eradicating all traces of Anglo-Saxon influence in East Asia."

== History ==
The area of present-day Allen was originally populated by natives of Malay stock from the western and central portions of the island of Samar, particularly Catbalogan and Calbayog. Successive migrations to Allen from other islands that are near Allen were characterised by several waves. Malays from the neighbouring Bicol Peninsula in what is now Sorsogon crossed what is now the San Bernardino Strait using small sailing barges, trading with the locals before settling in, and inter-marrying with the local Malays many years after. Simultaneously, Malays of southern stock from Bohol through the islands of Capul and San Antonio crossed the strait and settled in the area.

The heavy waves of migration from Bicol to Allen in Samar in the course of the centuries is attested by the fact that almost 70% of the peoples of Allen trace their ancestries to the families in Bicol, from the province of Sorsogon.

The first recorded persons to have their names officially entered into a Spanish census in Allen were that of Cosmenia Cajandab and Mariano Cabacang; both surnames originated from the island of Capul.

Allen is also the hometown of Filipino sailing hero Florentino Das who holds the earliest record of a Trans-Pacific crossing from Hawaii to the Philippines. A memorial commemorating his achievement of 1956 is found in the town.

== Geography ==
=== Barangays ===
Allen is politically subdivided into 20 barangays. Each barangay consists of puroks and some have sitios.

- Alejandro Village (Santiago)
- Bonifacio
- Cabacungan
- Calarayan
- Frederic
- Guin-arawayan
- Imelda
- Jubasan
- Kinabranan Zone I (Poblacion)
- Kinabranan Zone II (Poblacion)
- Kinaguitman
- Lagundi
- Lipata
- Londres
- Lo-oc
- Sabang Zone I (Poblacion)
- Sabang Zone II (Poblacion)
- Santa Rita
- Tasvilla
- Victoria

=== Climate ===
Climate data for Allen, Northern Samar
Month	Jan	Feb	Mar	Apr	May	Jun	Jul	Aug	Sep	Oct	Nov	Dec	Year
Mean daily maximum °C (°F)	27 (81)	28 (82)	29 (84)	30 (86)	31 (88)	30 (86)	29 (84)	29 (84)	29 (84)	29 (84)	29 (84)	28 (82)	29 (84)
Mean daily minimum °C (°F)	22 (72)	22 (72)	22 (72)	22 (72)	24 (75)	24 (75)	24 (75)	24 (75)	24 (75)	24 (75)	23 (73)	23 (73)	23 (74)
Average precipitation mm (inches)	84 (3.3)	59 (2.3)	58 (2.3)	55 (2.2)	93 (3.7)	133 (5.2)	149 (5.9)	125 (4.9)	155 (6.1)	165 (6.5)	140 (5.5)	136 (5.4)	1,352 (53.3)
Average rainy days	18.1	13.6	15.8	16.1	21.7	25.5	26.6	25.1	24.8	25.8	22.7	20.1	255.9
Source: Meteoblue

== Demographics ==
Population census of Allen
Year	Pop.	±% p.a.
1903	4,903	—
1918	8,497	+3.73%
1939	14,734	+2.66%
1948	20,760	+3.88%
1960	15,275	−2.52%
1970	13,474	−1.25%
1975	15,668	+3.07%
1980	15,166	−0.65%
1990	15,404	+0.16%
1995	17,972	+2.93%
2000	20,066	+2.39%
2007	22,334	+1.49%
2010	23,738	+2.24%
2015	25,469	+1.35%
2020	25,228	−0.20%
2024	26,527	+1.21%
Source: Philippine Statistics Authority

== Economy ==
Poverty incidence of Allen (%)

Source: Philippine Statistics Authority

== Infrastructure ==
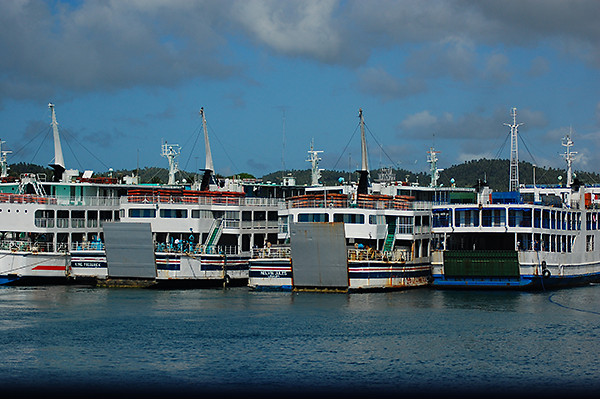
Roll-on/roll-off ferry boats at Allen

Allen serves as an important transit point, connecting Samar and other islands with Luzon. It is opposite the Luzon transit point in the municipality of Matnog, Sorsogon. The primary modes of transport are the inter-island bus route via the Maharlika Highway, and the ferry crossing the San Bernardino Strait.

=== Transportation ===
==== Ferry Service ====
Ferries cross the strategically important Strait of San Bernardino, transporting passengers and vehicles to and from Allen in Samar and Matnog in Luzon. Travel time ranges between one hour to 2 hours depending on the speed of the ferry.

==== Bus ====
Buses from the various provinces of the Visayas and Mindanao bound for various destinations in Luzon pass through Allen, riding the ferry services of Allen to Matnog, and vice versa.

The bus terminals servicing the numerous passengers crossing the San Bernardino Strait are located at the piers and ports that are operational in Allen. Booking offices for buses that ply the route are also located at these terminals.

=== Accommodations ===
A number of relatively low-priced hotels and inns within the town serve most of the transit passengers for overnight stay, specially during bad weather when some stranded passengers take refuge in the small hotels and inns. During bad weather conditions, ferries cannot cross the San Bernardino Strait due to high waves.

== See also ==
- List of renamed cities and municipalities in the Philippines
