= Samuel W. Rowse =

American illustrator, lithographer and painter

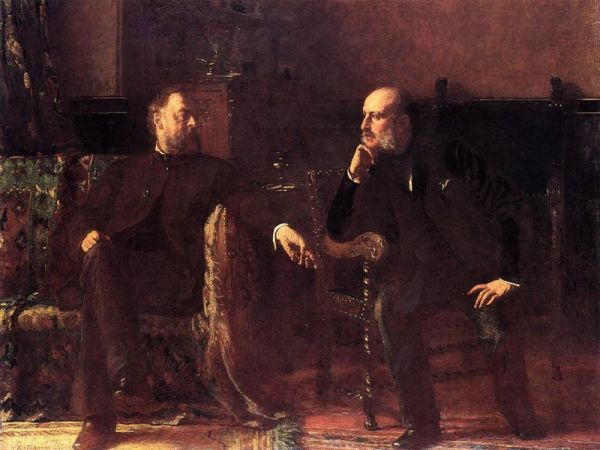
Eastman Johnson, The Funding Bill also known as Portrait of Two Men, 1881. Depicts Robert W. Rutherford and Samuel W. Rowse (right).

Samuel Worcester Rowse (January 29, 1822 – May 24, 1901) was an American illustrator, lithographer, and painter. He was most famous for his drawings of Ralph Waldo Emerson and Henry David Thoreau. Rowse is also well known for his lithograph, The Resurrection of Henry Box Brown at Philadelphia.

== Early life ==
Rowse was born in Bath, Maine on January 29, 1822. He worked in Maine as an engraver.

== Works ==
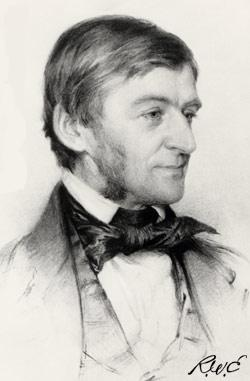
Samuel Rowse, Ralph Waldo Emerson

In 1852, Rowse worked for a lithographer and then opened a studio in Boston, Massachusetts, due to the demand for his crayon (pastel) and charcoal portraits. He developed a reputation for his drawings of people in the news. Rowse boarded with the family of Ralph Waldo Emerson in the summer of 1854, and while there sketched Henry David Thoreau, which was considered to be a good likeness by Sophia Thoreau. The drawing, which had hung in the Thoreau house, was donated to the Concord Free Public Library by Amos Bronson Alcott after he purchased the house in 1877. In June 1858, Rowse made a sketch of Emerson, considered by William James Stillman to be "the most masterly" depiction of him. The drawing is displayed in Emerson'a former home in Concord. Rowse is best known for these images.

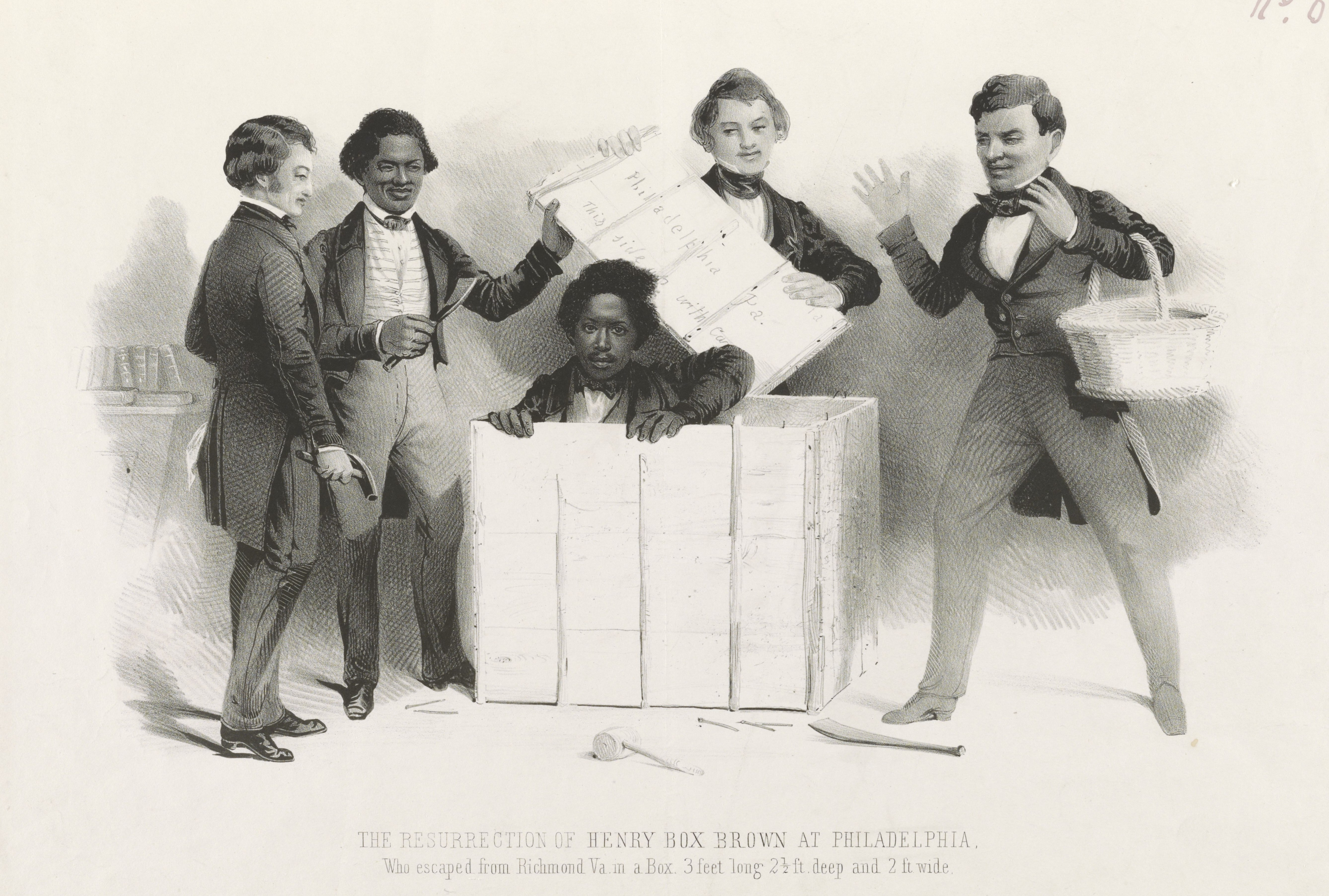
Samuel Rowse, The Resurrection of Henry Box Brown at Philadelphia, lithograph, c. 1850s

Copies of his lithograph of The Resurrection of Henry Box Brown at Philadelphia were used by anti-slavery activists prior to and during the American Civil War (1861–1865) to raise funds for the Underground Railroad and other anti-slavery campaigns. Henry Box Brown was a slave who escaped from Richmond, Virginia in 1849 by having himself shipped overland express to Philadelphia, Pennsylvania in a small crate, delivered to Passmore Williamson, Reverend James Miller McKim, and other members of the Pennsylvania Anti-Slavery Society. His journey took 27 hours and was considered a miracle of the improved private mail system.

In 1864 Rowse joined the Saturday Club, of which Emerson was a member. Rowse went to London in 1872 with mathematician and philosopher Chauncey Wright. He met John Ruskin and American cultural critic, Charles Eliot Norton while there. He moved to New York City in 1880. Rowse is depicted in his friend, Eastman Johnson's painting of two men, The Funding Bill, which is in the Metropolitan Museum of Art's collection.

He was commissioned to make portraits of James Russell Lowell, Nathaniel Hawthorne, Henry Wadsworth Longfellow. and Frances Appleton Longfellow (1859), which is in the Longfellow Trust Collection. Generally the portraits were drawings in black and white, and in crayon. Other subjects were the family of Frederic Edwin Church, Arthur Hugh Clough and Howard Dwight. Annie Adams Fields, wife of Boston publisher James T. Fields, sat for a black crayon drawing by Rowse and noted the artist was "eccentric but true and interesting".

He made portraits of children, which exhibited at the galleries of M. Knoedler & Co. in January, 1902. A book was published that year entitled Ideal Children's Heads in Crayon and Oil.

Rowse died in Morristown, New Jersey on May 24, 1901.
