= Brian Robson =

Man who mailed himself home in a crate

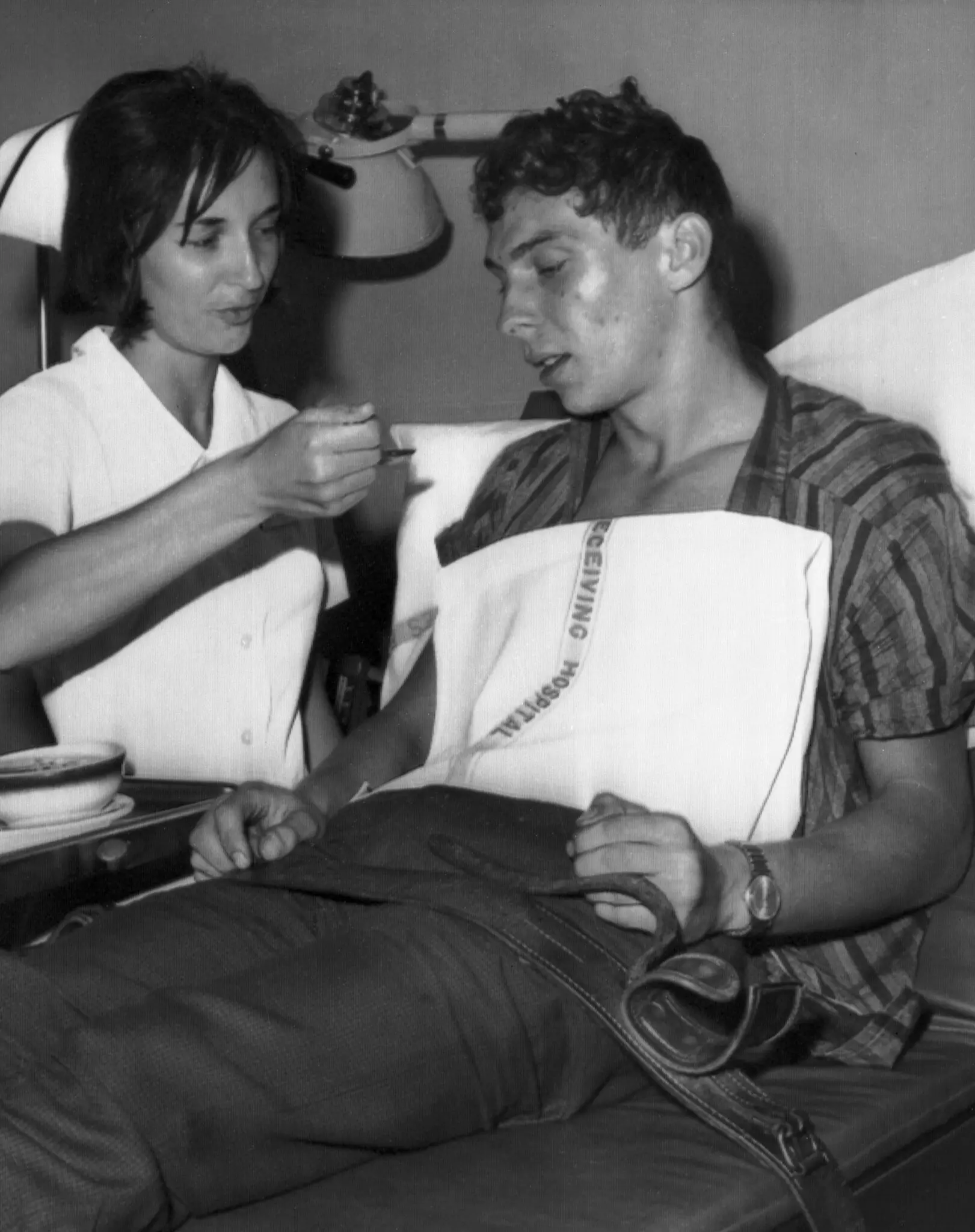
A nurse feeds Robson after he arrived in Los Angeles

Brian Robson (born June 1945) is notable for having mailed himself in a crate from Melbourne, Australia to Los Angeles, California in the mid-1960s.

== Travel ==
In 1965, Robson was in Australia and didn't have sufficient funds to travel back home to Cardiff, Wales. Inspired by the story of Reg Spiers, an Olympic javelin thrower who had performed a similar feat, Robson had his friends seal him in a crate that measured 36 × 30 × 38 inches and send him by post back to London. Supplies in the crate included: a hammer, a suitcase, a pillow, a litre of water, a flashlight, a book of Beatles songs, and an empty bottle.

Robson spent 92 hours in the crate before officials intercepted him in Los Angeles, USA. He was then deported to London.

Robson's plan had been to be shipped directly to London on a 36-hour Qantas flight from Sydney, but the connecting flight was full, and so the crate was left upside down for 22 hours on the tarmac until it was shipped freight by Pan Am to Los Angeles before being transferred on to London. Because the areas where the crate had been stored were not properly heated and the crate had at times been kept upside down, Robson suffered greatly on his four-day journey, at times even slipping in and out of consciousness. It took him several days to recover in a hospital in Los Angeles.

Robson settled down in his native Wales, retiring at the age of 60. In 2021, he wrote a book about his experience called The Crate Escape.
