= Reg Spiers =

Australian javelin thrower (born 1941)

- Born: Reginald James Spiers; 14 December 1941 (age 84); Adelaide, Australia
- Occupations: Athlete, smuggler
- Status: Released
- Convictions: Possession of heroin and hashish (2 June 1987)
- Penalty: Death sentence prior to successful appeal

Reginald James "Reg" Spiers (born 14 December 1941) is an Australian former athlete who competed in the javelin throw at the 1962 Commonwealth Games, before his later conviction on drug smuggling charges. He is best known for successfully posting himself in a box from England to Australia to avoid paying for a plane ticket.

== Athletic career ==
Born in Adelaide, South Australia, Spiers, who grew to be over two metres tall and strongly built, took up javelin and became one of the leading javelin throwers in Australia while still a teenager, placing third in the 1960/61 Australian Track and Field Championships and second in 1961/62.

His results led to his qualification for the 1962 Commonwealth Games in Perth, Western Australia, where he came fifth with a best throw of 69.70 metres.

Spiers continued to compete but his performances during the 1963/64 Australian summer were not enough to gain admission to the 1964 Australian Olympic team so Spiers travelled to England in an attempt to qualify during the English summer. Unsuccessful, desperate to get back home in time for his daughter's birthday and penniless by the end of the season, Spiers enlisted British athlete John McSorley to help him build a man-sized wooden box, in which he then air-freighted himself back to Australia. Referred to as having "heroic - albeit borderline delusional gumption" for his actions, Spiers eventually made it to Perth, although nearly dehydrating on the runway in Mumbai.

Spiers's 1964 journey as airfreight from London to Australia was highly publicised after McSorley became concerned about his friend's welfare and contacted sports correspondent James Coote from The Telegraph newspaper in London. Following his six-year disappearance after skipping bail from Adelaide with his girlfriend in 1981, Spiers declined a television interview with Channel 9 in 1988. Scant details had survived about Spiers's sixty-three-hour stowaway flight, and little was known about his time on the run, until he endorsed a book by McSorley's wife and son.

After a brief retirement, Spiers returned to competitive athletics in the 1966/67 season, winning the national javelin championship with a throw of 73.77 metres. The next season, Spiers recorded his best ever throw of 74.45 metres but only finished third nationally. Spiers continued to compete until 1980/81, again winning the national javelin throw in 1976/77 with a throw of 73.68 metres.

== Post-athletic career ==
Following his retirement from athletics, Spiers became involved in drug smuggling and was arrested by the Australian Federal Police and charged in the Adelaide Courts for conspiracy to import A$1.2 million of cocaine and cannabis resin into Australia in 1980. Spiers pleaded guilty and was sentenced to ten years, but disappeared from Adelaide in October 1981.

Spiers next appeared in India, where he was arrested on 5 January 1982 on charges of being a drug courier, which led to questions being asked in the Australian parliament about his passport.

After escaping from India, Spiers was next arrested at Bandaranaike Airport in Sri Lanka on 1 December 1984 while travelling on a French passport under the name Patrick Claude Albert Ledoux. Sri Lankan Customs officials found 41 packets of drugs, including 1 kg (2.2 lb) of heroin, hidden in a cassette recorder in Spiers's possession. On 2 June 1987, Spiers was found guilty of four counts of possessing heroin and one count of possessing hashish and sentenced to death. A successful appeal earned Spiers a reprieve, but he was forced to serve a five-year prison term in Adelaide.

In 2011, Spiers's daughter Jane was convicted on counts of manufacturing a controlled drug, and one count of doing so for sale. Jane Spiers was jailed for six years, with a three-year non-parole period.

In 2014, a book was released Out Of The Box: The Highs and Lows of a Champion Smuggler, published by Roaring Forties Press in the US. The book was endorsed by Spiers and covers details of his journey from England to Australia as airfreight, as well as his years on the run as a fugitive that led to death row.
