= AREC =

AREC may refer to:

- Amateur Radio Emergency Communications service in New Zealand
- American Railway Express Company Garage in Philadelphia, Pennsylvania, U.S.
- Avalanche Recordings catalogue numbers
- Agricultural Research and Education Center of the American University of Beirut
- Affiliated Renewable Energy Center of:
  - University of Eastern Philippines
  - Central Philippine University
- Associacao dos Ressortissants do Enclave de Cabinda, a Cabinda War organisation
- American River Electric Company power house in Swansboro, California
- AREC, type of Field hockey stick
