= SMHS =

SMHS is a four-letter abbreviation that may refer to:

- San Marin High School
- San Marino High School
- South Miami High School
- San Marcos High School (disambiguation), multiple schools
- San Mateo High School
- Santa Margarita Catholic High School (also abbreviated SMCHS)
- Santa Maria High School
- Santa Monica High School
- Scecina Memorial High School
- Shadow Mountain High School
- Smoky Mountain High School
- South Medford High School
- South Mecklenburg High School
- South Milwaukee High School
- South Mountain High School
- Spruce Mountain High School
- St. Mark Catholic High School (Ottawa)
- Saint Michael Academy (Catarman)
- St. Michael's High School (New Mexico, USA)
- St. Mary's High School (Calgary)
- Stone Mountain High School
- Sunrise Mountain High School
- Spring Mills High School
- SMHS Hospital at Srinagar
