= Catarman, Northern Samar =

Capital of Northern Samar, Philippines

Catarman
- Municipality
- Municipality of Catarman
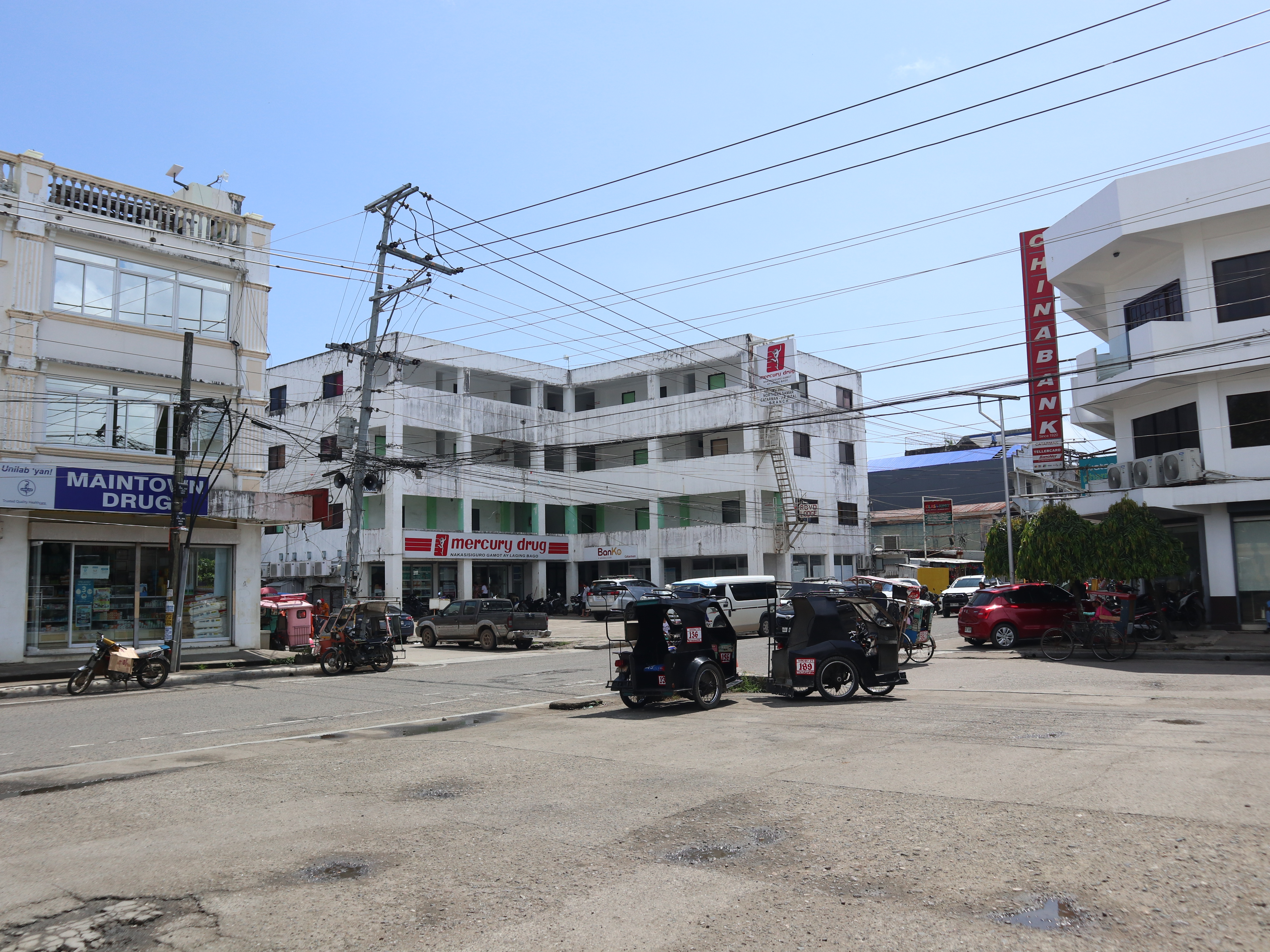
- Catarman Town Proper

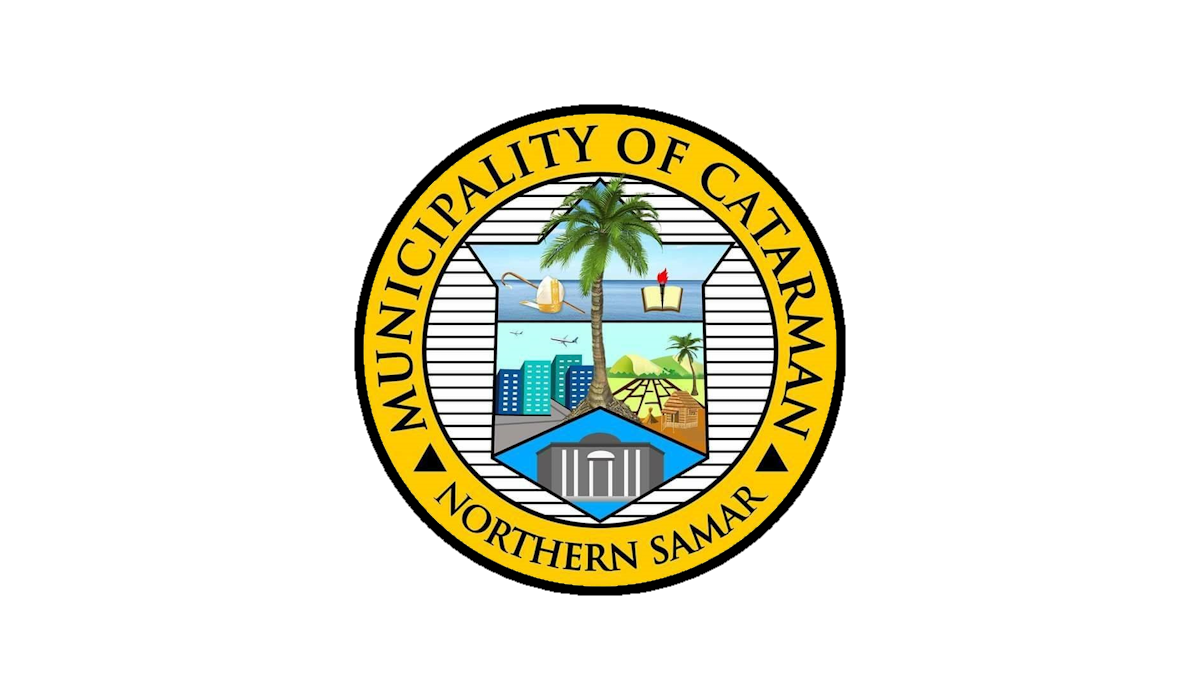
- Flag Seal

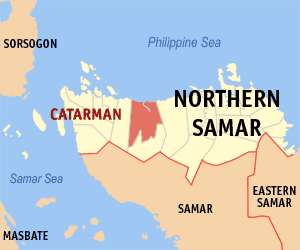
- Map of Northern Samar with Catarman highlighted
- Interactive map of Catarman
- Location within the Philippines
- Coordinates: 12°29′58″N 124°37′58″E
- Country: Philippines
- Region: Eastern Visayas
- Province: Northern Samar
- District: 1st district
- Barangays: 55 (see Barangays)

Government
  - Type: Sangguniang Bayan
  - Mayor: Dianne E. Rosales
  - Vice Mayor: Francisco C. Rosales Jr.
  - Representative: Niko Raul S. Daza
  - Councilors: List: • Nerissa O. Daclag; • Sandy C. Balite; • Fernando G. Carpio; • Maricor G. Mendador; • Jennifer D. Salutan; • Julian G. Custorio; • Ernesto S. Patilan Jr.; • Ramon C. Tiberio DILG Masterlist of Officials
  - Electorate: 63,766 voters (2025)

Area
  - Total: 464.43 km^{2} (179.32 sq mi)
- Elevation: 15 m (49 ft)
- Highest elevation: 142 m (466 ft)
- Lowest elevation: −1 m (−3.3 ft)

Population (2024 census)
  - Total: 97,738
  - Density: 210.45/km^{2} (545.06/sq mi)
  - Households: 20,836
- Demonym: Catarmananon

Economy
  - Income class: 1st municipal income class
  - Poverty incidence: 24.44% (2023)
  - Revenue: ₱ 514.1 million (2024)
  - Assets: ₱ 1,661 million (2024)
  - Expenditure: ₱ 471.9 million (2024)
  - Liabilities: ₱ 514.9 million (2024)

Service provider
  - Electricity: Northern Samar Electric Cooperative (NORSAMELCO)
- Time zone: UTC+8 (PST)
- Zip Code: 6400
- PSGC: 0804805000
- IDD : area code: +63 (0)55
- Native languages: Waray; Tagalog
- Website: www.catarman-nsamar.gov.ph

Catarman, officially the Municipality of Catarman (Waray [Ninorte Samarnon]: Bungto san Catarman; Tagalog: Bayan ng Catarman), is a municipality and capital of the province of Northern Samar, Philippines. According to the 2024 census, it has a population of 97,738 people. It is the commercial, educational, financial, and political center of the province. It is the most populous municipality in Eastern Visayas.

== History ==
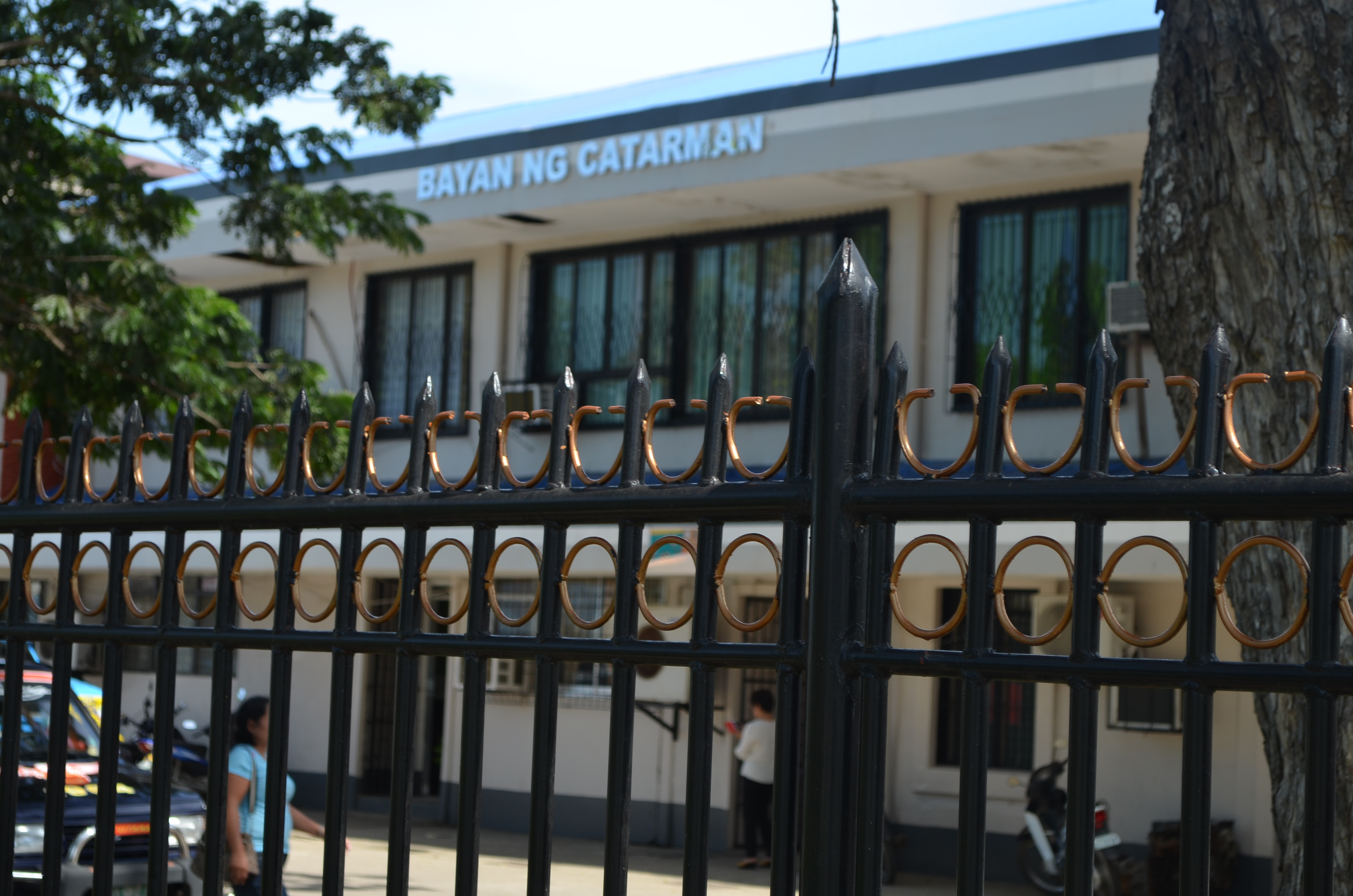
Catarman Municipal Hall

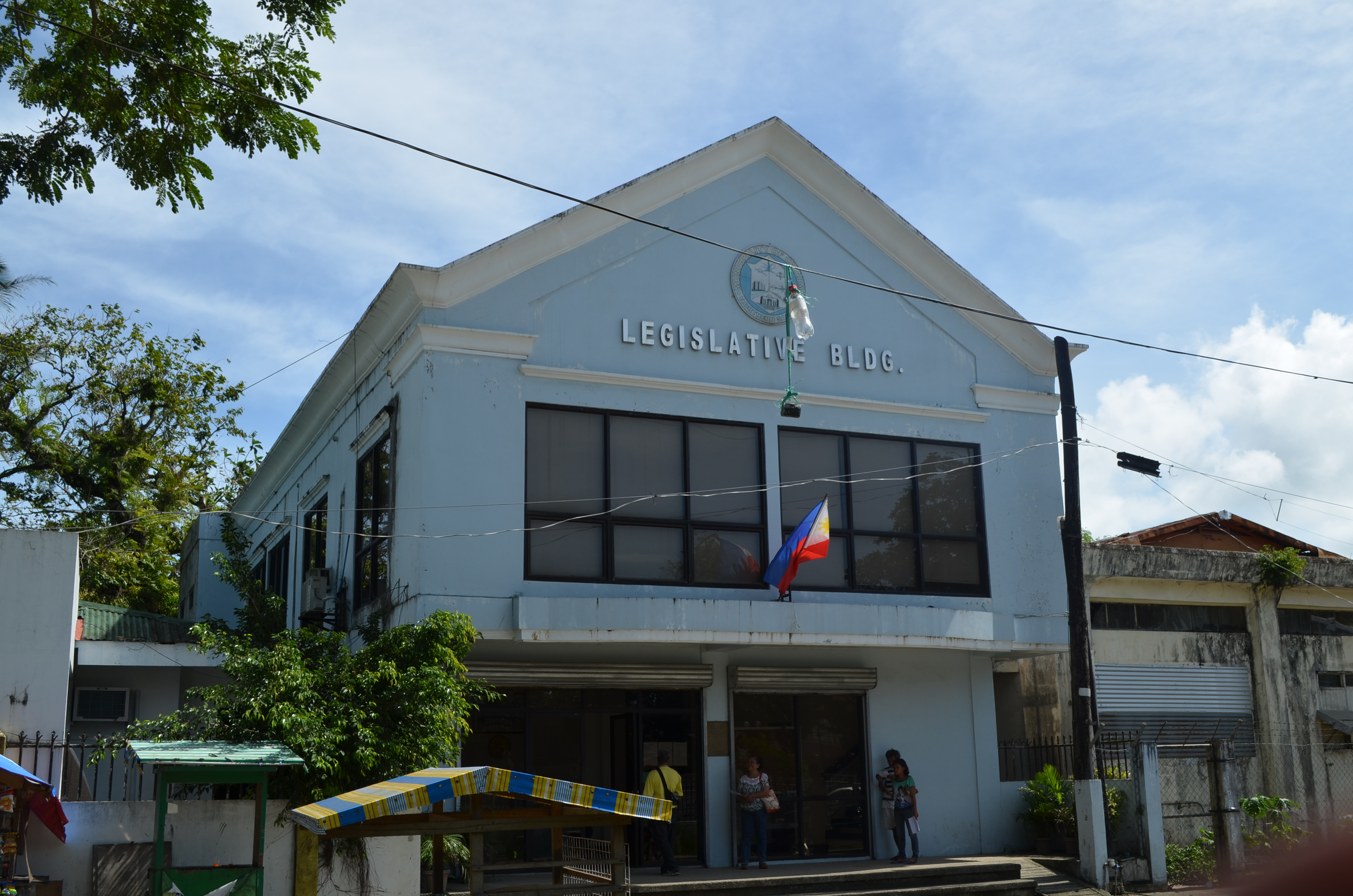
Catarman Legislative Building

Before the coming of the Spaniards, Catarman (also known as Calatman or Cataruman) was a settlement by the mouth of the river of the same name in the region called Ibabao. The Spanish Conquistadors applied the term Ibabao to the northern part of Samar island when it established its civil government. The similarities in the vocabularies and pronunciation of the dialects of these areas traces them to a common root as a people.

The town was one of the 13 villages and settlements and adopted as pueblos by the Spaniards in Samar Island and was one of the settlements in the northern parts of the island. The pueblo was named Calatman and was one of the pueblos in the Visayan islands, then collectively referred to as Islas de Pintados [Island of the Painted Ones].

In 1974, Catarman was made the center of the episcopal see of the then newly established Roman Catholic Diocese of Catarman comprising the Northern Samar province, with the Our Lady of the Annunciation Parish Church as the designated cathedral.

== Geography ==
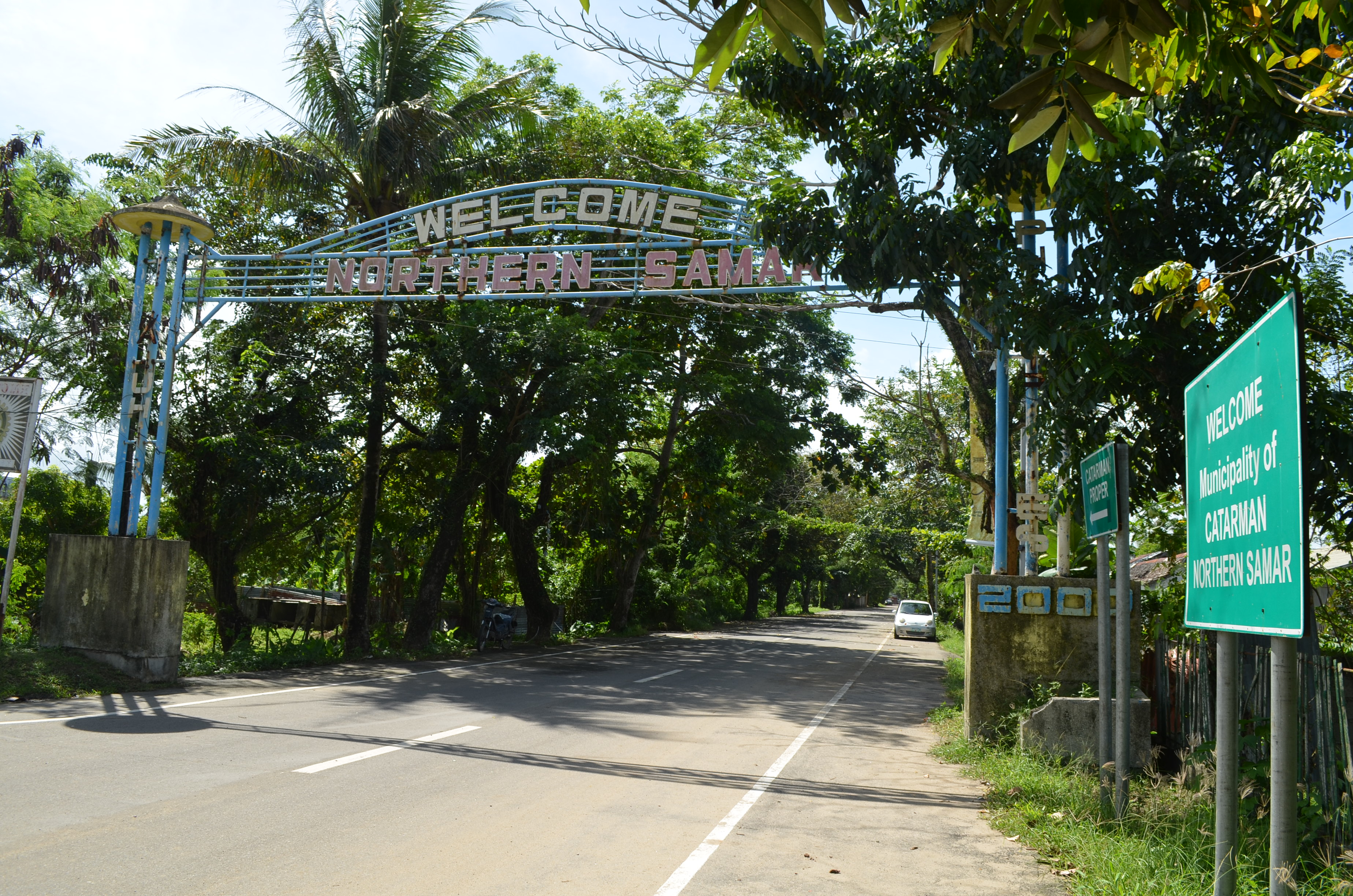
Welcome arch to Catarman

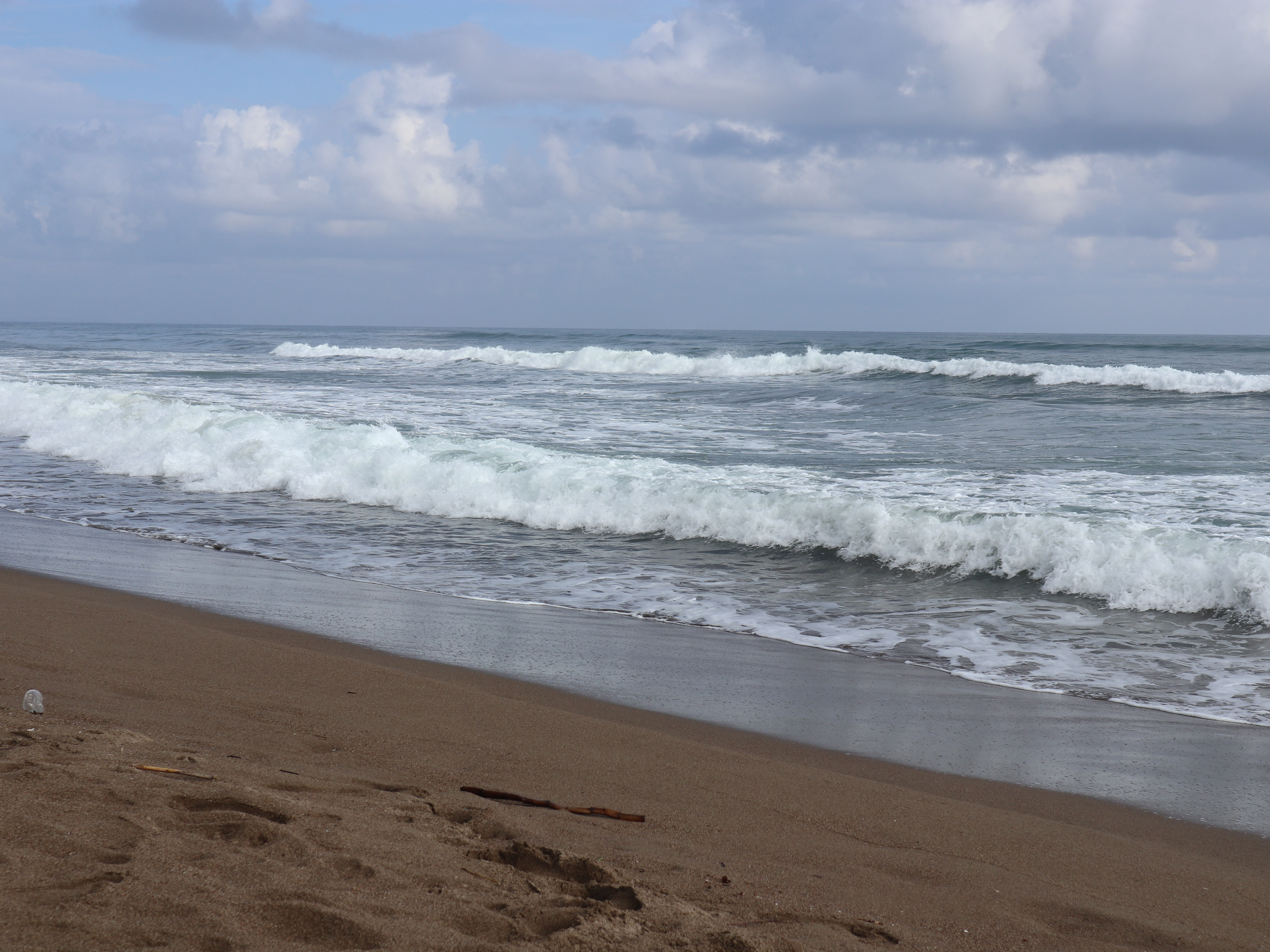
Dalakit Beach

Catarman lies on the northern part of Samar Island, bounded to the east by Mondragon, to the west by Bobon, to the south by Lope de Vega, to the southwest by Calbayog City, and to the north by the Philippine Sea.

On the Pacific coast are flat lowlands with the interior characterized by outlying low hills. Mount Puyao in Barangay Liberty is the highest peak in the area. The Catarman River, a major provincial river, divides the eastern and the western parts of the town. It is fed by the Paticua, Hibulwangan, Mahangna, Tura, and Danao creeks together with less prominent estuaries.

=== Barangays ===
Catarman is politically subdivided into 55 barangays. Each barangay consists of puroks and some have sitios.

- Acacia (pob.)
- Aguinaldo
- Airport Village (pob.)
- Bangkerohan
- Baybay (pob.)
- Bocsol
- Cabayhan
- Cag-abaca
- Cal-igang
- Calachuchi (pob.)
- Casoy (pob.)
- Cawayan
- Cervantes
- Cularima
- Daganas
- Dalakit
- Doña Pulqueria
- Galutan
- Gebalagnan
- Gibulwangan
- Guba
- Hinatad
- Imelda
- Ipil-ipil (pob.)
- Jose Abad Santos (pob.)
- Jose P. Rizal (pob.)
- Lapu-lapu (pob.)
- Liberty
- Libjo
- Mabini
- Mabolo (pob.)
- Macagtas
- Malvar
- McKinley
- Molave (pob.)
- Narra (pob.)
- New Rizal
- Old Rizal
- Paticua
- Polangi
- Quezon
- Salvacion
- Sampaguita (pob.)
- San Julian
- San Pascual
- Santol (pob.)
- Somoge
- Talisay (pob.)
- Tinowaran
- Trangue
- UEP Zone I
- UEP Zone II
- UEP Zone III
- Washington
- Yakal (pob.)

=== Climate ===
Climate data for Catarman, Northern Samar (1991–2020, extremes 1949–2020)
Month	Jan	Feb	Mar	Apr	May	Jun	Jul	Aug	Sep	Oct	Nov	Dec	Year
Record high °C (°F)	34.2 (93.6)	34.0 (93.2)	35.4 (95.7)	37.2 (99.0)	37.7 (99.9)	38.0 (100.4)	36.7 (98.1)	37.1 (98.8)	37.5 (99.5)	35.5 (95.9)	36.0 (96.8)	34.3 (93.7)	38.0 (100.4)
Mean daily maximum °C (°F)	29.3 (84.7)	29.9 (85.8)	30.7 (87.3)	32.0 (89.6)	33.1 (91.6)	32.9 (91.2)	32.3 (90.1)	32.8 (91.0)	32.6 (90.7)	31.6 (88.9)	30.8 (87.4)	29.9 (85.8)	31.5 (88.7)
Daily mean °C (°F)	26.0 (78.8)	26.2 (79.2)	26.7 (80.1)	27.6 (81.7)	28.5 (83.3)	28.4 (83.1)	28.1 (82.6)	28.5 (83.3)	28.2 (82.8)	27.6 (81.7)	27.1 (80.8)	26.6 (79.9)	27.5 (81.5)
Mean daily minimum °C (°F)	22.7 (72.9)	22.5 (72.5)	22.6 (72.7)	23.2 (73.8)	23.9 (75.0)	24.0 (75.2)	23.9 (75.0)	24.1 (75.4)	23.9 (75.0)	23.6 (74.5)	23.5 (74.3)	23.3 (73.9)	23.5 (74.3)
Record low °C (°F)	16.9 (62.4)	17.2 (63.0)	17.6 (63.7)	19.0 (66.2)	20.0 (68.0)	20.0 (68.0)	20.8 (69.4)	20.6 (69.1)	19.4 (66.9)	19.9 (67.8)	17.8 (64.0)	18.2 (64.8)	16.9 (62.4)
Average rainfall mm (inches)	520.1 (20.48)	310.5 (12.22)	312.4 (12.30)	152.5 (6.00)	162.9 (6.41)	217.3 (8.56)	221.9 (8.74)	167.7 (6.60)	205.8 (8.10)	331.9 (13.07)	457.8 (18.02)	689.9 (27.16)	3,750.7 (147.67)
Average rainy days (≥ 0.1 mm)	21	15	15	11	10	13	14	11	12	17	22	24	185
Average relative humidity (%)	89	87	86	84	83	84	85	83	84	86	88	89	86
Source: PAGASA

== Demographics ==
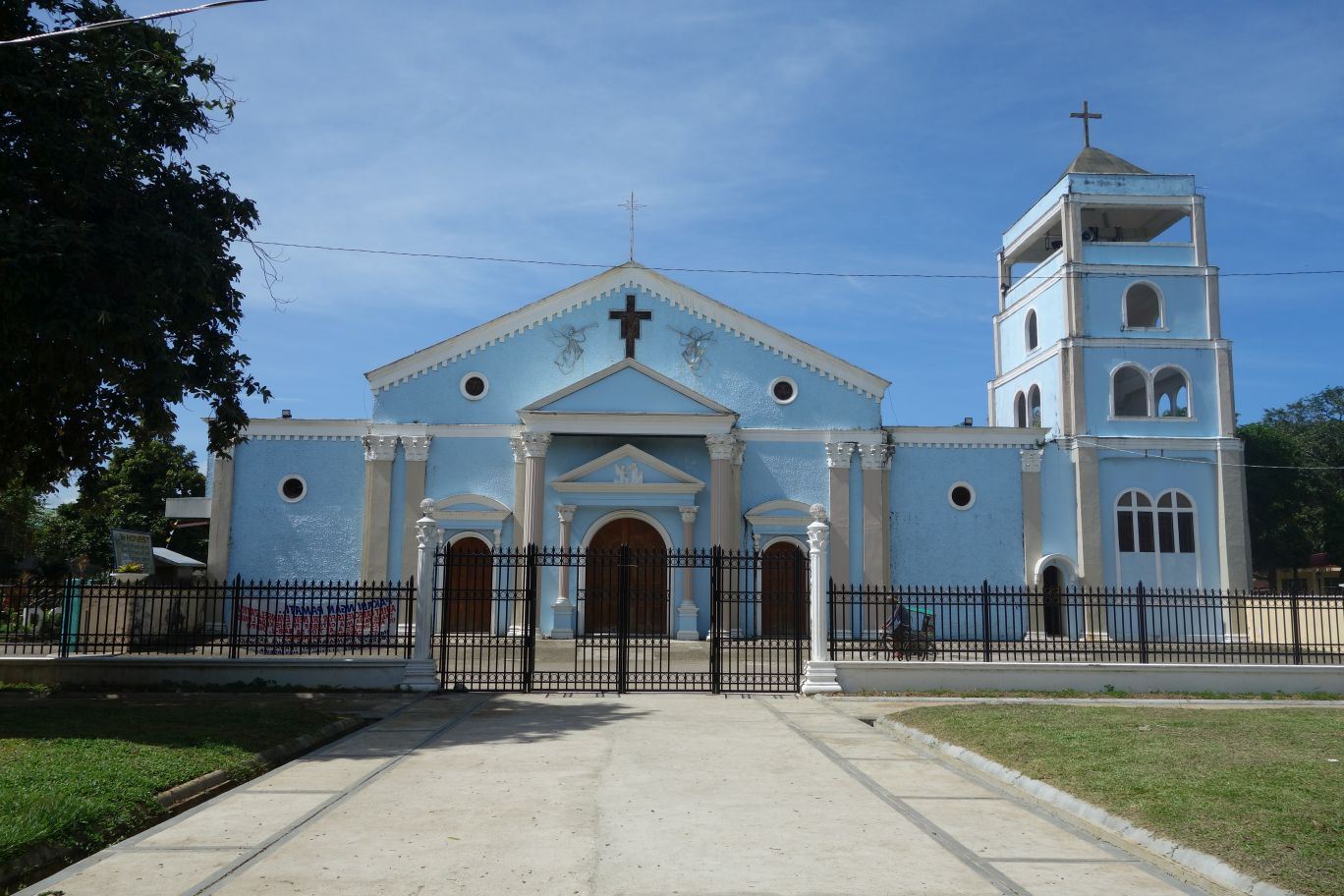
Catarman Cathedral

Population census of Catarman

Year	Pop.	±% p.a.
1903	9,994	—
1918	13,278	+1.91%
1939	21,007	+2.21%
1948	33,153	+5.20%
1960	39,434	+1.46%
1970	44,438	+1.20%

Year	Pop.	±% p.a.
1975	53,267	+3.70%
1980	59,021	+2.07%
1990	50,965	−1.46%
1995	61,705	+3.65%
2000	67,671	+2.00%
2007	81,067	+2.52%

Year	Pop.	±% p.a.
2010	84,833	+1.67%
2015	94,037	+1.98%
2020	97,879	+0.85%
2024	97,738	−0.03%

Source: Philippine Statistics Authority

== Economy ==
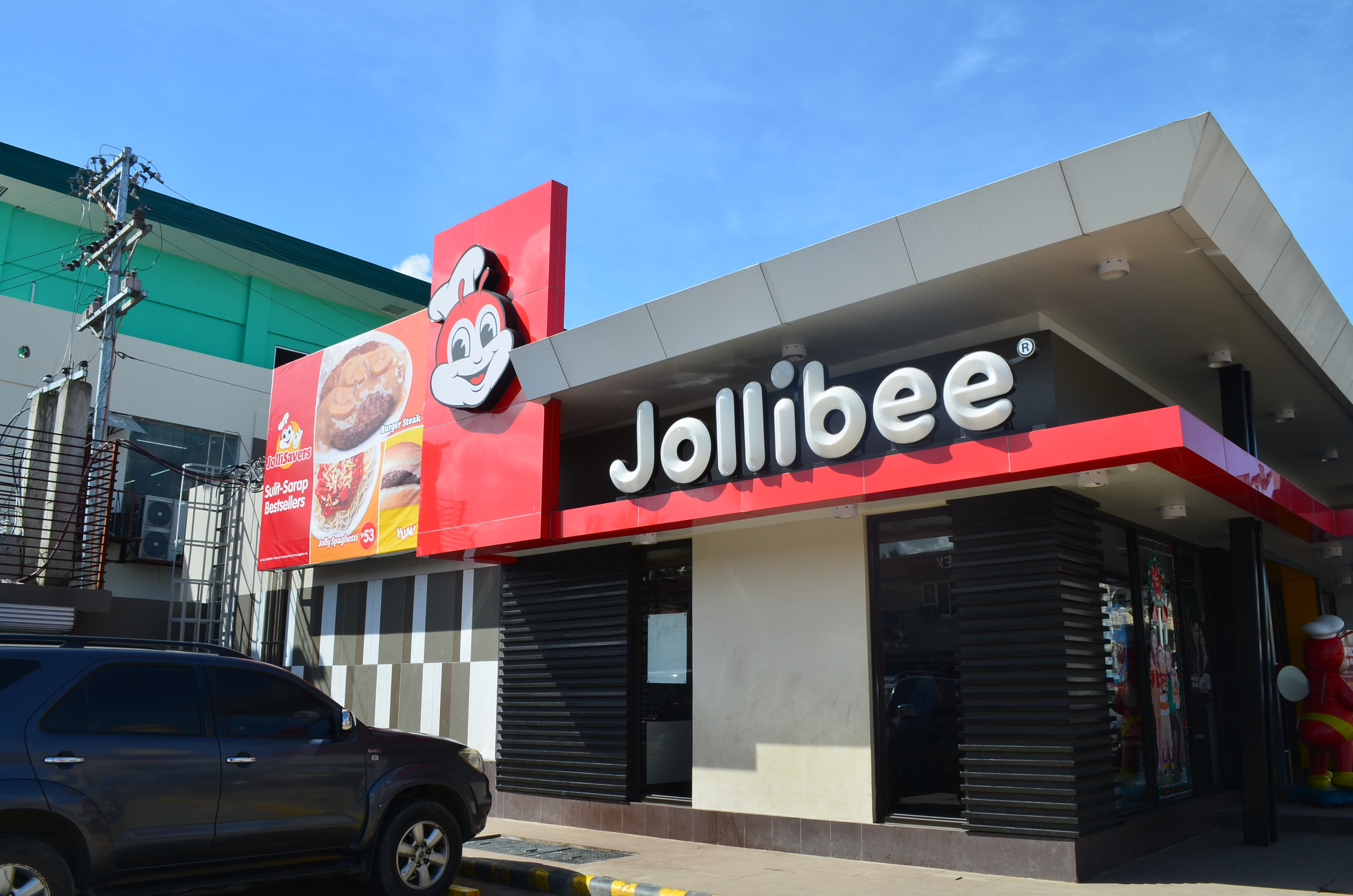
A Jollibee branch in Catarman

Poverty incidence of Catarman (%)

Source: Philippine Statistics Authority

== Transportation ==
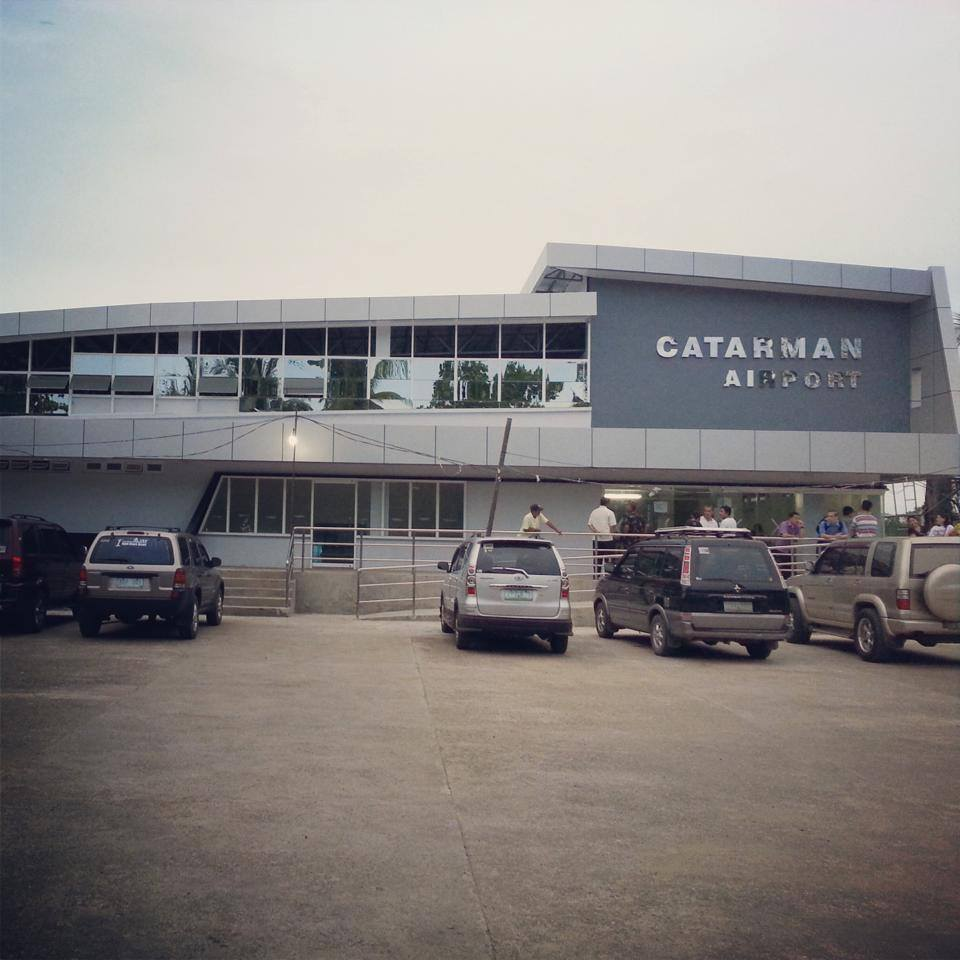
Catarman National Airport Terminal

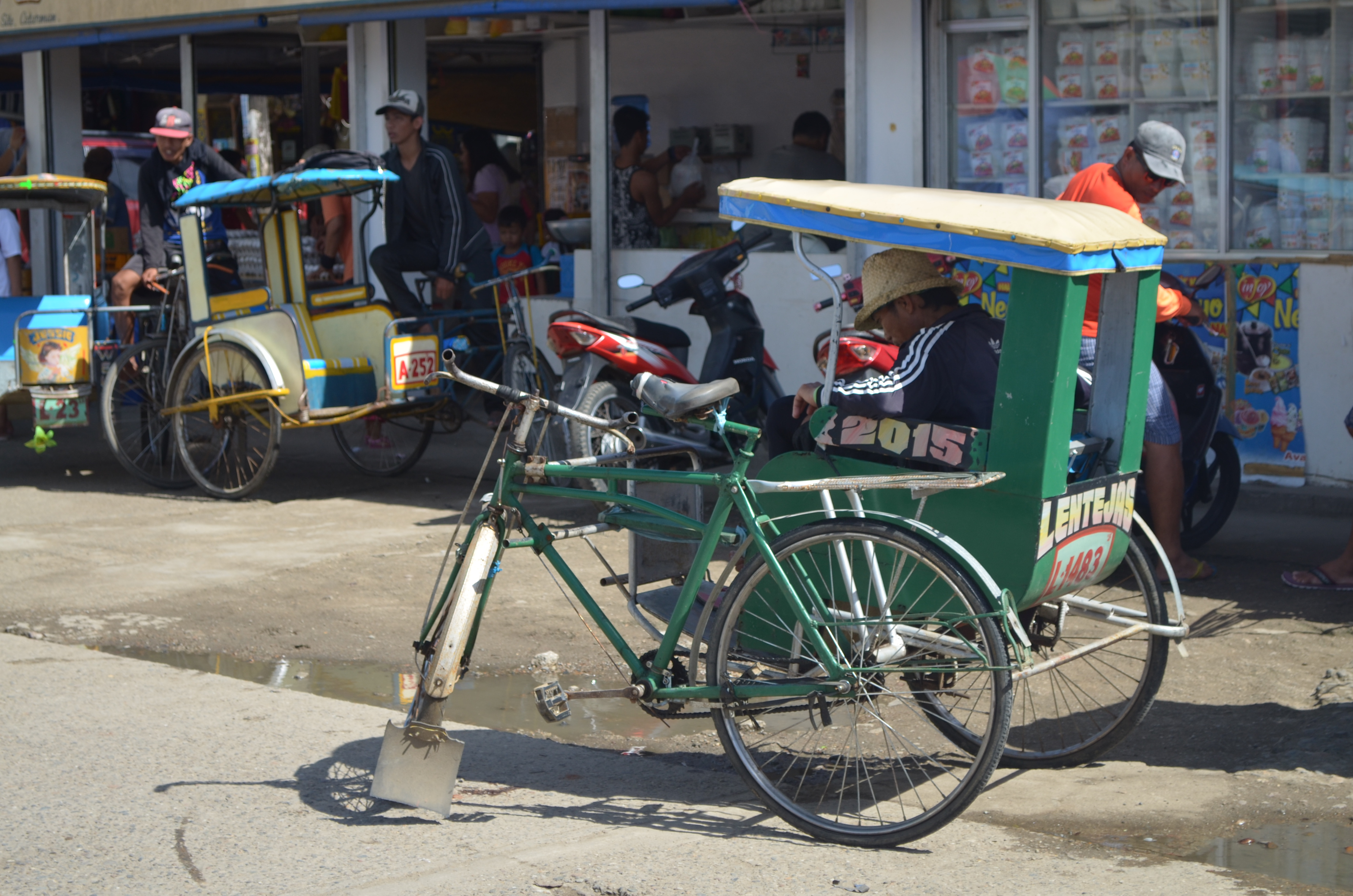
Pedicabs, one of the transportation modes in the town

PAL Express is the only airline operating through the Catarman National Airport, with flights between Manila and Catarman four times weekly and recently a 3x per week flight from Catarman to Cebu City. Flights are frequently booked well in advance due to ticket costs. Pedicabs and motorized tricycles are the means of transportation within the town. Jeepneys, vans, and buses are the means of transportation between Catarman and neighboring towns. Several vans and bus companies also operate to serve travelers between the town and Manila.

== Education ==
Catarman is home to the University of Eastern Philippines, the first state university in the Visayas and the largest university by student population and curriculum in Eastern Visayas. The university has satellite campuses in the province, one in Laoang and the other in Catubig (officially known the Pedro Rebadulla Memorial Campus), and has several extension programs offered across satellite campuses in the region.

Other prominent public and private educational institutions:

Elementary:

- Catarman Chinese Chamber Elementary School
- Catarman II Central School
- Catarman III Central School
- Baybay Elementary School
- Catarman SpEd Center
- Cawayan Integrated School
- Colegio de San Lorenzo Ruiz de Manila
- Northern Samar Colleges
- University of Eastern Philippines Laboratory Elementary School

High School:

- University of Eastern Philippines Laboratory High School
- Colegio de San Lorenzo Ruiz de Manila
- Northern Samar Colleges
- Saint Michael Academy (Catarman)
- Catarman National High School
- Eastern Visayas Central Colleges

College/Vocational:

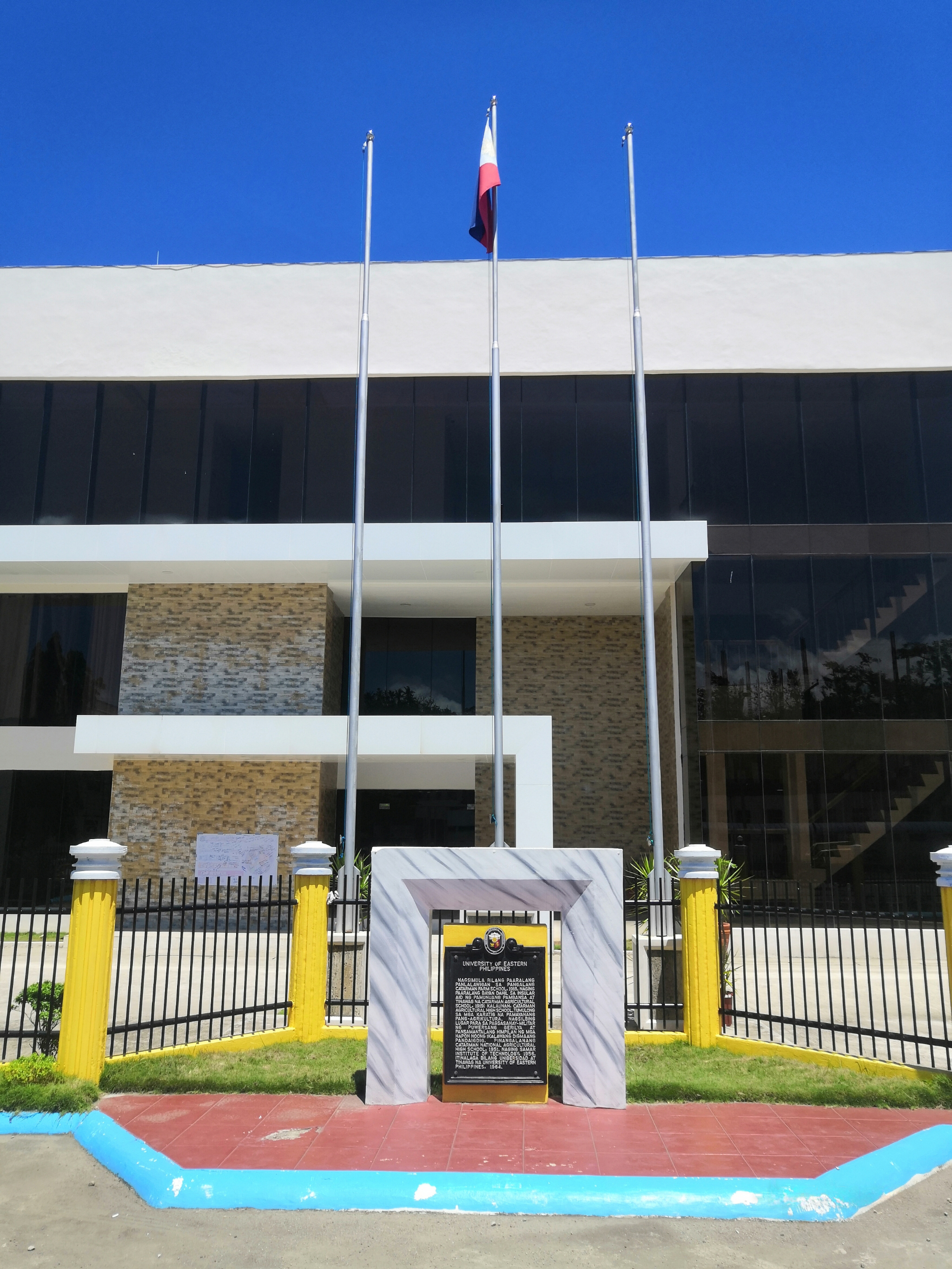
University of Eastern Philippines

- University of Eastern Philippines
- Eastern Visayas Central Colleges
- Colegio De San Lorenzo Ruiz De Manila
- Technical Education and Skills Development Authority (TESDA)
- Global School for Technological Studies
- East Pacific Computer College
- Northern Samar Colleges

== Notable personalities ==
- Narciso Abuke - Lt. Col. and Area Commander of Northern Samar during the Philippine-American War. Killed Pulahan leader Pedro de la Cruz in 1906. Mayor of Catarman 1912–1916
- Pablo Rebadulla - lawyer and Waray-language poet and musician
