= Saint Michael Catholic High School =

Saint Michael Catholic High School may refer to:

- St. Michael Catholic High School (Alabama), United States
- Saint Michael Catholic High School (Niagara Falls, Ontario), United States
- St. Michael's High School, Inc. (Gandara), Philippines
- Saint Michael Academy (Catarman) Philippines
