= Angel Hobayan =

Filipino bishop (1929–2023)

The Most Reverend Angel Hobayan D.D.
- Bishop of Catarman
- Church: Catholic Church
- Province: Palo
- See: Catarman
- Appointed: December 12, 1974
- Installed: March 5, 1975
- Term ended: March 10, 2005
- Predecessor: Position created
- Successor: Emmanuel Trance

Orders
- Ordination: March 25, 1955
- Consecration: March 5, 1975 by Bruno Torpigliani

Personal details
- Born: December 11, 1929 Taft, Samar, Philippines
- Died: March 11, 2023 (aged 93) San Juan, Metro Manila, Philippines
- Motto: Caritas Justitiaque Christi (The charity and justice of Christ)
- Coat of arms

Styles of Angel Hobayan
- Reference style: His Excellency; The Most Reverend
- Spoken style: Your Excellency
- Religious style: Bishop

Angel Tec-i Hobayan (December 11, 1929 – March 11, 2023) was a Filipino bishop of the Roman Catholic Church. He was the first Bishop of Catarman from 1974 to 2005.

== Ministry ==
=== Priesthood ===
Hobayan received the Sacrament of Holy Orders for the Diocese of Calbayog on March 25, 1955. On October 22, 1960, he was ordinated into the clergy of the newly formed Borongan Diocese. He later served as Vicar General of the Diocese of Borongan and Regent of the Jesus Nazareno Seminary in Borongan. From 1968 to 1969, Hobayan led the Diocese of Borongan during the vacancy of the Sede as Capitular Vicar. Pope Paul VI awarded him the papal honorary title of Apostolic Protonotary on June 28, 1974.

=== Bishop ===
On December 12, 1974, Pope Paul VI appointed him as the first bishop of Catarman. The Apostolic Nuncio to the Philippines, Archbishop Bruno Torpigliani, ordained him as a bishop on March 5, 1975, in the Cathedral of the Nativity of the Blessed Virgin Mary in Borongan; Co-consecrators were the Godofredo Pedernal Pisig, Bishop of Borongan, and Ricardo Pido Tancinco, Bishop of Calbayog. Hobayan chose the motto Caritas justitiaque Christi (“The charity and justice of Christ”). The inauguration took place on March 11, 1975.

Pope John Paul II accepted his retirement on March 10, 2005.

== Death ==
Hobayan died at the Cardinal Santos Medical Center in San Juan, Metro Manila, on March 11, 2023. He was 93.

Catholic Church titles
New title	Bishop of Catarman; December 12, 1974 – March 10, 2005	Succeeded by Emmanuel Trance
