= Nolly C. Buco =

21st-century Bishop of Catarman

The Most Reverend Nolly C. Buco DD, JCD, JSD
- Bishop of Catarman
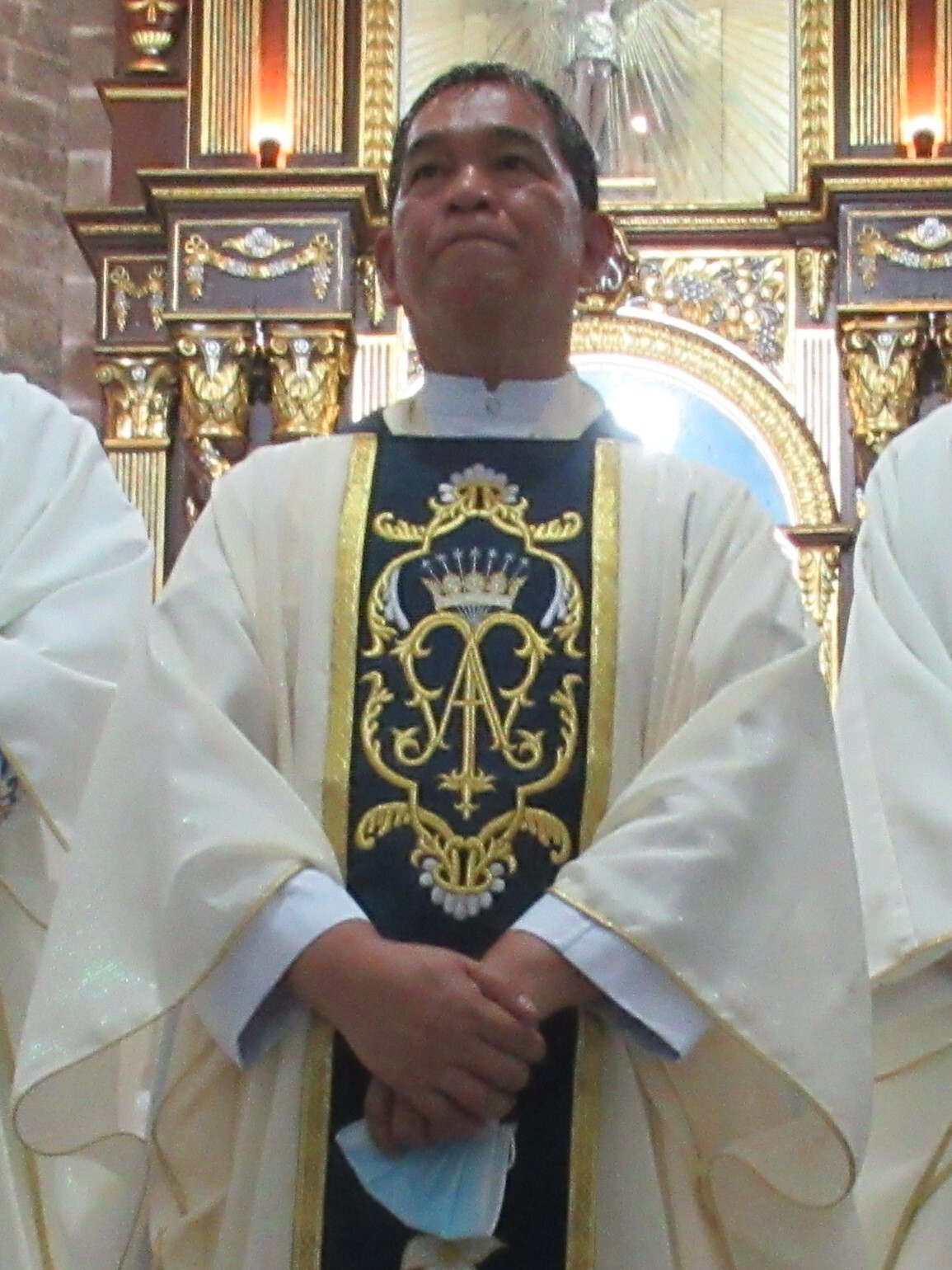
- Buco in 2022
- Church: Catholic Church
- Province: Palo
- See: Catarman
- Appointed: October 16, 2024
- Installed: January 15, 2025
- Predecessor: Emmanuel Trance
- Previous posts: Auxiliary Bishop of Antipolo (2018–2025); Apostolic Administrator of Catarman (2023–2024)

Orders
- Ordination: October 18, 1993 by Protacio Gungon
- Consecration: September 8, 2018 by Francisco Mendoza de Leon

Personal details
- Born: Nolly Camingue Buco; November 27, 1963 (age 62) Baganga, Davao Oriental, Philippines
- Denomination: Catholic Church
- Education: University of Santo Tomas; Immaculate Conception Major Seminary; Sacred Heart Seminary
- Motto: Nolite Timere (Do not be afraid)
- Coat of arms: Nolly C. Buco's coat of arms

Ordination history
History
Diaconal ordination
- Ordained by: Protacio Gungon
Priestly ordination
- Ordained by: Protacio Gungon
Episcopal consecration
- Principal consecrator: Francisco Mendoza de Leon
- Co-consecrators: Oscar Jaime Florencio; Jacinto Agcaoili Jose

Styles of Nolly C. Buco
- Reference style: His Excellency; The Most Reverend
- Spoken style: Your Excellency
- Religious style: Bishop

Nolly Camingue Buco (born 27 November 1963) is a Filipino Catholic prelate who serves as the third bishop of the Diocese of Catarman. Prior to that, he was apostolic administrator of the said diocese following the resignation of Emmanuel Trance for health reasons, while concurrently serving as the auxiliary bishop of the Diocese of Antipolo.

Buco is also Judicial Vicar of the National Tribunal of Appeals, a Church office that handles marriage nullity cases in the Philippines. He is the author of the 2024 book, Freeing Distressed Couple from Guilt, The Need for State Recognition of the Church's Declaration on Marriage Nullity.

== Early life and education ==
Buco was born in Baganga, Davao Oriental. After finishing high school, he enrolled at the Seminary of the Sacred Heart in Palo, Leyte, earning a degree in philosophy. Buco then transferred to the Immaculate Conception Major Seminary in Guiguinto, Bulacan for his theological studies, graduating in 1993.

== Priesthood ==
Buco was ordained a deacon on March 25, 1993, then as priest for the diocese of Antipolo on October 18, 1993. Both ceremonies were presided by then bishop of Antipolo Protacio Gungon.

Buco subsequently studied Canon Law at the University of Santo Tomas in Manila, earning his licentiate in 1999 and his doctorate degree in 2004. He also enrolled in a PhD program in Anthropology at the University of the Philippines in Diliman, Quezon City.

Buco held various positions in the diocese such as Judicial Vicar, member of the Presbyteral Consultors, and rector of Our Lady of Peace and Good Voyage Seminary. Before becoming a bishop, his last parish assignment was in Our Lady of Light Parish in Cainta, Rizal.

== Episcopacy ==
In July 2018, Buco was named as auxiliary bishop of Antipolo by Pope Francis. He is known to be the first priest elevated to the episcopate and only the second auxiliary bishop in Antipolo's history. He is also the first alumnus of the Immaculate Conception Major Seminary to become a bishop. He was consecrated as bishop on September 8, 2018. Bishop Francisco Mendoza de Leon of Antipolo acted as principal consecrator, with bishops Oscar Jaime Florencio and Jacinto Jose serving as co-consecrators. For his episcopal ministry, Buco chose the motto, Lex Dei Vitae Lampas (The Law of God is the Lamp of Life), taken from Psalm 19:8 of the Christian Bible, which he used from 2018 to 2025.

On December 8, 2023, Pope Francis appointed Buco as apostolic administrator of the Diocese of Catarman, simultaneous with the pope's acceptance of the resignation of its bishop, Emmanuel Trance, for health reasons.

On October 16, 2024, Buco was eventually appointed as the third Bishop of Catarman in an announcement made by Pope Francis. He was installed on January 15, 2025, at the Our Lady of the Annunciation Cathedral. In preparation for his new assignment, Buco's coat of arms and motto were replaced. His new episcopal motto is Nolite Timere (Be not afraid), inspired by the Biblical verse, John 6:20.

Catholic Church titles
Preceded by Emmanuel Trance	Bishop of Catarman; January 15, 2025 – present	Incumbent
Preceded by Donatien Bafuidinsoni Maloko-Mana	— TITULAR — Bishop of Gemellae in Byzacena; September 8, 2018 – October 16, 2024	Succeeded by Gregg M. Caggianelli
