= Lope de Vega, Northern Samar =

Municipality in Northern Samar, Philippines

Lope de Vega
- Municipality
- Municipality of Lope de Vega
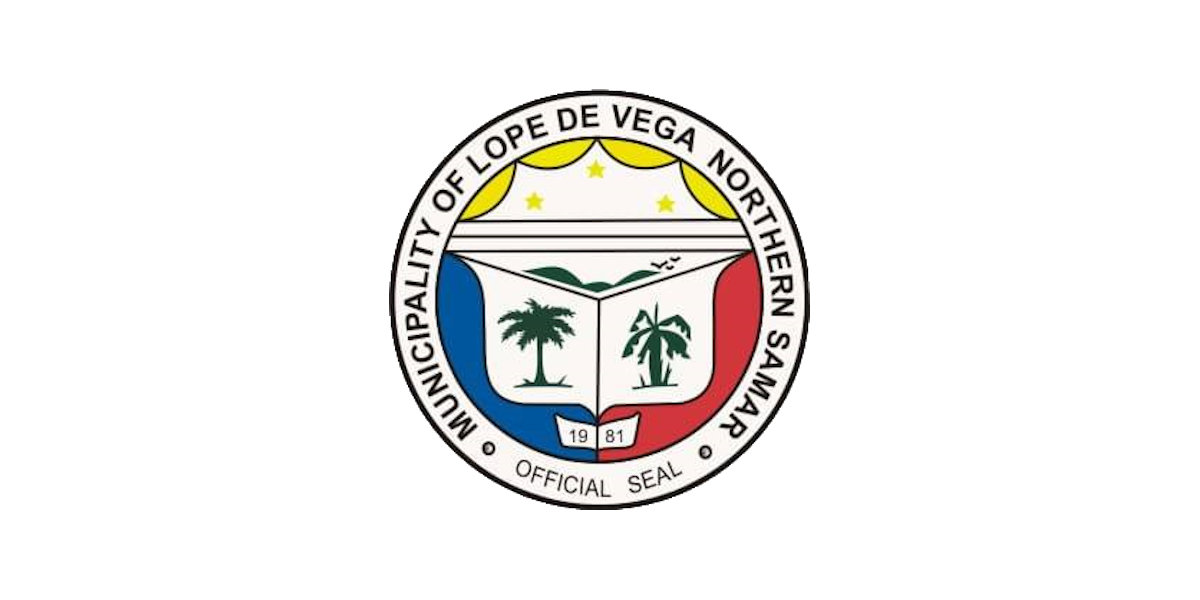
- Flag

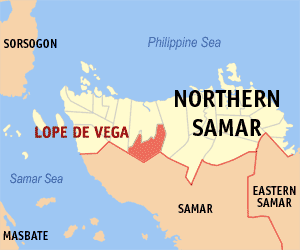
- Map of Northern Samar with Lope de Vega highlighted
- Interactive map of Lope de Vega
- Location within the Philippines
- Coordinates: 12°17′54″N 124°37′26″E
- Country: Philippines
- Region: Eastern Visayas
- Province: Northern Samar
- District: 1st district
- Named for: Lope de Vega
- Barangays: 22 (see Barangays)

Government
  - Type: Sangguniang Bayan
  - Mayor: Ana T. Palloc
  - Vice Mayor: Bobby C. Lluz
  - Representative: Niko Raul Daza
  - Councilors: List: • Kathleen C. Bandal; • Gregorio M. Carpio; • Ferdinand C. Salvacruz; • Redelia A. Espedilla; • Oscar L. Justan; • Rogelio V. Justan; • Elito O. Tonog; • Honeybelle Eden L. Bation; DILG Masterlist of Officials
  - Electorate: 11,765 voters (2025)

Area
  - Total: 280.00 km^{2} (108.11 sq mi)
- Elevation: 110 m (360 ft)
- Highest elevation: 297 m (974 ft)
- Lowest elevation: 19 m (62 ft)

Population (2024 census)
  - Total: 15,779
  - Density: 56.354/km^{2} (145.96/sq mi)
  - Households: 3,110

Economy
  - Income class: 3rd municipal income class
  - Poverty incidence: 34.54% (2023)
  - Revenue: ₱ 155.8 million (2024)
  - Assets: ₱ 314.2 million (2024)
  - Expenditure: ₱ 138.4 million (2024)
  - Liabilities: ₱ 72.21 million (2024)

Service provider
  - Electricity: Northern Samar Electric Cooperative (NORSAMELCO)
- Time zone: UTC+8 (PST)
- ZIP code: 6403
- PSGC: 0804824000
- IDD : area code: +63 (0)55
- Native languages: Waray; Tagalog
- Website: www.lopedevega-nsamar.gov.ph

Lope de Vega, officially the Municipality of Lope de Vega (Waray: Bungto han Lope de Vega; Tagalog: Bayan ng Lope de Vega), is a municipality in the province of Northern Samar, Philippines. According to the 2024 census, it has a population of 15,779 people.

It is bordered in the north by Catarman and Mondragon in the east and the province of Samar in the south.

Lope de Vega was created under Batas Pambansa Blg. 69 on May 1, 1980, separating 22 barangays from Catarman. It is named after the Baroque Spanish playwright and poet Lope de Vega.

== Geography ==
=== Barangays ===
Lope De Vega is politically subdivided into 22 barangays. Each barangay consists of puroks and some have sitios.

- Bayho
- Bonifacio
- Cagamesarag
- Cag-aguingay
- Curry
- Gebonawan
- Gen. Luna
- Getigo
- Henaronagan
- Lope De Vega (Poblacion)
- Lower Caynaga
- Maghipid
- Magsaysay
- Osmeña
- Paguite
- Roxas
- Sampaguita
- San Francisco
- San Jose
- San Miguel
- Somoroy
- Upper Caynaga

=== Climate ===
Climate data for Lope de Vega, Northern Samar
Month	Jan	Feb	Mar	Apr	May	Jun	Jul	Aug	Sep	Oct	Nov	Dec	Year
Mean daily maximum °C (°F)	27 (81)	28 (82)	29 (84)	30 (86)	31 (88)	30 (86)	29 (84)	29 (84)	29 (84)	29 (84)	29 (84)	28 (82)	29 (84)
Mean daily minimum °C (°F)	22 (72)	22 (72)	22 (72)	22 (72)	24 (75)	24 (75)	24 (75)	24 (75)	24 (75)	24 (75)	23 (73)	23 (73)	23 (74)
Average precipitation mm (inches)	84 (3.3)	59 (2.3)	58 (2.3)	55 (2.2)	93 (3.7)	133 (5.2)	149 (5.9)	125 (4.9)	155 (6.1)	165 (6.5)	140 (5.5)	136 (5.4)	1,352 (53.3)
Average rainy days	18.1	13.6	15.8	16.1	21.7	25.5	26.6	25.1	24.8	25.8	22.7	20.1	255.9
Source: Meteoblue

== Demographics ==
Population census of Lope de Vega
Year	Pop.	±% p.a.
1990	9,254	—
1995	11,947	+4.90%
2000	11,754	−0.35%
2007	12,173	+0.48%
2010	13,542	+3.95%
2015	14,687	+1.56%
2020	14,690	+0.00%
2024	15,779	+1.73%
Source: Philippine Statistics Authority

== Economy ==
Poverty incidence of Lope de Vega (%)

Source: Philippine Statistics Authority

== Transportation ==
Lope de Vega is served by buses, jeepneys, and van-for-hire with service to Catarman, Calbayog and to Tacloban City. There are ships also that travels from Calbayog to Cebu City. The town has no airport, but is accessible via nearby Catarman National Airport and Calbayog Airport.
