= Emmanuel Trance =

Filipino bishop (born 1953)

The Most Reverend Emmanuel Trance D.D., Ph.D.
- Bishop Emeritus of Catarman
- Church: Catholic Church
- Province: Palo
- See: Catarman
- Appointed: May 14, 2004
- Installed: March 10, 2005
- Retired: December 8, 2023
- Predecessor: Angel Hobayan
- Successor: Nolly Camingue Buco

Orders
- Ordination: May 17, 1978
- Consecration: July 22, 2004 by Antonio Franco

Personal details
- Born: August 18, 1953 (age 72) Calinog, Iloilo, Philippines
- Motto: Rogate (To Ask)
- Coat of arms

Styles of Emmanuel Trance
- Reference style: His Excellency; The Most Reverend
- Spoken style: Your Excellency
- Religious style: Bishop

Emmanuel Celeste Trance (born August 18, 1953) is a retired Filipino prelate of the Roman Catholic Church in the Philippines. He is best known for his tenure as the second Bishop of Catarman from 2005 until his resignation in 2023.

== Ministry ==
Trance was ordained on May 17, 1978, and incardinated in the Archdiocese of Jaro. After several years of pastoral practice, he became involved with the seminary in Iloilo, where he was, among others, librarian, vice-rector and rector.

On May 14, 2004, Pope John Paul II appointed him Coadjutor Bishop of Catarman. He was consecrated a bishop on July 22, 2004, by Archbishop Antonio Franco. On March 10, 2005, he assumed full rule in the diocese.

== Resignation ==
On December 8, 2023, he announced his resignation during the mass of the Feast of the Immaculate Conception in which Pope Francis accepted. Citing health reasons as the cause for his early retirement, he resigned at the age of 70, five years ahead of the mandatory retirement age of 75 for bishops. His resignation was also publicized in the Vatican the same day at noon (7 PM in the Philippines).

In turn, Auxiliary Bishop Nolly Buco of the Diocese of Antipolo served as the diocese's apostolic administrator until he was appointed as its new bishop succeeding Trance.

Catholic Church titles
Preceded by Angel Hobayan	Bishop of Catarman; March 10, 2005 – December 8, 2023	Succeeded by Nolly C. Buco
