= Catarman National High School =

Public school in Northern Samar, Philippines

Location
- Catarman, Northern Samar; Philippines
- Coordinates: 12°30′18″N 124°37′30″E

Information
- School type: Public
- Established: June 10, 1983

Catarman National High School is a public high school located at Rizal Street Extension, Barangay Dalakit in Catarman, Northern Samar, Philippines. It offers K to 12 curriculum and Senior High School (SHS) program. There is also a Special Program for the Arts (SPA) and in connection to this, there were workshops conducted by several artists for a cultural exchange program.

== History ==
The school was established under Batas Pambansa Bilang (National Law Number) 418 which was signed on June 10, 1983. In 2009, the Catarman National High School Galutan Annex in Barangay Galutan, Catarman turned into a separate independent entity becoming Galutan National High School by virtue of House Bill Number 5979 as enacted by the House of Representatives of the Philippines.
