= Catarman Cathedral =

Catholic church in Northern Samar, Philippines

- Our Lady of the Annunciation Cathedral Parish
- Parroquia Catedral de Nuestra Señora de la Anunciación (Spanish)
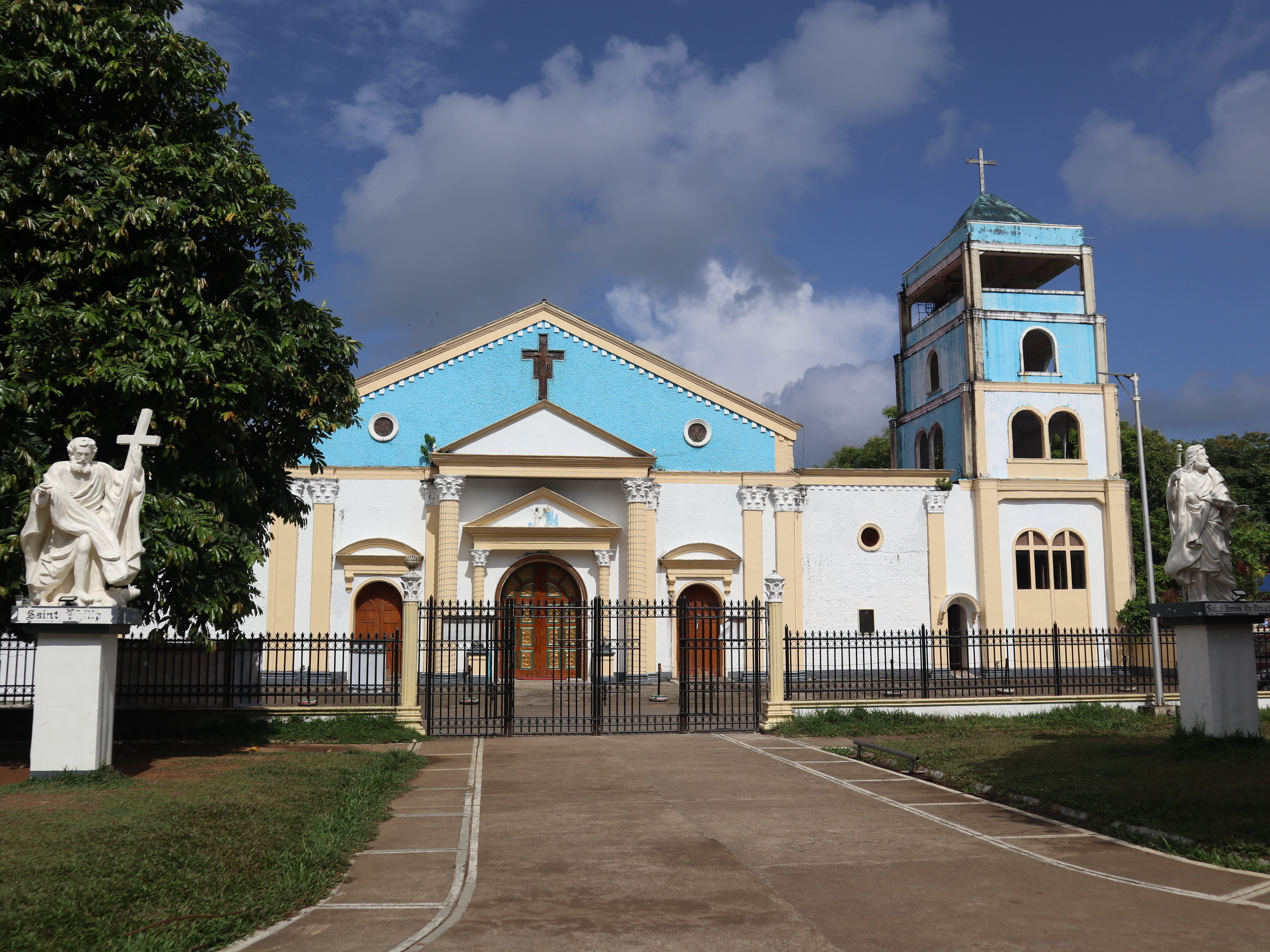
- Cathedral facade in 2023

- Location in the Visayas Location in the Philippines
- 12°29′55″N 124°38′11″E
- Location: Catarman, Northern Samar
- Country: Philippines
- Denomination: Roman Catholic

History
- Status: Cathedral
- Founded: 1596
- Dedication: Our Lady of the Annunciation
- Consecrated: 1596

Architecture
- Functional status: Active
- Architectural type: Church building
- Style: Baroque
- Completed: 1649, 1854

Administration
- Archdiocese: Palo
- Diocese: Catarman

Clergy
- Bishop: Most Rev. Nolly C. Buco

Our Lady of the Annunciation Cathedral Parish, commonly known as Catarman Cathedral, is a Roman Catholic cathedral in the municipality of Catarman, Northern Samar, in the Philippines. It is dedicated to the Virgin Mary under the title Our Lady of the Annunciation, and has been the cathedral of the Diocese of Catarman since the diocese's establishment in 1974.

== History ==
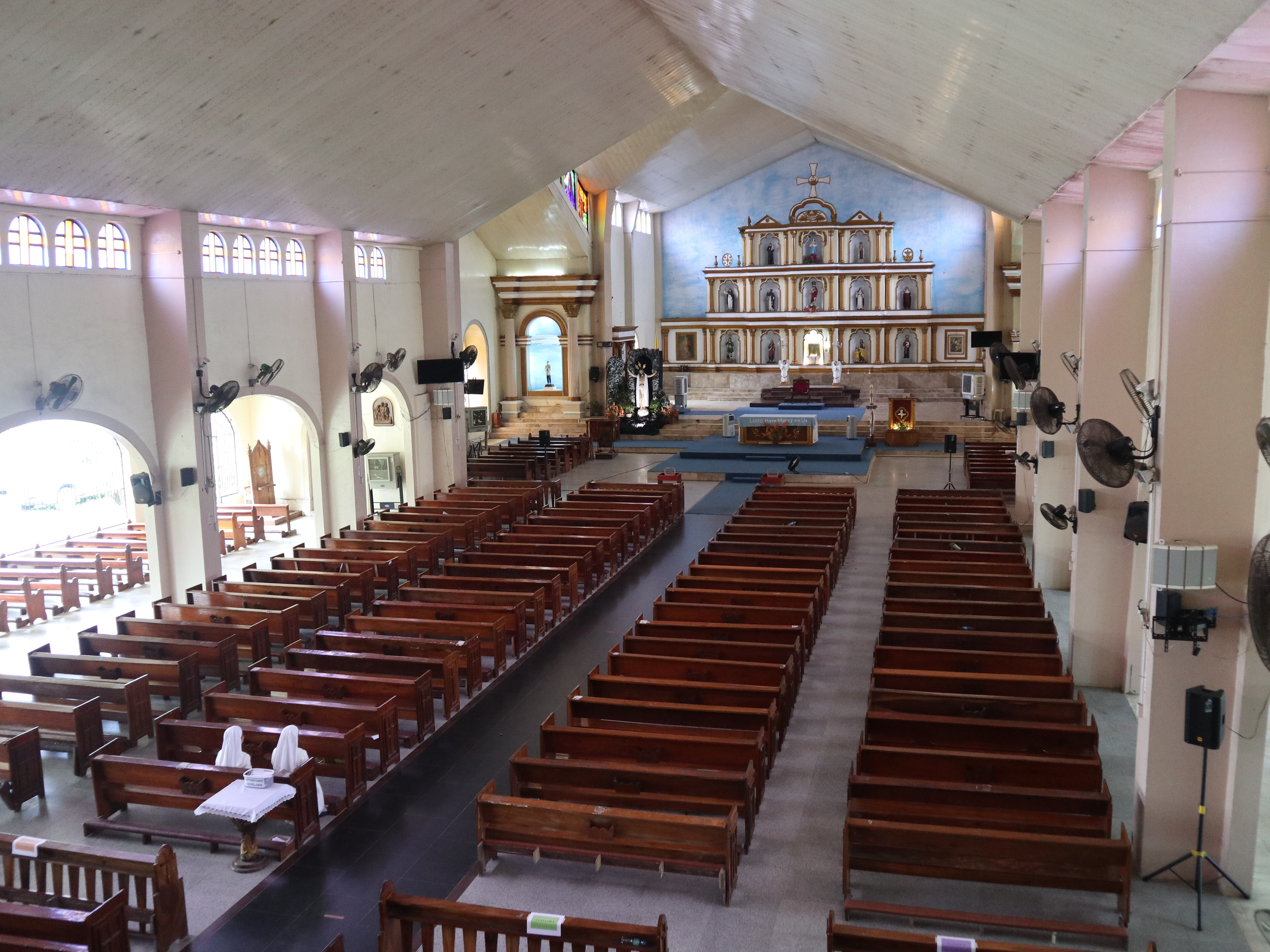
Cathedral interior in 2023

The Jesuits ordered the construction of the first church made out of wood and nipa as a visita of the parish of Palapag, under the patronage of the Nuestra Senora de la Anunciacion in 1596. The said church was subsequently reconstructed after it was burned in an uprising headed by Agustin Sumuroy in 1649. The Franciscans took over the administration of Catarman in 1768. Fray Vicente Lopez, OFM ordered the construction of the fort as a defense against the frequent raids of Moro pirates. On December 8, 1854, the church was again reconstructed after suffering heavy damage during a typhoon. The parish church of Catarman became the island's newest cathedral when it was canonically dedicated as the seat of the Diocese of Catarman on March 11, 1975.
