= Frank Andre =

Francis Xavier "Frank" Macek Andre (July 20, 1888 – January 16, 1959) was a purported Austrian-American faith healer, known as "The goat doctor of the Sierras."

== Biography ==
Born in Vienna, Austria, Andre was orphaned at the age of six when his parents died in the Austro-Hungarian Empire. He came to California as a young man in 1911 after his adoption by Ernest Frank Andre (1865-1961) and Anna Elizabeth Raker Andre (1865-1948).

He opened his controversial medical practice in 1921, conducting sessions barefoot because, in his words, "you contact the soil directly and get health giving powers from the good earth" and with hair reaching to his shoulders because "if you cut it, it diminishes the power."

"I don't claim to cure anyone," Andre said, "I tell those who need medical treatment to see a doctor. My treatment is mostly a form of chiropractic adjust." His fee was the same to all — a flat $3.

His nickname, "Goat Doctor", came from his herd of goats, kept near his mountain cabin about eight miles north of Placerville, near the area later called Swansboro. After he died, much of the proceeds of his practice were found, buried, on Andre's land by famed treasure seeker James A. Normandi (a.k.a. Jimmy Sierra). Coins from the "Goat Doctor Cache" command a premium with history collectors.
