= San Marcos High School =

San Marcos High School may refer to:

- San Marcos High School (San Marcos, California)
- San Marcos High School (Santa Barbara, California)
- San Marcos High School (Texas)
