= Saint Michael Academy (Catarman) =

Roman Catholic school in Northern Samar, Philippines

Location
- Catarman, Northern Samar, 6400; Philippines; 12°29′55″N 124°38′10″E

Information
- Former name: St. Michael Junior College (SMJC)
- School type: Private Dominican
- Motto: "In the Service of Truth"; "Passion for Truth and Compassion for Humanity (Contemplata Alis Tradere)"
- Denomination: Roman Catholic
- Patron saints: St. Michael the Archangel and all Dominican saints
- Established: 1946
- Founder: Bishop Miguel Acebedo
- Authority: Congregation of the Dominican Sisters of St. Catherine of Siena - Philippines
- Principal: Pinlyn B. Dahili
- Grades: 7 - 12
- Age range: 12 - 18
- Language: English; Filipino; Waray-Waray
- Classrooms: 24
- Colours: Red, Black, White
- Song: SMA Hymn
- Nickname: Michaelians; SMAers
- Newspaper: The M
- Yearbook: Michaelians Are We
- Website: smacatarman.edu.ph

St. Michael Academy is a private, sectarian, non-stock Catholic secondary school in Catarman, Northern Samar, Philippines. It is the first and only Catholic learning institution established in the city, owned and operated by the Congregation of the Dominican Sisters of St. Catherine of Siena - Philippines; thus, the only Dominican educational institution found in the Samar - Leyte region operating since 1946.

== History ==
1980s

SMA became part of the Diocese of Catarman's history when it celebrated its 10th anniversary as a Diocese by staging a show in 1985.

As the new government was installed, a new 2 floor building was proposed by Sr. Patricia Aguilar, OP, and during the late 1980s the new building was inaugurated, now the St. Dominic Building.

1990s

In the 1990s, enrolment rose dramatically. The school's population reached a thousand which resulted to insufficient classrooms and other school facilities. As a result, another 2-storey building was constructed, now the St. Catherine Building, through the effort of Sr. Florencia Cabañog, OP. It houses some of the Administrative Offices, the Faculty Room, the Science Laboratory, the Learning Resource Center, the Computer Laboratory, the School Clinic and the Guidance Office. There were many scholarships offered then, from the government, alumni, private persons and agencies. But in the late 1990s, the enrolment gradually decreased again because of free education in public schools.

On February 27, 1994, SMA Alumni Foundation, Inc was officially founded that grants scholarship for the children of the needy alumni among others.

Due to the implementation of K+12 policy of the Department of Education as a reform in our national educational system starting school year 2012–2013, the need for the construction of another building, now the Mother Francisca Building, to house additional classrooms, the bookstore and supplies store and the transfer of the canteen has been initiated through the untiring leadership of Sr. Meriza Ocampo, OP.

Presently, the school has a total enrolment of more than 750 students. It has 2 two-floor buildings, a new three-floor building, a bigger multi-purpose hall, a student lounge, a Computer Laboratory with 50 units of computer, an enhanced library and a Chapel among others.

The school had also undergone Congregational Evaluation Visit 1 in February 1995 and Congregational Evaluation Visit 2 in February 2000. These series of evaluation visits are in preparation for the school to be a PAASCU Accredited School in the near future. During the school year 2003-2004 under Sr. Trinidad Garcia, OP, the SMA was rated ABOVE STANDARD and was recognized as ONE of the EXCELLENT SCHOOLS in Region VIII by the ESC Certifying Team sent by the DepEd and FAPE Regional Offices. Last November 2008, a re-assessment was concluded by the same offices and once again, the school was rated as an ABOVE STANDARD school.
