= Swansboro, California =

Unincorporated community in California, United States

Swansboro Country
- Subdivision of Placerville, California
- Nickname: Mosquito
- Location of Swansboro Country in California.

- Location in the United States
- Coordinates: 38°43′47″N 120°47′55″W
- Country: United States
- State: California
- County: El Dorado

Area
  - Total: 5.812 sq mi (15.054 km^{2})
  - Land: 5.812 sq mi (15.052 km^{2})
  - Water: 0.00077 sq mi (0.002 km^{2}) 0.01%
- Elevation: 1,867 ft (569 m)

Population (2010)
  - Total: 10,389
  - Density: 1,787.6/sq mi (690.21/km^{2})
- Time zone: UTC-8 (PST)
  - Summer (DST): UTC-7 (PDT)
- ZIP code: 95667
- Area code: 530
- FIPS code: 06-57540
- GNIS feature IDs: 277577, 2411433
- Website: www.cityofplacerville.org

California Historical Landmark
- Reference no.: 701

Swansboro Country; a subdivision within the community of Mosquito, is a residential area northeast of Placerville, the county seat of El Dorado County, California. The population was approximately 1,000 at the 2010 census. It is part of the Sacramento–Arden-Arcade–Roseville Metropolitan Statistical Area.

== Geography ==
Swansboro is located northeast of U.S. Route 50 where it crosses State Route 49. From the south, it is accessible only via Rock Creek Road, or via the “Swinging Bridge” over the American River canyon on Mosquito Road.

== Demographics ==
Swansboro is a community of over 200 homes on multi-acre lots

== History ==
After the discovery of gold at Sutter's Mill in nearby Coloma, California, by James W. Marshall in 1848 sparked the California Gold Rush, gold mines were discovered in Mosquito Canyon. Most of the mining population settled in two different places, one being called Nelsonville and the other Lowertown or Big House. Ben Summerfield and John Bennett on One Eye Creek built a sawmill in 1851. In 1853, the existing name of Mosquito was given to the area.

In 1854, the Mosquito voting precinct was established and also an irrigation ditch taking water from Slab Creek was built by the Mosquito Ditch Company, owned by James Summerfield at a cost of $20,000. In 1859, a road was ordered built by the County Board of Supervisors from Placerville to Mosquito Village. In 1862, the Mosquito School was started.

In 1867, the “Swinging Bridge” was built on Mosquito Road, now a County Historical Landmark. The cables were made by Hiram Tipton, an Englishman, at a site near the bridge.

In 1882, the Mosquito School District was established, and the Mosquito Post Office was started.

In 1905, the Swansborough family bought the Dickenson property, where the Post Office had been. The American River Electric Company brought up water for the AREC power house on the American River just below the community of Mosquito.

In 1907, Finnon Lake was completed and later became a state owned, county leased recreation area run by a private concessionaire.

Between 1911 and 1915, a telephone line was constructed between Placerville and Mosquito. Mosquito was also one of the first areas in El Dorado County to have electric power. In 1926, the present Swansborough house was built on the location of the one purchased from the Dickensons which burned in 1924.

In 1934, a large Civilian Conservation Corps was established at Mosquito with 200 or more boys at a time. It was operated by the U.S. Army and the U.S. Forest Service. During World War II, the camp housed conscientious objectors who acted as forest service fire crews, without pay, during the fire seasons.

From 1943 through the 1960s, a large sawmill operated in Mosquito and logs were brought from as far away as Bishop, California.

After World War II, Frank Andre – the legendary “Goat Doctor” faith healer – lived here until he died in 1959. People came from all over the United States for his healing touch.

In 1968, the Swansboro subdivision was started with property purchased from the Swansborough, Darr, Morton, and Lawyer families. This was the first rural subdivision in El Dorado County.

Nearby downtown Placerville was a central hub for the Mother Lode region's mining operations. The town had many services, including transportation (of people and goods), lodging, banking, and had a market and general store. The history of hard-rock mining is evidenced by an open and accessible Gold Bug Park & Mine, now a museum with tours and books.

== Government ==
In the California State Legislature, Swansboro is in the 1st senatorial district, represented by Republican Megan Dahle, and the 5th Assembly district, represented by Republican Joe Patterson.

In the United States House of Representatives, Swansboro is in California's 4th congressional district, represented by Democrat Mike Thompson.

== Climate ==
Swansboro has cool, frequently wet winters and hot, dry summers, creating a typically Californian Mediterranean climate (Köppen Csa). Average January temperatures are a maximum of 53.4 °F (11.9 °C) and a minimum of 32.5 °F (0.3 °C). Average July temperatures are a maximum of 92.7 °F (33.7 °C) and a minimum of 57.2 °F (14.0 °C). Annually, there are an average of 65.7 days with highs of 90 °F (32 °C) or higher and 61.3 mornings with lows of 32 °F (0 °C) or lower. The record high temperature was 114 °F (46 °C) on July 4, 1911. The record low temperature was 8 °F (−13.3 °C) on December 9, 1972.

Average annual rainfall in Swansboro is 38.11 inches (968.0 mm). There an average of 66 days with measurable rain. The wettest calendar year was 1983 with 74.55 inches (1,893.6 mm) and the driest 1976 with 11.85 inches (301 mm). The most rainfall in one month was 23.29 inches (591.6 mm) in December 1955. The most rainfall in 24 hours was 6.22 inches (158 mm) on February 14, 2000.

== Transportation ==
Swansboro is served by two major highways. U.S. Route 50 heads west to Sacramento and east to South Lake Tahoe. California State Route 49 runs north and south, connecting the city with the other major communities in the Sierra Nevada foothills.

Swansboro is served by the privately owned Swansboro Country Airport.
