= American Railway Express Company Garage =

- U.S. National Register of Historic Places
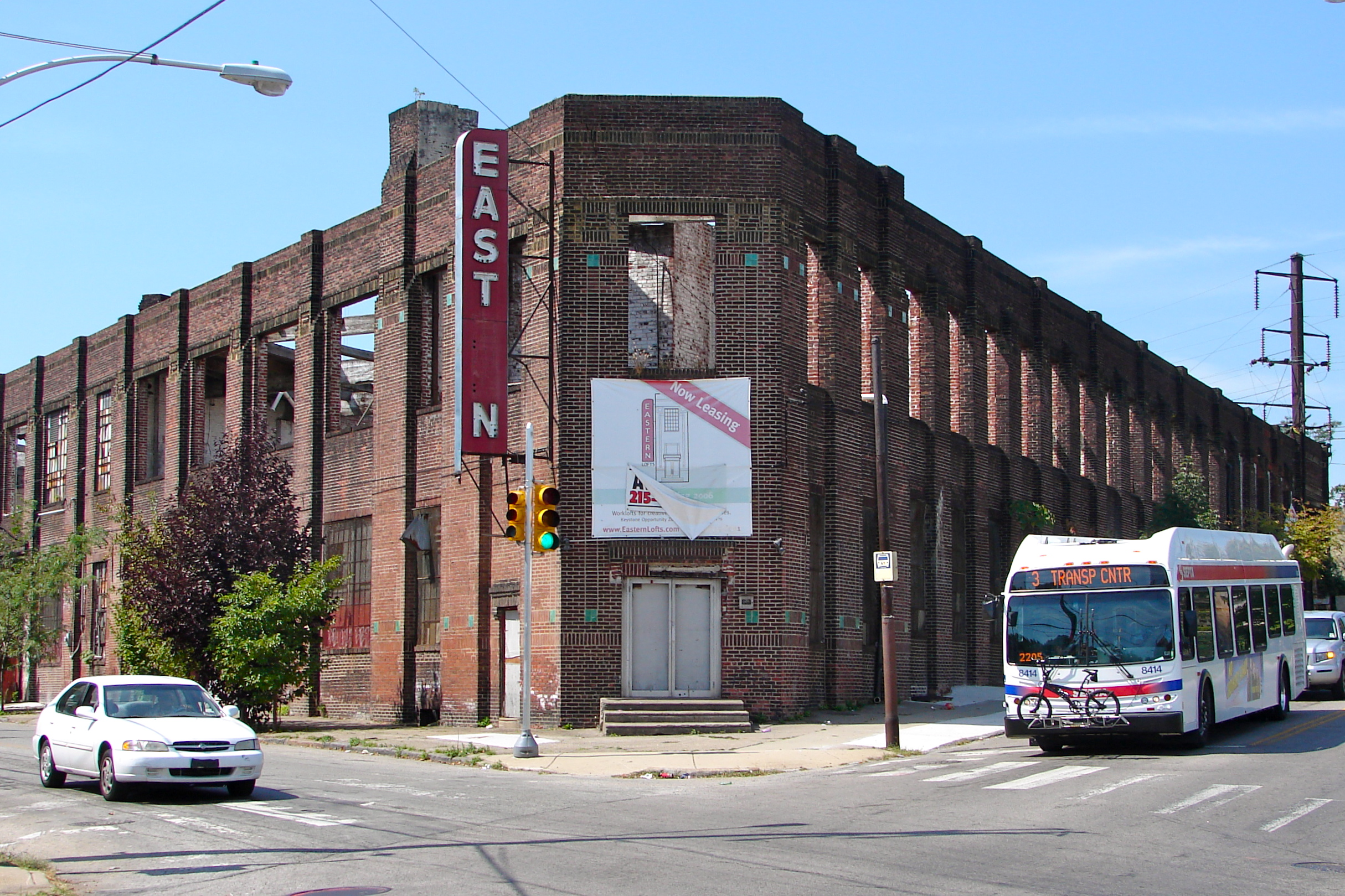

- Location within Philadelphia Location within Pennsylvania Location within the United States
- Location: 3002-3028 Cecil B. Moore Ave., Philadelphia, Pennsylvania
- Coordinates: 39°59′2″N 75°11′3″W
- Area: less than one acre
- Built: 1922
- Architect: Harris & Richards; Lamb, Robert E., Company
- Architectural style: Early Commercial
- NRHP reference No.: 06000664
- Added to NRHP: August 2, 2006

The American Railway Express Company Garage is a historic parking garage located at 3002-3028 Cecil B. Moore Ave. in the Strawberry Mansion neighborhood of north Philadelphia, Pennsylvania. It was designed by the firm Harris & Richards and constructed by the Robert E. Lamb Company in 1922 for developer John Presper Eckert, Sr.

== History ==
Eckert was the owner of the Philadelphia Realty Company, and during the 1920s he consulted with the American Railway Express Company (AREC) to build garages throughout the United States, as well as in Europe and Egypt. AREC's business was to ship express packages nationally by railway and to pick up and deliver them locally by truck. Thus AREC needed garages located near railway lines. The Philadelphia garage abuts railway tracks now owned by Amtrak and probably served customers in the Brewerytown neighborhood a few blocks to the south.

Eckert's son, John Presper Eckert, Jr. later became famous as the inventor of ENIAC and other early computers.

In August 2006, the site was listed in the National Register of Historic Places. Though a sign on the building proclaimed "Now Leasing," in photographs accompanying the 2006 NRHP nomination, and in September 2010 (see photograph above), the roof was removed in 2004.

A new plan to restore the building was announced in 2015. The garage was to be turned into 36 apartments with parking, a pre-school and day care, and a fitness facility by Mosaic Development Partners and Cedar Grove Partners, with financing from Philadelphia LISC, historic tax credits and New Market Tax Credits.
