= University of Eastern Philippines =

Public university in Northern Samar, Philippines

- Pamantasan ng Silangang Pilipinas (Filipino)
- Former names: Catarman Farm School (September 1918); Catarman Agricultural School; Catarman National Agricultural High School (1950); Samar Institute of Technology (1956)
- Motto: Molding Character, Producing Life Winners
- Type: state university
- Established: 1918
- Chairman: Emmanuel Angeles, LLB, PhD
- President: Dr. Cherry I. Ultra
- Vice-president: Dr. Ronaldo A. Amit (VP for Academic Affairs); Bryan V. Navaroza (VP for Administration & Finance); Dr. Nelia M. Adora (VP for External Affairs); Dr. Ronato S. Ballado (VP for Research & Extension)
- Location: Catarman, Northern Samar, Philippines; 12°30′31″N 124°39′54″E
- Campus: 516 ha, Rural
- Colors: Blue and Gold
- Website: www.uep.edu.ph
- Location in the Visayas Location in the Philippines

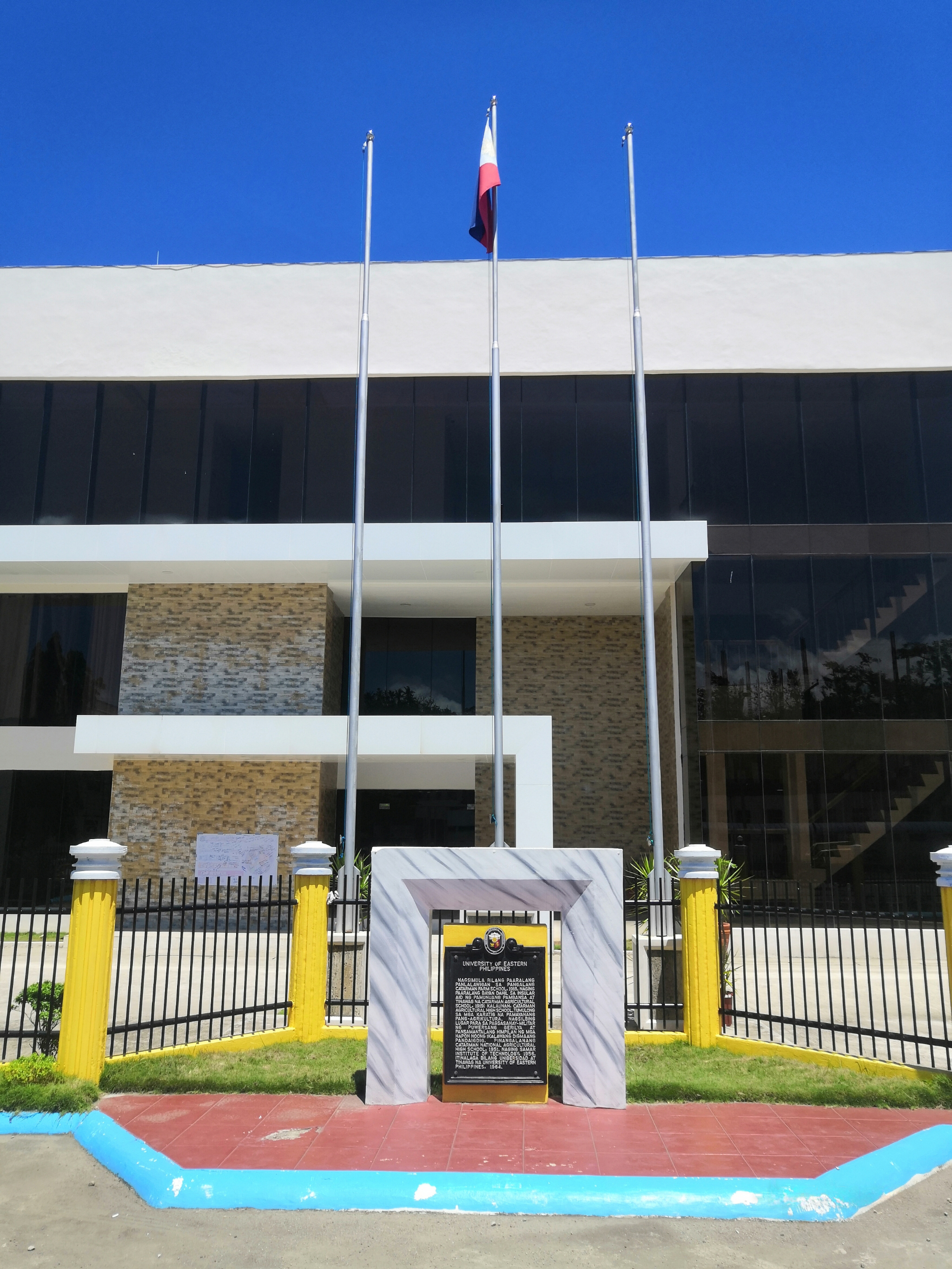
University of Eastern Philippines

The University of Eastern Philippines (Filipino: Pamantasan ng Silangang Pilipinas) is the first state university in the Visayas. It offers the largest number of undergraduate and graduate degree programs and short-term courses and certificates among the higher education institutions in the Eastern Visayas region. Its flagship campus is in Catarman, Northern Samar.

== History ==
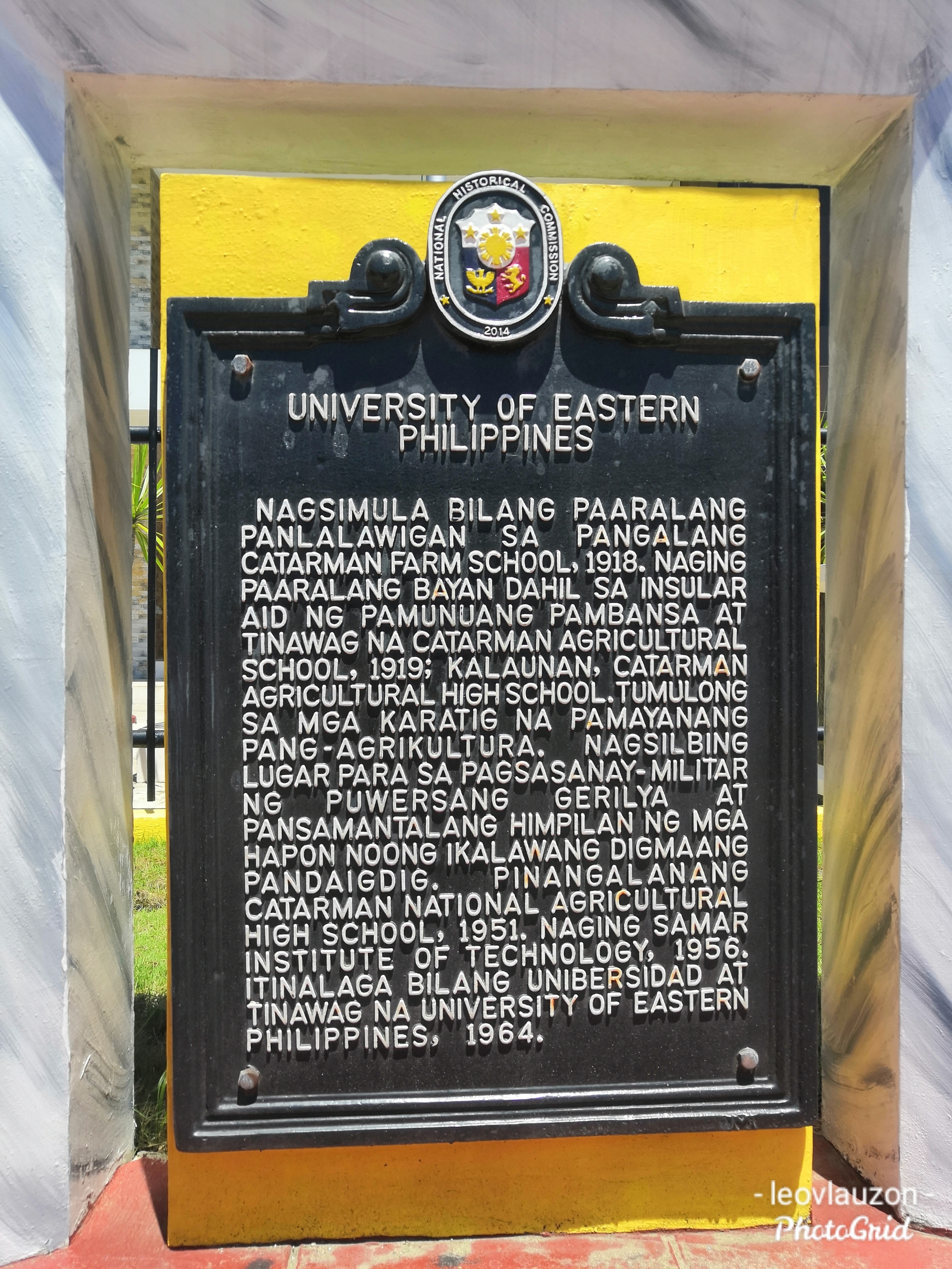
University of Eastern Philippines NHCP marker

The University of Eastern Philippines began as the Catarman Farm School (CFS) in September 1918 in a 516-hectare site of forested mountains and rice fields facing the Pacific Ocean. Then Governor Clodualdo Lucero proposed and sought the approval of the Provincial Board for the establishment of the school.

Its first principal was Washington Wiren from Maine, USA. He was succeeded by Filipino graduates from American agricultural institutions. Dr. Felipe O. Cevallos from Bicol became the first Filipino principal, followed by Pedro Montellano who was on special detail from the Department of Agricultural Education, College of Agriculture, UP in 1923, and by Sabino Q. Ami who opened the secondary Home Economics curriculum in 1930. Agapito Buenaventura came next and was succeeded by Eulogio Acuňa whose term was interrupted by the war in 1941.

The CFS was later named Catarman Agricultural School (CAS), which was proposed by Representative Pedro Mendiola of Catarman, raising its status to Insular Provincial, and subsequently making it the Catarman Agricultural High School (CAHS).

In 1946 Congressman Agripino Escareal and Senate President Jose Avelino Sr. worked for the complete nationalization of the school. Thus in 1950 the school's name was once more changed to the Catarman National Agricultural High School (CNAHS).

With the rapid growth of knowledge and the urgent call for scientific and technological involvement of schools in rebuilding a nation, Samar Congressman Eladio Balite of Bobon, Northern Samar sponsored House Bill 6559 creating the Samar Institute of Technology (SIT), which Pres. Carlos P. Garcia signed into R.A. 1434. With Senators Gil Puyat and Decoroso Rosales and Congressman Balite, SIT was inaugurated on September 7, 1958. The first and only President of SIT was Colonel Emeterio Asinas (Ret.) of Catubig, Northern Samar. It was in his term that the Our Lady of the Miraculous Medal Chapel (which houses the university chaplain) and the UEP Centre for Culture and Pageantry (commonly known as the RAB Amphitheatre) were founded. When he retired on March 4, 1963, Prof. Toribio G. Sorio of Bobon, Northern Samar, Executive Vice President, took over as officer-in-charge until SIT became a university.

In response to the pressing need for manpower development necessary for the upliftment of the socio-economic condition of the service area, House Bill 4050, sponsored by Congressman Eladio T. Balite, was signed by President Diosdado Macapagal on June 20, 1964, converting SIT into the University of Eastern Philippines. UEP is mandated to "primarily give technical and professional training, advanced instruction in literature, philosophy, the sciences and the arts, besides providing for the promotion of scientific and technological researches." The elevation of the school to a university status has, in fact, paved the way towards a dramatic increase in its academic, research, and extension programs as well as the creation of additional colleges, institutes, centers, and offices.

UEP's first president was Dr. Narciso N. Pepito of Cebu who assumed office on January 24, 1966. The Veterinary Medicine Building, Science Building, extensions of the Farm Shop and Machinery Building, the Brackish Water fishpond, former College of Education Building, and the University Research Center were among the completed projects prior to President Pepito's retirement in May 1976.

Before Pres. Pepito's successor was named, the Head Executive Assistant, Atty Sergio Gelera Sr. of Catarman, World War II hero of Calbayog, became the OIC. He was responsible for opening graduate programs.

From November 1977-November 1983, Dr. Aurora Balite Merida, of Bobon, Northern Samar was appointed as the second president. Her time was when the Australians descended upon Samar for the Northern Samar Integrated Rural Development Project (NSIRDP) and linkages with outside agencies took the form of allowing hectares of lands for the NSIRDP's and these agencies’ use.

Between the end of President Merida's term and the appointment of the next president, the CBA Dean, Dr. Gerardo Delorino, became the OIC.

In 1985, Dr. Andres F. Celestino became the 3rd UEP President; he spent more time supervising classes, projects, and construction works.

He put up the Institute for Agricultural and Rural Development (IARD), the NSIRDP-ADAB-founded NORSARC, and the UEP Research and Development Foundation with the research grants from the IDRC, Canada; PCMARD and PhilRice. He applied for UEP's membership in the Association of Asian Agricultural Colleges and Universities (AAACU).

Towards the end of the project, the NSIRDP equipped the Crop and Livestock Diagnostic Laboratory with sophisticated scientific equipment for the Biology Laboratory. The NSIRDP, too, turned over its duck dispersal program and the residences of the Australian nationals to the school.

When President Celestino was gunned down in office on April 5, 1990, Dr. Leonor A. Ong Sotto, then Vice President for Academic Affairs, took over UEP's helm.

On November 15, 1990, Dr.Pedro D. Destura a UEP and UPLB alumnus from Urdaneta, Lavezares, Northern Samar became its 4th President. He enhanced UEP's educational opportunities and reinvigorated the university's Faculty Development Program, which gave rise to a number of PhDs and MAs.

UEP became a Learning Center for the UP Open University, the Regional Science Teaching Center (RSTC) for the non-science and non-mathematics teachers in the elementary and high schools in Region VIII for the Department of Science and Technology (DOST), and the DOE's extension arm in the promotion, development and utilization of new and renewable energy technologies and systems in Eastern Visayas via the UEP Affiliated Renewable Energy Center (AREC).

In 1999 the Pedro Rebadulla Memorial Agricultural College (PRMAC) and the Laoang National Trade School (LNTS), formerly CHED-supervised institutions, were integrated into the university. Since then, they have been operating as UEP PRMC Catubig Campus and UEP-Laoang Campus under the UEP System. After 17 years of service, Dr. Destura left UEP On February 11, 2007.

Prior to the selection of a regular successor, the Board of Regents appointed Dr. Milagros Esparrago, Chief Education Program Specialist of CHED Regional Office V, as UEP's Officer-in-Charge.

On June 15, 2007, in Tacloban City, Atty Mar P. De Asis of Catubig, Northern Samar took his oath of office as the 5th president of the university. A Doctor of Philosophy in Educational Management, he is the second UEP alumnus to occupy the university's highest position. Under his stewardship, UEP's College of Law consistently placed among the top law schools all over the country. He is presently serving his second term as UEP President.

On December 10, 2019, the Board of Regents (BOR) of the University of Eastern Philippines chose Dr. Cherry Ibañez Ultra as the next University President. She is professor at the College of Agriculture, Fisheries, and Natural Resources (CAFNR). Dr. Ultra holds a PhD in Agricultural Economics degree from the University of the Philippines in Los Baños. Dr. Ultra succeeds Dr. Rolando A. Delorino in the key university post. She is the university's seventh president (and second lady president).

President Bongbong Marcos signed Republic Act No. 11972 into law on December 20, 2023, officially establishing the College of Medicine at the University of Eastern Philippines (UEP) in Catarman, Northern Samar. The UEP’s soon-to-launch Doctor of Medicine Program will feature an Integrated Liberal Arts and Medicine curriculum. The program aims to cultivate a new generation of physicians through a learner-centered, competency-based, and community-oriented approach.

== Legal basis ==
UEP is mandated, through Republic Act No. 4126, to "primarily give technical and professional training, advanced instruction in literature, philosophy, the sciences and the arts, besides providing for the promotion of scientific and technological researches and democratic access to education to poor but deserving students, not only in Northern Samar, but also in other parts of the country."

== Campuses and academics ==
UEP has campuses in three municipalities of Northern Samar, Catarman, Laoang, and Catubig. The following colleges, schools, and institutes comprise the Catarman campus:

1. College of Agriculture, Fisheries and Natural Resources, which offers the BS Agriculture, BS Agricultural Education, BS Agribusiness, BS Fisheries major in aquaculture, and BS Forestry degrees.
2. College of Arts and Communication, which offers the AB Literature, BA English, AB Political Science, AB major in Sociology, BS Community Development, BS Development Communication, and BS Public Administration degrees.
3. College of Business Administration, which offers the BS Accountancy, BS Business Administration major in management, BS Business Administration major in marketing, BS in Cooperatives, BS Entrepreneurship, BSBA Business Economics, BSBA Human Resource Management and BS Hotel and Restaurant Management degrees.
4. College of Criminal Justice, which offers BS Criminology degree.
5. College of Education, which offers the Bachelor in Elementary Education (with various specializations) and Bachelor in Secondary Education (with various majors) degrees.
6. College of Engineering, which offers BS Civil Engineering, BS Electrical Engineering, BS Agri-Bio System Engineering, BS Mechanical Engineering, BET Automotive Technology and BET Electrical Technology degrees.
7. College of Law, which offers the Bachelor of L'aws degree.
8. College of Medicine, which offers Doctor of Medicine degree.
9. College of Nursing and Allied Health Sciences, which offers the BS in Nursing, and BS in Radiologic Technology degrees.
10. College of Science, which offers BS Biology, BS Chemistry, BS Environmental Studies, BS Information Technology, BS Marine Biology, and BS Mathematics degrees.
11. College of Veterinary Medicine, which offers Doctor of Veterinary Medicine and Bachelor of Science in Meat Technology degrees.
12. Graduate School

The Catarman campus also has laboratory schools for both elementary and secondary levels.

== Accreditation ==
As of December 31, 2012, over forty degree programs of the University of Eastern Philippines have been accredited or submitted for accreditation to the Accrediting Agency of Chartered Colleges and Universities in the Philippines (AACCUP). These programs and their corresponding accreditation level or status are:

1. Elementary Teacher Education Level III Re-accredited
2. Secondary Teacher Education Level III Re-accredited
3. Home Economics Education Level III Re-accredited
4. Elementary Teacher Education -Home Eco. Level III Re-accredited
5. Graduate: Master's (MAEd) Qualified for Level III
6. Graduate: Master's (MALL) Qualified for Level III
7. Graduate: Master's (MALT) Qualified for Level III
8. Graduate: Master's (MAT) Qualified for Level III
9. Graduate: Master's (MPA) Qualified for Level III
10. Graduate: Doctoral (Ph.D.-Education) Qualified for Level III
11. Graduate: Master's (MBA) Assessment on-going to Qualify for Level III
12. Arts and Social Sciences (Lang.& Lit.Teaching) Level II Re-accredited
13. Arts and Social Science (Political Science) Level II Re-accredited
14. Arts and Social Science (Sociology) Level II Re-accredited
15. Community Development Level II Re-accredited
16. Industrial Teacher Education Level I Accredited
17. Graduate: Doctoral (DBA) Level I Accredited
18. Nursing Level I Accredited
19. Veterinary Medicine Level I Accredited
20. Agricultural Engineering Level I Accredited
21. Civil Engineering Level I Accredited
22. Mechanical Engineering Level I Accredited
23. Accountancy Level I Accredited
24. Business Administration Level I Accredited
25. Business Economics Level I Accredited
26. Agribusiness Level I Accredited
27. Agriculture Level I Accredited
28. Environmental Studies Level I Accredited
29. Information Technology Level I Accredited
30. Marine Biology Level I Accredited
31. Science (Biology) Level I Accredited
32. Science (Chemistry) Level I Accredited
33. Science (Mathematics) Level I Accredited
34. Arts and Social Science (Public Adm.) Level I Accredited
35. Agricultural Teacher Education Level I Accredited
36. Forestry Level I Accredited
37. Fisheries Level I Accredited
38. Graduate: Master's (MM -PM) Level I Accredited
39. Graduate: Doctoral (DALL) Level I Accredited
40. Graduate: Doctoral (DPA) Level I Accredited
41. Entrepreneurship Candidate
42. Cooperatives Candidate
43. Hotel and Restaurant Management Candidate
44. Development Communication Candidate
45. Criminology Candidate
46. Meat Technology Candidate

== Affiliations ==
To reinforce academic-based activities, regular training programs are offered by institutes that have been established as extension arms chiefly intended for capability-building of its target clientele. For instance, the Regional Science Teaching Center has been offering short training courses in mathematics, biology, chemistry, and physics for elementary and secondary school teachers in Eastern Visayas. The Affiliated Non-conventional Energy Centre promotes non-conventional energy systems and provides training and demonstration projects in priority areas of Samar Island. The Information Technology-Electronic Data and Internet Centre provides trainings on computer literacy and internet services aimed at providing students and faculty members an unlimited source of research materials and other educational information. The Northern Samar Agro-Industrial Research and Fabrication Center, in coordination with the College of Agriculture, focuses on research and manufacture of prototype farm equipment.

== Media ==
The university, through the College of Arts and Communication, runs the UNICEF-funded dyNS 102.9 FM radio station, commonly known Huni. The university student newspaper, The Pillar, is published monthly and is publicly available. Every college in this university has its own "student newspaper" and is also publicly available. These student newspapers are listed below:

- College of Arts and Communication - The Spectrum
- College of Business Administration - The Circular
- College of Education - The Accents
- College of Engineering- The Blueprint
- College of Science - The MODEM
- College of Veterinary Medicine - The Veterinary Gazette
- College of Nursing and Allied Health Sciences - The Echoes
- College of Agriculture, Fisheries and Natural Resources - Agritrends
