= Diocese of Catarman =

Latin Catholic diocese in the Philippines

Coordinates: 12.4988°N 124.6369°E

Diocese of Catarman Dioecesis Catarmaniensis Diyosesis han Catarman Diyosesis ng Catarman

Catholic
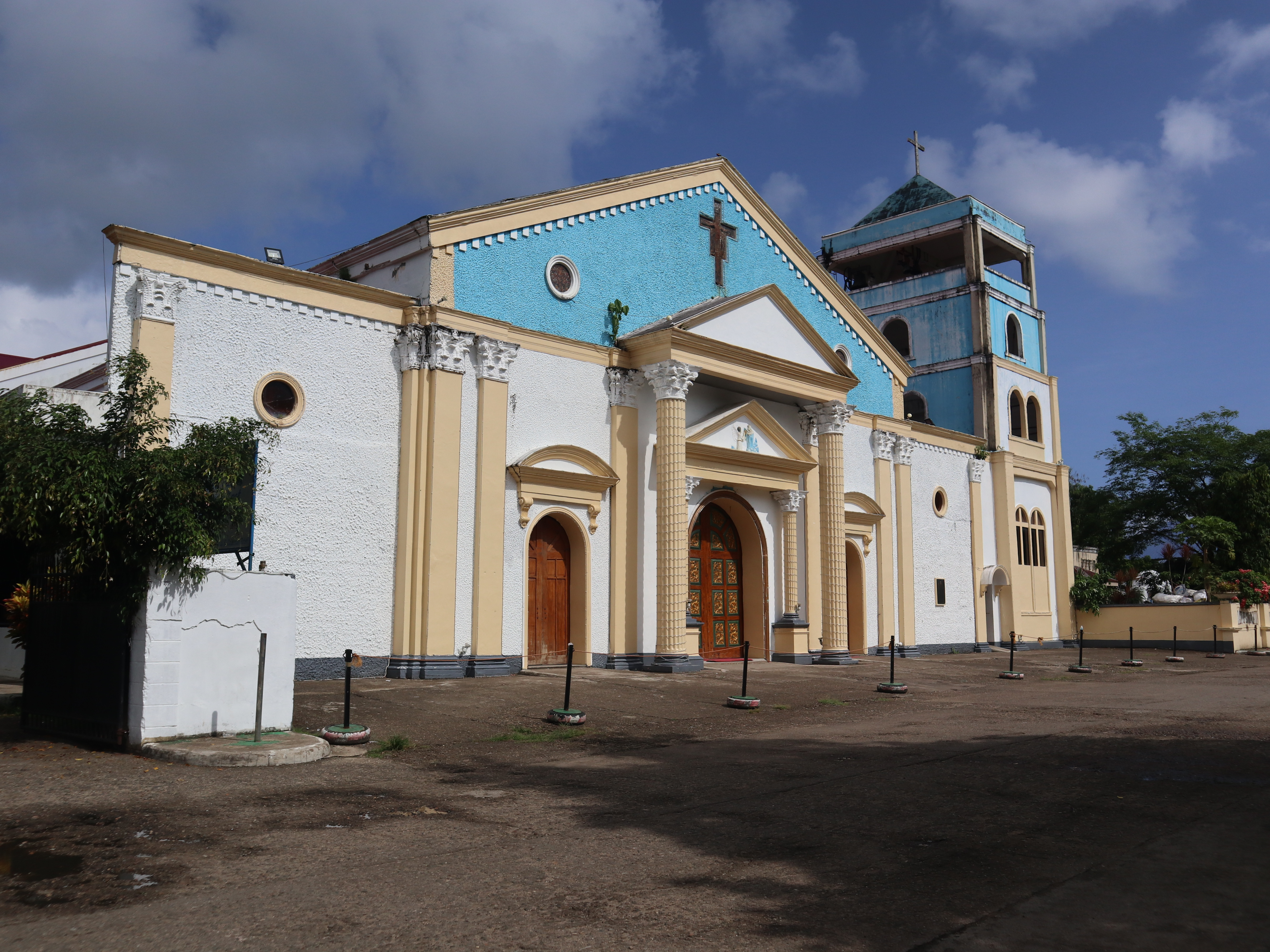
- Catarman Cathedral

- Coat of arms

Location
- Country: Philippines
- Territory: Northern Samar
- Ecclesiastical province: Palo

Statistics
- Area: 3,498 km^{2} (1,351 sq mi)
- Population: Total; Catholics: (as of 2021); 666,659; 625,384 (93.8%)
- Parishes: 31

Information
- Denomination: Catholic Church
- Sui iuris church: Latin Church
- Rite: Roman Rite
- Established: December 5, 1974
- Cathedral: Cathedral of Our Lady of the Annunciation
- Secular priests: 51

Current leadership
- Pope: Leo XIV
- Bishop: Nolly C. Buco
- Metropolitan Archbishop: John F. Du

The Diocese of Catarman (Lat: Dioecesis Catarmaniensis) is a Latin Church ecclesiastical jurisdiction or diocese of the Catholic Church in the Philippines.

Erected in 1974, the diocese was a suffragan in the ecclesiastical province of the metropolitan Archdiocese of Cebu. Upon Palo's elevation in 1982, Catarman was reassigned to the new archdiocese as its suffragan. The Diocese of Catarman has experienced no jurisdictional changes since its establishment.

Nolly Buco, a former auxiliary bishop of the Roman Catholic Diocese of Antipolo, was initially appointed as apostolic administrator by Pope Francis when Bishop Emmanuel Trance retired as bishop of the diocese on December 8, 2023. Trance is from Calinog, Iloilo under the Archdiocese of Jaro. On October 16, 2024, Pope Francis subsequently appointed him as the third bishop of Catarman; he was installed on January 15, 2025.

== Ordinaries ==
No.	Bishop	Period in office	Notes	Coat of arms
1	Angel Tec-i Hobayan	March 11, 1975 – March 10, 2005 (29 years, 364 days)	Retired	
2	Emmanuel Celeste Trance	March 10, 2005 – December 8, 2023 (18 years, 273 days)	Resigned for health reasons	
3	Nolly Camingue Buco	January 15, 2025 – present (1 year, 151 days)		

== See also ==
- Catholic Church in the Philippines
