= 2006 in the Philippines =

- Decades: 1980s; 1990s; 2000s; 2010s; 2020s
- See also: List of years in the Philippines; films

2006 in the Philippines details events of note that happened in the Philippines in the year 2006.

== Incumbents ==
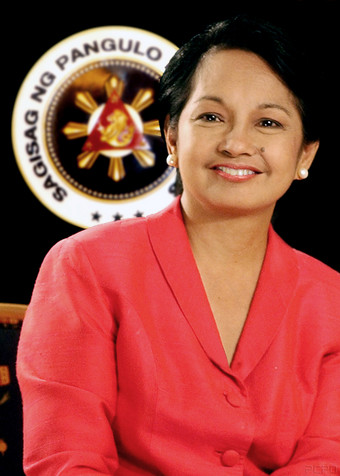
Gloria Macapagal
M. Arroyo

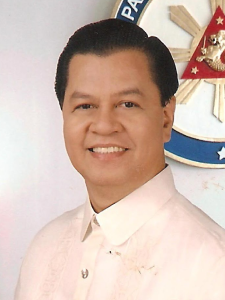
Noli L.
de Castro Jr.

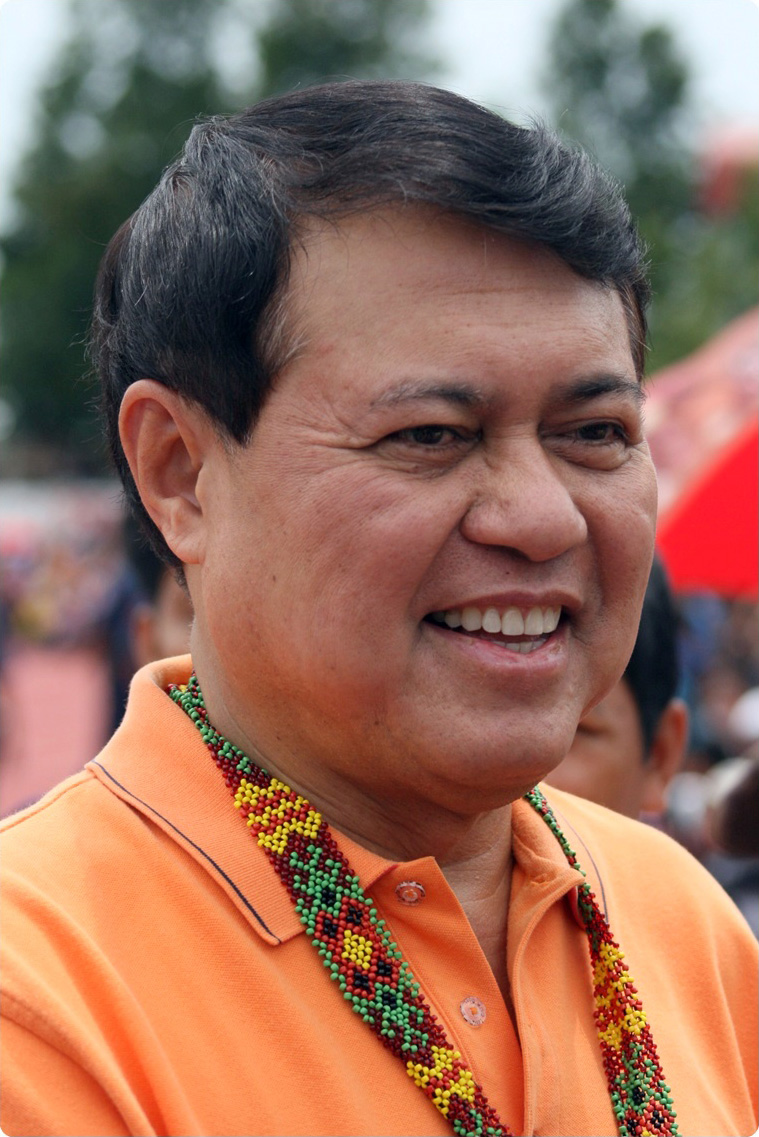
Manny B.
Villar Jr.

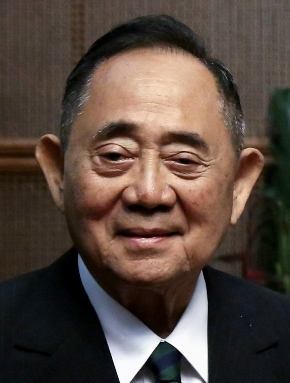
Jose C.
de Venecia Jr.

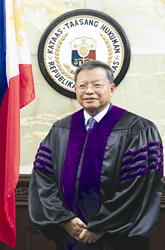
Reynato S.
Puno

- President: Gloria Macapagal Arroyo (Lakas-CMD)
- Vice President: Noli de Castro (Independent)
- Senate President:
  - Franklin Drilon (until July 23)
  - Manuel Villar (from July 24)
- House Speaker: Jose de Venecia
- Chief Justice:
  - Artemio Panganiban (until December 7)
  - Reynato Puno (from December 8)
- Philippine Congress: 13th Congress of the Philippines

== Events ==
=== January ===
- January 27 – Marine Captain Nicanor Faeldon, who escaped from the Philippine Army headquarters on December 14, is recaptured by the Armed Forces of the Philippines (AFP). Faeldon and other junior officers of the AFP launched the Oakwood mutiny on July 27, 2003, where they demanded President Arroyo and then Defense secretary Angelo Reyes to resign.

=== February ===
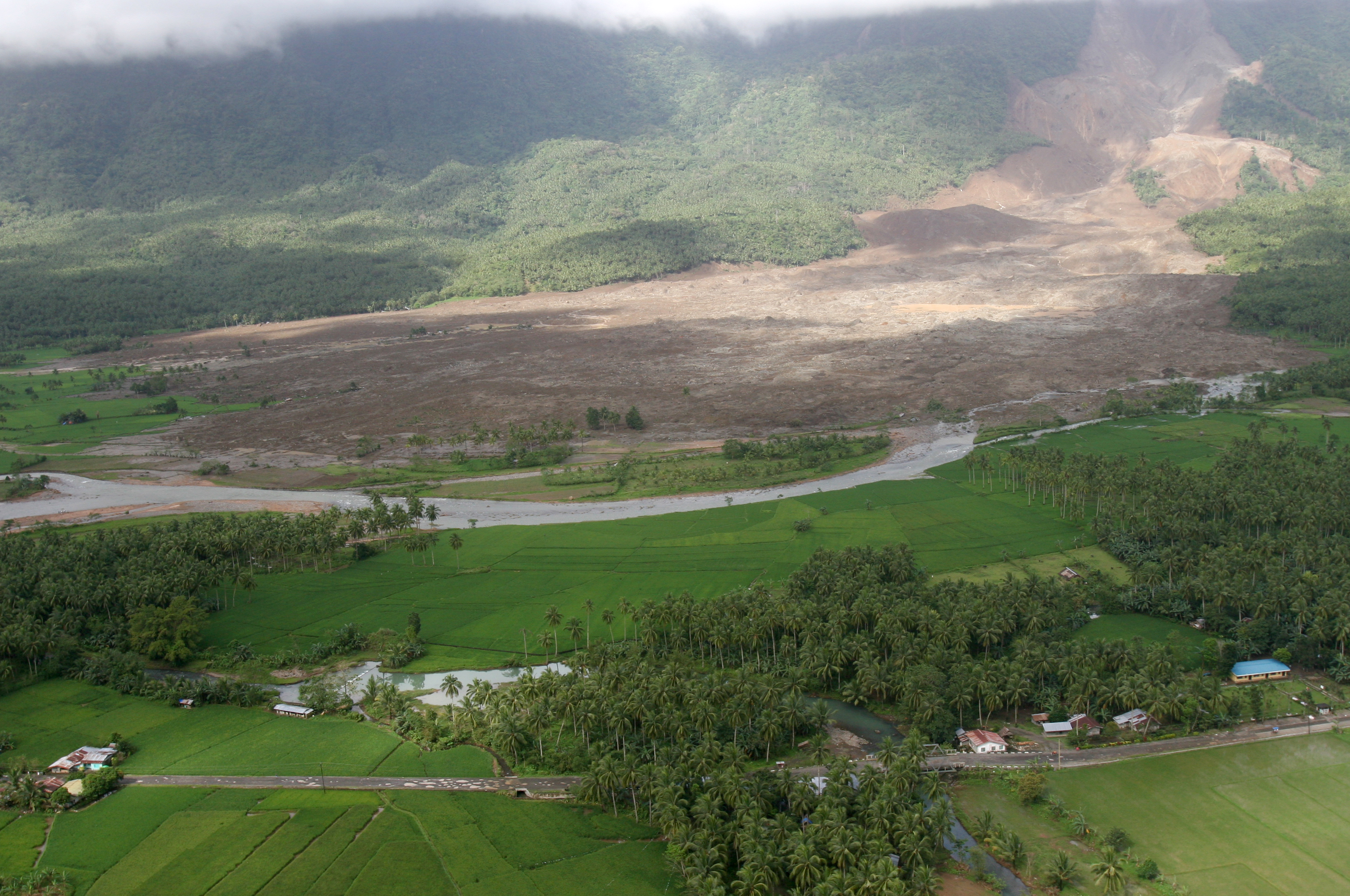
Southern Leyte mudslide

- February 1 – The Revised-Value Added Tax (R-VAT) is implemented, causing a hike in prices of consumer goods.
- February 4 – A stampede occurs during the first anniversary of ABS-CBN's television program Wowowee at the PhilSports Complex, causing the deaths of 74 people and the wounding of about 400 others
- February 17 – After heavy rains in the preceding ten days, a mudslide occurs on the town of Saint Bernard, Southern Leyte, killing 50 people, but with 958 people still missing the death toll is expected to rise dramatically.
- February 24 – President Gloria Macapagal Arroyo on 11:25 am declares a state of emergency via Proclamation No. 1017 after a failed coup attempt and street protests commemorating the 20th anniversary of the People Power Revolution. The protesters converged at the EDSA Shrine led by Vice President Teofisto Guingona were dispersed right after the proclamation. The protesters at EDSA-Santolan led by Prof. Randy David were dispersed violently by the police. Several leftist and rightist leaders were arrested or were under the threat of arrest within the next seven days. The President declared the lifting of the state of emergency via Proclamation No. 1021 on March 3.

=== April ===
- April 20 – The Supreme Court declares that a part of Executive Order No. 464 as unconstitutional, thus paving way for the resumption of Congressional inquiries.
- April 25 – The Supreme Court rules that a part of the government policy of Calibrated Pre-Emptive Response as unconstitutional.

=== May ===
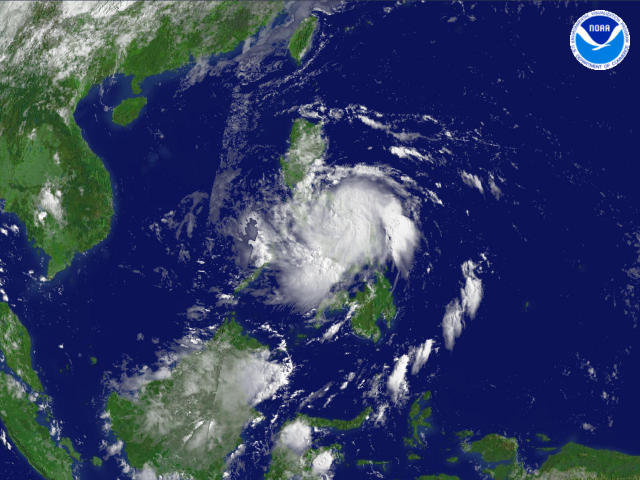
Typhoon Caloy over the Philippines

- May 3 – The Supreme Court rules that the Proclamation No. 1017 was constitutional, although a part of General Order No. 5 as unconstitutional.
- May 11 – Typhoon Caloy (international name: Typhoon Chanchu) landfalls on Samar. On the next day, it landfalls on Mindoro. Caloy caused the deaths of 41 and $1.9 million in damages.
- May 18 – Mountaineer Leo Oracion reaches the summit of Mount Everest via the Nepalese side, becoming the first Filipino to do so, although another mountaineer, Dale Abenojar claims that he reached the summit first via the Tibetan side, on May 15.

=== June ===
- June 2 – Four U.S. Marines facing rape charges in the Philippines see their accuser in court for the first time as the formal trial begins in a case that was filed in December, stemming from an incident at a Subic Bay bar. The case has prompted protests and calls for the Visiting Forces Agreement to be amended or scrapped. (Reuters)
- June 3 – The deaths of three Philippines soldiers by the communist New People's Army is confirmed. The ambush by NPA guerrillas took place in Balbalan, Kalinga. The NPA also says two more government soldiers were killed and four were wounded in another attack on an army outpost in Pinukpuk, but the government could not confirm this. (AFP)
- June 8 – U.S. Navy investigators who looked into rape allegations against four marines in the Philippines are barred by the U.S. embassy from testifying in the trial of the four. The plaintiff's attorney characterised the move as a "clear attempt on the part of the US government, to keep us from getting the evidence that we need and from showing the court the truth." (AFP)
- June 13 – A group calling itself Taong Bayan at Kawal, or Masses and Soldiers, claims for an early-morning bomb blast at a police headquarters in Manila, as well as earlier blasts at Manila office building on June 6, an explosion outside the home of an ally of Gloria Macapagal Arroyo last week and two simultaneous bomb blasts in police stations on June 11. The group denies it was behind a bombing in Lipa City that injured nine people on June 11. (AFP)
- June 19 – 900 villagers are evacuated as Mount Bulusan spews ash at Sorsogon. (Manila Standard)
- June 24 – President Arroyo signs the abrogation of the death penalty law, as stated in Republic Act No. 9346.
- June 26 – The opposition bloc files impeachment charges against President Arroyo.

=== July ===
- July 14 – Mayon Volcano in Albay spews out lava and ash. The Philippine Institute of Volcanology and Seismology raised the alert level from level 1 to level 3, prompting evacuations.
- July 15 – The Professional Regulation Commission admits that there was a leakage of test questions in the June 2006 Nurses Licensure Examination.
- July 24:
  - Senator Manuel Villar is elected as the new Senate President, replacing Franklin Drilon at the resumption of the regular session of Congress.
  - President Arroyo suspends classes in Metro Manila and other areas due to Typhoon Glenda (international codename: Kaemi).
  - On her State of the Nation Address, President Arroyo proposes for the creation of five new super regions, and pushes for constitutional change, among others.

=== August ===
- August 7 – Mayon Volcano intensifies its volcanic activity, leading the Philippine Institute of Volcanology and Seismology to raise the alert level from level 3 to level 4, which prompted mandatory evacuation procedures.
- August 11 – An oil spill off the coast of Guimaras occurs, causing widespread environmental damage.
- August 16 – The administration block at the Judicial Committee of the House of Representatives junks the last impeachment case against President Arroyo.
- August 24 – The House of Representatives plenary junked the impeachment case against President Arroyo, voting 173–32.
- August 31 – The petition of Sigaw ng Bayan group for a people's initiative for amendments in the constitution is trashed by the Commission on Elections on the basis that there was no enabling law.

=== September ===
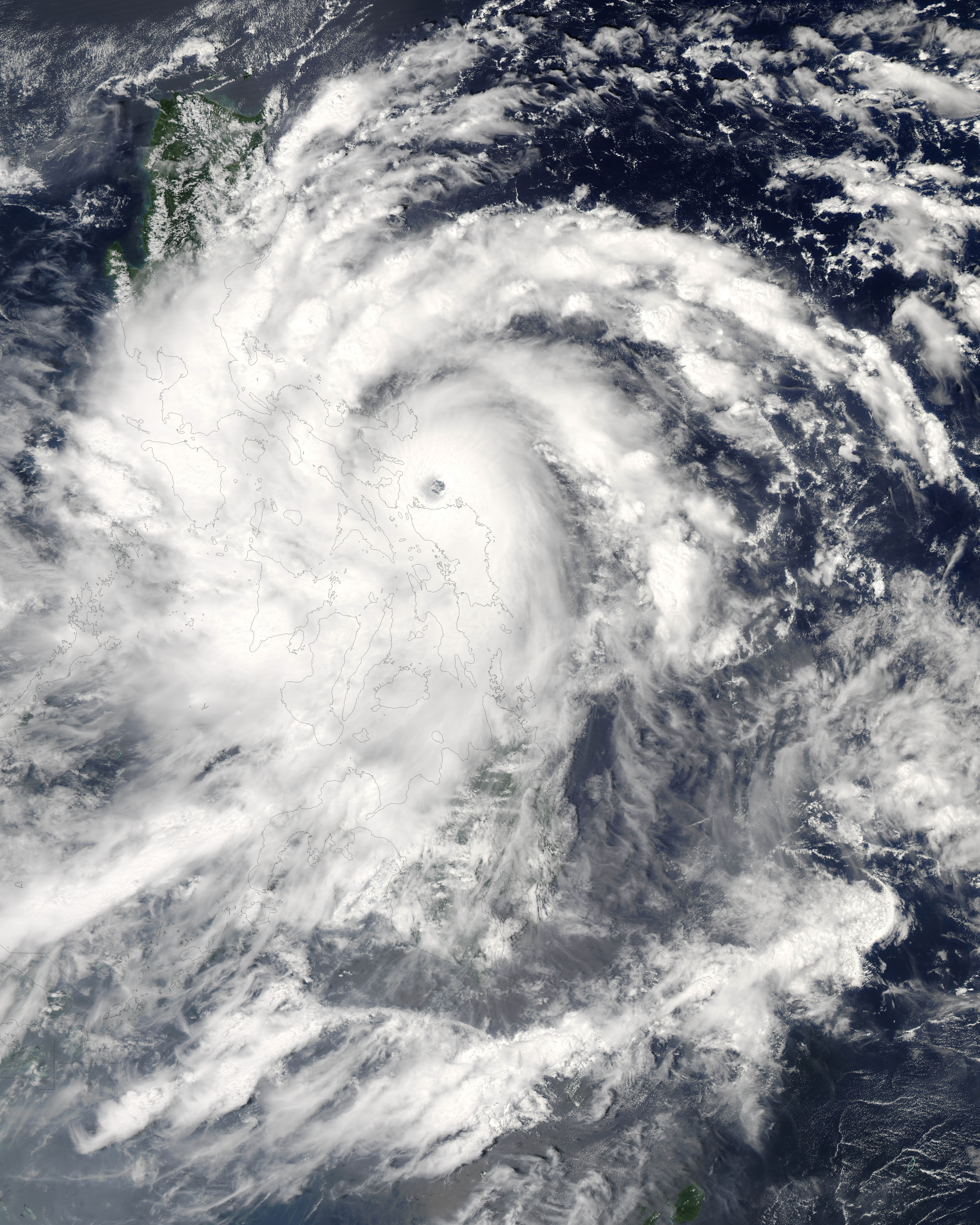
Typhoon Milenyo (Xangsane) shortly before landfall on Samar Island.

- September 28 – Typhoon Milenyo (international name: Typhoon Xangsane) causes widespread damage throughout Luzon, causing at least two deaths, destruction to property, suspension of classes and the Metrorail, closing down of government offices, suspension of trading at the Philippine Stock Exchange, the paralyzation of the South Luzon Expressway, cancellation of flights at Ninoy Aquino International Airport and a Luzon-wide blackout.

=== October ===
- October 10 – At least six people were killed in a bombing at Makilala, Cotabato during the town fiesta. Earlier in the day, a blast wounded at least four people at Tacurong City.
- October 17 – Supporters of Mayor Jejomar Binay of Makati barricade themselves at the front of city hall as the Department of the Interior and Local Government hands out their suspension order against the Mayor, Vice Mayor and seven councilors.
- October 25 – The Supreme Court, voting 8–7, junks the petition of the Sigaw ng Bayan (Shout of the People) group for a people's initiative in the constitution.
- October 31 – Voters in Maguindanao's 29 municipalities have approved the creation of a new province to be composed of 10 towns, named Shariff Kabunsuan. It became the Philippines’ 80th province and the sixth in the Autonomous Region in Muslim Mindanao.

=== November ===
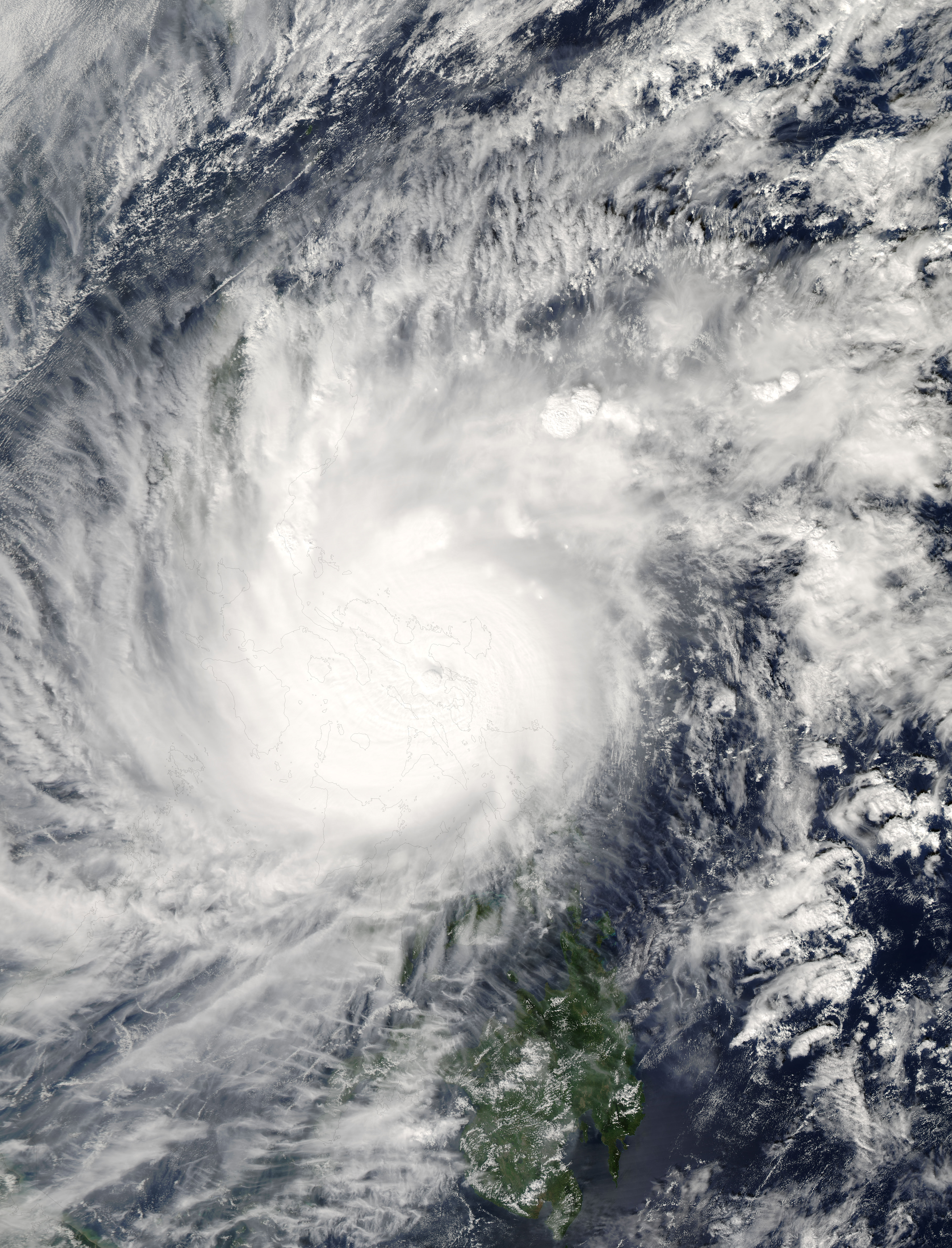
Super typhoon Reming over Bicol.

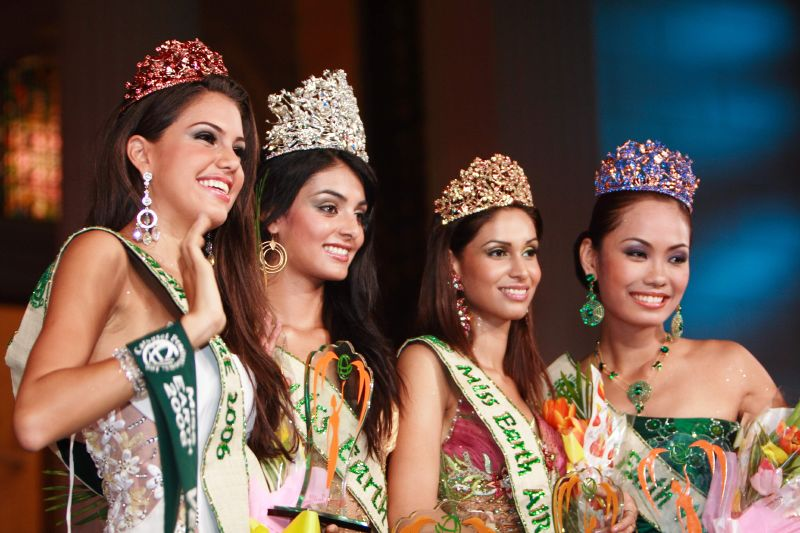
Marianne Puglia (Miss Earth Fire 2006), Hil Hernández (Miss Earth 2006), Amruta Patki (Miss Earth Air 2006), Catherine Untalan (Miss Earth Water 2006)

- November 26 – Miss Earth 2006 beauty pageant is hosted in the Philippines at the National Museum Grounds at Manila. Miss Chile wins the pageant.
- November 29 – The House of Representatives loosens it rules on amending the Constitution.

=== December ===
- December 1 – Albay declares a state of calamity has Typhoon Reming causes 198 deaths and counting.
- December 3 – President Gloria Macapagal Arroyo declares a "state of national calamity" as 406 perished after Typhoon Reming (international name: Typhoon Durian) caused several mudslides around Mayon Volcano.
- December 4 – U.S. Marine Daniel Smith is found guilty in the Subic rape case; Three other U.S. Marines are acquitted.
- December 7 – The House of Representatives passes a resolution calling for a Constituent Assembly, without a concurrent resolution of the Senate.

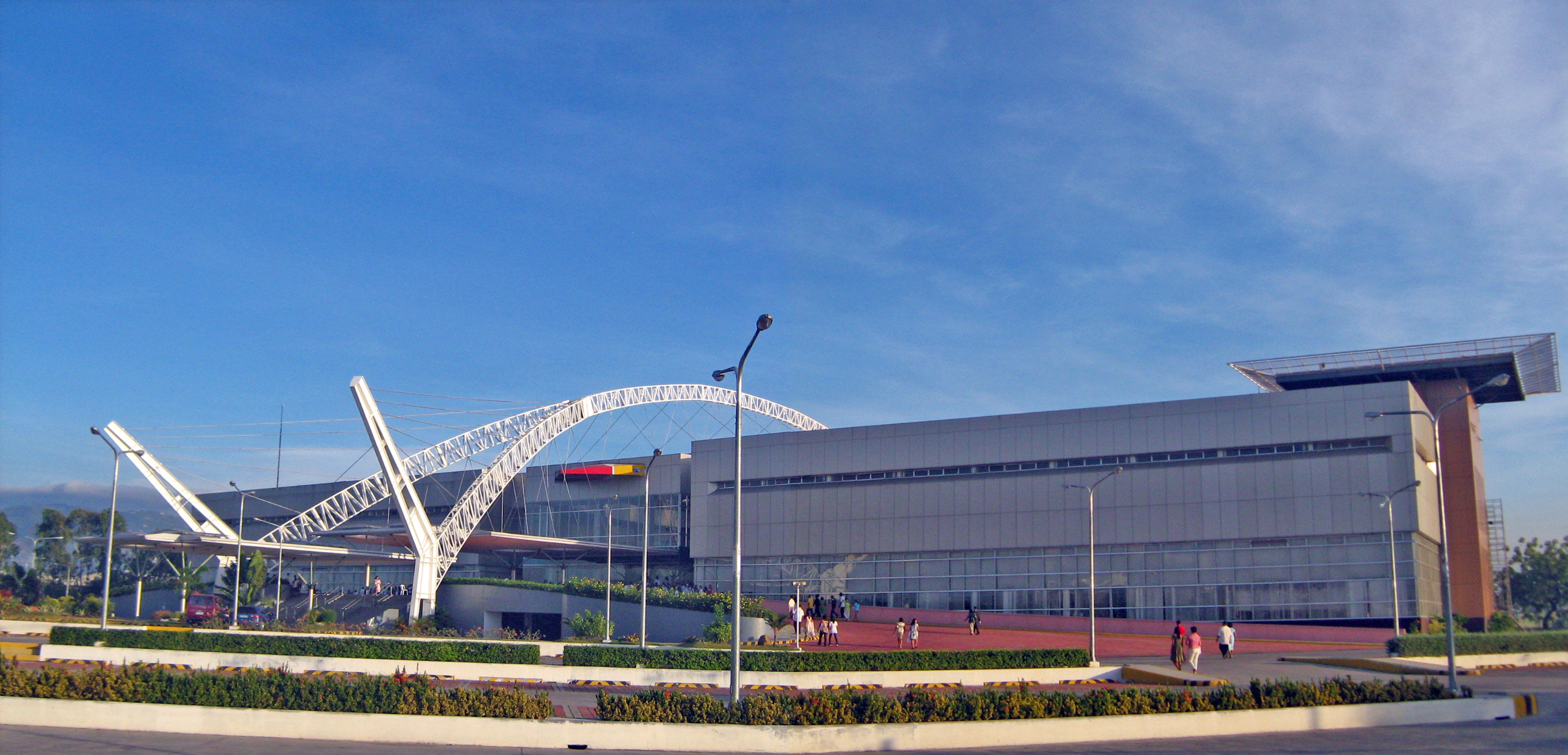
The Cebu International Convention Center, the venue of the 12th ASEAN Summit.

- December 8:
  - Due to Typhoon Seniang (international name: Utor) threatens Cebu, the 12th ASEAN Summit is postponed.
  - Dinagat Islands becomes the 81st province after the voters approved its secession from Surigao del Norte.
- December 10 – Meycauayan becomes a component city in the province of Bulacan through ratification of Republic Act 9356.
- December 12 – The House of Representatives backtracks on its plans for a constituent assembly and instead pushed for a constitutional convention.
- December 13 – The National Disaster Coordinating Council revises the death tolls for Typhoon Reming, with 720 dead, 2,360 injured and 762 missing persons.
- December 16 – Abra Representative Luis Bersamin Jr. is gunned down during a wedding ceremony at Quezon City.
- December 27 – Khadaffy Janjalani's remains are recovered near Patikul, Sulu, by the Philippine military.
- December 30 – Convicted American serviceman Lance Corporal Daniel Smith is freed from a Makati jail late evening Friday and transferred to the US Embassy on orders of the Philippine government.

== Holidays ==
On November 13, 2002, Republic Act No. 9177 declares Eidul Fitr as a regular holiday. The EDSA Revolution Anniversary was proclaimed since 2002 as a special non-working holiday. Note that in the list, holidays in bold are "regular holidays" and those in italics are "nationwide special days".

- January 1 – **New Year's Day**
- February 25 – EDSA Revolution Anniversary
- April 9 – **Araw ng Kagitingan** (Day of Valor)
- April 13 – **Maundy Thursday**
- April 14 – **Good Friday**
- May 1 – **Labor Day**
- June 12 – **Independence Day**
- August 21 – Ninoy Aquino Day
- August 27 – **National Heroes Day**
- October 23 – **Eidul Fitr**
- November 1 – All Saints Day
- November 30 – **Bonifacio Day**
- December 25 – **Christmas Day**
- December 30 – **Rizal Day**
- December 31 – Last Day of the Year

In addition, several other places observe local holidays, such as the foundation of their town. These are also "special days."

== Sports ==
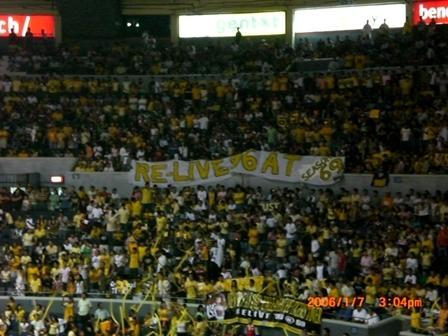
The UST crowd on the UAAP championship game.

The San Beda Little Indians during their halftime presentation at the seniors' basketball finals.

- January 21, Boxing – Manny Pacquiao defeated Mexican Erik Morales in a tenth-round technical knockout at the Thomas & Mack Center, Las Vegas. The victory caused jubilation in the country wracked by poverty and political instability.
- February 19, Basketball – Red Bull Barako wins the Philippine Basketball Association 2005–06 Fiesta Conference after defeating the Purefoods Chunkee Giants in six games.
- February 24–25, Wrestling – The World Wrestling Entertainment RAW Live Tour made its stop at Araneta Coliseum, featuring matches for the WWE Championship, the WWE Intercontinental Championship, and the WWE Women's Championship, among others. John Cena, Shelton Benjamin and Trish Stratus retained their title belts on the two-night event amidst an overflowing crowd at the Araneta Coliseum.
- July 2, Boxing – Manny Pacquiao wins a 12-round unanimous decision over Mexican Óscar Larios in front of his hometown fans at the Araneta Coliseum.
- July 21, Basketball – The Purefoods Chunkee Giants defeated the Red Bull Barako at the Philippine Basketball Association 2006 Philippine Cup Finals, 4–2 at the Araneta Coliseum.
- August 19, Softball – A Junior League softball team from Bacolod was beaten by a team from Naples, Florida, 8–0, at the Junior League World Series held at Kirkland, Washington
- September 11, Billiards – Efren Reyes wins the World 8-Ball Open Championship at Reno, Nevada, beating Rodney Morris, 8–6.
- September 22, Collegiate Basketball – San Beda College win the 82nd NCAA seniors' basketball tournament, beating the Philippine Christian University (PCU). San Sebastian College-Recoletos defeated the PCU High School to win the juniors' championship.
- October 2, Collegiate Basketball – The University of Santo Tomas defeated the Ateneo de Manila University, 76–74, in overtime, at the deciding third game of the 69th UAAP men's basketball tournament. Their women's counterpart won the Women's championship while the Ateneo juniors team won the Juniors championship.
- October 21–22, Wrestling – The WWE SmackDown! Survivor Series Tour makes it stop at the Araneta Coliseum.
- November 12, Billiards – Pool player Ronato Alcano defeated Ralf Souquet in the 2006 WPA Men's World Nine-ball Championship in Pasay, 17 racks to 11.
- November 18, Boxing – Manny Pacquiao knocked out Erik Morales at their boxing bout held at the Thomas & Mack Center, Las Vegas. (AP via Yahoo! Sports)

== Television ==
- December 10 – Mau Marcelo was declared the first Philippine Idol at the final results show was held in the Araneta Coliseum. (INQ7.net)

== Births ==
- January 19 – JB Agustin, actor, socialite, and philanthropist
- January 27 – Niana Guerrero, dancer
- February 8 – Emman Atienza, social media personality (d. 2025)
- April 10 – Sofia Pablo, actress
- May 3 – Mutya Orquia, actress
- May 14 – Fyang, social media influencer, model, and actress
- June 23 – CX Navarro, actor
- August 5 – James Graham, actor
- November 3 – Natalie Oca, football player
- December 12 – Kai Montinola, actress, singer, and model

== Deaths ==
- January 2 – Cecilia Muñoz-Palma, Supreme Court Associate Justice and Constitutional Commission president (b. 1914)
- January 23 – Ernie Baron, television journalist, host, and inventor (b. 1940)
- January 29 – Andrew Gonzalez, educator and linguist (b. 1940)
- February 4 – Rosa del Rosario, actress (b. 1917)
- February 14 – Ramon Bagatsing, longest serving Mayor of Manila from 1971 to 1986, Plaza Miranda bombing survivor (b. 1916)
- April 23 – Chat Silayan, actress and former beauty queen (b. 1960)
- May 2 – Tonette Lopez, Filipino activist
- June 1 – Mariano Yogore, Filipino microbiologist (b. 1921)
- September 4 – Khadaffy Janjalani, Filipino Islamist (b. 1975)
- September 18 – Eddie Mercado, television host (b. 1938)
- September 19 – Conrado M. Vasquez, Supreme Court Associate Justice and Ombudsman (b. 1913)
- October 3 – Alberto Ramento, bishop of the Philippine Independent Church (b. 1937)
- October 7 – Dan Campilan, television journalist (b. 1980)
- November 2 – Rafael Donato, educator and linguist (b. 1938)
- November 24 – Maximo V. Soliven, newspaper journalist and publisher (b. 1933)
- November 29 – Victoria Quirino-Delgado, acted as First Lady of the Philippines during term of her widowered father (b. 1929)
- November 30 – Rafael Buenaventura, former governor of the Bangko Sentral ng Pilipinas (b. 1938)
- December 20 – Ben Arda, Filipino professional golfer (b. 1929)
- December 21 – Ramon Obusan, choreographer, National Artist for Dance (b. 1938)
