= 1941 in the Philippines =

- Decades: 1920s; 1930s; 1940s; 1950s; 1960s
- See also: List of years in the Philippines; films

1941 in the Philippines details events of note that happened in the Philippines in 1941.

== Incumbents ==
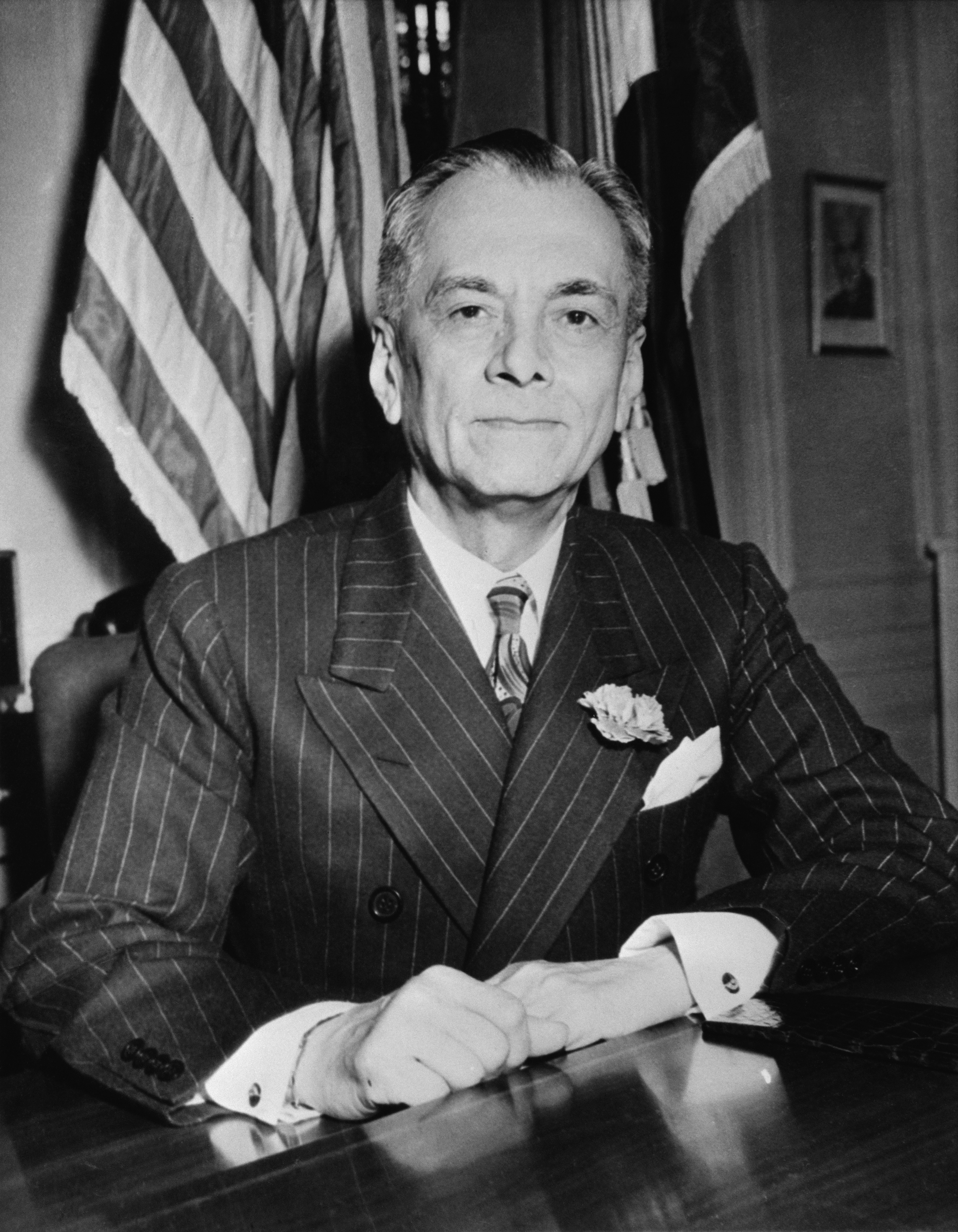
President Manuel Quezon

- President: Manuel Quezon (Nacionalista Party)
- Vice President: Sergio Osmeña (Nacionalista Party)
- Chief Justice:
  - Ramón Avanceña (until December 24)
  - José Abad Santos (starting December 24)
- Philippine National Assembly: 2nd National Assembly of the Philippines (until December 16)

== Events ==
=== March ===
- March 30 – San Pablo becomes a city in the province of Laguna through Commonwealth Act 520 which was approved on May 7, 1940.

=== November ===
- November 11 – Manuel Quezon is re-elected as president in the Presidential elections.

=== December ===
- December 8 – Start of the Japanese Invasion of the Philippines.
- December 20 – President Quezon, his family and the war cabinet move to Corregidor Island.
- December 26 – General MacArthur declares Manila an open city.
- December 28 – Filipino and US armies retreat to Bataan.
- December 30 – Manuel Quezon takes his oath of Office at the Corregidor Island.

== Holidays ==
As per Act No. 2711 section 29, issued on March 10, 1917, any legal holiday of fixed date falls on Sunday, the next succeeding day shall be observed as legal holiday. Sundays are also considered legal religious holidays. Bonifacio Day was added through Philippine Legislature Act No. 2946. It was signed by then-Governor General Francis Burton Harrison in 1921. On October 28, 1931, the Act No. 3827 was approved declaring the last Sunday of August as National Heroes Day.

- January 1 – New Year's Day
- February 22 – Legal Holiday
- April 10 – Maundy Thursday
- April 11 – Good Friday
- May 1 – Labor Day
- July 4 – Philippine Republic Day
- August 13 – Legal Holiday
- August 31 – National Heroes Day
- November 27 – Thanksgiving Day
- November 30 – Bonifacio Day
- December 25 – Christmas Day
- December 30 – Rizal Day

== Births ==
- February 19 – Francisco Feliciano, national artist for music (d. 2014)
- February 23 – Lucita Soriano, TV and movie actress (d. 2015)
- March 4 – Haydee Yorac, public servant, law professor and politician (d. 2005)
- March 20 – Raul del Mar, politician (d. 2020)
- March 31 – Johnny Midnight, radio broadcaster (d. 2014)
- June 19 – Conchita Carpio-Morales, lawyer and jurist, Ombudsman of the Philippines
- June 25 – Oliver Ongtawco, bowler (d. 2020)
- July 14 – Jun Papa, olympic basketball player (d. 2005)
- July 28 – Susan Roces, actress (d. 2022)
- September 10 – Ruben Torres, activist and politician
- September 23 - Ric Manrique Jr., Kundiman Singer (d. 2017)
- October 26 – Raul Roco, senator, and presidential candidate (d. 2005)
- November 8 - Former Capt. Panifilo Villaruel, A former pilot who killed in NAIA Takeover (d. 2003)
- December 4 – Lou Salvador Jr., film actor (d. 2008)
