= 2007 in the Philippines =

- Decades: 1980s; 1990s; 2000s; 2010s; 2020s
- See also: List of years in the Philippines; films

2007 in the Philippines details events of note that happened in the Philippines in the year 2007.

== Incumbents ==
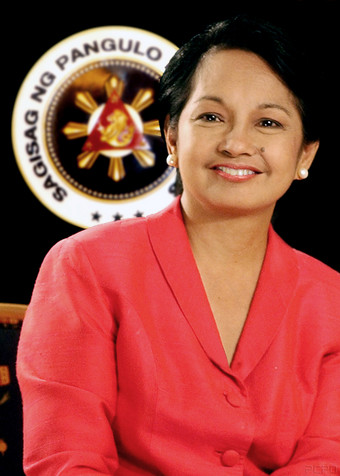
Gloria Macapagal
M. Arroyo

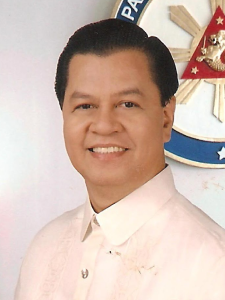
Noli L.
de Castro Jr.

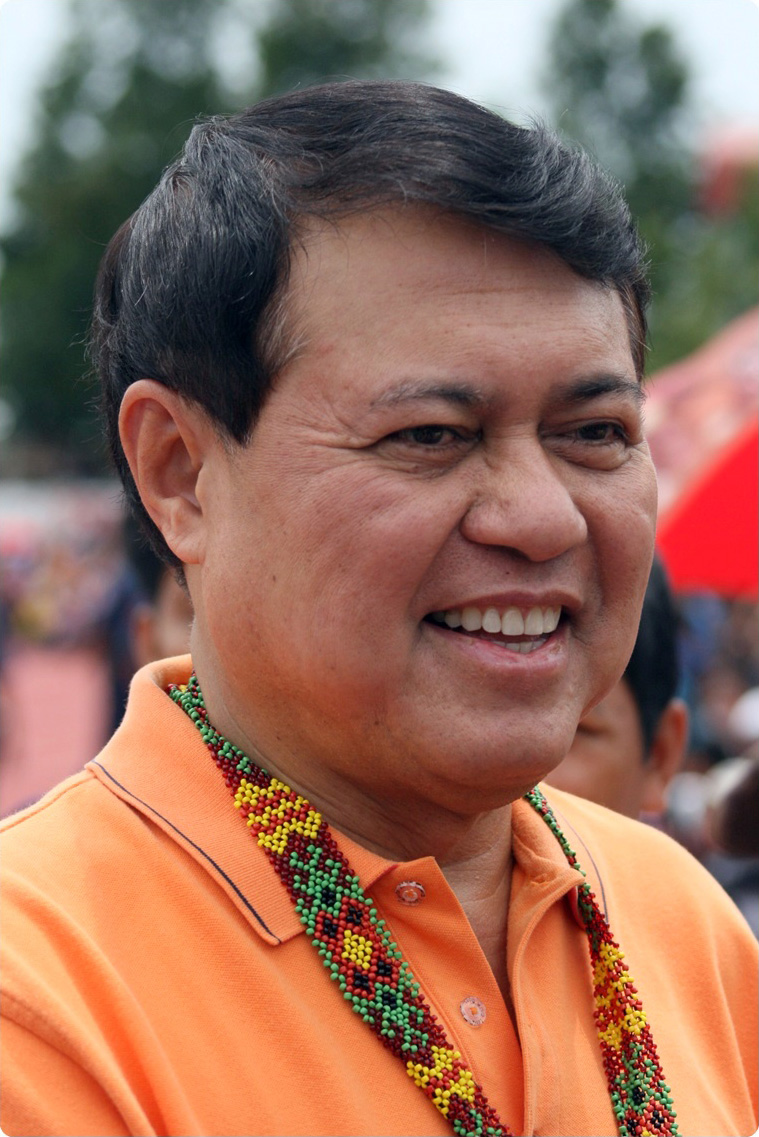
Manny B.
Villar Jr.

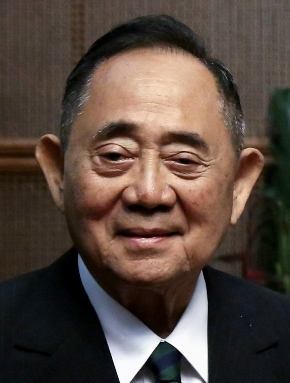
Jose C.
de Venecia Jr.

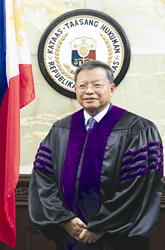
Reynato S.
Puno

- President: Gloria Macapagal Arroyo (Lakas-CMD)
- Vice President: Noli de Castro (Independent)
- Senate President: Manuel Villar
- House Speaker: Jose de Venecia
- Chief Justice: Reynato Puno
- Philippine Congress:
  - 13th Congress of the Philippines (until June 8)
  - 14th Congress of the Philippines (starting July 23)

== Events ==
=== January ===
- January 13 – 12th ASEAN Summit is held in Mandaue City.

=== March ===
- March 28 – In Manila, a hostage crisis took place in front of Manila City Hall where an armed civil engineer Armando 'Jun' Ducat and an accomplice, Cesar Carbone took hostage of 26 day-care students and 4 teachers from Musmos Daycare Center (owned by the hostage-taker), who demanded the government to provide free education to daycare students and housing for their families in Parola Compound in Tondo, Manila. The hostage ended with the release of all hostages.

=== May ===
- May 14 – Synchronized national and local elections are held.
- May 15 – Five unidentified gunmen entered an elementary school in Taysan, Batangas and set a polling area on fire, killing two people and injuring nine others.

=== June ===
- June 5 – The League of Cities of the Philippines files for urgent motion for issuance of writs of preliminary injunction and/or a temporary restraining order (TRO) to the Supreme Court for the pending plebiscites of the 12 municipalities: Baybay, Leyte; Catbalogan, Samar; Tandag, Surigao del Sur, Tayabas, Quezon; Tabuk, Kalinga; Bayugan, Agusan del Sur; Batac, Ilocos Norte and Guihulngan, Negros Oriental.
- June 16
  - San Juan becomes a highly urbanized city in Metro Manila through ratification of Republic Act 9388.
  - Baybay becomes a component city in the province of Leyte through ratification of Republic Act 9389.
  - Bogo becomes a component city in the province of Cebu through ratification of Republic Act 9390.
  - Catbalogan becomes a component city in the province of Samar through ratification of Republic Act 9391.
- June 18
  - Lamitan becomes a component city in the province of Basilan through ratification of Republic Act 9393.
  - Mati becomes a component city in the province of Davao Oriental through ratification of Republic Act 9408.
- June 20
  - Borongan becomes a component city in the province of Eastern Samar through ratification of Republic Act 9394.
  - Bayugan becomes a component city in the province of Agusan del Sur through ratification of Republic Act 9405.
- June 23
  - Tandag becomes a component city in the province of Surigao del Sur through ratification of Republic Act 9392.
  - Tabuk becomes a component city in the province of Kalinga through ratification of Republic Act 9404 .
  - Batac becomes a component city in the province of Ilocos Norte through ratification of Republic Act 9407.
- June 24 – Navotas becomes a highly urbanized city in Metro Manila through ratification of Republic Act 9387.
- June 27 – El Salvador becomes a component city in the province of Misamis Oriental through ratification of Republic Act 9438.

=== July ===
- July 1 – Carcar becomes a component city in the province of Cebu through ratification of Republic Act 9436.
- July 11 – Fourteen members of the Philippine Marines were found beheaded after an encounter against Islamic rebels in the province of Basilan.
- July 14
  - Guihulngan becomes a component city in the province of Negros Oriental through ratification of Republic Act 9409.
  - Tayabas becomes a component city in the province of Quezon through ratification of Republic Act 9398.
- July 27 – The Department of Agriculture declares an outbreak of hog cholera at the provinces of Pampanga and Bulacan.
- July 28 – Cabadbaran becomes a component city in the province of Agusan del Norte through ratification of Republic Act 9434.

=== August ===
- August 28 – Exiled Communist Party of the Philippines founding chairman Jose Maria Sison is arrested at Utrecht, Netherlands.

=== September ===
- September 2 – Naga becomes a component city in the province of Cebu through ratification of Republic Act 9491.
- September 12 – The Sandiganbayan convicts former president Joseph Estrada for plunder and sentence him to reclusion perpetua while acquitting him and his co-accused on other charges.

=== October ===
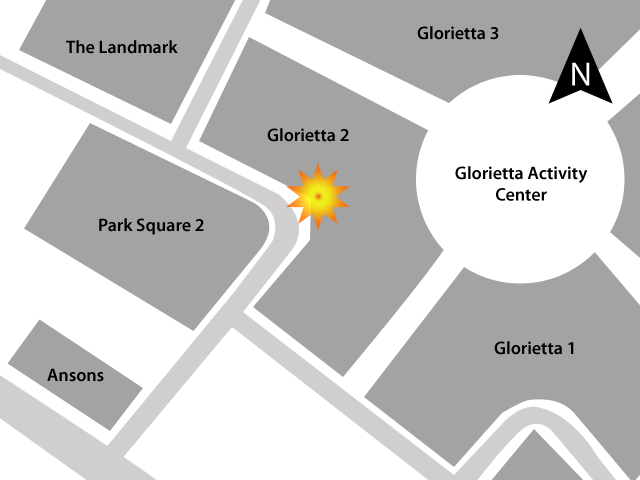
Glorietta 2 Mall Bombing Map

- October 19 – An explosion at the Glorietta mall in Makati kills 11 and injures at over a hundred.
- October 25 – Former President Joseph Estrada is pardoned and free from jail after his trial.
- October 29 – Philippines starts the barangay and Sangguniang Kabataan elections.

=== November ===
- November 13 – An explosion at the Philippine House of Representatives building in Quezon City kills four people, including Congressman Wahab Akbar.
- November 29 – The Armed Forces of the Philippines lays siege to The Peninsula Manila after soldiers led by Senator Antonio Trillanes IV stage a mutiny.

== Holidays ==
On November 13, 2002, Republic Act No. 9177 declares Eidul Fitr as a regular holiday. The EDSA Revolution Anniversary was proclaimed since 2002 as a special non-working holiday. Note that in the list, holidays in bold are "regular holidays" and those in italics are "nationwide special days".

- January 1 – **New Year's Day**
- February 25 – EDSA Revolution Anniversary
- April 5 – **Maundy Thursday**
- April 6 – **Good Friday**
- April 9 – **Araw ng Kagitingan** (Day of Valor)
- May 1 – **Labor Day**
- May 14 – Election Day
- June 12 – Independence Day
  - Due to the holiday economics policy, the working holiday was on Monday, June 11. Festivities and rites were still held on June 12.
- August 21 – **Ninoy Aquino Day**
- August 26 – **National Heroes Day**
- October 12 – **Eidul Fitr**
- November 1 – All Saints Day
- November 30 – **Bonifacio Day**
- December 25 – **Christmas Day**
- December 30 – **Rizal Day**
- December 31 – Last Day of the Year

In addition, several other places observe local holidays, such as the foundation of their town. These are also "special days."

== Entertainment and culture ==
- March 3 – Anna Theresa Licaros is crowned as Binibining Pilipinas-Universe at the pageant held at the Araneta Coliseum.
- November 11 – Miss Earth 2007 beauty pageant is hosted by the Philippines at the University of the Philippines Theater in Quezon City. Miss Canada wins the pageant.

== Sports ==
- February 4, Golf – Frankie Miñoza wins the 2007 Philippine Open at the Wack Wack Golf and Country Club.
- February 21, Basketball – The International Basketball Federation lifts the national team's suspension as it recognizes the new basketball federation.
- February 24, Basketball – Barangay Ginebra Kings defeated the San Miguel Beermen in the Philippine Cup Finals.
- April 15, Boxing – Manny Pacquiao knocked out Jorge Solis on the eighth round to retain the WBC International Superfeatherweight championship at the Alamodome, San Antonio, Texas.
- July 7, Boxing – In a pair of world championship bouts, Florante Condes beats IBF minimumweight champion Muhammad Rachman in a bout a Jakarta and Nonito Donaire beat the IBF flyweight champion Vic Darchinyan in Bridgeport, Connecticut, United States to become only the two current Filipino world champions.
- July 20, Basketball – The Alaska Aces defeats the Talk N Text Phone Pals to win their 12th Philippine Basketball Association championship in the 2007 PBA Fiesta Conference.
- August 11, Boxing – Gerry Peñalosa knocked out Jhonny González of Mexico to win the WBO Bantamweight Championship at the ARCO Arena, Sacramento, California.
- August 18, Baseball – Players from Makati are beaten by players from Pearl City, Hawaii to lose in the Junior League World Series at Taylor, Michigan.
- September 29, Collegiate Basketball – The De La Salle Junior Archers and the Ateneo Lady Eagles won their respective divisional championships against the Ateneo Blue Eaglets and the UP Lady Maroons.
- October 6, Boxing – Manny Pacquiao defeats Mexican Marco Antonio Barrera via unanimous decision at the Mandalay Bay Resort and Casino, Las Vegas to retain the WBC international super featherweight title.
- October 7, Collegiate Basketball – Basketball team De La Salle Green Archers sweep the UE Red Warriors 2-0 in their final series to win their seventh men's title in the UAAP.

== Births ==
- January 13 – Ashley Sarmiento, actress
- February 12 – Esang de Torres, singer
- February 27 – Lance Lucido, actor
- April 19 – Bimby Aquino Yap, actor
- June 8 – Ariana Markey, football player
- July 16 – Carmelle Collado, singer
- August 1 – Marco Masa, actor
- August 15 – Jael-Marie Guy, football player

== Deaths ==
- January 13 – Gido Babilonia, basketball player (b. 1966)
- January 15 – Pura Santillan-Castrence, writer and diplomat (b. 1905)
- January 16 – Jainal Antel Sali, Jr., Abu Sayyaf leader (b. 1964)
- January 24 – Jose R. Velasco, physiologist and National Scientist (b. 1916)
- February 19 – Antonio Serapio, Congressman from Valenzuela City (b. 1937)
- March 16 – Joey Gosiengfiao, film director (b. 1941)
- March 24 – Jun Bernardino, former Philippine Basketball Association commissioner (b. 1947)
- April 13 – Nicanor Yñiguez, last Speaker of the Regular Batasang Pambansa during Marcos administration (b. 1915)
- May 17 – Cesar "Kuya Cesar" Nucum, radio broadcaster (b. 1938)
- May 18 – Yoyoy Villame, singer and comedian (b. 1938)
- June 2 – Paulo Campos, physician and National Scientist (b. 1921)
- August 27 – Ramon Zamora, actor (b. 1935)
- November 8 – Dulce Quintans-Saguisag, former DSWD Secretary during Estrada administration and wife of ex-Senator Rene Saguisag (b. 1943)
- November 13 – Wahab Akbar, Congressman from Basilan (b. 1960)
- November 16 – Ross Rival a.k.a. Rosauro Salvador, action film actor and father of actress Maja Salvador (b. 1945)
- December 5 – Rene Villanueva, creator and head writer of Batibot (b. 1954)
- December 15 – Ace Vergel, film actor (b. 1952)
- December 22 – Adrian Cristobal, writer and columnist (b. 1932)
