= 1947 in the Philippines =

- Decades: 1920s; 1930s; 1940s; 1950s; 1960s
- See also: List of years in the Philippines; films

1947 in the Philippines details events of note that happened in the Philippines in 1947.

== Incumbents ==
- President: Manuel Roxas (Liberal)
- Vice President: Elpidio Quirino (Liberal)
- Chief Justice: Manuel Moran
- Congress: 1st

== Events ==
=== January ===
- January 28 – President Roxas issues an amnesty proclamation to collaborators.

=== March ===
- March 14:
  - The Treaty of General Relations between Philippines and United States is signed.
  - The Military Bases Agreement is signed between the Philippines and the United States, allowing the latter to retain the use of several military bases for a period of 99 years (until year 2046) but later shortened in 1966 and lapsed in 1991.

=== June ===
- June 20:
  - Dagupan becomes a city in the province of Pangasinan through Republic Act 170 and ratified on the same day.
  - Lipa becomes a city in the province of Batangas through Republic Act 162 and ratified on the same day.
- June 21:
  - Pasay becomes a city (formerly as city of Rizal) in the province of Rizal through Republic Act 183 and ratified on August 16.
  - Ormoc becomes a city in the province of Leyte through Republic Act 179 and ratified on October 20.

=== September ===
- September 8 – The Philippine representative to the Far Eastern Commission, Carlos P. Romulo, signs the Japanese Peace Treaty.

== Holidays ==
As per Act No. 2711 section 29, issued on March 10, 1917, any legal holiday of fixed date falls on Sunday, the next succeeding day shall be observed as legal holiday. Sundays are also considered legal religious holidays. Bonifacio Day was added through Philippine Legislature Act No. 2946. It was signed by then-Governor General Francis Burton Harrison in 1921. On October 28, 1931, the Act No. 3827 was approved declaring the last Sunday of August as National Heroes Day.

- January 1 – New Year's Day
- February 22 – Legal Holiday
- April 3 – Maundy Thursday
- April 4 – Good Friday
- May 1 – Labor Day
- July 4 – Philippine Republic Day
- August 13 – Legal Holiday
- August 31 – National Heroes Day
- November 28 – Thanksgiving Day
- December 25 – Christmas Day
- December 30 – Rizal Day

== Births ==
- January 7 – Angelito Sarmiento, Filipino politician (d. 2015)
- January 9 – Roilo Golez, Filipino politician (d. 2018)
- January 23 – Baldo Marro, Filipino actor (d. 2017)
- January 27 – Perfecto Yasay Jr., Filipino politician (d. 2020)
- January 31 – Laurice Guillen, Filipino actress and director
- February 11 – Johnny Manahan, film and television director
- March 10 – June Keithley, Filipino actress and journalist (d. 2013)
- April 4 – Eliseo Soriano, Filipino televangelist (d. 2021)
- April 5 – Gloria Macapagal Arroyo, 14th president of the Philippines
- April 16 – Nova Villa, Filipino actress and a veteran comedian
- May 9 – Josie Natori, Filipino-born American fashion designer and the CEO and founder of The Natori Company
- May 23 – Maita Gomez, Filipino beauty queen and activist (d. 2012)
- May 24 – Mike de Leon, Filipino film director, cinematographer, scriptwriter and film producer (d. 2025)
- May 31 – Vincent Crisologo, Filipino politician
- June 24 – Romulo T. Dela Cruz, D.D., prelate of the Roman Catholic Church in the Philippines
- June 26 – Raquel Edralin-Tiglao, Filipino activist (d. 2001)
- July 6 – Roy Señeres, Filipino businessman and diplomat (d. 2016)
- August 8 – Snaffu Rigor, composer (d. 2016)
- September 5 – Danny Florencio, Filipino basketball player (d. 2018)
- September 9 – Yoyong Martirez, basketball player, actor, comedian and politician
- September 16 – Bangkay, comedian (d. 2018)
- September 18 – Joe Taruc, radio broadcaster (d. 2017)
- November 9 – Jun Bernardino, former Philippine Basketball Association commissioner. (d. 2007)
- November 27 – Ronaldo Valdez, Filipino film and television actor (d. 2023)
- December 5 – Rudy Fernandez, triathlete
- December 10 – Dick Israel, Filipino actor (d. 2016)
- December 21 – Dimasangcay Pundato, Muslim Filipino former revolutionary leader, undersecretary of the Office of the Presidential Adviser on the Peace Process (d. 2020)
- December 24 – Ricky Belmonte, Filipino actor (d. 2001)
- December 25 – Pepe Smith, Filipino singer-songwriter, drummer and guitarist (d. 2019)

=== Unknown ===
- Ruben Habito
- Cecilia Manguerra Brainard, author and editor of nineteen books

== Deaths ==
- May 14 – Francisco Alonso Liongson (born 1896)
- August 29 – Crispín Oben, Politician (born 1876)
- September 18 – Julian Cruz Balmaceda, Filipino poet, essayist, playwright, novelist, journalist and linguist. (born 1885)
- September 28 – Francisco Santiago, Filipino musician. (born 1889)
- December 20 – Benigno Aquino, Sr., Filipino Politician. (born 1894)

=== Unknown Date ===
- August – Teresa Magbanua, schoolteacher and military leader (born 1868)
- Alejandro Melchor, Filipino civil engineer, mathematician, educator, and member of the Cabinet of the Philippines. (born 1900)
