= 1943 in the Philippines =

- Decades: 1920s; 1930s; 1940s; 1950s; 1960s
- See also: List of years in the Philippines; films

1943 in the Philippines details events of note that happened in the Philippines in the year 1943.

== Incumbents ==
=== Philippine Commonwealth ===
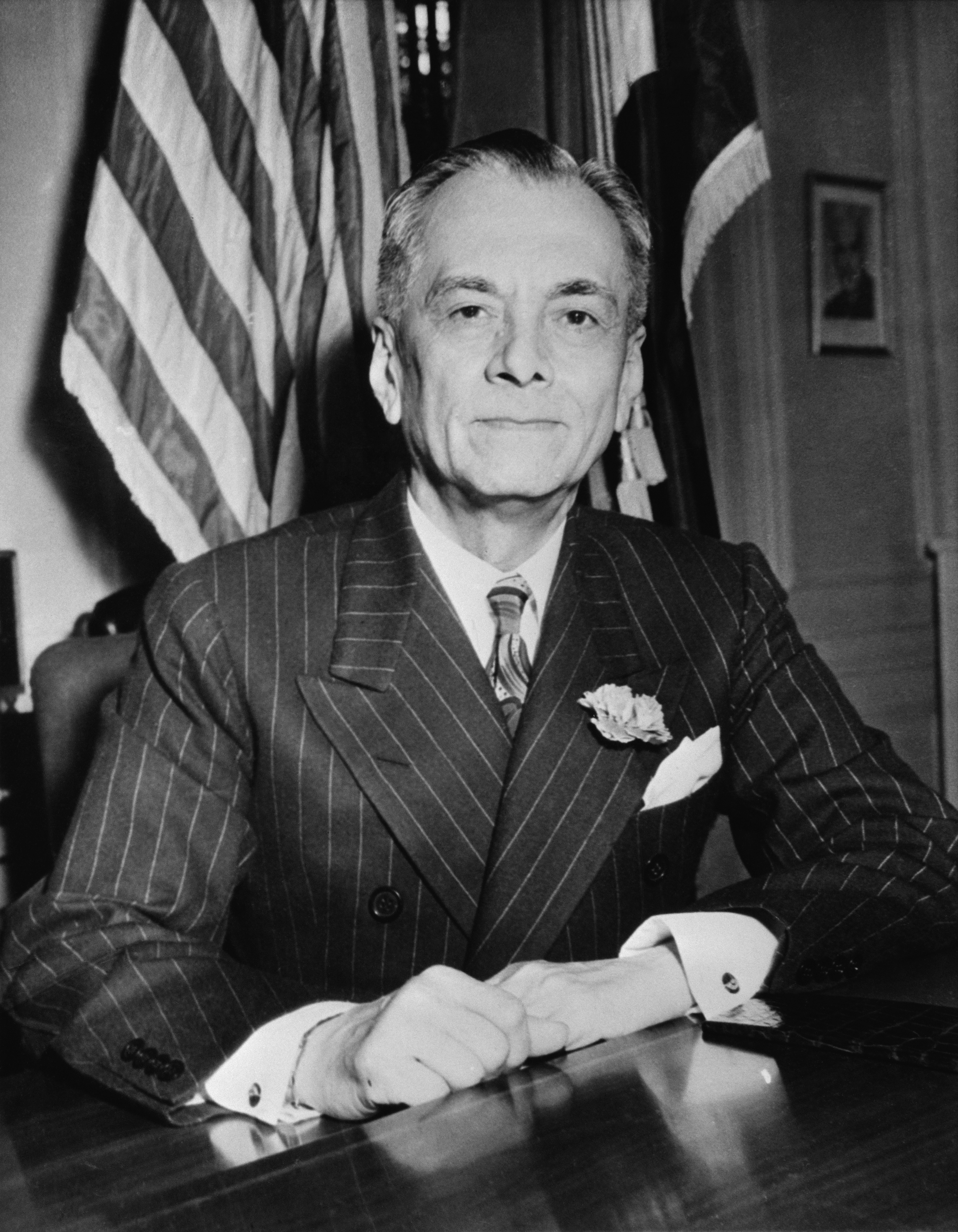
President Manuel Quezon

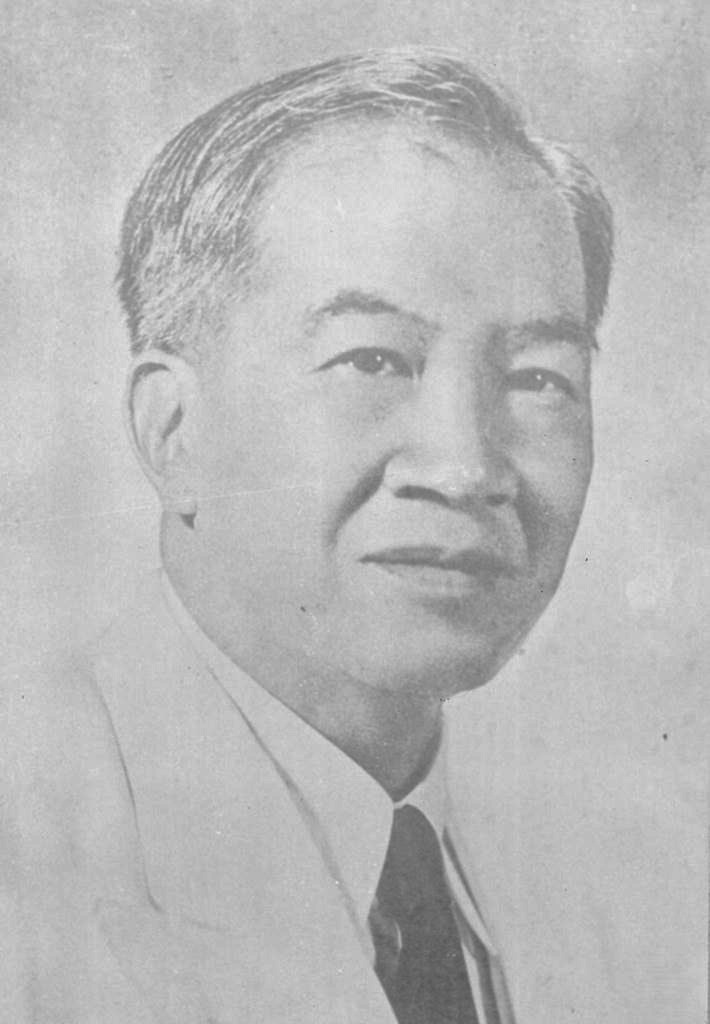
President Jose P. Laurel

- President: Manuel Quezon (Nacionalista Party)
- Vice President: Sergio Osmeña (Nacionalista Party)
- Chief Justice: José Yulo
- Philippine National Assembly: National Assembly

=== Second Philippine Republic ===
- President: José P. Laurel (starting October 14)
- Prime Minister: Jorge B. Vargas (starting October 14)
- Vice President: Benigno Aquino, Sr. (starting October 14)
- Chief Justice: José Yulo

== Events ==
=== May ===
- May 6 – Japanese Prime Minister Hideki Tojo visits the Philippines. A ceremony is held in Luneta in thanksgiving to the great Japanese Empire.
- May 28 – Shigenori Kuroda appointed as Japanese Military Governor (1942–1943)

=== June ===
- June 20 – Japanese Premier Hideki Tojo nominates an all Filipino 20 member Preparatory Commission for Philippine Independence.

=== September ===
- September 4 – The Philippine Preparatory Commission for Independence drafts a new Constitution which provides for a unicameral national assembly.
- September 20 – The 108 delegates to the National Assembly are chosen by the members of the Preparatory Commission for Philippine Independence.
- September 25 – A presidential election is held in the midst of World War II.

=== October ===
- October 14
  - Jose P. Laurel elected President of the Philippines by the National Assembly.
  - The puppet government is inaugurated. Laurel takes his oath of office.

=== November ===
- November – The Philippine economy collapses, the shortage of rice becomes serious.

== Holidays ==
As per Act No. 2711 section 29, issued on March 10, 1917, any legal holiday of fixed date falls on Sunday, the next succeeding day shall be observed as legal holiday. Sundays are also considered legal religious holidays. Bonifacio Day was added through Philippine Legislature Act No. 2946. It was signed by then-Governor General Francis Burton Harrison in 1921. On October 28, 1931, the Act No. 3827 was approved declaring the last Sunday of August as National Heroes Day.

- January 1 – New Year's Day
- February 22 – Legal Holiday
- April 22 – Maundy Thursday
- April 23 – Good Friday
- May 1 – Labor Day
- July 4 – Philippine Republic Day
- August 13 – Legal Holiday
- August 29 – National Heroes Day
- November 25 – Thanksgiving Day
- November 30 – Bonifacio Day
- December 25 – Christmas Day
- December 30 – Rizal Day

== Births ==
- April 3 – Subas Herrero, actor (d. 2013)
- May 4 – Andy Poe, actor and brother of Fernando Poe, Jr. (d. 1995)
- June 8 – Francisco Villaruz, Jr., Filipino justice.
- July 5 – Jojo Lapus, showbiz columnist and screenwriter (d. 2006)
- August 1 – Margarito Teves, secretary of Finance
- August 23 – Boots Plata, Filipino director (d. 2011)
- August 25 – Peque Gallaga, film director, screenwriter and actor (d. 2020)
- August 28 – Norberto Arceo, Filipino cyclist.
- September 5 – Dulce Saguisag, politician and Secretary of Social Welfare and Development (d. 2007)
- September 10 – Júnior (Filipino singer), singer and actor (d. 2014)
- September 11 – Horacio Morales, economist and politician (d. 2012)
- September 12 – Celso Ad. Castillo, film director and screenwriter (d. 2012)
- September 30 – Gemma Cruz-Araneta, politician, writer, director, and beauty queen.
- December 13 – Sergio Osmeña III, politician and senator

== Death ==
- January 10 – Benito Soliven
