= 1946 in the Philippines =

- Decades: 1920s; 1930s; 1940s; 1950s; 1960s
- See also: List of years in the Philippines; films

1946 in the Philippines details events of note that happened in the Philippines in 1946.

== Incumbents ==
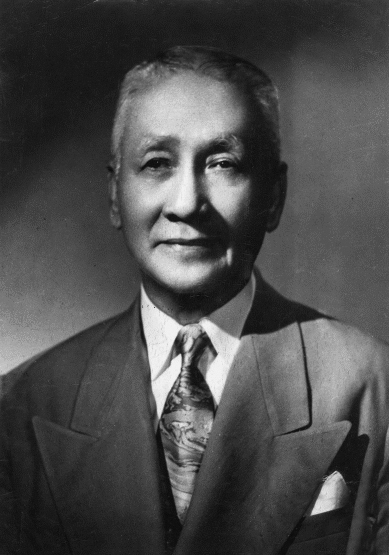
President Sergio Osmeña

- President:
  - Sergio Osmeña (Nacionalista Party) (until May 28)
  - Manuel Roxas (Liberal) (starting May 28)
- Vice President:
  - vacant (until May 28)
  - Elpidio Quirino (Liberal) (starting May 28)
- Chief Justice: Manuel Moran
- Congress: 1st (starting May 25)

== Ongoing events ==
- Independence movement of the Philippines

== Events ==
=== January ===
- January 2 – Walter Hutchinson, special assistant to U.S. Attorney General Thomas Clark, arrives in Manila to deal with his Filipino counterparts on one of the most complex problems in postwar history – collaboration with the Japanese during the war.
- January 5 – Lieutenant Colonel Seicho Ohta, Commander of the Military Police in Manila during the war, is sentenced to death by hanging, as per order from the Fil-American War Crimes Commission.
- January 7 – Reuters reported that the Philippines ordered goods worth ₱1,000,000 a day from the United States. Imports skyrocketed, including textiles, food, and building materials.
- January 11 – For the first time since the creation of the People's Court, a person accused of treason, Felix Española, a 66-year-old Makapili from Bulacan, voluntarily pleaded guilty.
- January 19 – The Liberal wing of the Nacionalista Party holds its convention at the Sta. Ana Cabaret and nominates Manuel Roxas and Elpidio Quirino for president and vice president, respectively.
- January 21 – The Loyalist wing of the Nacionalista Party holds its convention at the Ciro Club, Santa Mesa, Manila, and nominates Sergio Osmeña for president and Eulogio Rodriguez for vice president.
- January 22 – The report of High Commissioner Paul McNutt to President Harry Truman, which lumps the candidates into 'loyalists' and 'enemy collaborators,' created resentment among congressional leaders.
- January 31 – Malacañang announced that President Sergio Osmeña will not campaign. While Roxas tours the country, campaigning, promising, threatening, and cajoling, Osmeña tended to his duties, and placed his faith in the memory and gratitude of his countrymen.

=== February ===
- February 23 – Tomoyuki Yamashita is hanged at Los Baños, Laguna Prison Camp.

=== April ===
- April 23 – Manuel Roxas is elected as the first president of the Third Republic of the Philippines in the presidential elections, as well as the last president (equivalent to governor) of the Commonwealth of the Philippines, defeating incumbent Sergio Osmeña in advance of scheduled independence.
- April 28 – The University of Batangas is founded.

=== June ===
- June 30 – The dissolution of the mainly general headquarters and military camp base of the Philippine Commonwealth Army and Philippine Constabulary located in Manila.

=== July ===
- July 2 – The Philippine Congress accepts the Bell Trade Act, signed by President Roxas.
- July 4:
  - The United States grants the Philippines full independence, marking the official end of American sovereignty and the establishment of the Republic of the Philippines as a self-governing nation.
  - A tree is planted in front of the Manila City Hall as a symbol of independence.
  - President Roxas hosts a formal celebration at the Presidential Palace, followed by a light show presented by United States Navy ships in Manila Bay and a fireworks display outside Intramuros.
- July 5:
  - Philippine sports exhibition is held at the University of Santo Tomas Gymnasium.
  - A Gala Symphony Concert by the Manila Symphony Orchestra, is held at the Rizal Coliseum.
- July 6 – The final event of the week-long celebration of indepdence was a Barrio Fiesta, a traditional dinner feast is held in the evening at the Manila Hotel.

=== September ===
- September 7 – The province of Tayabas changes its name to Quezon under Republic Act 14 in honor of Manuel L. Quezon.
- September 30 – The Amended Tenancy Act is promulgated.

== Holidays ==
As per Act No. 2711 section 29, issued on March 10, 1917, any legal holiday of fixed date falls on Sunday, the next succeeding day shall be observed as legal holiday. Sundays are also considered legal religious holidays. Bonifacio Day was added through Philippine Legislature Act No. 2946. It was signed by then-Governor General Francis Burton Harrison in 1921. On October 28, 1931, the Act No. 3827 was approved declaring the last Sunday of August as National Heroes Day.

- January 1 – New Year's Day
- February 22 – Legal Holiday
- April 18 – Maundy Thursday
- April 19 – Good Friday
- May 1 – Labor Day
- July 4 – Philippine Republic Day
- August 13 – Legal Holiday
- August 25 – National Heroes Day
- November 28 – Thanksgiving Day
- November 30 – Bonifacio Day
- December 25 – Christmas Day
- December 30 – Legal Holiday

== Births ==
- January 9 – Arthur Tugade, businessman, lawyer, and Secretary of Transportation
- January 20:
  - Dong Puno, Lawyer, columnist, TV host
  - Lito Calzado - Filipino actor, director, and choreographer (d. 2011)
- February 19 - Alvarez Isnaji, Filipino politician
- February 22 - Butch Albarracin
- March 5 - Soledad Reyes, distinguished and recognized Philippine literature scholar, literary and art critic, author, anthologist, consultant, professor, instructor, editor, annotator, researcher, and essayist.
- March 8 - Robert Jaworski, Basketball player, Politician
- March 17 - Leandro Mendoza, Filipino politician (d. 2013)
- April - Jaime de los Santos, retired military general in the Philippines.
- April 13 - Antonio del Rosario, Filipino politician
- April 15 - Roberto Roxas, former Filipino cyclist
- May 18 - Ameril Umbra Kato, founder of the Bangsamoro Islamic Freedom Fighters (d. 2015)
- May 19 - Victor Sumulong, politician (d. 2009)
- May 23 - Dado Banatao, Filipino entrepreneur and engineer working in the high-tech industry. (d. 2025)
- June 26 - Orlando S. Mercado, Politician
- July 2 - Monico Puentevella, Politician
- July 4 – Roy Cimatu, Secretary of Environment and Natural Resources
- July 14 - Manuel V. Pangilinan, Filipino businessman.
- July 16 - Mel Chionglo, film director and production designer (d. 2019)
- July 19 - Roberto Pagdanganan, Filipino politician.
- July 22 - Rolando Joven Tria Tirona, Archbishop of Caceres
- July 25 - Bayani Fernando, former chairman of the Metropolitan Manila Development Authority (MMDA). (d. 2023)
- August 5 - Dante Rivero, Filipino actor
- August 8 - Snaffu Rigor, Filipino composer and vocalist. (d. 2016)
- September 6 - Mandy Saguin
- September 8 – Ruel Vernal, Filipino actor
- October 2 - Khryss Adalia, Filipino film, television, and stage director, writer, and actor (d. 2008)
- October 5 - Pacita Abad, Painter (d. 2004)
- October 6 - Eddie Villanueva, Religious/spiritual and political leader
- October 10 - Mauricio Domogan, Filipino politician
- October 12 - Edward Hagedorn, Filipino politician and former mayor of Puerto Princesa City
- October 14 - Joey de Leon, Filipino comedian, actor, and television presenter
- October 16 - Exequiel Javier, Filipino politician
- October 31 - Helen Vela, Filipino actress and radio/TV personality (d. 1992)
- November 5 - Ariel Ureta, Filipino comedian, actor, and TV host
- November 10 - Reynaldo Wycoco, Director of National Bureau of Investigation
- November 15 - Raffy Marcelo, Veteran Broadcaster
- November 18 - Cornelio Padilla, former Filipino cyclist (d. 2013)
- November 19 - Ramon Tulfo, TV host, radio broadcaster, and columnist
- December 29 -
  - Arturo Brion, Associate Justice of the Supreme Court of the Philippines.
  - Wilhelmino Sy-Alvarado, Governor of the Philippine province of Bulacan.

=== Unknown ===
- Adolovni Acosta, Philippine-born classical pianist.
- Teo Antonio, Filipino poet
- Lito Banayo, Filipino politician

== Deaths ==
- July 20 - Gil Montilla, Filipino politician (born 1876)

=== Unknown ===
- Benigno Ramos, author, writer, organization founder, politician (born 1893)
- Isidro Ancheta, Filipino landscape painter (born 1882)
