= 1945 in the Philippines =

- Decades: 1920s; 1930s; 1940s; 1950s; 1960s
- See also: List of years in the Philippines; films

== Incumbents ==
=== Philippine Commonwealth ===
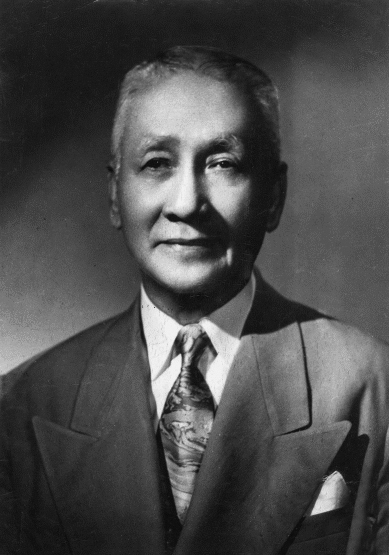
President Sergio Osmeña

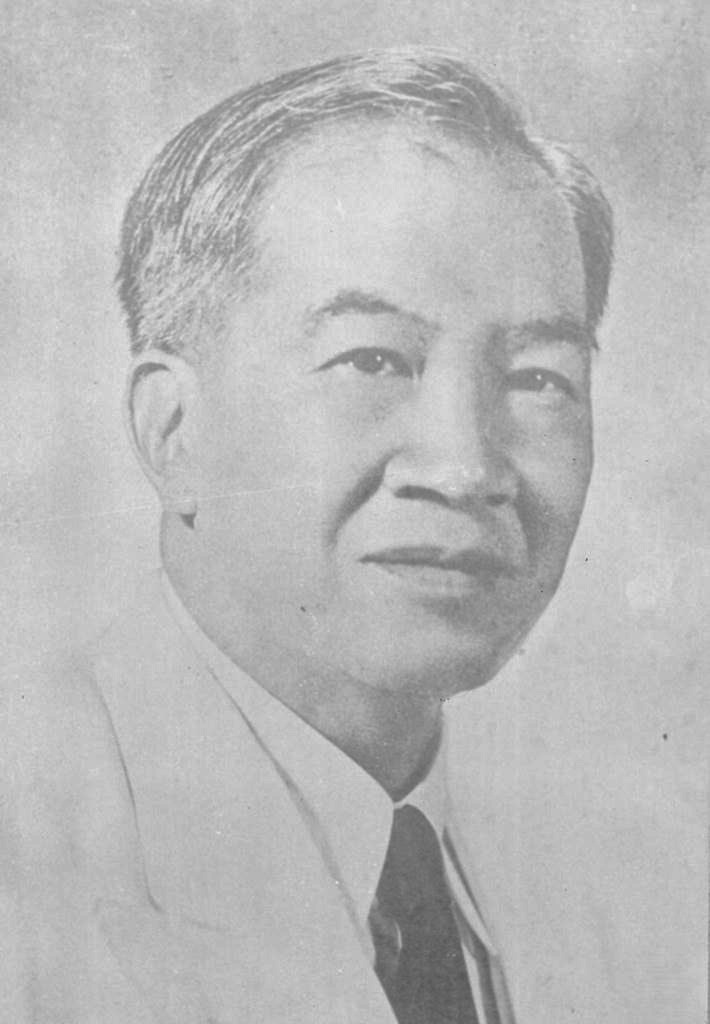
President Jose P. Laurel

- President: Sergio Osmeña (Nacionalista Party)
- Chief Justice:
  - José Yulo (until July 9)
  - Manuel Moran (starting July 9)
- Congress: 1st

=== Second Philippine Republic ===
- President: José P. Laurel (until August 17)
- Prime Minister: Jorge B. Vargas (until August 17)
- Chief Justice:
  - José Yulo (until July 9)
  - Manuel Moran (starting July 9)
- Vice President: Benigno Aquino, Sr. (until August 17)
- Minister of Foreign Affairs: Claro M. Recto (until August 17)
- Minister of Justice: Quintin Trance (until August 17)
- Minister of Home Affairs: Teofilo Sison (until August 17)

== Events ==
=== January ===
- January–September – Battle of Maguindanao
- January 6–9 – Invasion of Lingayen Gulf
- January 9–August 15 – Battle of Luzon
- January 30 – Raid at Cabanatuan: 121 American soldiers and 800 Filipino guerrillas free 813 American Prisoners of war from the Japanese-held camp in the city of Cabanatuan in the Philippines.
- January 31–February 21 – Battle of Bataan (1945)

=== February ===
- February 3–March 3 – Battle of Manila United States forces enter the outskirts of Manila to capture it from the Japanese Imperial Army, starting the battle.
- February 5 – The first jeepney arrives in Manila.
- February 7 – General Douglas MacArthur returns to Manila.
- February 16–26 – Battle of Corregidor American and Filipino ground forces land on Corregidor Island in the Philippines.
- February 16 – Combined American and Filipino forces recapture the Bataan Peninsula.
- February 21–April 26 – Battle of Baguio (1945).
- February 23:
  - Raid at Los Baños – The 11th Airborne Division, with Filipino guerrillas, freed the captives of the Los Baños internment camp.
  - The capital of the Philippines, Manila, is liberated by combined American and Filipino ground troops.
  - American and Filipino troops enter Intramuros, Manila.
- February 28–April 22 – Invasion of Palawan.

=== March ===
- March 3 – United States and Filipino troops take Manila, Philippines.
- March 16 – Establishment of the Congress of Labor Organizations (CLO), a federation of labor organizations organized by former leaders of the Hukbo ng Bayan Laban sa mga Hapon (Hukbalahap).
- March 10–August 15 – Battle of Mindanao.
- March 18–July 30 – Battle of the Visayas.
- March 19 – Battle of Bacsil Ridge.
- March 26–April 8 – Battle for Cebu City.

=== April ===
- April 27–August 15 – Battle of Davao.

=== June ===
- June 9 – The Philippine Congress is convened for the first time since the elections of November 1941.
- June 14 – Battle of Bessang Pass.

=== July ===
- July 4 – MacArthur declares the military campaign on Luzon as closed.
- July 5 – The Philippines is declared liberated.

=== August ===
- August 17 – Philippines President José P. Laurel issues an Executive Proclamation putting an end to the Second Philippine Republic, thus ending to his term as President of the Philippines.

=== September ===
- September 2 – Japanese general Tomoyuki Yamashita surrenders to Filipino and American forces at Kiangan, Ifugao.
- September 26 – The province of Catanduanes is created through Commonwealth Act No. 687.

== Holidays ==
As per Act No. 2711 section 29, issued on March 10, 1917, any legal holiday of fixed date falls on Sunday, the next succeeding day shall be observed as legal holiday. Sundays are also considered legal religious holidays. Bonifacio Day was added through Philippine Legislature Act No. 2946. It was signed by then-Governor General Francis Burton Harrison in 1921. On October 28, 1931, the Act No. 3827 was approved declaring the last Sunday of August as National Heroes Day.

- January 1 – New Year's Day
- February 22 – Legal Holiday
- March 29 – Maundy Thursday
- March 30 – Good Friday
- May 1 – Labor Day
- July 4 – Philippine Republic Day
- August 13 – Legal Holiday
- August 26 – National Heroes Day
- November 22 – Thanksgiving Day
- November 30 – Bonifacio Day
- December 25 – Christmas Day
- December 30 – Rizal Day

== Births ==
- January 8 – Rolando Guaves, Filipino cyclist.
- January 28 – Bernardo Bernardo, actor (d. 2018)
- January 30 – Boots Anson-Roa – Filipino actress, columnist, editor, and lecturer.
- February 2 – Eric Eloriaga, Filipino broadcaster
- February 15 – Julian Daan, radio personality, actor, comedian, incumbent Talisay City, Cebu councilor, former Cebu provincial board member and vice-governor (d. 2019)
- February 22 - Peter Musñgi, Voice Over Talent of Kapamilya Channel and DZMM, and Radio News Host of DZMM's "Balitapatan".
- March 6 – Angelo Castro, Jr., Filipino broadcast journalist and actor. (d. 2012)
- March 11 – Jose Mari Chan – Chinese Filipino singer, songwriter and businessman
- March 17 – Angelo Reyes – Filipino general and politician (d. 2011)
- March 18 – Anthony Villanueva – Filipino Olympic Boxer (d. 2014)
- March 23 – Val Sotto, singer, composer, comedian and Filipino actor.
- March 26 – Josephine Acosta Pasricha – Filipino indologist
- March 28 – Rodrigo Duterte – 16th President of the Philippines, was Arrested by President Bongbong Marcos of Marcos Jr. Administration and ICC last March 10, 2025.
- April 19 – Ignacio Bunye – Filipino public official
- May 7 – Helen Gamboa, veteran Actress, former beauty queen and singer
- May 20 – Ernesto Presas, founder of Filipino martial arts system Kombatan.
- June 3:
  - Benhur Salimbangon – Filipino Politician (d. 2020)
  - Ramon Jacinto – Filipino musician, radio jockey, TV host and entrepreneur.
- June 15 – Miriam Defensor Santiago – Filipino Politician (d. 2016)
- June 27 - Jose Miguel Arroyo, former First Gentleman of the Philippines.
- July 23 – Philippe Jones Lhuillier, Filipino diplomat, businessman and philanthropist.
- August 5 – Richard Gordon, politician
- August 20 – Pete Lacaba, Filipino film writer, editor, poet, screenwriter, journalist and translator.
- September 8 – Cheche Lazaro, Filipina broadcast journalist
- September 13 – Gil Portes, film director (d. 2017)
- September 15 – Evelyn Fuentebella, Filipino Mayor
- September 16 – Carlos Dominguez III, businessman and former chief executive of Philippine Airlines (d. 2021)
- September 30 – Victor Ziga, Member of the Senate of the Philippines
- October 7 – Ross Rival, Filipino actor (d. 2007)
- October 26 – Vicente del Rosario Jr., Filipino media executive
- October 29:
  - Reynaldo A. Duque, Ilokano writer (d. 2013)
  - Arnulfo Fuentebella, politician (d. 2020)
- November 11:
  - Eddie Peregrina, Filipino singer (d. 1977)
  - Walden Bello, Filipino author, academic and political analyst
- November 28 – Franklin Drilon, Filipino politician
- December 2 – Lualhati Bautista, Filipino female novelist (d. 2023)
- December 18 – Renato Diaz, Filipino businessman, economist and congressman
- December 31 – Liwayway Vinzons-Chato, Filipino politician

=== Unknown birth ===
- Isagani R. Cruz, Filipino writer

== Deaths ==
- January 6 – Josefa Llanes Escoda, Filipino advocate of women's suffrage and founder of the Girl Scouts of the Philippines (b. 1898)
- January 15 – Pedro Abad Santos, Filipino politician. (b. 1876)
- February 10 – Anacleto Díaz, Filipino jurist (murdered during the Battle of Manila) (b. 1878)
- February 12 – Antonio Villa-Real, Filipino jurist (murdered during the Battle of Manila) (b. 1878)
- February 13 – Maria Orosa, Filipino food technologist, pharmaceutical chemist, humanitarian and war heroine. (born 1893)
- February 21 – Pablo Amorsolo, Filipino painter (b.1898)
- July 31 – Artemio Ricarte, Filipino general (b. 1866)
