= 1944 in the Philippines =

- Decades: 1920s; 1930s; 1940s; 1950s; 1960s
- See also: List of years in the Philippines; films

1944 in the Philippines details events of note that happened in the Philippines in the year 1944.

== Incumbents ==
=== Philippine Commonwealth ===
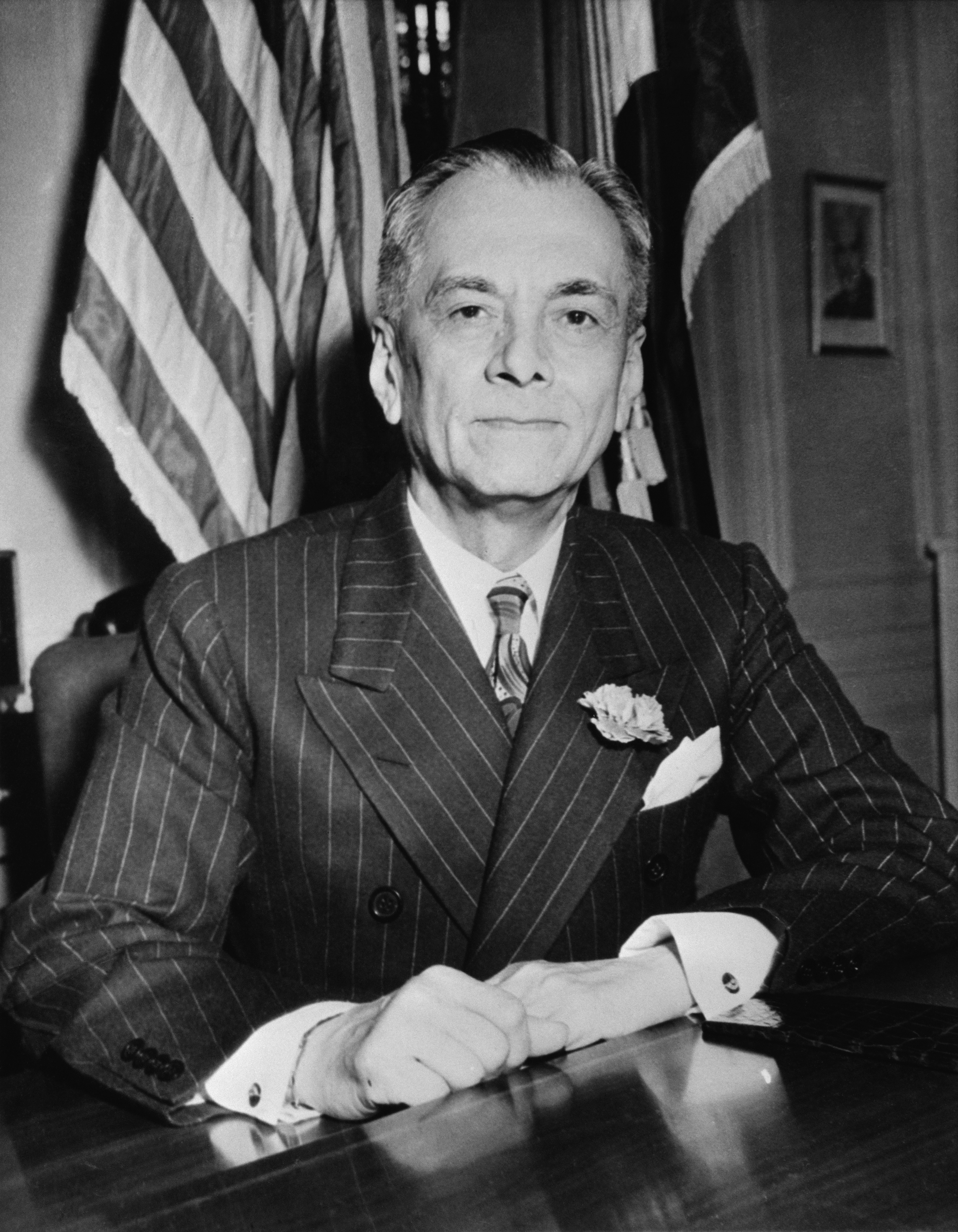
Outgoing President Manuel Quezon

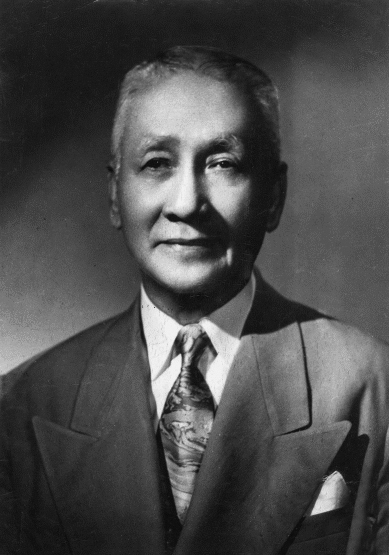
Incoming President Sergio Osmeña

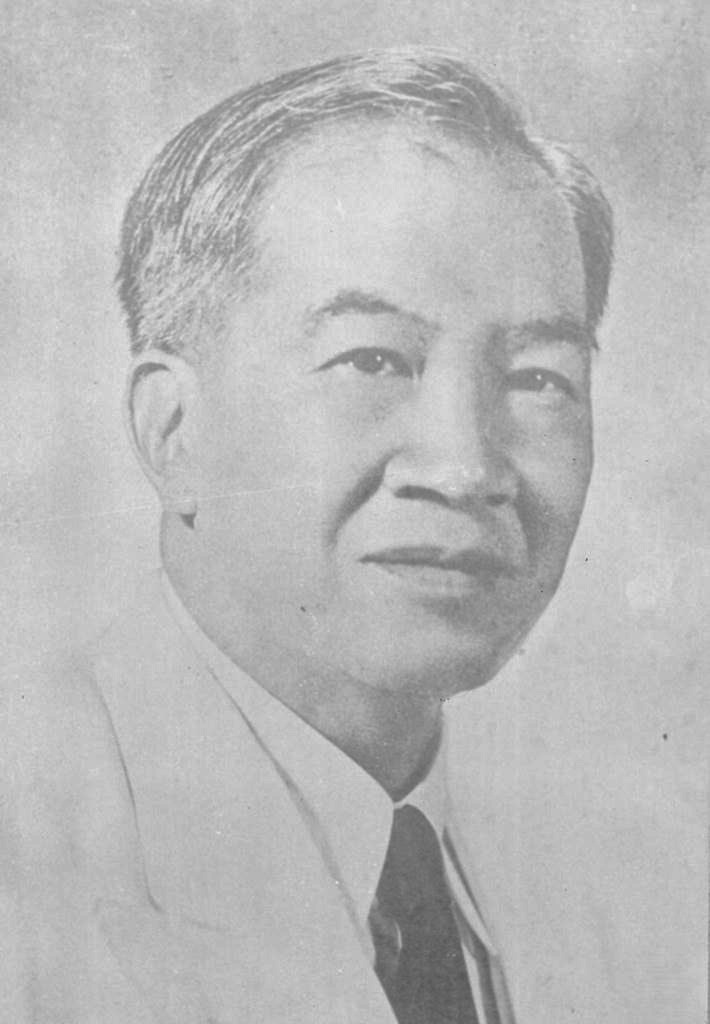
President Jose P. Laurel

- President:
  - Manuel Quezon (Nacionalista Party) (until August 1)
  - Sergio Osmeña (Nacionalista Party) (starting August 1)
- Vice President:
  - Sergio Osmeña (Nacionalista Party) (until August 1)
  - vacant (starting August 1)
- Chief Justice: José Yulo
- Philippine National Assembly: National Assembly (until February 2)

=== Second Philippine Republic ===
- President: José P. Laurel
- Prime Minister: Jorge B. Vargas
- Vice President: Benigno Aquino, Sr.
- Chief Justice: José Yulo

== Events ==
=== January ===
- January 8 – World War II: Philippine Commonwealth troops under the Philippine Commonwealth Army, Philippine Constabulary and the USAFIP-NL units enter the province of Ilocos Sur in northern Luzon and attack Japanese forces.

=== August ===
- August 1 – Sergio Osmena assumes the Office of the President of the Commonwealth of the Philippines after the death of Manuel Quezon.

=== September ===
- September 18 – Filipino forces under the 9th Samar Company of the Philippine Constabulary were ambushed at Barrio Cansumangkay in Balangiga, Samar and attack Japanese Imperial forces.
- September 21 – US forces raids Manila.
- September 26 – Tomoyuki Yamashita appointed as Japanese Military Governor (1944–1945).

=== October ===
- October 20:
  - General MacArthur lands in Palo, Leyte, accompanied by President Sergio Osmena and US troops.
  - American forces land on the beaches in Dulag, Leyte, the Philippines, accompanied by Filipino troops entering the town, and fiercely opposed by the Japanese occupation forces. The combined forces liberate Tacloban.
- October 23 – The Commonwealth government of the Philippines is re-established in Tacloban, Leyte.
- October 25 – The USS Samuel B Roberts ship goes down during a battle off the central island of Samar.

=== December ===
- December 8 – Pro-Japanese Philippine generals Pio Duran and Benigno Ramos organize the Makapilis.

== Holidays ==
As per Act No. 2711 section 29, issued on March 10, 1917, any legal holiday of fixed date falls on Sunday, the next succeeding day shall be observed as legal holiday. Sundays are also considered legal religious holidays. Bonifacio Day was added through Philippine Legislature Act No. 2946. It was signed by then-Governor General Francis Burton Harrison in 1921. On October 28, 1931, the Act No. 3827 was approved declaring the last Sunday of August as National Heroes Day.

- January 1 – New Year's Day
- February 22 – Legal Holiday
- April 6 – Maundy Thursday
- April 7 – Good Friday
- May 1 – Labor Day
- July 4 – Philippine Republic Day
- August 13 – Legal Holiday
- August 27 – National Heroes Day
- November 23 – Thanksgiving Day
- November 30 – Bonifacio Day
- December 25 – Christmas Day
- December 30 – Rizal Day

== Births ==
- January 19 – Robert Barbers, Filipino politician (d. 2005)
- January 23 – Mahar Mangahas, economist
- January 30 – Warlito Cajandig, Roman Catholic prelate (d. 2025)
- February 7 – Eddie Gil, Filipino singer
- March 25 – Hermilando Mandanas, Filipino politician
- March 27 – Lydia Yu-Jose, political science professor (d. 2014)
- April 29 – Tingting Cojuangco, Filipino politician
- May 2 – Roberto Sebastian, businessman and philanthropist (d. 2012)
- May 22 – Roberto A. Abad, Filipino Lawyer and Judge
- June 23 – Silvestre Bello III, businessman, lawyer, and Secretary of Labor and Employment
- June 28 – Teresa Aquino-Oreta, Philippine senator (d. 2020)
- June 29 – Jose Alvarez, politician
- August 6 – Inday Badiday, host and journalist (d. 2003)
- September 19 – Carlos Padilla, Filipino politician (d. 2023)
- September 29 – Leopoldo S. Tumulak, bishop of Diocese of Tagbilaran (d. 2017)
- October 18 – Bomber Moran, actor (d. 2004)
- October 22 – Voltaire Gazmin, soldier and politician
- November 2 – Jun Factoran, lawyer, politician, and human rights activist (d. 2020)
- November 17 – Orlando Bauzon, Basketball player (d. 2020)
- December 4 – Ronaldo Zamora, Minority Leader
- December 11 – Ernesto Lariosa, Cebuano writer, poet, and columnist (d. 2019)

== Deaths ==
- January – Bonifacio Mencias, Filipino physician, epidemiologist, guerrillasympathizer, and martyr.(born 1888)
- February 11 – José Ozámiz, Filipino politician (born 1898)
- August 1 – Manuel L. Quezon, Philippine president (born 1878)
- August 28 – Rafael R. Roces, Jr., Filipino journalist, writer, patriot, World War II spy, hero, and martyr. (born 1912)
- August 30 – Manuel Arguilla, Ilokano writer in English, patriot, and martyr. (born 1911)
- December 25 – Jacinto Ciria Cruz, Olympic Basketball player and coach
- December 31 – Vicente Lim, Filipino Brigadier General and hero during World War II (born 1888)
