= 2005 in the Philippines =

- Decades: 1980s; 1990s; 2000s; 2010s; 2020s
- See also: List of years in the Philippines; films

2005 in the Philippines details events of note that happened in the Philippines in the year 2005.

== Incumbents ==
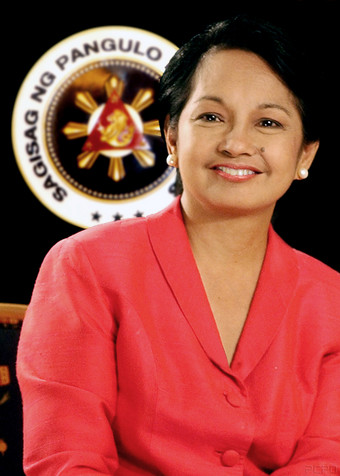
Gloria Macapagal
M. Arroyo

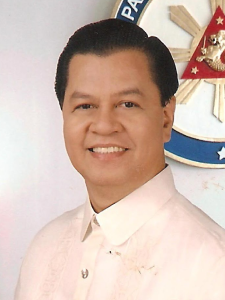
Noli L.
de Castro Jr.

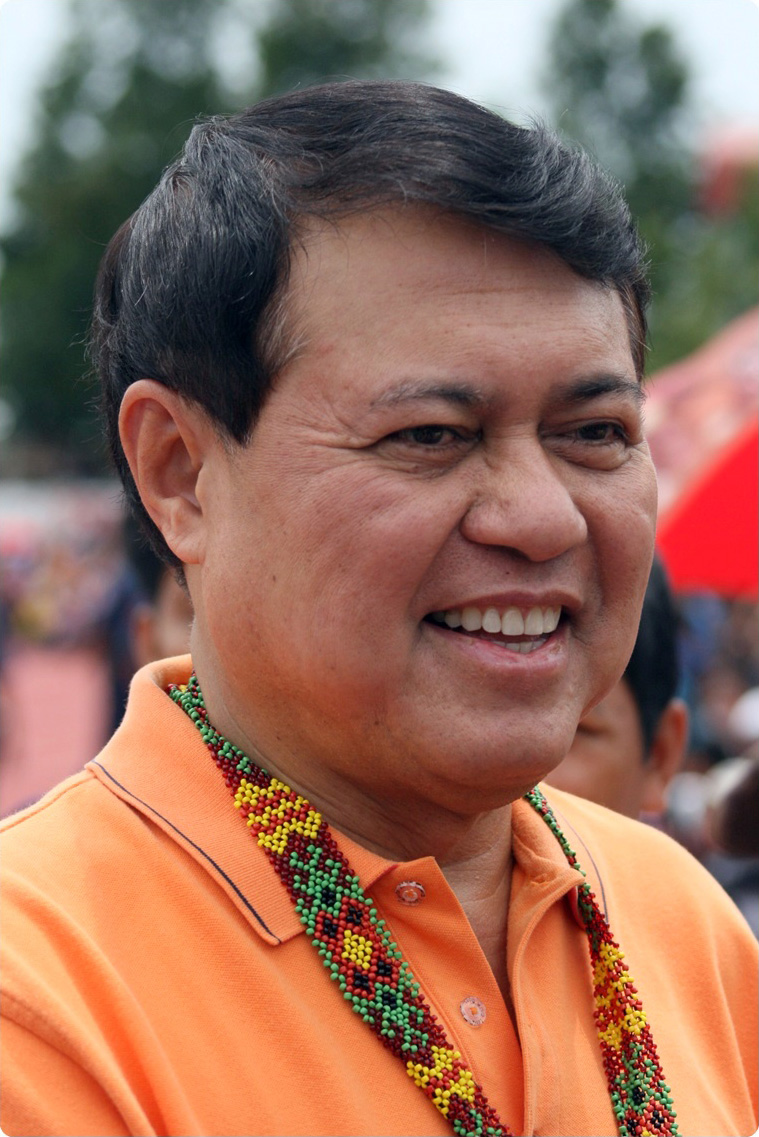
Manny B.
Villar Jr.

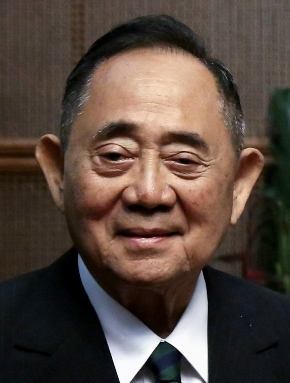
Jose C.
de Venecia Jr.

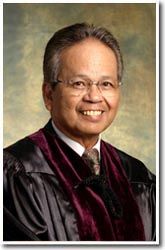
Artermio V.
Panganiban Jr.

- President: Gloria Macapagal Arroyo (Lakas–CMD)
- Vice President: Noli de Castro (Independent)
- Senate President: Manny Villar
- House Speaker: Jose de Venecia
- Chief Justice:
  - Hilario Davide (until December 19)
  - Artemio Panganiban (from December 20)
- Philippine Congress: 13th Congress of the Philippines

== Events ==
=== February ===
- February 14 – The Valentine's Day bombings occur in different cities in the country, killing nine and injuring over a hundred people.

=== March ===
- March 14 –
  - A day-long siege, hostage-taking, and jailbreak attempt, staged by three top leaders of Abu Sayyaf Group, commanders Robot, Global, and Kosovo, in a prison in Camp Bagong Diwa, Taguig City ends in an assault by the police, killing more than twenty people, mostly inmates, including the perpetrators.
  - The Philippines, China, and Vietnam sign the Tripartite Agreement for Joint Marine Seismic Undertaking (JMSU), covering 142,886 square kilometers in the South China Sea.

=== April ===
- April 2 – 25 people are killed in multiple jeepney-bus collisions in Pangasinan and Quezon.
- April 18 – Five persons are injured during the clash of two religious organizations, Iglesia ni Cristo and Members Church of God International inside a fastfood chain located in Apalit, Pampanga.

=== May ===
- May 24 – A Philippine Air Force T41D trainer crashes in Baguio, killing all four on board.

=== June ===
- June 6 – Typhoon Nesat reaches Category 4 strength east of the Philippines, with sustained winds of 115 knots (213 km/h).
- June 27 – President Gloria Macapagal Arroyo addresses the country in a television broadcast, admitting speaking to an election official, but denying manipulating election results.

=== July ===
- July 15 – Typhoon Haitang enters the Philippine Area of Responsibility and is named Feria by PAGASA; it does not make landfall in the country, and the system is monitored as it intensifies into a super typhoon.

=== September ===
- September 21 – Tropical Storm Labuyo (Typhoon Damrey) hits northeast Luzon, causing floods and landslides in Ilocos Norte, Cagayan, and Isabela. At least 16 people die and 20,000 are displaced.
- A bombing in Zamboanga attributed to Islamic militants injures 24 people.

=== October ===
- October 26 – An explosion occurs inside a gold mine tunnel and a landslide strikes on Mount Diwata in Compostela Valley killing at least 32 people, with five others missing and feared dead.

=== November ===
- November 27 – The Philippines hosts the 23rd Southeast Asian Games, officially opened at Quirino Grandstand, Rizal Park in Manila by President Gloria Macapagal-Arroyo.

== Holidays ==
On November 13, 2002, Republic Act No. 9177 declares Eidul Fitr as a regular holiday. The EDSA Revolution Anniversary was proclaimed since 2002 as a special non-working holiday. Note that in the list, holidays in bold are "regular holidays" and those in italics are "nationwide special days".

- January 1 – **New Year's Day**
- February 25 – EDSA Revolution Anniversary
- March 24 – **Maundy Thursday**
- March 25 – **Good Friday**
- April 9 – **Araw ng Kagitingan (Day of Valor)**
- May 1 – **Labor Day**
- June 12 – **Independence Day**
- August 21 – Ninoy Aquino Day
- August 28 – **National Heroes Day**
- November 1 – All Saints Day
- November 3 – **Eidul Fitr**
- November 30 – **Bonifacio Day**
- December 25 – **Christmas Day**
- December 30 – **Rizal Day**
- December 31 – Last Day of the Year

In addition, several other places observe local holidays, such as the foundation of their town. These are also "special days."

== Television ==
- September 26 – Lara Quigaman of the Philippines is crowned as Miss International 2005 in the pageant night was held in Koseinenkin Hall, Tokyo, Japan, and she became the fourth Filipina to win the pageant.
- Kim Flores - Won five gold medals and four gold plaques in the World Championships of the Performing Arts (WCOPA) across categories of pop, Broadway, gospel, original and inspirational music.

== Sports ==
- January 30 — PBA Commissioner Noli Eala forfeits Game 1 of the 2005 Philippine Cup that resulted to Talk 'n Text Phone Pals leading 1–0, as Talk n' Text's Asi Taulava, who was still suspended by the league, participated in the game.
- July 10 -- San Miguel Beermen wins the Fiesta Conference, defeating Talk 'n Text Phone Pals in five games.

== Births ==
- February 22 – Isabella Flanigan, footballer
- February 23 – Jillian Ward, actress and commercial model
- March 18 – Marc Justine Alvarez, actor
- March 25 – Larah Claire Sabroso, actress
- May 23 – Alexandra Eala, tennis player
- June 12 – Ryzza Mae Dizon, actress
- September 7 – Kyle Danielle Ocampo, actress
- December 12 – Alekhine Nouri, Filipino FIDE Master
- December 15 – Sheena Belarmino, singer and dancer

== Deaths ==
- January 7 – Orly Punzalan, Filipino radio-TV personality (b. 1935)
- February 25 – Francis E. Garchitorena Filipino Sandiganbayan Presiding Judge (b. 1938)
- March 17 – Cecille "Dabiana" Iñigo, Filipina film actress and comedian (b. 1952)
- March 24 – Marlene Garcia-Esperat, Filipina whistleblower and investigative journalist, murder victim (b. 1959)
- March 31 – Justiniano Montano, Filipino politician (b. 1905)
- April 11 – Teodoro Borlongan, Filipino Banker (b. 1955)
- April 28 – Raymundo Punongbayan, former director of the Philippine Institute of Volcanology and Seismology (PHIVOLCS) (1983–2002) (b. 1937)
- May 4 – Luis Taruc, Filipino political figure and insurgent (b. 1913)
- May 9 – Ang Kiukok, Filipino painter and a National Artist for Visual Arts (b. 1931)
- May 10 – Romy Diaz, Filipino actor (b. 1941)
- May 11 – Philip Agustin, editor and publisher (b. 1950)
- June 3 – Teodoro Benigno, journalist, writer (b. 1923)
- June 8 – Luis Santiago, TV director (b. 1977)
- June 21 – Jaime Sin, Roman Catholic Archbishop of Manila (b. 1928)
- July 15 – Leonor Orosa-Goquingco, Filipino national artist (b. 1917)
- August 5 – Raul Roco, Former senator and Filipino presidential candidate, cancer (b. 1941)
- August 10 – Mar Amongo, Filipino comic book artist (b. 1936)
- September 4 – Roseli Ocampo-Friedmann, Filipino-American microbiologist and botanist (b. 1937)
- September 13 – Haydee Yorac, Filipino public servant, law professor and politician (b. 1941)
- October 27 – Jun Papa, Olympic basketball player (b. 1945)
- November 18 – Freddie Quizon, Filipino actor, comedian, production coordinator (b. 1956)
- December 15 – Alfredo Lagmay, Filipino Psychologist (b. 1919)
- December 19 – Reynaldo Wycoco, Director of National Bureau of Investigation (b. 1946)
- December 25 – Robert Barbers, politician, Heart Attack (b. 1944)

=== Unknown ===
- Fred Carrillo, Filipino comic book artist. (b. 1926)
