= 1942 in the Philippines =

- Decades: 1920s; 1930s; 1940s; 1950s; 1960s
- See also: List of years in the Philippines; films

1942 in the Philippines details events of note that happened in the Philippines in the year 1942.

== Incumbents ==
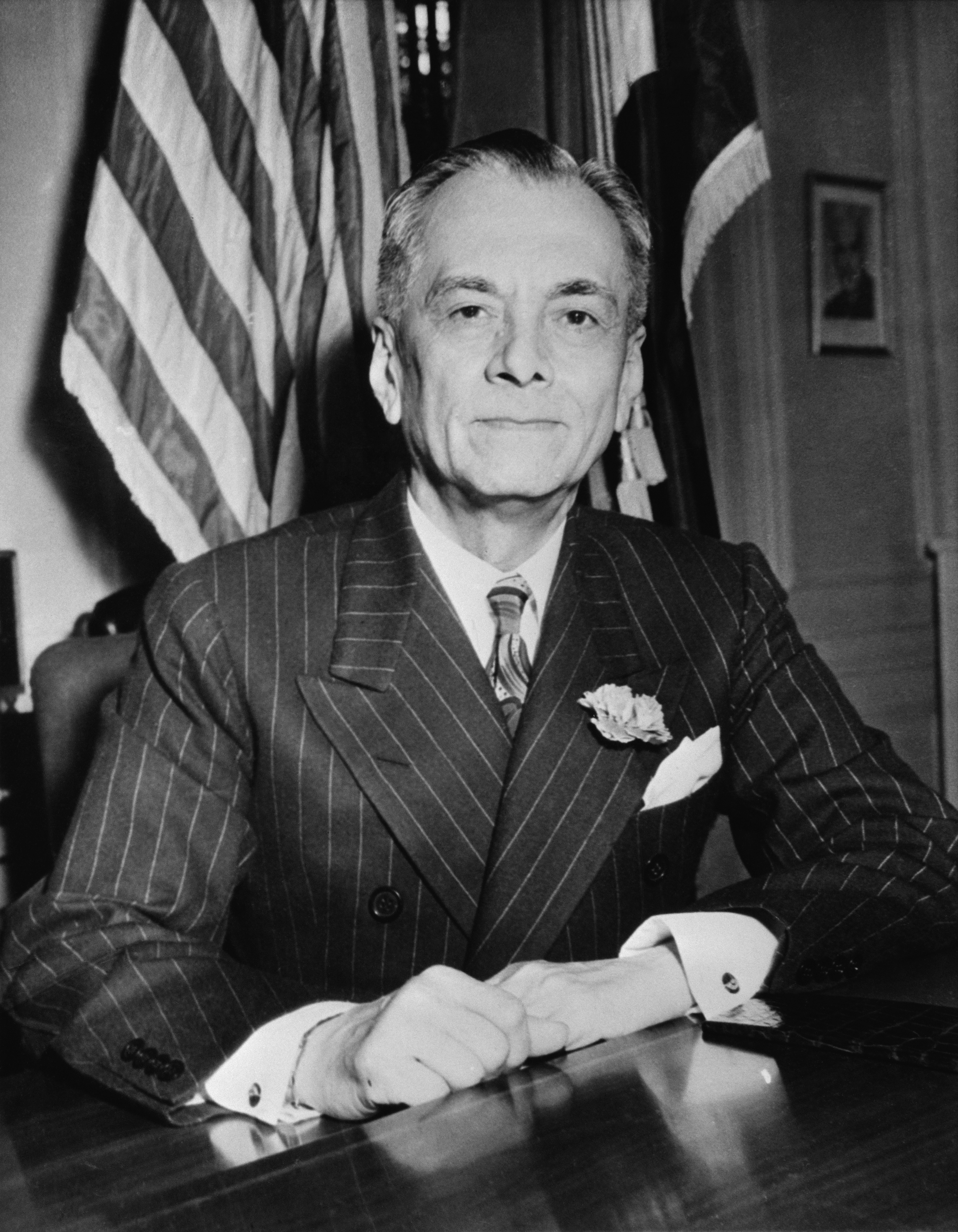
President Manuel Quezon

- President: Manuel Quezon (Nacionalista Party)
- Vice President: Sergio Osmeña (Nacionalista Party)
- Chief Justice:
  - José Abad Santos (until May 1)
  - José Yulo (starting May 7)

== Events ==
=== January ===
- January 2 – Japanese troops enter Manila.
- January 3:
  - Masaharu Homma is appointed as Japanese Military Governor (1942).
  - General Masaharu Homma declares the end of American Rule in the Philippines.
  - Martial Law is declared.
- January 13 – All forms of opposition against the Japanese forces are declared subject to death penalty.
- January 23 – An executive committee, composed of Filipinos, is formed by General Homma as a conduit of the military administration's policies and requirements.

=== February ===
- February 17 – The Japanese Military Government issues an order adopting the Japanese educational system in the country.
- February 20 – President Quezon and the war cabinet leave for the United States.

=== March ===
- March 11 – General MacArthur leaves for Australia to take command of the South Western Pacific Area.
- March 13 – The Commonwealth government is moved to the United States.
- March 29 – The People's Anti-Japanese Army or Hukbong Bayan Laban sa Hapon (Hukbalahap) is organized.

=== April ===
- April 9 – Bataan, under US commander General Edward King, being the last province, surrenders to the Japanese armies.

=== May ===
May 1

  - Philippines adopts Japan Standard Time at 12:00 a.m. moving the clock one hour ahead.
  - Bicolano guerilla forces engage the amassed concentration of Japanese garrisons in Naga.
- May 3 – Japanese starts to occupy the Philippines.
- May 5 – Japanese troops lands on Corregidor Island for the last stand of attack by Filipino and American forces.
- May 6 – Corregidor Island falls to Japanese forces.

=== June ===
- June 8 – Shizuichi Tanaka appointed as Japanese Military Governor (1942–1943)
- June 14 – The Commonwealth of the Philippines becomes a member of the United Nations.

=== December ===
- December 30 – The Kalibapi is organized by the Japanese.

=== Unknown date ===
- April – A pro-US resistance movement is organized, mainly to provide data to the US on enemy positions.

== Holidays ==
As per Act No. 2711 section 29, issued on March 10, 1917, any legal holiday of fixed date falls on Sunday, the next succeeding day shall be observed as legal holiday. Sundays are also considered legal religious holidays. Bonifacio Day was added through Philippine Legislature Act No. 2946. It was signed by then-Governor General Francis Burton Harrison in 1921. On October 28, 1931, the Act No. 3827 was approved declaring the last Sunday of August as National Heroes Day.

- January 1 – New Year's Day
- February 22 – Legal Holiday
- April 2 – Maundy Thursday
- April 3 – Good Friday
- May 1 – Labor Day
- July 4 – Philippine Republic Day
- August 13 – Legal Holiday
- August 30 – National Heroes Day
- November 26 – Thanksgiving Day
- November 30 – Bonifacio Day
- December 25 – Christmas Day
- December 30 – Rizal Day

== Births ==
- March 22 – Spanky Manikan, actor (d. 2018)
- May 1 – Edcel Lagman, lawyer and politician (d. 2025)
- August 11 – Delia Albert, career diplomat
- August 14 - Alonzo Saclag, musician and dancer (d. 2025) (Note: Cited as August 4 in some sources.)
- August 15 – Jun Chipeco Jr., politician
- September 10 – Lito Legaspi, actor (d. 2019)
- September 11 – Ernesto Herrera, former senator (d. 2015)
- September 14 – Arturo Macapagal, olympic shooter (d. 2015)
- September 16 – Tommy Abuel, actor
- October 3 – Kidlat Tahimik, film director and writer
- October 31 – Eduardo Castrillo, sculptor (d. 2016)
- November 5 – Elias Tolentino, basketball player (d. 2017)
- November 24 – Freddie Webb, actor, basketball player, and politician
- December 18 – Salvador Escudero, politician and veterinarian (d. 2012)
- December 20 – Danilo Suarez, politician

== Death ==
- May 2 – José Abad Santos, Chief Justice of the Supreme Court of the Philippines (b. 1886)
