= Philip Agustin =

- Born: ca. 1951; Talavera, Nueva Ecija, Philippines
- Died: May 10, 2005; Barangay Paltic, Dingalan, Aurora, Philippines
- Cause of death: Single bullet wound to the head
- Other names: Balbas
- Occupations: Publisher and editor
- Years active: 1987-2005
- Employer: Starline Times Recorder
- Spouse: Widowed
- Children: Rosebelle Agustin-Cruz

Philip Agustin (ca. 1951 – 10 May 2005), publisher and editor for the local newspaper, Starline Times Recorder, in Dingalan, Philippines.

== Personal history ==
Philip Agustin was born in Talavera, Nueva Ecija, Philippines around 1951. He was a widower and he was survived by his daughter Rosebelle Agustin-Cruz.

== Career ==
Agustin started his life in politics in 1974, and he soon found this wasn't the career path for him. He would later return to politics. In his home town of Talavera, Nueva Ecija, Agustin ran for mayor in 1998 and for a town councilor position in 2004 but lost both of these positions. In 1977, Agustin joined the Special Forces Airborne, where he stayed for 10 years.

After the military, he began working in print media as a journalist around 1987. He was a journalist for 13 years when he founded the Starline Times Recorder around 2000. This local newspaper focused on crime and corruption in the Filipino town Dingalan. His first column was called "Rap With Me". The last issue he prepare as publisher/editor for his paper focused on a scandal involving the mayor.

== Death ==
Philip Agustin was murdered on 10 May 2005 inside his daughter's home. A hit man on a motorcycle pulled up to the house, and he shot at Agustin, who was inside, through an open window. The shot hit Agustin just behind his left ear. Agustin was rushed to a nearby hospital where he died shortly after arriving. Investigators say a .45-caliber gun was used to carry out the murder.

== Investigation ==
Jaime Ylarde, the mayor and a former police officer, had been the focus of many of Agustin's stories in the Starline Times Recorder. Agustin's reporting described the corruption that had been happening during Ylarde's term as mayor. In the newspaper that was set to be released on 11 May 2005, Agustin wrote about missing government funds in Dingalan. This story centered around Ylarde as the suspect. Although Ylarde denies having any connection to the murder, many believe the critical press coverage was a clear motive.

Reynaldo Moreto told the police that Mayor and former police officer Jaime Ylarde had instructed his cousin, Nilo Morete, to murder Philip Agustin. Emmanuel Alday and Nilo Morete were Ylarde's bodyguards, and Reynaldo Moreto was a workman in Ylarde's office when he was mayor.

The accused killers were Reynaldo Morete, Nilo Morete, and Emmanuel Alday. The mastermind behind the killing was rumored to be Mayor and former police officer Jaime Ylarde, but all charged ever filed against him have since been dropped.

== Impact ==
Philip Agustin made national headlines because he was the fourth journalist killed in the Philippines in 2005. He was also the second journalist killed in less than a week. Since 2004, The Philippines has been high on the charts for the most dangerous country for media of all types to report in. After the numerous murders that early in the year, the Philippine government had no choice but to uncover its eyes to the danger and injustice being served to unprotected reporters whose deaths rarely see a convicted suspect.

Agustin's death was one of the beginning events that set off a group in the Philippines called the Association of Responsible Media (ARMED). ARMED is a group of journalists in the Philippines who have started arming themselves with guns on and off the job in order to protect themselves and their families. This created controversy because in the past journalists have not been advised to carry guns.

== Reactions ==
Kōichirō Matsuura, the Director-General of United Nations Educational, Scientific and Cultural Organization (UNESCO), publicly spoke about Philip Agustin's murder. His goal was to raise awareness of the ridiculous rampant killings that had been occurring in the Philippines. The murder of Philip Agustin sparked the start up of a group called the Association of Responsible Media (ARMED). These reporters are all trained in armed self defense. This got international attention because other reporters around the world had never carried loaded weapons with them for protection.
