= Mariano Yogore =

Filipino microbiologist

Dr. Mariano G. Yogore, Jr. (December 29, 1921 in Iloilo City, Philippines – June 1, 2006) was a Filipino microbiologist. He studied at the University of the Philippines in 1945 and Johns Hopkins University in Baltimore, Maryland in 1948.

Yogore was a research associate and professor of parasitology at the University of Chicago from 1969–1986. Prior to that, he was research associate and associate professor at the University of Chicago from 1967–1969. He also served as USPHS research fellow at the Department Microbiology at the University of Chicago between 1959 and 1961.

He was a member of the National Research Council of the Philippines from 1957–1973. He was also an instructor and later on professor of parasitology at University of the Philippines, Baguio, from 1945 to 1967.

He was a member of several honorary societies and professional organizations, and was listed as Philippine Man of Science (1964) and American Men and Women of Science No. 1218.
