= Julián Cruz Balmaceda =

Filipino writer (1885–1947)

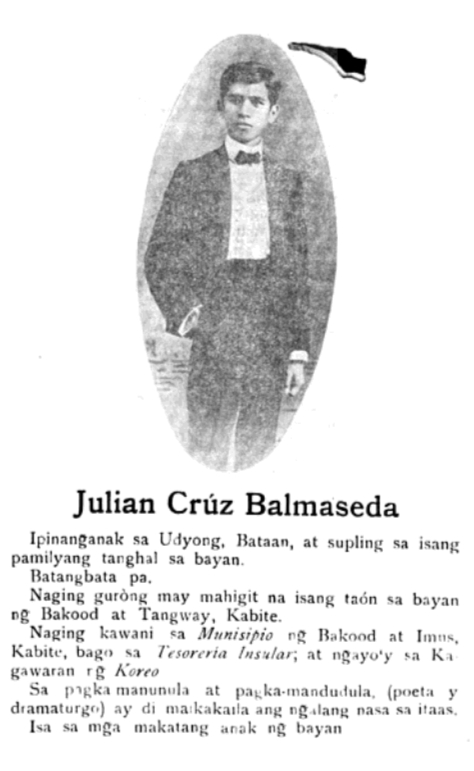
- Balmaceda depicted in The Filipino Teacher's "Pahayagang Buwanan" (1910)
- Born: January 28, 1885; Udyong (now Orion), Bataan, Captaincy General of the Philippines
- Died: September 18, 1947 (aged 62)
- Other names: Julian Cruz Balmaseda
- Occupation(s): playwright, poet
- Known for: Ang Piso ni Anita, Sino Ba Kayo?

Julián Cruz Balmaceda (sometimes spelled as Balmaseda) (January 28, 1885 – September 18, 1947) was a Filipino poet, essayist, playwright, novelist, journalist and linguist. He made several works written in Filipino, English and Spanish languages.

== Early life ==
Balmaceda was born on Orion, Bataan on January 28, 1885. He attended Colegio de San Juan de Letran for college. Two years later, he finished law on Escuela de Derecho (School of Law) under the same college. When he was fourteen, his first written play entitled Sugat ng Puso (Broken Heart). His major play, Ang Piso ni Anita (Anita's One Peso Coin) won first place in a play writing contest sponsored by the Bureau of Posts. The play is all about thriftiness and was composed of three stages.

== Major works ==
- Sa Bunganga ng Pating (On the Shark's Mouth) - condemns usurers and usurpers.
- Budhi ng Manggagawa (Worker's Will), Dugo ng Aking Ama (My Father's Blood), Kaaway na Lihim (Secret Enemy) - discussed his ideals on socialism.
- Ang Tala sa Kabundukan (The Star on the Mountains) - a musical play composed of three stages.
- Kayamanang Lumilipad (Treasury Flies) - an opera of three stages.
- Ale-aleng Namamayong (Lady under the Umbrella) - a poem about sacrifice of love.
- Ang Hampas ng Lupa (Nature's Guilt) - one stage.
- Ligayang Nawawala (Dissipating Happiness) - short story.
- Heneral Gregorio del Pilar - historical play of three stages that narrates the death of Filipino war general Gregorio del Pilar on the Battle of Tirad Pass.
- Sangkuwaltang Abaka (One Penny-worth Abaca) - one of his major breakthrough; it was played many times during Japanese occupation. Sangkuwaltang Abaka was re-played after the war using the title Sino Ba Kayo? (Who are They?) that likewise, became a major play.
- Sining at Agham ng mga Dulang Iisahing Yugto (Science and Arts of One-Staged Plays) - book compilation of his different plays. It explained the existence of arts and sciences when making one-staged plays. The book includes Sino Ba Kayo?; Dahil sa Anak (Because of His/Her Child); Ang Palabas ni Suwan (Suwan's Show); Higanti ng Patay (Dead Man's Revenge); Ang Libingan ng Bayani (The Hero's Tomb); Gregorio H. del Pilar.
