= Tonette Lopez =

Filipino activist

- Born: Oras, Eastern Samar, Philippines
- Died: April 25, 2006; Manila, Philippines
- Occupation: Transactivist
- Years active: 2000-2006

Tonette Lopez (died April 25, 2006) was the first transgender woman activist in the Philippines and a popular Asian LGBT activist, HIV/AIDS researcher and journalist.

Lopez led the 16th International AIDS Conference in 2005.

== Gahum Philippines ==
In 2001, Lopez started the Gay Human Rights Movement (GAHUM), based in Cebu City.

Lopez has stated: "Discrimination is very eminent. A country such ours, which is predominantly Roman Catholic is very difficult. Opinions and decisions are always coiled and intertwined with one's religiosity, belief and faith."

== See also ==
- LGBT rights in the Philippines
