= Cesar Lacbu Nucum =

Filipino radio personality (1938–2007)

Kuya Cesar
- Born: Cesar L. Nucum Sr. May 15, 1938; Candaba, Pampanga
- Died: May 17, 2007 (aged 69); Quezon City, Philippines
- Occupations: Radio announcer, construction worker, balut vendor, construction painter
- Years active: 1961–2002
- Known for: Speed Bagal
- Spouse: Sylvia Nucum

Cesar Lacbu Nucum (May 15, 1938 – May 17, 2007), better known as Kuya Cesar, was a Filipino radio personality. He was also known as "Speed Bagal".

== Early life ==
Cesar Lacbu Nucum was born on May 15, 1938, at Pansinao in Candaba, Pampanga. He is the eldest son of Aurelio and Romana Nucum. Before being a radio announcer, he used to sell balut and was also a scrap collector, collecting old newspaper and used bottles to be sold at their local junk shop, at his hometown. He came to Manila and worked as a construction painter before getting the job as a radio announcer after he auditioned at DZMM, with the help of his very distinctive voice. He is considered as one of the station's pioneers which includes Noli de Castro and Ernie Baron. He kept the job for many decades.

His career was shortly seized when ABS-CBN shut down in 1972 due to martial law. In the 1970s and 80s, Kuya Cesar joined IBC-13 where he was the station manager of DWAN 1206. When ABS-CBN reopened in 1986 after the EDSA People Power Revolution, he returned to DZMM.

== Career ==
During his career, he hosted several radio programs which featured his noted slow manner of speaking. Audiences found his style and endearing and somewhat comic as well. In his programs he gave heartfelt advice to listeners and played music from his generation. He pioneered entertainment talk radio in Taglish on the FM band, which at the time was a shock to many. His noted radio programs were Dear Kuya Cesar, 12am-4 am, and Ikaw sa Likod ng mga Awit, 12:30pm-4 pm. He won several awards in his radio announcer career.

He also appeared in movies like Bala at Lipstick in 1994, Gagay: Prinsesa ng Brownout in 1993 and Tora-Tora, Bang Bang Bang in 1990. During the 80s he had a comedy TV show called Super Laff-In. He gained the nickname "Speed Bagal" due to his slow delivery.

== Personal life ==
He was married to Sylvia Villanueva Nucum, with six sons, the eldest of which is Cesar Jr. (Jun).

== Filmography ==
=== Movies ===
- Talents Unlimited (1968)
- Andres de Saya: Mabagsik na Daw! (1982) - Dr. B. Agal
- Tora Tora, Bang Bang Bang (1990)
- Gagay: Prinsesa ng Brownout (1993)
- Bala at Lipstick (1994) - Cosme
- Walang Iwanan, Peksman! (2002) - Priest

=== TV show ===
- Super Laff-In (1969–1972)

=== Radio shows ===
- Dear Kuya Cesar (DZMM)
- Ikaw sa Likod ng mga Awit (DZMM)

== Death ==
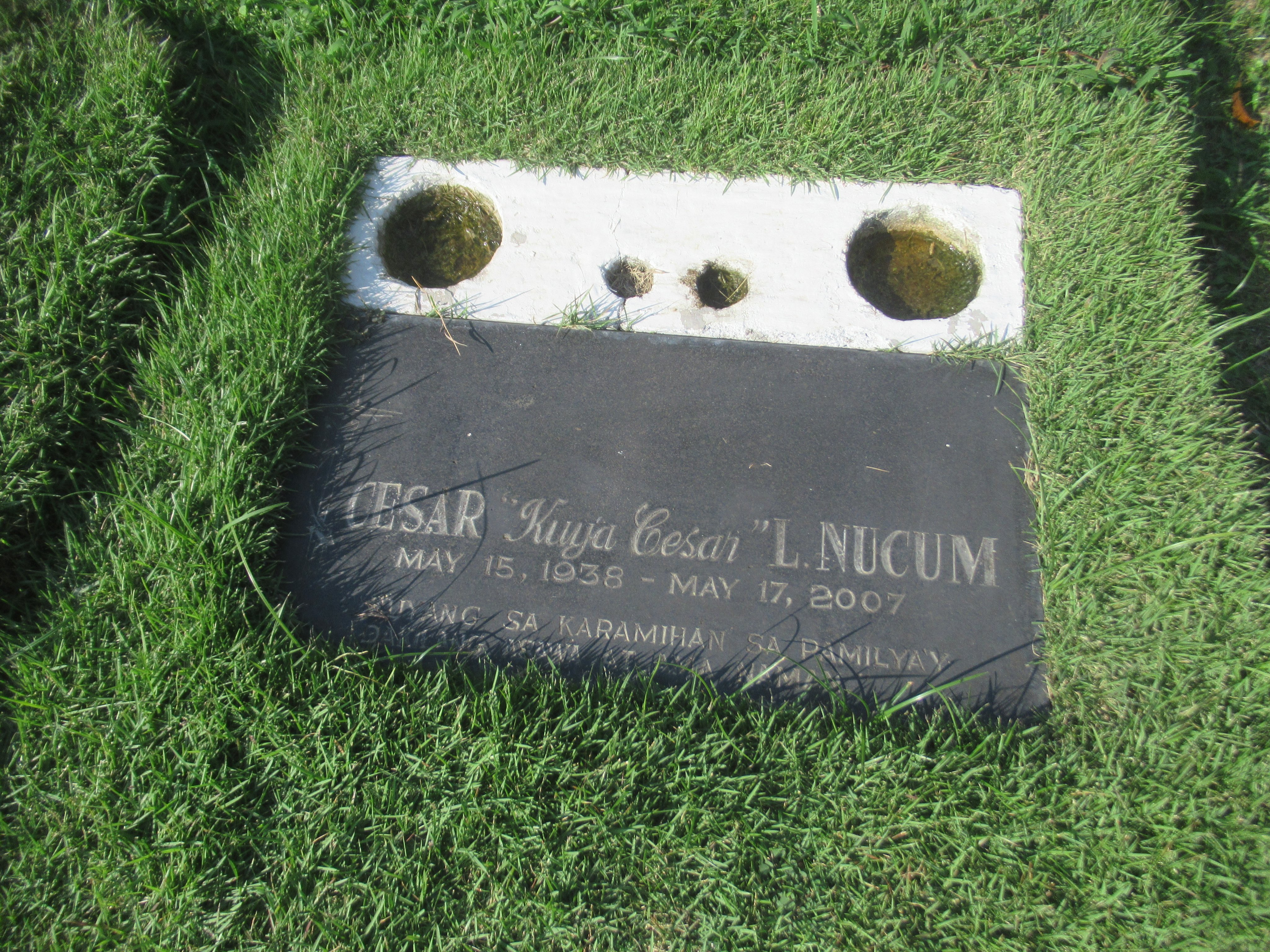
Nucum's grave at Himlayang Pilipino Memorial Park (Quezon City).

On May 17, 2007, at 9:45 pm, just two days after his birthday, Nucum died of an apparent heart attack at the age of 69. Efforts to revive him were done but upon arrival at Capitol Medical Center he was pronounced dead. He was interred at Himlayang Pilipino in Quezon City.
