= Pura Santillan-Castrence =

Filipino writer and diplomat

Pura Santillan-Castrence (March 24, 1905 – January 15, 2007) was a Filipino writer and diplomat. Of Filipino women writers, she was among the first to gain prominence writing in the English language. She was named a Chevalier de Légion d'honneur by the French government.

== Early life ==
She was born in Manila in March 1905. She studied pharmacy and chemistry at the University of the Philippines, where she taught after her graduation in 1927. She pursued further studies in the University of Michigan on a Barbour scholarship. She later became a professor of literature and linguistics at the Graduate School of the University of the East in Manila.

== Literary career ==
Santillan-Castrence's literary career began in the 1920s, and she soon was recognized as among the leading Filipino essayists of the 20th century. Many of her essays were featured in Philippine Prose and Poetry a widely studied high-school textbook which she had authored. She became a columnist with the Manila Daily Bulletin, and contributed essays and articles in many other national publications. She explored feminist themes in works such as The Women Characters in Rizal’s Novels, a study on the female characters in Noli Me Tangere and El Filibusterismo.

== Diplomat ==
Santillan-Castrence first joined the foreign service as the Chief of the Translation Section of the Ministry of Foreign Affairs during the Japanese occupation of the Philippines. After the war, she held various positions within the Department of Foreign Affairs. In 1959, she was designated to the Philippine embassy at Bonn, then the capital of West Germany.

In 1964, Santillan-Castrence was appointed the DFA Assistant Secretary for Cultural Affairs, with rank of Ambassador, by President Diosdado Macapagal. She remained in that post through the first term of President Ferdinand Marcos, and until her retirement.

== Later years and death ==
After retirement from Philippine Government service, Santillan-Castrence became a permanent resident of the United States where she taught in several colleges. Late in life, she moved to Melbourne, Australia to be with a daughter who was an Australian citizen. At age 94, she was contracted to write a regular column for the Bayanihan News and the Manila Mail, publications which catered to Filipino expatriates. By then legally blind, she dictated her columns, which proved to be popular. She wrote critically against the Iraq War and on the ties between the United States and President Gloria Macapagal Arroyo. At age 100, she published a compilation of these articles in a book entitled As I See It: Filipinos and the Philippines.

Santillan-Castrence died aged 101 in January 2007, just one month before she was slated to receive a lifetime achievement award from the National Commission on Culture and the Arts.
