= Bonifacio Day =

National holiday in the Philippines

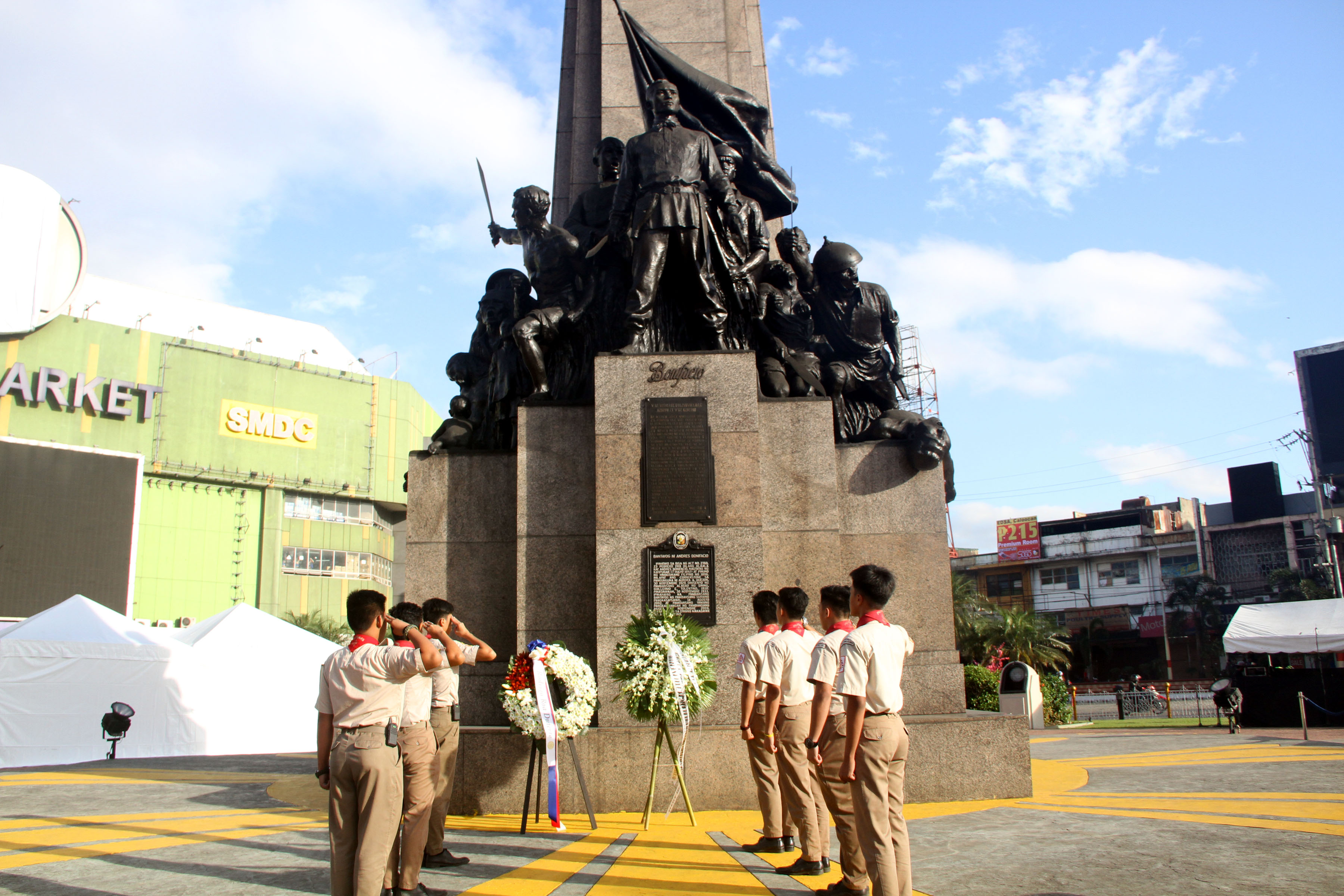
- Boy scouts from the National Capital Region paying tribute to Andrés Bonifacio at the Bonifacio Monument in Caloocan on Bonifacio Day 2018
- Observed by: Philippines
- Type: National
- Significance: Commemoration of the life of Andrés Bonifacio
- Date: November 30
- Next time: November 30, 2026
- Frequency: annual

Bonifacio Day is a national holiday in the Philippines, commemorating Andrés Bonifacio, one of the country's national heroes. He was the founder and eventual Supremo of the Katipunan, a secret society that triggered the Philippine Revolution of 1896 against the Spanish Empire. It is celebrated every November 30, the birth anniversary of Bonifacio. It also coincides with the feast day of Saint Andrew the Apostle, from whom Bonifacio's given name was derived, as he was born on such day.

== History ==
Since 1901, Bonifacio's birthday has been celebrated by civic organizations. By 1920, Senator Lope K. Santos filed a bill to declare November 30 a holiday. In 1921, the governor general approved the bill as Act No. 2946. The law did not name Bonifacio and added November 30 to the list of holidays listed at Act No. 2711. In time, it became a holiday to commemorate all Filipino heroes; this persisted even when a separate National Heroes' Day holiday was declared in 1931. In 1942, November 30 was declared as National Heroes' Day. In 1952, by that time, the now-independent Philippines, President Elpidio Quirino separated National Heroes' Day and Bonifacio Day by an executive order. Quirino explained in a speech at the National Teachers College that the "change has become necessary because of the interest from different sectors of our country to celebrate each hero's anniversary in order to perpetuate his name."

Unlike Rizal Day which is held on the death anniversary of José Rizal, Bonifacio Day is celebrated on his birth date. This is because of the controversial events on which Bonifacio was executed by his fellow revolutionaries during the time of the Philippine Revolution.

In 2023, Bonifacio Day was commemorated on November 27, as part of the "holiday economics" strategy that shifts the observance of the holiday to the nearest Monday for a longer weekend by virtue of Proclamation No. 90 under President Bongbong Marcos Thus, November 30 was designated as a working day, though traditional celebrations persisted on that day.

== Ceremonies ==
Bonifacio Day ceremonies are usually held at the Bonifacio Monument in Caloocan, and is usually led by the incumbent president. It is also held at places with significance to Bonifacio, especially other monuments of him.

== Protests ==
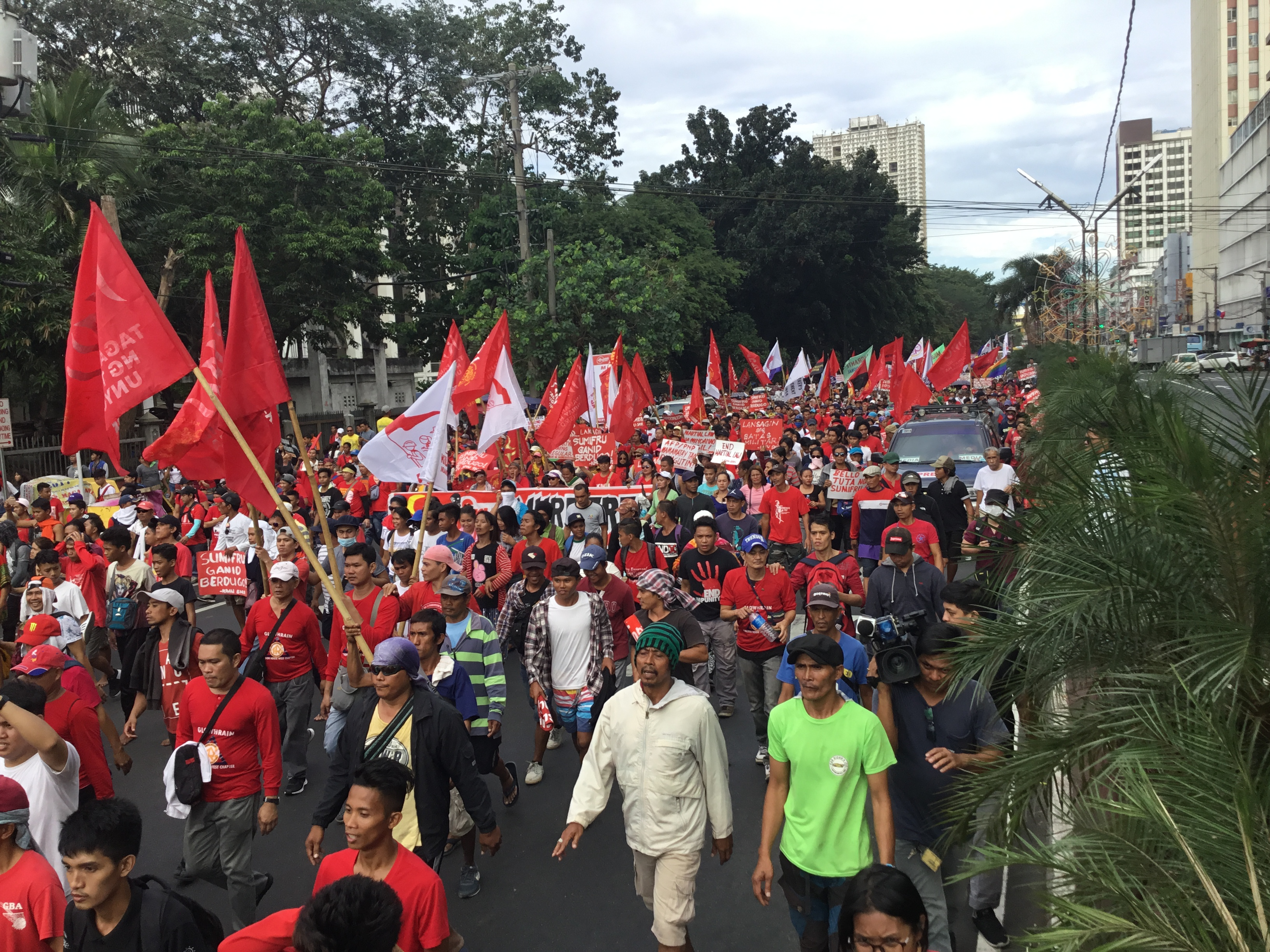
A protest in Manila on Bonifacio Day 2018

Protests calling for government action, often focusing on wage hikes for laborers, are held in the Philippines on Bonifacio Day. Activists believe that "Bonifacio would have supported the right to protest for important causes."

== Bonifacio Days in history ==
On November 30, 1941, days before the Japanese invasion of the Philippines, President Manuel L. Quezon warned of the impending war against the Japanese in a speech at what is now University of the Philippines Manila.
