= 2002 in the Philippines =

- Decades: 1980s; 1990s; 2000s; 2010s; 2020s
- See also: List of years in the Philippines; films

2002 in the Philippines details events of note that happened in the Philippines in the year 2002.

== Incumbents ==
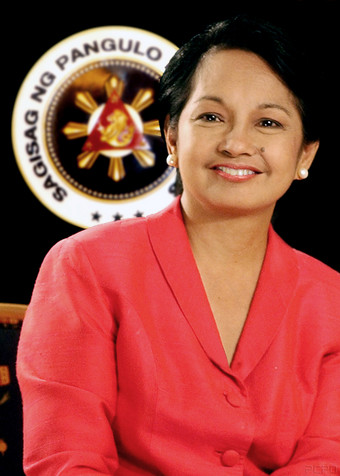
Gloria Macapagal
M. Arroyo

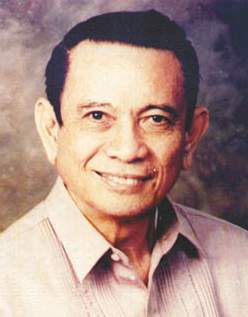
Teofisto T.
Guingona Jr.

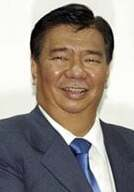
Franklin
M. Drilon

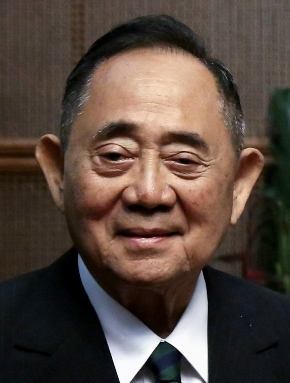
Jose C.
de Venecia Jr.

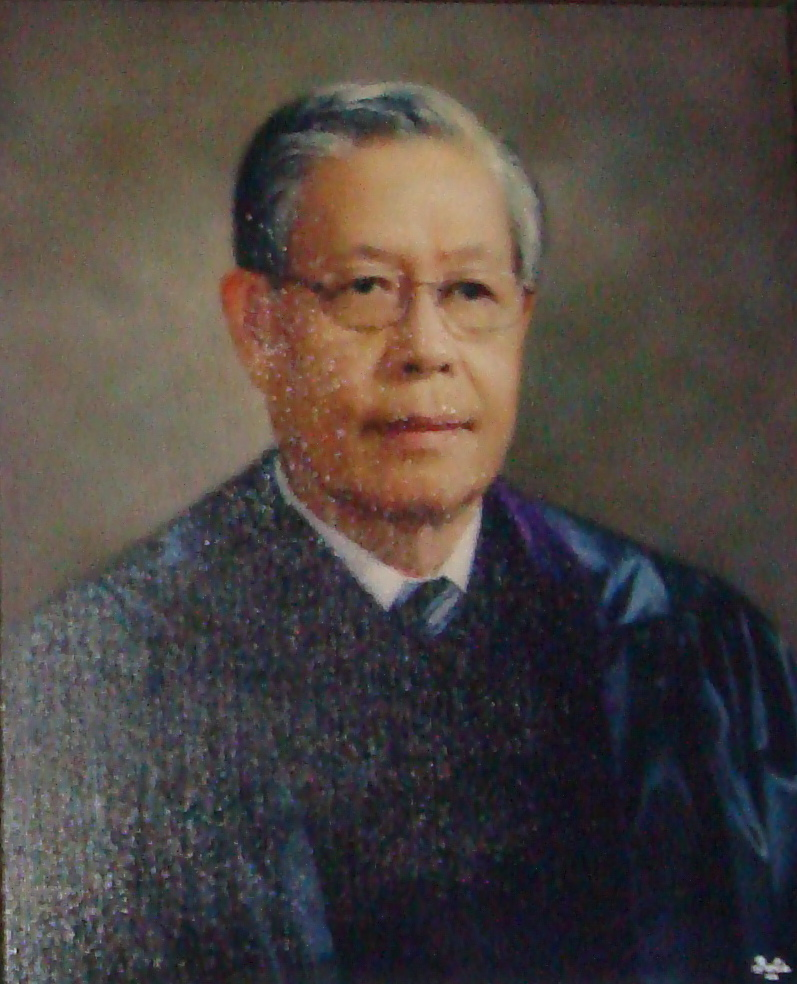
Hilario G.
Davide Jr.

- President – Gloria Macapagal Arroyo (Lakas-CMD)
- Vice President – Teofisto Guingona, Jr. (Lakas)
- Senate President – Franklin Drilon
- House Speaker – Jose de Venecia, Jr.
- Chief Justice – Hilario Davide
- Philippine Congress – 12th Congress of the Philippines

== Events ==
=== January ===
- January 31 – The Sandiganbayan, acting on the motions for reconsideration from the Marcos family, reverses its initial decision in 2000 forfeiting in favor of the government US$658 million worth of Swiss deposits held in escrow in the Philippine National Bank that were declared ill-gotten wealth. This would be set aside in 2003 by the Supreme Court, eventually reaffirming the initial decision.

=== February ===
- February 26 – Former President Joseph Estrada admits signing the ₱500 million Jose Velarde bank account in Equitable-PCI Bank.

=== March ===
- March 6 – An earthquake strikes Mindanao, killing at least 12 people. The world's sixth most powerful of the year, it originates near the Cotabato Trench and registers a magnitude of 7.5.

=== May ===
- May 31 – A two-hour hostage crisis in Philtranco Bus Terminal in Pasay ends with both a four-year-old boy and his hostage-taker killed following a highly televised failed rescue attempt. Homicide charges would be filed against 22 city police officers, including those dismissed, a city police chief and seven of his men.

=== June ===
- June 7 – Philippine Army troops attack Abu Sayyaf in Mindanao in an attempt to rescue the latter's hostages being held since mid-2001. American Gracia Burnham is freed, while her husband Martin, as well as a Filipino hostage and four of the guerrillas, are killed.
- June 18 – 19 – At least 16 members of the Philippine Benevolent Missionaries Association, as well as two from the government forces, die in an overnight clash with combined forces who raided the Ecleo family mansion in San Jose, then part of Surigao del Norte, in their attempt to arrest the cult leader Ruben Jr. A fugitive accused of several murder cases, Ecleo surrenders on the 19th.
- June 21 – Leader of the extremist Abu Sayyaf, Abu Sabaya, is killed by soldiers of the Philippine Army.

=== July ===
- July 15 – Synchronized Barangay and Sangguniang Kabataan elections are held for the first time in the Philippines upon effect of Republic Act No. 9164 which was approved on March 19, 2002, by the 12th Congress of the Philippines.

=== August ===
- August 21 – 22 – Abu Sayyaf kidnaps six Filipino members of a Christian group, two of them later beheaded.

=== October ===
- October 2 – A bomb explosion in front of a Malagutay district karaoke bar near a military arms depot in Zamboanga City killed an American Green Beret commando and three Filipino civilians. At least 25 other people, one of them another American trooper, are wounded in the blast.
- October 17 – Two TNT bombs explode around noon inside a shopping centre in the commercial district of Zamboanga City, killing at least seven and wounding about 150 people. Two department stores are destroyed in the attack.
- October 21 – A Philippine Marine guarding the church is killed and 16 others were wounded after a bomb, placed in bag left at a candle store, explodes at Fort Pilar, a Catholic shrine in Zamboanga City.

=== November ===
- November 11 – Laoag International Airlines Flight 585, a scheduled flight operated by Laoag International Airlines from Manila to Basco via Laoag, crashes into Manila Bay shortly after takeoff from Ninoy Aquino International Airport.

== Holidays ==
As per Executive Order No. 292, chapter 7 section 26, the following are regular holidays and special days, approved on July 25, 1987. The EDSA Revolution Anniversary is proclaimed this year as a special non-working holiday. On November 13, Republic Act No. 9177 declares Eidul Fitr as a regular holiday. Note that in the list, holidays in bold are "regular holidays" and those in italics are "nationwide special days".

- January 1 – **New Year's Day**
- February 25 – EDSA Revolution Anniversary
- March 28 – **Maundy Thursday**
- March 29 – **Good Friday**
- April 9 – **Araw ng Kagitingan (Bataan and Corregidor Day)**
- May 1 – **Labor Day**
- June 12 – **Independence Day**
- August 25 – **National Heroes Day**
- November 1 – All Saints Day
- November 30 – **Bonifacio Day**
- December 5 – **Eidul Fitr**
- December 25 – **Christmas Day**
- December 30 – **Rizal Day**
- December 31 – Last Day of the Year

In addition, several other places observe local holidays, such as the foundation of their town. These are also "special days."

== Sports ==
- May 26 – The Purefoods TJ Hotdogs pull off a rare seven-game sweep after defeating the Alaska Aces, 91–76, in the 2002 PBA Governors' Cup finals at the Araneta Coliseum.
- September 20 – The Red Bull Thunder win their second championship title in the 2002 PBA Commissioner's Cup finals against the Talk 'N Text Phone Pals in seven games.
- September 29 – October 14 – The Philippines participates in the 2002 Asian Games held in Busan, South Korea. The country ranks 18th with three gold medals, seven silver medals and 16 bronze medals with a total of 26 medals.
- October 5 – University Athletic Association of the Philippines men's division finals: The Ateneo Blue Eagles defeat the De La Salle Green Archers to end their 4-year title streak and win their first title in 14 year.
- December 25 – The Coca-Cola Tigers win their 1st PBA title with a 3–1 series victory over the Alaska Aces, with the Tigers becoming the first team to win a championship in their very first season.

== Births ==
- January 16 – Sofia Trazona, drag performer and former P-pop singer
- January 28 – Janine Berdin, actress and singer
- January 31 – Hev Abi, rapper
- February 28 – Ylona Garcia, actress and singer
- March 4 – Alessandrea Carpio, football player
- March 16 – Franchesca Salcedo, actress
- April 5 – Golden Cañedo, singer
- April 11 – Carleigh Frilles, football and futsal player
- April 21 – Carl and Clarence Aguirre, conjoined twins
- April 29 – Karina Bautista, actress and Pinoy Big Brother: Otso contestant
- May 3 – KD Estrada, actor and singer
- May 11 – Kai Sotto, basketball player
- May 15 – Shanaia Gomez, actress and singer
- May 16 – Angela Ken, singer-songwriter and actress
- May 27 – Maloi, singer, dancer, and member of Bini
- June 10 – Belle Mariano, actress and singer
- June 29 – Mhicaela Belen, volleyball player
- July 9 – Seth Fedelin, actor
- August 6 – Bailey May, actor and singer
- August 15 – Bea Millan-Windorski, Filipino-American beauty pageant titleholder
- August 31 – Gabb Skribikin, singer, dancer, and former member of MNL48
- September 3:
  - Bugoy Cariño, actor
  - Kyline Alcantara, actress and singer
- September 24 – Anji Salvacion, actress and singer
- September 25 – Daniela Stranner, actress
- October 6 – Dale Baldillo, Filipino child actor and model
- November 23 – Allen Ansay, actor and basketball player
- December 13 – AC Bonifacio, dancer, singer and actress
- December 15 – Chanty, singer, dancer, actress, and member of Lapillus
- December 18 – Syd Hartha, singer-songwriter
- December 31 – Sophia Laforteza, singer, dancer, and member of Katseye

== Deaths ==
- January 8 – Fely Franquelli, dancer, choreographer, and actress (b. 1916)
- March 29 – Rico Yan, matinee idol, model and actor (b. 1975)
- March 31 – Lucio San Pedro, composer and teacher (b. 1913)
- April 2 – Levi Celerio, composer and lyricist. (b. 1910)
- April 4 – Jack Tanuan, basketball player (b. 1965)
- June 21 – Abu Sabaya, Abu Sayyaf leader and extremist (b. 1962)
- August 1 – Francisco Arcellana, writer, poet, essayist, critic, journalist and teacher (b. 1916)
- September 1 – Martin Urra, basketball player (b. 1931)
- September 22 – Paco Gorospe, painter (b. 1939)
- October 22 – Nonoy Marcelo, cartoonist (b. 1939)
- November 1 – Eduardo Decena, basketball player (b. 1926)
- November 18 – Zaldy Zshornack, actor. (b. 1937)
- December 3 – Santiago Bose, mixed-media artist (b. 1949)

=== Unknown ===
- Rafael Barretto, basketball player (b. 1931)
