= 2000 in the Philippines =

- Decades: 1980s; 1990s; 2000s; 2010s; 2020s
- See also: List of years in the Philippines; films

2000 in the Philippines details events of note that happened in the Philippines in the year 2000.

== Incumbents ==
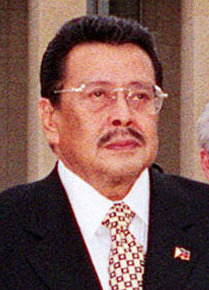
Joseph E.
Estrada

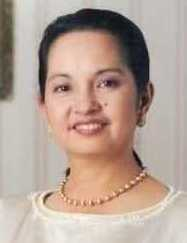
Gloria Macapagal
M. Arroyo

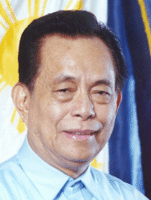
Aquilino Q.
Pimentel Jr.

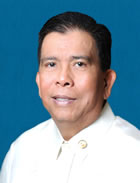
Arnulfo P.
Fuentebella

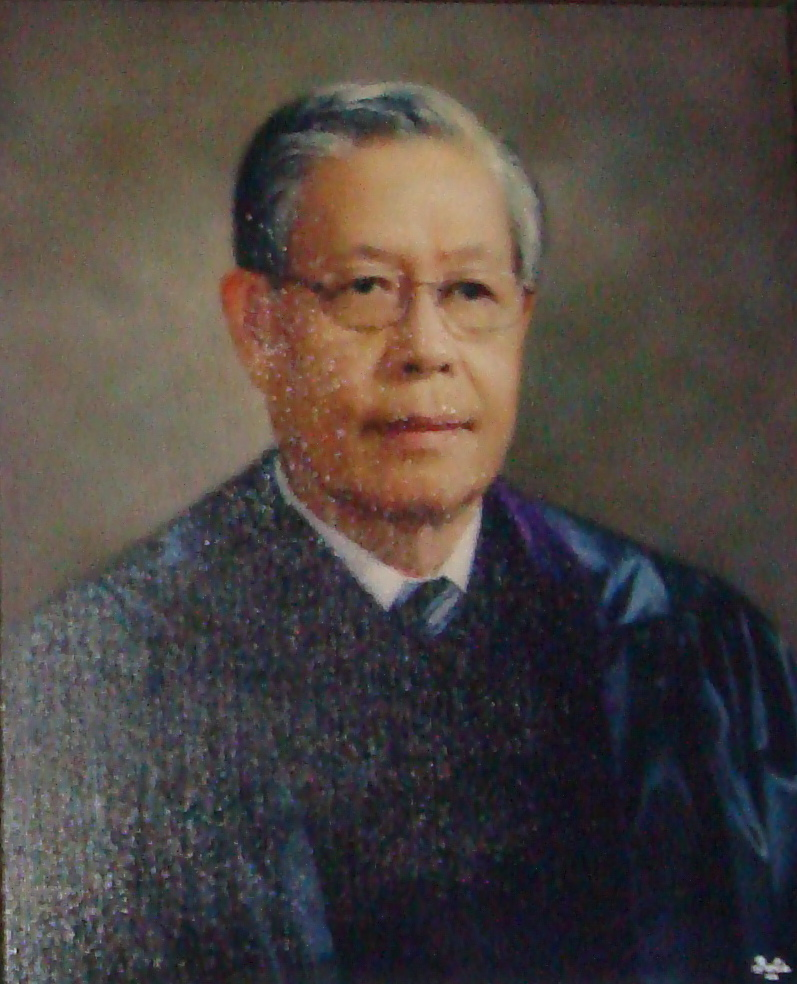
Hilario G.
Davide Jr.

- President: Joseph Estrada (LAMMP)
- Vice President: Gloria Macapagal Arroyo (Lakas)
- Senate President:
  - Blas Ople (until July 12)
  - Franklin Drilon (July 12 – November 13)
  - Aquilino Pimentel Jr. (starting November 13)
- House Speaker
  - Manuel Villar (until November 13)
  - Arnulfo Fuentebella (starting November 13)
- Chief Justice: Hilario Davide
- Philippine Congress: 11th Congress of the Philippines

== Events ==
=== January ===
- January 4 – Rape convict Alex Bartolome is executed by lethal injection at the National Penitentiary in Muntinlupa City, the country's seventh and the last execution since the re-imposition of capital punishment in 1994 and before its abolition in 2006.
- January 6 – The Parañaque City Regional Trial Court, in its decision dated Jan. 4, convicts Hubert Webb and seven others, two of them in absentia, sentencing them to reclusión perpetua in connection to a family murder case in the city in 1991; sentences also a former policeman, convicted of cover-up, to a lower prison term. The ruling would be upheld by the Court of Appeals, but reversed later by the Supreme Court; co-accused Joey Filart and Artemio Ventura remain at large. (Note: On Feb. 17, a man with name Joey Filart is arrested in San Mariano, Isabela; but will later be ordered released by the Department of Justice; he is said to be the same individual mistakenly arrested but cleared in 1995.)

=== February ===
- February 1 – Reports from Cotabato reveal that Norberto Manero Jr., who has been serving prison sentence for the 1985 murder of Italian priest Tullio Favali, has been pardoned by President Estrada in December 1999. Following nationwide protests, the pardon is later eventually revoked, and Manero is jailed in Sarangani for a 1977 murder case.
- February 23–March 7 – Mayon volcano in Albay erupts, with the most violent occurred, February 28 – March 1; its status is raised to the highest, Alert Level 5, on February 24 due to its hazardous explosions with pyroclastic and lahar flows that affected parts of the province, with several thousands evacuated even outside identified danger zones.
- February 25 – In what would be the single deadliest bombing incident in Mindanao, an explosion, allegedly by the Moro Islamic Liberation Front (MILF), occur inside two passenger buses aboard a ferry boat Our Lady of Mediatrix in Ozamiz City, killing at least 45 people and injuring more than 100. Bombings also occur in a bus in Rizal, Zamboanga del Norte and, on February 27, at a radio station in Cotabato City, all are also blamed on the MILF.
- February 28 – An explosion at the gold-rush site at Mt. Diwalwal in Monkayo, Compostela Valley results in the deaths of 11 miners; more than 40 are hospitalized.

=== March ===
- March 16 – MILF rebels led by Commander Bravo attack and occupy Kauswagan, Lanao del Norte and later clash with Government troops, with more than 40 rebels, 9 soldiers and 2 civilians die in the fighting until the town is abandoned by the guerrillas and is retaken by the troops on March 18; the incident is one of the attacks occurred in several municipalities in the Lanao provinces.
- March 20 – Abu Sayyaf Group (ASG) rebels seize more than 50 people in Basilan, including a Roman Catholic priest as well as teachers and students from two schools in Sumisip and Tuburan towns; some of them are held hostage for months.
- March 21 – Pres. Estrada, in his visit in Kauswagan, Lanao del Norte, declares an all-out war against the MILF in Mindanao following rebel attacks in Lanao provinces as a warning to the separation of an Islamic state; ended July 12.

=== April ===
- April 8 – Government troops launch an attack on Camp Belal, a MILF camp in Munai, Lanao del Norte, with 16 rebels and a soldier reportedly killed.
- April 12:
  - At least 69 people are killed when an unlicensed, overloaded wooden ferryboat ML Annahada heading for Tawi-Tawi and Malaysia capsized at sea after leaving a port in Jolo, Sulu, with more than a hundred others missing and feared dead.
  - Armed Forces of the Philippines (AFP) reports that 70 MILF rebels and 23 government troops have died in escalated clashes in some municipalities in Lanao del Norte for the past few days.
- April 16 – A grenade explosion on an intersection in Baclaran, Parañaque City kills eight people and hurts 30 others.
- April 19 – Air Philippines Flight 541 explodes and crashes into a coconut plantation in Island Garden City of Samal, killing all 131 people on board. It is considered as the country's worst aviation accident in history, with fatality count surpassing those from another plane crash in 1998.
- April 22 – Military troops launch an assault against Abu Sayyaf in Camp Abdurajak on Basilan Island, in response to a claim on Apr. 19 that the extremist Muslim rebel group have executed two male teachers, and in an attempt to rescue the hostages who have been held captive for a month; three soldiers and 25 rebels are reportedly killed in the attack; they capture the main rebel camp in the island on April 28.
- April 23 – ASG gunmen seized 21 people including 10 tourists and 11 resort workers, two of them Filipinos, from the resort island of Sipadan, Malaysia. Hostages are brought to the Jolo in the southern Philippines; most of them are released later that year except for a Filipino captive who would escape in 2003.
- April 27 – Army troops capture a MILF camp in Balo-i. Lanao del Norte following a clash that has killed at least 26 guerrillas.

=== May ===
- May 3:
  - Four ASG hostages, including a Roman Catholic priest and 3 teachers are killed during an operation which soldiers rescued 15 another hostages. There are also reports that 5 children have been killed by the ASG and a female teacher has been missing; all among the victims who were kidnapped in March.
  - Twenty-one soldiers and a CAFGU member are killed in an encounter between government troops and the MILF in Matanog, Maguindanao, in what would be the biggest single battle loss suffered by the government during the war.
- May 4:
  - The ILOVEYOU computer virus, originating from the country, is released by a student, spreading quickly throughout the world and damaging around 45 million computers worldwide.
  - A firefight between secessionist MILF and government soldiers occurs in the Lanao del Sur–Maguindanao provincial boundary, when rebels allegedly occupied a highway; ends with the capture of the MILF–BIAF headquarters on May 7, with 108 rebels and 3 Marine soldiers died within two days.
- May 6 – Six persons are killed and 37 others are wounded in separate bus explosions in Surigao and Butuan cities.
- May 7 – An Army Special Forces unit in Lantawan, Basilan, searching for ASG hostages taken in March, is ambushed by the bandits, killing 13 of its soldiers.
- May 16 – An explosion in Glorietta Mall in Makati injures 13 persons.
- May 21 – An explosion and a stampede in SM Megamall in Mandaluyong kills one person and injures at least 11 others.
- May 25:
  - A Philippine Airlines Flight 812 is hijacked by a man, later identified as Augusto Lakandula, just before its landing at Manila. The suspect, who robbed passengers and attempted to jump out of the plane while in Antipolo, is found dead in a forest in Real, Quezon at night.
  - Philippine peso closes to ₱43.40 per US dollar, the lowest since October 1998.
- Late May – At least 33 MILF rebels and three government soldiers die in a clash in Marogong, Lanao del Sur.

=== June ===
- June 21 – The PBCom Tower, the tallest building in the country upon its completion, opens.
- June 27 – Thirteen soldiers are killed when New People's Army (NPA) rebels ambushed a convoy of military medical personnel in Jones, Isabela.

=== July ===
- July 1 – Televangelist Wilde Almeda and 11 other preachers from Jesus Miracle Crusade are abducted by ASG bandits as they went to a rebel camp in Jolo, Sulu. They are rescued on October 2 after being held hostage.
- July 2 – A Philippine Air Force (PAF) aircraft crashes into the Sulu Sea, off Cagayancillo, Palawan, after experiencing engine failure on its takeoff, killing 11 of the 12 people on board including an Armed Forces of the Philippines (AFP) official and a provincial governor.
- July 9 – AFP captures from the MILF its main camp, Camp Abubakar in Maguindanao, after a week-long military attack, as part of a campaign against Moro insurgency in Mindanao.
- July 10 – Hundreds of shanties are buried in a collapse of a dumpsite, destabilized by torrential rains caused by tropical cyclones, in Payatas, Quezon City; 234 people are confirmed killed, as high as 800 are missing and presumed dead.
- July 16 – About a hundred armed men, suspected to be MILF rebels, attack a village in Bumbaran, Lanao del Sur, kill 21 Christian residents inside a mosque, and go on a shooting rampage that injures 11 people.

=== August ===
- August 4 – An attack by heavily armed men on a road in Cotabato occurs; 16 people are killed and 10 others are seriously injured.
- August 10 – Maasin, Southern Leyte becomes a city through ratification in a plebiscite of RA 8796 which was approved on July 11.
- August 11 – A clash between the government forces and a religious cult locally known as Tadtad in Pangantucan, Bukidnon results in deaths of at least 16 cult members and 4 from the troops.
- August 21 – NPA guerillas ambush a group of army soldiers in Himamaylan, Negros Occidental, killing 17 of them.

=== September ===
- September 8 – Digos becomes a component city in the province of Davao del Sur through ratification of Republic Act 8798.
- September 10 – San Jose del Monte becomes a component city in the province of Bulacan through ratification of Republic Act 8797.
- September 18:
  - Bislig becomes a component city in the province of Surigao del Sur through ratification of Republic Act 8804.
  - Tacurong becomes a component city in the province of Sultan Kudarat through ratification of Republic Act 8805.
- September 19 – The Sandiganbayan declares that the escrow fund in the Philippine National Bank amounting US$627 million (January 2002), allegedly kept by the Marcos family in Swiss accounts, belongs to the government, forfeiting them to the latter. The decision would be reversed in 2002, but reinstated by the Supreme Court in 2003.
- September 30 – Masbate becomes a component city in the province of Masbate through ratification of Republic Act 8807.

=== October ===
- October 4 – Luis Singson exposes Pres. Estrada's alleged links to illegal gambling; followed by a privilege speech of Sen. Teofisto Guingona in Senate.
- October 8 – Koronadal becomes a component city in the province of South Cotabato through ratification of Republic Act 8803.
- October 18 – An impeachment complaint is filed by the opposition groups, with House of Representatives, against Pres. Estrada.
- October 20 – A massive power outage affects most parts of Luzon including Metro Manila, caused by system failures in the transmission lines of the National Power Corporation in Pangasinan and Bulacan; electricity was fully restored 16 hours later.

=== November ===
- November 13 – The House of Representatives votes to impeach Pres. Estrada, with impeachment case filed against him regarding his alleged links to illegal gambling.

=== December ===
- December 7 – Impeachment trial against Pres. Estrada begins at the Senate; the first for an Asian head of state. Its last day would be on January 16, 2001; trial aborted, Jan. 17.
- December 9 – Muñoz, Nueva Ecija becomes a city through ratification in a plebiscite of RA 8977 which was approved on November 7; the first Science City in the country and in Southeast Asia.
- December 15 – At least eleven members of the Pulahan sect are killed in a clash with a rival group, the Philippine Benevolent Missionaries Association, in San Jose, then part of Surigao del Norte.
- December 16 – Sorsogon becomes a component city in the province of Sorsogon through ratification of Republic Act 8806.
- December 23 – Bayawan becomes a component city in the province of Negros Occidental through ratification of Republic Act 8983.
- December 25 – At least 45 people died when a bus falls into a ravine after being hit by another bus in Bansalan, Davao del Sur.
- December 30:
  - Multiple simultaneous terrorist bombings in Metro Manila, occurring on Rizal Day, kill 22 people and injure more than 120 others. In 2009, three of those involved in the attacks would be sentenced to life imprisonment.
  - Balanga, Bataan becomes a city through ratification of RA 8984 which was approved on December 5.
  - Talisay becomes a component city in the province of Cebu through ratification of Republic Act 8979.

== Holidays ==
As per Executive Order No. 292, chapter 7 section 26, the following are regular holidays and special days, approved on July 25, 1987. Note that in the list, holidays in bold are "regular holidays" and those in italics are "nationwide special days".

- January 1 – **New Year's Day**
- April 9 – **Araw ng Kagitingan** (Day of Valor)
- April 20 – **Maundy Thursday**
- April 21 – **Good Friday**
- May 1 – **Labor Day**
- June 12 – **Independence Day**
- August 27 – **National Heroes Day**
- November 1 – All Saints Day
- November 30 – **Bonifacio Day**
- December 25 – **Christmas Day**
- December 30 – **Rizal Day**
- December 31 – Last Day of the Year

In addition, several other places observe local holidays, such as the foundation of their town. These are also "special days."

== Sports ==
- January 31 – The Welcoat House Paints won the third straight PBL title in the 1999–2000 2nd Yakult-PBL Challenge Cup after beating Ana Water Dispenser in Finals Game 3, 58–56.
- February 11–13 The Philippines hosting the 2000 Asian Beach Volleyball Championship held from February 11 to 13, 2000 in Pasay, Philippines
- March 5 – Negros Occidental becomes the overall champion in the inaugural Palaro ng Bayan, held in General Santos, winning a total of 67 medals including 31 golds.
- June 11 – The Alaska Milkmen won their third PBA All-Filipino crown in the last five years with a 4–1 series victory over Purefoods TJ Hotdogs. The title-conquest was their 10th championship.
- June 27 – The Welcoat Paint Masters won their fourth straight title of the Philippine Basketball League after they beaten the Shark Energy Drink at the 2000 PBL Chairman's Cup held at Makati Coliseum.
- August 6 – The 2000 ABC-PBA All-Star Game is the All-Star game was held on August 6, 2000, at the Philsports Arena in Pasig.
- August 24–27 – The Philippines hosts the 2000 FIVB World Grand Prix at the Araneta Coliseum in Quezon City.
- September 12–17 – Dagupan City was hosting the 2000 Asian Junior Women's Volleyball Championship was held in Dagupan City.
- September 15–October 1 – The Philippines participated in the 2000 Summer Olympics in Sydney, Australia by sending a delegation of 20 members. But all of the athletes lost in the said event and did not home their medals.
- September 15 – The San Miguel Beermen claim their 14th PBA crown by winning against Sta. Lucia Realtors in five games. The Realtors were on their first finals appearance since joining the league in 1993.
- November 25 – The San Juan Knights defeated Negros Slashers, 104–91 in Game Six, at the San Juan Gym for their first MBA national title.
- December 20 – The San Miguel Beermen retains the PBA Governors Cup title and captured their 15th PBA crown, defeating Purefoods TJ Hotdogs in their finals series, four games to one

== Births ==
=== January ===
- January 1 – A. J. Edu, basketball player
- January 2 – Faith Nisperos, volleyball player

=== February ===
- February 16 – Carlos Yulo, artistic gymnast
- February 21 – Andrew Julian Romualdez, businessman and politician
- February 23 – Lexi Gonzales, actress, dancer and singer
- February 26 – Alexa Ilacad, actress, host and singer

=== March ===
- March 1 – Nikki Samonte, model and singer
- March 2 – Bianca Umali, actress and dancer
- March 8 – Thea Astley, singer, actress and host
- March 9 – Emilio Daez, actor and host
- March 12 – Sabrina Man, actress

=== April ===
- April 7 – Vincent Magbanua, actor
- April 14 – Alexia Blanco, football player
- April 17 – Kaya Hawkinson, football player
- April 21 – Taki Saito, actress, performer, and host
- April 28 – Sela Guia, actress and former member of MNL48

=== June ===
- June 3 – Beabadoobee, singer and songwriter
- June 25 – Dionesa Tolentin, football and futsal player

=== July ===
- July 1 – Kiara Fontanilla, football player
- July 15 – Edward Barber, actor
- July 22 – Kaori Oinuma, actress
- July 28 – Kaitlin De Guzman, artistic gymnast

=== August ===
- August 3:
  - Vivoree Esclito, actress and singer
  - Kira Balinger, actress and singer
  - Melizza Jimenez, actress, model and singer
- August 10 – Ace Banzuelo, singer
- August 16 – Elijah Canlas, actor, singer and songwriter
- August 21 – Kate Valdez, actress

=== September ===
- September 16 – Therese Malvar, actress
- September 24 – Rhea Chan, football and futsal player

=== October ===
- October 6 – Dale Baldillo, actor
- October 26 – Mika Salamanca, actress, singer, and media personality

=== November ===
- November 1 – Anthony Jennings, actor

=== December ===
- December 5 – Vanie Gandler, volleyball player
- December 11 – Santino Rosales, football player and model
- December 12 – Brace Arquiza, actor and model
- December 16 – Kakie, singer-songwriter

== Deaths ==
=== January ===
- January 22 – Teodoro Locsin Sr., journalist. (b. 1914)

=== March ===
- March 20 – Ramon Mitra, Jr., chief of the Philippine National Oil Company; House Speaker (1987–1992) and former senator (b. 1928)

=== April ===
- April 8 – Alfredo Alcala, Filipino comic book artist (b. 1925)
- April 11 – Salvador Lazo Lazo, Filipino prelate of the Roman Catholic Church (b. 1918)
- April 25 – Jun Aristorenas, Filipino actor, director, dancer, producer and writer (b. 1933)

=== May ===
- May 3 – Rhoel Gallardo, C.M.F., Catholic priest (b. 1965)
- May 11 – Cipriano Bautista, mayor of Navotas. (b. 1929)
- May 15 – Roberto Benedicto, businessman. (b. 1917)
- May 28 – Francisco Vestil, Filipino basketball player (b. 1914)

=== June ===
- June 11 – Sarah Jane Salazar, Filipino AIDS activist and educator (b. 1975)

=== September ===
- September 27 – Pablo Cuneta, Filipino politician, former Mayor of Pasay and father of Sharon Cuneta (b. 1910)
- September 29 – Maningning Miclat, Filipino poet and painter (b. 1972)

=== November ===
- November 24 – Bubby Dacer, Publicist (b. 1934)

=== December ===
- December 4 – Tito Arévalo, Filipino actor and musician (b. 1914)

=== Unknown ===
- Valeriano Abello (b. 1913)
