= 2004 in the Philippines =

- Decades: 1980s; 1990s; 2000s; 2010s; 2020s
- See also: List of years in the Philippines; films

2004 in the Philippines details events of note that happened in the Philippines in the year 2004.

== Incumbents ==
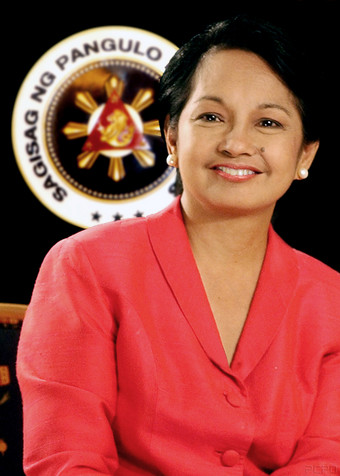
Gloria Macapagal
M. Arroyo

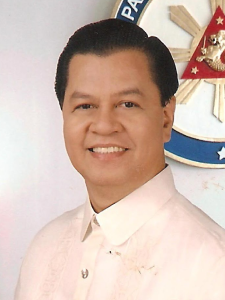
Noli L.
de Castro Jr.

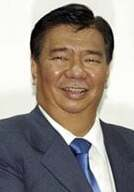
Franklin
M. Drilon

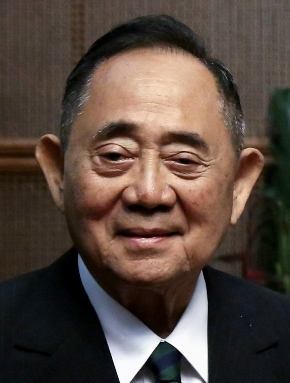
Jose C.
de Venecia Jr.

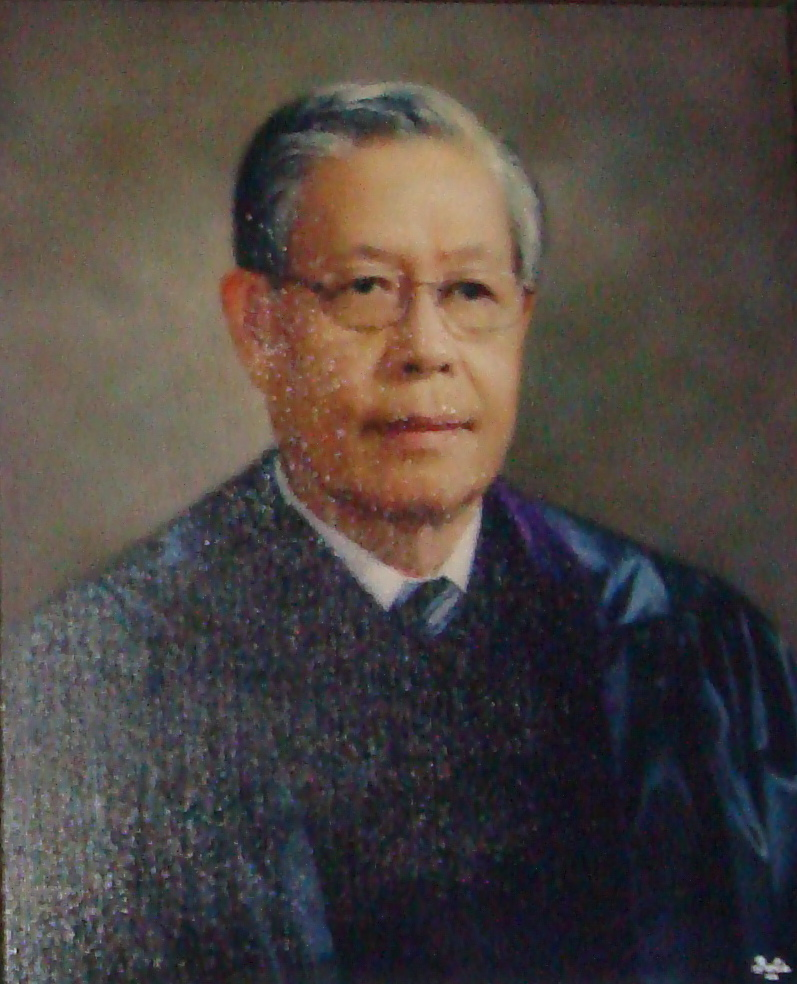
Hilario G.
Davide Jr.

- President: Gloria Macapagal Arroyo (Lakas-CMD)
- Vice President
  - Teofisto Guingona (Independent) (until June 30)
  - Noli de Castro (Independent) (starting June 30)
- Senate President: Franklin Drilon
- House Speaker: Jose de Venecia
- Chief Justice: Hilario Davide
- Philippine Congress
  - 12th Congress of the Philippines (until June 4)
  - 13th Congress of the Philippines (starting July 26)

== Events ==
=== February ===
- February 27 – A bomb planted by Abu Sayyaf cayses a fire on the passenger ferry SuperFerry 14 off El Fraile island, shortly after leaving Manila harbor, killing at least 116 people. It is considered as the country's worst terrorist attack. Redondo Cain Dellosa, an RSM member and among the alleged main perpetrators, would be later arrested after almost a month. It is believed that senior ASG leaders Khadafi Janjalani and Abu Solaiman, both later killed separately, are the masterminds.

=== May ===
- May 10:
  - Synchronized national and local elections are held. This was the first election participated by Overseas Filipinos under the Overseas Absentee Voting Act of 2003
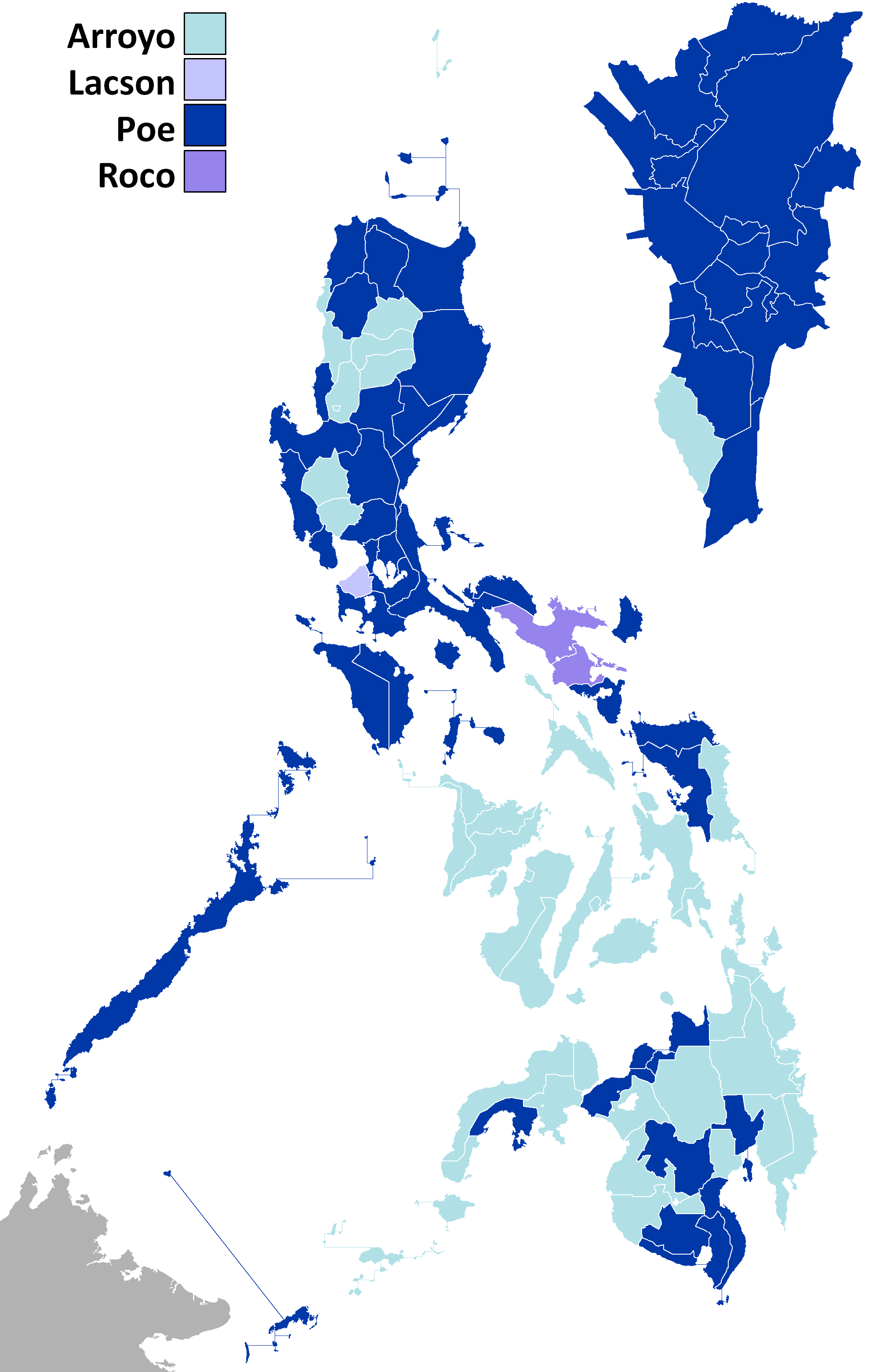
    The colors indicate provinces where a candidate gathered the majority of votes: White Blue for Arroyo, Orange for Poe, Dark Blue for Lacson, and Pink for Roco. Villanueva was unable to secure a majority in any of the provinces.
  - Gloria Macapagal Arroyo is re-elected in presidential elections.

=== June ===
- June 30 – Gloria Macapagal Arroyo is inaugurated in Cebu City, along with Noli de Castro as president and vice president, respectively.

=== July ===
- July 7–20 – Angelo dela Cruz, an Overseas Filipino working as a truck driver is abducted by the Iraqi insurgents near the Iraqi city of Fallujah. He is released after the Philippine Government moves up its withdrawal of troops in Iraq as an answer to the demand of his captors. Dela Cruz is released on July 20 and returns home the day after.
- July 10 – Santa Rosa becomes a component city in the province of Laguna through ratification of Republic Act 9264.
- July 23 – SAI building, a 5-year-old eight-story building on Padre Rada Street, collapses in the heart of busy Divisoria in Manila at 4:40 pm, crashing down on Italy Marketing building across the street.

=== November ===
- November 14–December 4 – Typhoons Unding, Violeta, Winnie and Yoyong hit the Philippines, leaving at least 1,060 people dead, more than 560 missing and 850,000 displaced.
- November 16 – The Hacienda Luisita massacre occurs, leaving twelve picketing farmers and two children killed and hundreds injured when police and soldiers dispatched by Labor Secretary Patricia Santo Tomas storm a blockade by plantation workers.

=== December ===
- December 8 – Taguig becomes a highly urbanized city in Metro Manila through Republic Act 8487 which was enacted since December 8, 1998, following a recount of votes granted by the Supreme Court.
- December 12 – A bombing in the main public market in General Santos kills at least 15 people and injures 69 others. Several persons, including Indonesian suspected members of JI and a former member of MILF, would be arrested in connection with the incident.

== Holidays ==
On November 13, 2002, Republic Act No. 9177 declares Eidul Fitr as a regular holiday. The EDSA Revolution Anniversary was proclaimed since 2002 as a special non-working holiday. In the list, holidays in bold are "regular holidays" and those in italics are "nationwide special days".

- January 1 – **New Year's Day**
- February 25 – EDSA Revolution Anniversary
- April 8 – **Maundy Thursday**
- April 9:
  - **Good Friday**
  - **Araw ng Kagitingan** (Day of Valor)
- May 1 – **Labor Day**
- June 12 – **Independence Day**
- August 21 – **Ninoy Aquino Day**
- August 29 – **National Heroes Day**
- November 1 – All Saints Day
- November 13 – **Eidul Fitr**
- November 30 – **Bonifacio Day**
- December 25 – **Christmas Day**
- December 30 – **Rizal Day**
- December 31 – Last Day of the Year

In addition, several other places observe local holidays, such as the foundation of their town. These are also "special days."

== Sports ==
- May 9 – Manny Pacquiao and Juan Manuel Marquez's boxing match ends in a split draw
- July 7 – The Barangay Ginebra Kings end a seven-year title drought with a 3-1 finals series win over Red Bull Barako in the Fiesta Conference Finals
- August 13–29 – The Philippines competes at the 2004 Summer Olympics in Athens, Greece.
- September 30 – De La Salle Green Archers defeat the FEU Tamaraws in the Best-of-3 Finals in the UAAP Season 67 Men's Basketball

== Births ==
- January 26 – Jhoanna Robles, singer, dancer, and member of Bini
- January 27:
  - Francine Diaz, actress
  - Xyriel Manabat, actress
- March 3 – Izzy Canillo, actor
- March 8 – Brenna Garcia, actress
- March 26 – Awra Briguela, actor
- April 16 – Elha Nympha, singer
- May 9 – Sheena Catacutan, singer, dancer, and member of Bini
- May 18 – Olive May actress
- May 29 – Noel Comia Jr. actor and former host of Team Yey!
- June 23 – Nina Meollo, football player
- July 14 – Barbara Miguel, actress
- August 8 – Miggs Cuaderno, actor
- August 19 – Mona Louise Rey, actress and commercial model
- September 1 – Mallie Ramirez, football player
- October 6 – Cha-Cha Cañete, actress
- October 9 – Althea Ablan, actress
- November 13 – Elijah Alejo, actress
- November 14 – Rabin Angeles, actor and influencer
- November 21 – Lyca Gairanod, singer and actress
- December 10 – Gwyn Dorado, singer
- December 15 – Clarence Delgado, actor

== Deaths ==
- January 2 – Maria Clara Lobregat, former mayor and congresswoman of Zamboanga City (b. 1921)
- January 19 – Herminio A. Astorga, vice-mayor of Manila (b. 1929)
- January 27 – Salvador Laurel, former Vice President under the Aquino Administration (b. 1928)
- February 18 – Frankie Evangelista, former radio-TV anchor (b. 1934)
- February 21 – Nestor de Villa, former actor (b. 1928)
- March 4 – Halina Perez, former sexy star (b. 1981)
- April 8 – Hamsiraji Marusi Sali, terrorist
- April 27 – Larry Silva, former actor and comedian (b. 1937)
- April 29 – Nick Joaquin, writer/historian/journalist (born 1917)
- May 5:
  - José Maceda, composer and ethnomusicologist. (b. 1917)
  - Teddy Alfarero, former basketball player (b. 1963)
- May 13 – Vicatan, comic book artist and novelist (b. 1948)
- May 17 – Enrique Zobel, businessman and polo player. (b. 1927)
- June 10 – Voltaire Y. Rosales, Executive Judge (b. 1956)
- July 3 – Mamintal M. Adiong Sr., former Governor of Lanao del Sur (b. 1936)
- August 2 – Arturo Tolentino, former Vice President (b. 1910)
- August 14 – Bomber Moran, former actor (b. 1944)
- August 17 – Luz Magsaysay, wife of President Ramon Magsaysay and the seventh First Lady of the Philippines. (b. 1914)
- August 30 – Dely Atay-Atayan, former comedian (b. 1914)
- October 4 – Rio Diaz, former TV host/actress/beauty queen (b. 1959)
- October 13 – Enrique Fernando, 13th Chief Justice of the Supreme Court of the Philippines (b. 1915)
- October 28 – Edgardo Fulgencio, Olympic Basketball Player (b. 1917)
- November 10 – Katy de la Cruz, singer, actress, known as "Queen of Bodabil" (b. 1907)
- November 19 – George Canseco, song composer (b. 1934)
- December 7 – Pacita Abad, painter (b. 1946)
- December 14 – Fernando Poe, Jr., actor and politician (b. 1939)
