= 2001 in the Philippines =

- Decades: 1980s; 1990s; 2000s; 2010s; 2020s
- See also: List of years in the Philippines; films

2001 in the Philippines details events of note that happened in the Philippines in the year 2001.

== Incumbents ==
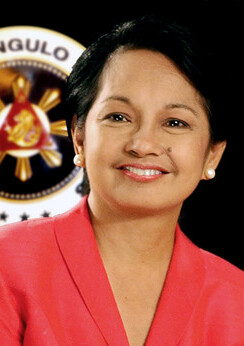
Gloria Macapagal
M. Arroyo

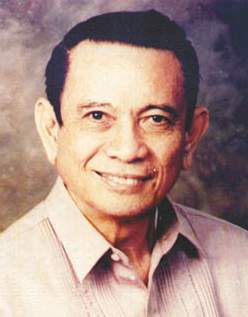
Teofisto T.
Guingona Jr.

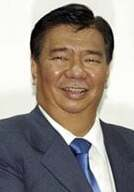
Franklin
M. Drilon

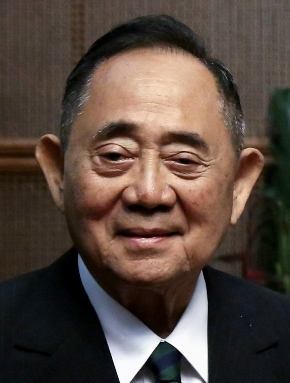
Jose C.
de Venecia Jr.

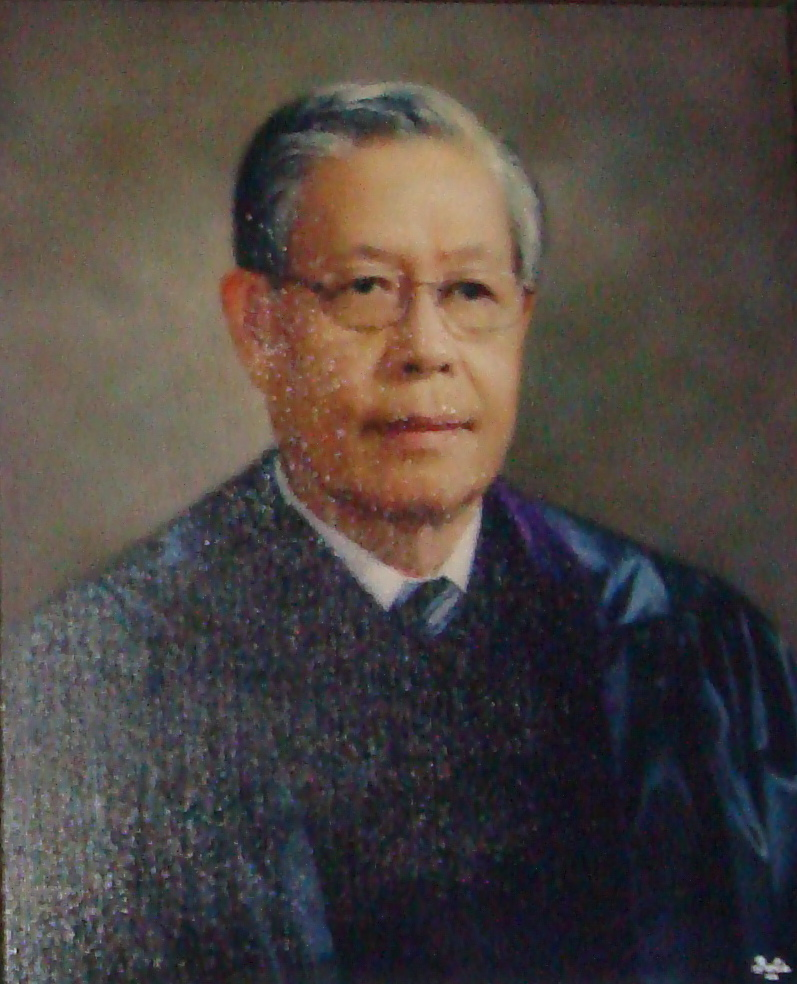
Hilario G.
Davide Jr.

- President
  - Joseph Estrada (LAMMP) (until January 20)
  - Gloria Macapagal Arroyo (Lakas) (starting January 20)
- Vice President
  - Gloria Macapagal Arroyo (Lakas) (until January 20)
  - Teofisto Guingona (Lakas) (starting February 7)
- Senate President:
  - Aquilino Pimentel (until June 30)
  - Franklin Drilon (starting June 30)
- House Speaker:
  - Arnulfo Fuentabella (until January 24)
  - Feliciano Belmonte, Jr. (January 24-June 30)
  - Jose C. de Venecia, Jr. (starting July 23)
- Chief Justice: Hilario Davide, Jr.
- Philippine Congress
  - 11th Congress of the Philippines (until June 8)
  - 12th Congress of the Philippines (starting July 23)

== Events ==
=== January ===
- January 12 – Valencia becomes a component city in the province of Bukidnon through ratification of Republic Act 8985.
- January 16 – After 11 senators voted not to open an envelope containing potentially incriminating documents against President Estrada, the prosecutors walk out.
- January 17 – 20 – Second EDSA Revolution. Millions of people march in the streets of EDSA for a peaceful protest against President Estrada for being accused of plunder.
- January 20:
  - Vice President Gloria Macapagal Arroyo takes the oath of office as the 14th president of the Philippines. She is considered as the second female president after Corazon Aquino.
  - Estrada steps down as the 13th President of the Philippines from his office at Malacañang Palace.
- January 22 – Vigan becomes a component city in the province of Ilocos Sur through ratification of Republic Act 8988.

=== February ===
- February 3 – San Fernando becomes a city in the province of Pampanga through ratification of Republic Act 8990 which was approved on January 26.
- February 22 – Zamboanga Sibugay becomes a province in the region of Zamboanga Peninsula through ratification of Republic Act 8973 which was approved on November 7, 2000.

=== March ===
- March 10 – Tanauan becomes a component city in the province of Batangas through ratification of Republic Act 9005.
- March 19:
  - Twelve people die after a Manila-bound cargo truck collides with a Cabanatuan-bound RamTrans passenger bus in the North Luzon Expressway in Bocaue, Bulacan.
  - Fourteen others are killed as a speeding Shell fuel tanker, heading for Cavite, crashes into five jeeps and pedestrians and causes a fire along Coastal Road in Parañaque.
- March 24
  - Ligao becomes a component city in the province of Albay through ratification of Republic Act 9008.
  - Tabaco becomes a component city in the province of Albay through ratification of Republic Act 9020
- March 28
  - Alaminos becomes a component city in the province of Pangasinan through ratification of Republic Act 9025.
  - Candon becomes a component city in the province of Ilocos Sur through ratification of Republic Act 9018.
- March 30
  - Cauayan becomes a component city in the province of Isabela through ratification of Republic Act 9017.
  - Voters of the municipality of Meycauayan in the province of Bulacan reject the cityhood law under the Republic Act 9021 which sought to convert the town into a component city.
- March 31
  - Escalante becomes a component city in the province of Negros Occidental through ratification of Republic Act 9014.
  - Himamaylan becomes a component city in the province of Negros Occidental through ratification of Republic Act 9028.
  - Panabo becomes a component city in the province of Davao del Norte through ratification of Republic Act 9015.
  - Sipalay becomes a component city in the province of Negros Occidental through ratification of Republic Act 9027.

=== April ===
- April 21
  - Calamba becomes a component city in the province of Laguna through ratification of Republic Act 9024.
  - Malabon becomes a highly urbanized city in Metro Manila through ratification of Republic Act 9019.
- April 25
  - Estrada is arrested in San Juan following a protest by his supporters and detained at Camp Crame.
  - Isabela becomes a component city in the province of Basilan through ratification of Republic Act 9023.

=== May ===
- May 1 – Estrada supporters attack Malacañang Palace following a riot, killing many and several others were rounded up by the police.
- May 14 – Legislative and local elections are held nationwide.
- May 27 – Twenty individuals, among them 13 tourists and 3 staff members, are seized by the Abu Sayyaf Group (ASG) guerrillas from an island resort in Palawan, and are taken to Basilan; some of them are killed; crisis lasts about 12 months. The captives include Americans Guellermo Sobero, who would be found dead in October, and the Burnhams, missionaries who would remain in captivity until a rescue attempt in June 2002.

=== June ===
- June 1–3 – Series of battles in Basilan between the military and the Abu Sayyaf leave two deaths, while nine of the hostages from Palawan escape. The guerrillas seize the hospital in Lamitan, wherein they took additional hostages.

=== August ===
- August 2 – ASG members attack a predominantly Christian village in Lamitan, Basilan, with 11 of 32 kidnapped villagers killed.
- August 18 – A fire sweeps through the Manor Hotel in Quezon City, killing at least 68 people.
- August 25 – Gapan becomes a city in the province of Nueva Ecija through ratification of Republic Act 9022 which was approved on March 5.

=== November ===
- November 17 – New People's Army guerrillas ambush an Army Special Forces platoon in Cateel, Davao Oriental; 18 government troopers and 10 NPA rebels are killed.
- November 19–24 – Hundreds of followers of Nur Misuari, renegade outgoing governor of the Autonomous Region in Muslim Mindanao (ARMM) and former head of the then-disbanded secessionist group Moro National Liberation Front (MNLF), attack an army base in Jolo, Sulu, killing four soldiers and seven civilians. Later that day, fighting between more than 7,000 troops and about 600 former MNLF rebels ensued; with major attacks launched throughout the Sulu mainland, particularly in Panamao, Patikul and Indanan; as a result, the attack is repulsed and at least 113 people, mostly rebels, are killed, reportedly mostly from air strikes. Misuari later escapes, and after being charged of rebellion along with faction leaders of the Abu Sayyaf, on November 24, along with six followers, is captured at Jampiras Island in Sabah, Malaysia.
- November 19–29 – Another group of Misuari partisans under his nephew Julhambri begin to occupy the Cabatangan complex, the ARMM satellite office in Zamboanga City. On November 27, a massive military assault forces the rebels to leave the facility as they capture up to at least 118 hostages, and meet up with other Misuari followers in another barangay; thirty rebels, a soldier and a civilian are killed in a standoff. The rebels release the hostages until November 28 through their agreement with the government, in exchange for their safe evacuation to a MNLF camp in the outskirts of the city; ending a hostage crisis. On November 29, a number of MNLF holdouts attacked troops at the said complex; six of them are captured. (Note: According to a news report by The Philippine Star, the number of MNLF rebels involved in the Zamboanga City siege, originally at some 60, later increases to 200 prior to the November 27 military attack; another report later states more than 300. Meanwhile, that of holdouts involved in another fighting ranges from 30 to 40.)
- November 26 – Elections are held in ARMM, where very low voter turnout is observed. In Sulu, local officials of the Commission on Elections open polling booths despite order from its main headquarters to postpone it. The elections have been denounced by Misuari as a violation of the 1996 peace accord.

== Holidays ==
As per Executive Order No. 292, chapter 7 section 26, the following are regular holidays and special days, approved on July 25, 1987. Note that in the list, holidays in bold are "regular holidays" and those in italics are "nationwide special days".

- January 1 – **New Year's Day**
- April 9 – **Araw ng Kagitingan** (Day of Valor)
- April 12 – **Maundy Thursday**
- April 13 – **Good Friday**
- May 1 – **Labor Day**
- June 12 – **Independence Day**
- August 26 – **National Heroes Day**
- November 1 – All Saints Day
- November 30 – **Bonifacio Day**
- December 25 – **Christmas Day**
- December 30 – **Rizal Day**
- December 31 – Last Day of the Year

In addition, several other places observe local holidays, such as the foundation of their town. These are also "special days."

== Business and economy ==
- September – Digital Mobile Philippines launches Sun Cellular to provide wireless public and private telecommunications services.

== Sports ==
- March 30–April 1 – The Philippines hosts the 2001 Asian Beach Volleyball Championship.
- May 18 – The San Miguel Beermen wins their 16th PBA title, winning their finals series against the Barangay Ginebra Kings in game 6 of the 2001 PBA All-Filipino Cup.
- August 24 – Batang Red Bull Thunder wins the Commissioner's Cup title in only their second season and fifth conference. The Thunder defeats San Miguel Beermen in Game Six for a 4–2 series victory.
- September 8–17 – The Philippines competes at the 2001 Southeast Asian Games in Kuala Lumpur, Malaysia.
- December 16 – The Sta. Lucia Realtors win their first-ever PBA title after eight years of participation in the league, winning over defending champions San Miguel Beermen in six games.

== Births ==
- January 6:
  - Cassy Legaspi, actress
  - Mavy Legaspi, actor
- January 23 – Camille Sahirul, football player
- January 27 – Aiah, model, singer, and member of Bini
- February 5 – Juan Karlos Labajo, singer
- February 13 – Carl Tamayo, basketball player
- February 15 – Angeli Nicole Sanoy, actress
- March 28 – Alas Alvarez, singer, songwriter, producer, and member of Alamat
- April 18 – Gelo Rivera, internet personality
- April 22 – Kevin Quiambao, basketball player
- April 27 – Akira Morishita, actor, singer, and member of BGYO
- May 13 – Dustin Yu, actor
- May 24 – Darren Espanto, singer
- June 4 – Shuvee Etrata, actress and model
- July 16 – Ivymae Perez, former football player
- August 3 – Angeli Khang, actress and former model
- August 16 – Lianne Valentin, actress
- August 23 – Zaijian Jaranilla, actor
- September 6 – Janae DeFazio, football player
- September 14 – Colet, singer, songwriter, and member of Bini
- October 5 - Julia Coronel, volleyball player
- October 18 – Rans Rifol, former member of MNL48
- October 24 – Joaquin Domagoso, actor and politician
- October 31 – Amy Nobleza, singer and actress
- November 5:
  - Andres Muhlach, media personality
  - Atasha Muhlach, media personality
- November 7 – Grae Fernandez, actor
- December 6 – Zack Tabudlo, singer and songwriter
- December 14 – Alyssa Solomon, volleyball player

== Deaths ==
- March 10 – Arturo Alcaraz, volcanologist (b. 1916)
- March 13 – Encarnacion Alzona, historian, educator and suffragist. (b. 1895)
- August 19 – Felicisimo Fajardo, Olympic basketball player (b. 1915)
- October 3 – Alfie Almario, basketball player (b. 1963)
- October 12 – Eddie Rodriguez, film director (b. 1932)
- November 7 – Nida Blanca, actress (b. 1936)
- November 8 – Valentin Eduque, basketball coach and player (b. 1927)
- November 23 – Maria Teresa Carlson, actress (b. 1963)
