= Flight 585 =

Flight 585 may refer to:

- United Airlines Flight 585, crashed approaching Colorado Springs in 1991 — rudder control failure
- Laoag International Airlines Flight 585, crashed into Manila Bay after take-off in 2002 — pilot error
- AIRES Columbia Flight 585
