= Philippine Truth Commission =

Philippines Truth Commission
- Formation: July 30, 2010; 16 years ago
- Founder: Benigno Aquino, III
- Type: Public Office
- Purpose: To find out the truth about reports of large scale graft and corruption in the previous government
- Members: 5
- Leader: Hilario Davide Jr.

The Philippine Truth Commission was created to find out the truth about reports of large scale graft and corruption in the previous government; to put a closure to them by the filing of the appropriate cases against those who were involved. Furthermore, to deter others from committing such crimes and to restore the people's faith and confidence in the government and in their public servants. On July 30, 2010, President Benigno Aquino III set up the Philippine Truth Commission to find out the truth about reports of large scale graft and corruption in the previous government and to put a closure to them by the filing of the appropriate cases against those who were involved. Furthermore, to prevent others from committing such crimes and to restore the people's faith and confidence in the government and in their public servants.

== History ==
Traced back to 2010, from a series of events within the elections, with the issue of massive corruption, in which Benigno Simeon Aquino III formed a special body tasked to investigate the alleged instances of graft and corruption of the Gloria Macapagal Arroyo administration, along with a few other incidents. The commission looked into how her administration rigged the 2004 presidential election, misusing government funds and profited from government contracts. On July 30, 2010, President Benigno Aquino III signed Executive Order No. 1 establishing the Philippine Truth Commission of 2010. It is an entity under the Office of the President that is formed to investigate graft and corruption reports and to submit recommendations based on the fact-finding procedures to the president. Two cases assailed the validity and constitutionality of Executive Order No. 1. The first case is a special civil action for prohibition instituted by petitioner Louis Biraogo. The second case is a special civil action for certiorari and prohibition filed by Lagman, Albano, Jr., Datumanong, and Fua.

=== Time line ===
- On June 29, 2010, Aquino announced his plans for the creation of the truth commission, which would be led by Chief Justice Hilario Davide Jr., allowing him to issue an executive order to make the commission official and clear up any ambiguity regarding the commission authority.
- July 26, 2010, Aquino signed the first executive order to formally create the Truth Commission within his State of Nation Address.
- July 30, 2010, the Philippines Truth Commission 2010 was created and President Aquino signed Executive Order No. 1, forming a special body tasked to investigate the instances of graft and corruption of the Arroyo administration. The creating of the Philippine Truth Commission of 2010 statements and sections can be viewed on this outside link:
- July 31, 2010, the House Minority Floor Leader Edcel Lagman of Lakas-Kampi challenged the Truth Commission, claiming that the commission lacked 'constitutional infirmities' as only Congress can create such bodies and allocate funds for it. The House minority challenged in court the legality of the Aquino administration's Truth Commission. Lagman claimed that Aquino did not have the funding authority which is reserved to the Congress, the appropriation language of Section 11 of Executive Order No.1. lacked particularity and transparency because no specific amount is appropriated.
- On August 7, 2010, the previous president, Joseph Estrada, criticized the appointment of Davide as head of Truth Commission, alleging inconsistent use of courts funds.
- On August 12, 2010, Lagman led three other lawmakers, Rodolfo Albano, Jr. of Isabela's 1st District, Simeon Datumanong of Maguindanao's 2nd District, and Orlando Fua of Siquijor's Lone District, in asking the Supreme Court to abolish the Executive Order No. 1. They are all allies of the former president, Arroyo. The representatives argued that Executive Order No. 1 is unconstitutional and that the commission duplicates the work of the Office of the Ombudsman and the Justice Department.
- September 13, 2010, members of the Truth Commission took their oath of office in Malacanang.
- September 14, 2010, the Supreme Court ask the Truth Commission not to start work, yet pending the resolution of petitions against the body.
- On October 15, 2010, the commission faced the media for the first time, taking complaints from the public.

== Description ==
=== Formation and mandate ===
The Philippine Truth Commission (PTC) was said to be a public office, a body under the Office of the President Proper. However, although it is vested with certain powers, such as the power to investigate, its authority is still very limited. The PTC was empowered to investigate reports of massive corrupt practices in the government (as mentioned within the history section) during the Arroyo administration, and to subsequently report and recommend necessary measures to the President, the Congress, and the Ombudsman. Overall, it is the fact-finding body on graft and corrupt case involving third level public officers and higher, their co-principals, accomplices and accessories from the private sector. It was established by virtue of the continuing power of the president to reorganize his office as provided by the Revised Administrative Code, and pursuant to the constitutional mandate of Article XI, Section I of the 1987 Constitution of the Philippines.

==== Members ====
The PTC was composed of a total of five members:

- The Chairman
- Four other members who will serve as an independent collegial body, this includes:
  - A General Counsel
  - A Deputy General Counsel
  - A Special Counsel
  - A Clerk of the Commission

==== Creation ====
The creation of the PTC finds justification under Section 17, Article VII of the Constitution which states that "The President shall have control of all the executive departments, bureaus, and offices. He shall ensure that the laws be faithfully executed." One of the recognized powers of the president granted pursuant to his duty is the power to create ad hoc committees. This allows inquiry into matters which the president is entitled to know. Furthermore, there is no appropriation of funds but only allocations of existing funds. The PTC, by focusing on punishing graft and corrupt practices committed by a past administration, deviates from the usual framework of truth commissions. The power of the president to create the PTC has been questioned, due to the section 31 within the RAC, Continuing Authority of the President to reorganize his office, therefore the establishment of the PTC is claimed to be a usurpation of the legislative power of congress. Hence, investigation which target “public accountability and transparency” inherent in the president's power. However, the court justifies the PTC creation under Article VII, Section 17 of the Constitution, which allows the president the obligation to investigation that target "public accountability and transparency" were inherent in the president's powers. Therefore, even if the creation of fact finding or ad hoc bodies is not expressly reposed to the president, it still does not deprive him of these powers. The court ruled that the investigating body will properly inform the president of the circumstances surrounding the issue, which will allow him to take the necessary measures to prevent future anomalous practices in the government.

=== Power to investigate ===
The power of the PTC to investigate, although authorized as a fact-finding body, does not have any quasi-judicial power, but the power to investigate. Thus, the PTC, instead of infringing upon duties of the Ombudsman and the Department of Justice in determining the existence of probable cause and of prosecuting cases, will actually complement them. However, the power of the Ombudsman to investigate is not exclusive to him; only under the R.A. No. 6670, which was not exclusive, yet was shared with other similarly organized agencies. All findings of the PTC are subject to be reviewed by the courts. This means that it can be shared with other similar bodies, such as the findings within the Davide and Feliciano Commissions.

==== Empowerment ====
The PTC has no power to file charges against the accused. In relation to the graft cases it shall choose to investigate, the Truth Commission is empowered to:

- Collect and receive evidence
- Require any agency, official or employee of the Executive Branch, including government-owned or controlled corporations, to produce documents, books, records and other papers
- Upon proper request, obtain information and documents from the Senate and the House of Representatives and records of investigations conducted by their committees
- Upon proper request, obtain from the courts, including the Sandiganbayan and the Office of the Court Administrator, information or documents in respect to corruption cases filed with the Sandiganbayan or the regular courts
- Invite or subpoena witnesses and take their testimonies, and for that purpose, administer oaths or affirmations
- Recommend that a person be admitted as a state witness
- Turn evidence over to the appropriate prosecutorial authorities for expeditious prosecution
- Call upon any government investigative or prosecutorial agency such as the Department of Justice or any of the agencies under it, and the Presidential Anti-Graft Commission, for assistance and cooperation
- Engage the services of resource persons, professionals and other personnel, when necessary
- Engage the services of experts as consultants or advisers, when necessary
- Promulgate rules and regulations and rules of procedure
- Exercise such other acts incident to or appropriate and necessary in connection with the commission's objectives.

=== Analyzing the PTC case ===
The activists pointed out, and the Court agreed, that there were also instances of graft and corruption reported earlier administration. Therefore, corruption alone does not establish a substantial distinction for the case. There are two main similarities between the Arroyo administration and all other past administration. First, it is "just a member of class, that is, a class of part administration" or administrations that came before the present Aquino administration, in which all represented the Executive Branch during their time.Second, "[t]he reports of widespread corruption in the Arroyo administration cannot be taken as basis for distinguishing said administration from earlier administration, which were also blemished by similar widespread reports of impropriety. To limit the scope of the PTC, specifically to this administration, does not constitute reasonable classification.

Any person called to testify before the Truth Commission has the right to counsel at any stage of the proceedings. To ensure the safety of persons called to testify, the Commission may secure the assistance of the Philippine National Police and other appropriate government agencies. If a government official or personnel

- (a) fails, without lawful excuse, to appear when subpoenaed by the commission;

and/or

- (b) appears before the commission but refuses to take oath or affirmation, give testimony or produce documents for inspection, when required, he shall be subject to disciplinary action. If a private person does the same, he may be dealt with in accordance with law.

The proceedings of the Truth Commission were opened to the public. However, the commission, on its own, or on the request of the person testifying, did hold an executive or closed-door hearing when matters of national security or public safety are involved or when the personal safety of the witness warrants it. The Truth Commission wanted to accomplish its mission and render a comprehensive final report on or before 31 December 2012. The PTC was a step towards national healing over a sordid past. The Court should allow the nation to move forward and the people's faith in a just and accountable government to be restored.

== See also ==
- Biraogo vs. Philippine Truth Commission
