= 2003 in the Philippines =

- Decades: 1980s; 1990s; 2000s; 2010s; 2020s
- See also: List of years in the Philippines; films

2003 in the Philippines details events of note that happened in the Philippines in the year 2003.

== Incumbents ==
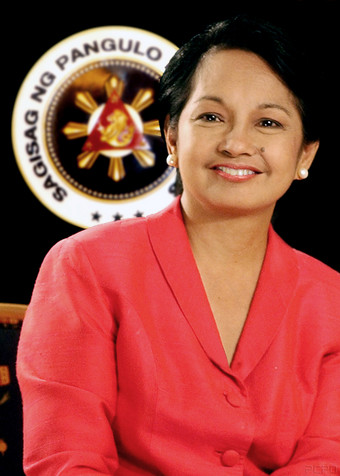
Gloria Macapagal
M. Arroyo

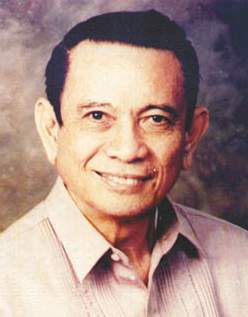
Teofisto T.
Guingona Jr.

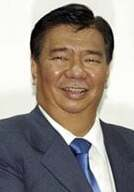
Franklin
M. Drilon

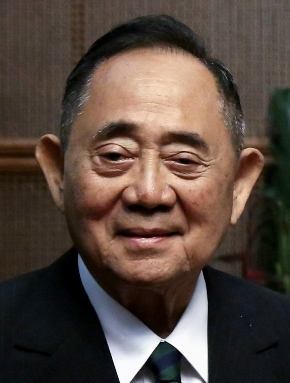
Jose C.
de Venecia Jr.

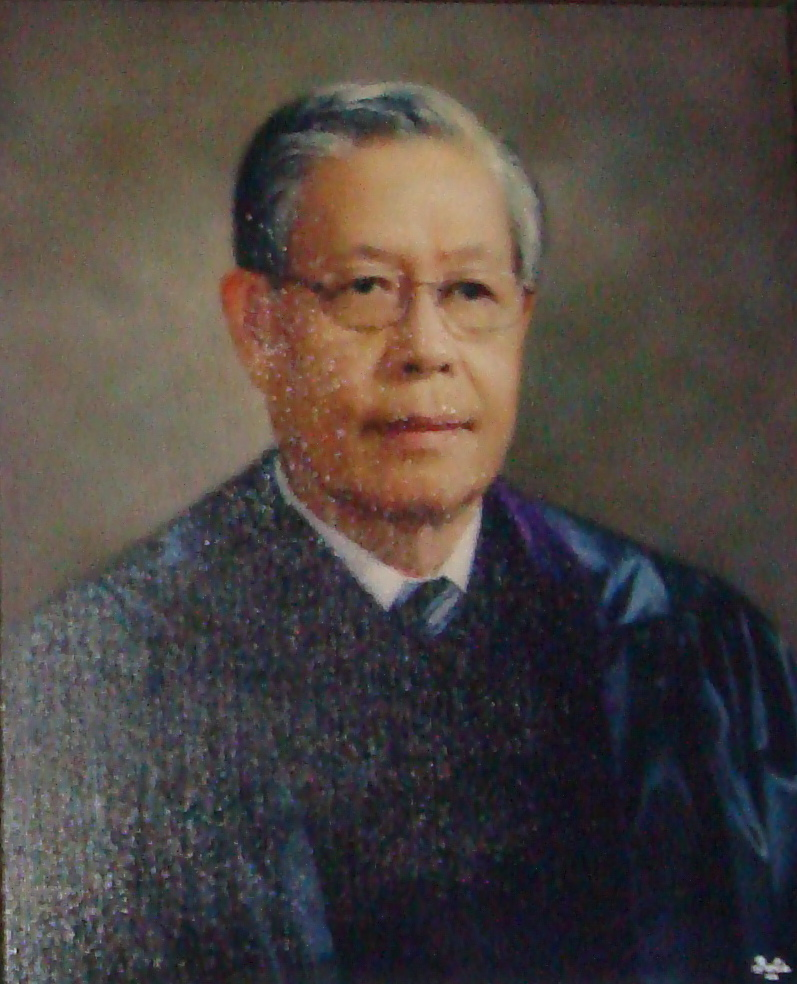
Hilario G.
Davide Jr.

- President – Gloria Macapagal Arroyo (Lakas-CMD)
- Vice President – Teofisto Guingona (Independent)
- Senate President – Franklin Drilon
- House Speaker – Jose de Venecia
- Chief Justice – Hilario Davide, Jr.
- Philippine Congress – 12th Congress of the Philippines

== Events ==
=== January ===
- January 22 – 26 – The 4th World Meeting of Families is held at the Quirino Grandstand, Luneta Park, Manila.

=== February ===
- February 13 – The Overseas Absentee Voting Act is passed into law providing a system of voting for overseas Filipinos.

=== March ===
- March 1 – As a result of the implementation of Electric Power Industry Reform Act (EPIRA) law or Republic Act 9136 one year and nine months earlier on June 8, 2001, The National Power Corporation (NAPOCOR/NPC) takes over the operations, maintenance, management, and ownership of the Philippine power grid and its related assets and facilities to another government-owned corporation National Transmission Corporation (TransCo).
- March 4 – A bomb explodes outside the terminal of Francisco Bangoy International Airport, killing 22 and injuring 143. Abu Sayyaf claims responsibility for the attack. Several alleged members of the ASG and the Moro Islamic Liberation Front would be arrested in April for their involvement.
- March 31 – An ambush in Vigan kills four people. Radio broadcaster and former Ilocos Norte board member Efren Rafanan Sr. survive the ambush, along with his daughter.

=== April ===
- April 2 – Another bomb explosion in Davao City hits the Sasa Wharf, killing 17 people and wounding 56. Several alleged Islamic militants would be later arrested for their involvement.

=== May ===
- May 10 – A bombing at the city market in Koronadal, South Cotabato, kills at least 10 people and injures 42; the victims are mostly tricycle drivers and their passengers. Suspected Indonesian Jemaah Islamiyah members are among those would be later arrested in connection with the attacks in the city.
- May 26 – The Anti-Trafficking in Persons Act of 2003 is passed into law. The Philippines becomes one of the first Asian nations to pass anti-trafficking legislation.

=== June ===
- June 23 – A new law is enacted regulating the sale and use of tobacco products, including the phaseout of all tobacco advertising in five years and a total ban on smoking in enclosed public places, including schools.

=== July ===
- July 15 – The Supreme Court, reinstating the Sandiganbayan ruling in 2000 and setting aside its reversal in 2002, orders the forfeiture in favor of the government of ₱36 billion (US$676 million, year-end 2002) in Swiss bank deposits which are declared part of the ill-gotten wealth of the Marcos family, in what would be the single largest recovery of such wealth. The family will file motions for reconsideration in August but would be denied with finality three months later.
- July 27 – A group of soldiers calling themselves the Bagong Katipuneros launch a mutiny in Oakwood against President Gloria Macapagal Arroyo, citing alleged corruption of Arroyo's administration and claiming that Arroyo was about to declare martial law.

== Holidays ==
On November 13, 2002, Republic Act No. 9177 declares Eidul Fitr as a regular holiday. The EDSA Revolution Anniversary was proclaimed since 2002 as a special non-working holiday. Note that in the list, holidays in bold are "regular holidays" and those in italics are "nationwide special days".

- January 1 – **New Year's Day**
- February 25 – EDSA Revolution Anniversary
- April 9 – **Araw ng Kagitingan (Bataan and Corregidor Day)**
- April 17 – **Maundy Thursday**
- April 18 – **Good Friday**
- May 1 – **Labor Day**
- June 12 – **Independence Day**
- August 31 – **National Heroes Day**
- November 1 – All Saints Day
- November 25 – **Eidul Fitr**
- November 30 – **Bonifacio Day**
- December 25 – **Christmas Day**
- December 30 – **Rizal Day**
- December 31 – Last Day of the Year

In addition, several other places observe local holidays, such as the foundation of their town. These are also "special days."

== Concerts ==
- September 13 – The Event with F4 and Barbie Hsu live at the PhilSports Complex, Pasig
- November 16 – Mariah Carey live at the Bonifacio Global City Open Field, Taguig
- December 26 – F4 live at the Bonifacio Global City Open Field, Taguig

== Sports ==
- July 13 – The Talk 'N Text Phone Pals win their first-ever PBA title in 13 years, winning four straight over the defending champions Coca Cola Tigers in a 4–2 series victory.
- August 23 – Alaska Aces win their PBA Invitational Championship title with a 2–1 series victory over the Coca-Cola Tigers.
- December 14 – After two runner-up finishes in the first two conferences, the Coca Cola Tigers win their 2nd PBA title with a 4–3 series victory over San Miguel Beermen.
- December 5 – 13 – The Philippines participates at the 22nd Southeast Asian Games in Hanoi, Vietnam.

== Births ==
- January 4 – Aleah Finnegan, gymnast
- February 5 – Michael Sager, actor and model
- February 14 – Zephanie Dimaranan, singer
- February 18 - Vange Alinsug, volleyball athlete
- March 2 – AZ Martinez, actress
- March 12 – Andrea Brillantes, actress and model
- March 29 – Sandro Reyes, football player
- June 1 – Jayda Avanzado, actress and singer
- June 18 – Skye Chua, actress and figure skater
- June 20 – Kyle Echarri, actor and singer
- June 25 – Angel Canino, volleyball player
- July 13 – Stacey, singer and member of Bini
- August 16 – Harvey Bautista, actor
- October 6 – Rob Deniel, singer
- October 12 – Kobie Brown, actor
- October 13 – Ar Angel Aviles, actress
- October 22 – Lie Reposposa, singer, actress, and competition show contestant
- November 8 – Mikha, singer and member of Bini
- November 22 – Reign Parani, actress
- November 23 – Allen Ansay, actor
- December 27 – Louise Abuel, actor and model

== Deaths ==
- March 23 – Amado Cortez, former actor and diplomat (b. 1928)
- March 31 – Eddie Arenas, actor (b. 1935)
- April 9 – Rod Navarro, former TV host, actor, and radio commentator (b. 1936)
- June 19 – Rafael Ileto, former Defense secretary (b. 1920)
- June 24 – Rene Cayetano, former Senator and father of Senator Pia and Alan Peter Cayetano (b. 1934)
- July 2 – Antonio Fortich, Catholic bishop and social activist (b. 1913)
- July 4 – Manuel Araneta, Jr., basketball player (b. 1926)
- July 6 – Jose C. Abriol, Catholic priest, monsignor, and Bible translator (b. 1918)
- July 18 – César Ramírez, former actor and father of Ace Vergel (b. 1929)
- July 19 – Vic Vargas, former actor (b. 1939)
- July 27 – Emmanuel Pelaez, former Vice-President of the Philippines (b. 1915)
- September 10 – Tata Esteban, 48, former film director (b. 1954)
- September 26 – Inday Badiday, host and journalist who was known as Philippine television's "queen of showbiz talk shows" and "queen of intrigues" (b. 1944)
- November 14 – Carding Castro, former singer-comedian and singing comic duo Reycard Duet (b. 1935)
- November 16 – Catalino Macaraig, Jr., politician (b. 1927)
- November 20 – Pedro Yap, former Chief Justice (b. 1918)
- December 14 – Blas Ople, former Senator and former Secretary of Department of Foreign Affairs (b. 1927)
- December 29 – Miko Sotto, former young actor and son of actress and radio host Ali Sotto (b. 1982)
