= Artemio Panganiban =

Filipino judge and 20th Chief Justice of the Philippine Supreme Court (born 1936)

The Honorable Artemio V. Panganiban
- Panganiban in 2026

21st Chief Justice of the Philippines
- In office December 20, 2005 – December 6, 2006
- Appointed by: Gloria Macapagal Arroyo
- Preceded by: Hilario G. Davide Jr.
- Succeeded by: Reynato S. Puno

137th Associate Justice of the Supreme Court of the Philippines
- In office October 5, 1995 – December 19, 2005
- Appointed by: Fidel Ramos
- Preceded by: Camilo D. Quiason
- Succeeded by: Presbitero J. Velasco Jr.

Personal details
- Born: Artemio Villaseñor Panganiban Jr. December 7, 1937 (age 88) Sampaloc, Manila, Commonwealth of the Philippines
- Spouse: Elenita Alcazar Carpio (m. 1961; died 2023)
- Education: Far Eastern University (L.L.B.)
- Website: https://cjpanganiban.com/

Artemio Villaseñor Panganiban Jr. (born December 6, 1936) is a Filipino jurist. He served as the 21st Chief Justice of the Supreme Court from 2005 to 2006.

== Early life and education ==
Panganiban was born on December 6, 1936, in Sampaloc, Manila in a poor family. His parents were ethnic Pampanga natives Artemio Panganiban Sr. and Patricia Villaseñor. He graduated with "Honorable Mention" from the Juan Luna Elementary School in 1950. He also finished with "Honorable Mention" from the Victorino Mapa High School in 1954.

Panganiban was granted a University of the Philippines scholarship, but could not enroll because his impoverished parents could not afford the then 15-centavo bus ride between Diliman and the family's small rented apartment in Cataluna Street, Sampaloc, Manila, which caused him to enroll as a scholar at the Far Eastern University (FEU). He took up a scholarship and earned a degree of Associate in Arts summa cum laude at the Far Eastern University in 1956. He also earned a degree of Bachelor of Laws, and graduated cum laude also at the Far Eastern University in 1960. Prior to his graduation, he was named as the 1959 "Most Outstanding Student" of Far Eastern University. Nonetheless he was bestowed in 1998 with a membership in the UP Chapter of the Phi Kappa Phi honor society.

=== Bar topnotcher ===
In the 1960 Philippine Bar Examination, he was under the weather and hospitalized at FEU Hospital before taking the bar exam at the University of the East (UE). The dean Jovito R. Salonga convinced him to not quit and he finished the four week-bar exams, and even placed sixth, with a rating of 89.55%. In 1997, he was given an honorary doctorate degree in law by the University of Iloilo. He was a founder and former president of the National Union of Students of the Philippines from 1958 to 1959 and legal consultant to the Education Secretary and to the National Board of Education from 1963 to 1965. Panganiban was also conferred a Doctor of Laws (Honoris Causa) degree by the Far Eastern University in 2002, by the University of Cebu in 2006, by Angeles University, in 2006, and by the Bulacan State University, in 2006.

== Professional career ==
Panganiban started as an associate lawyer and apprentice of Jovito Salonga at the Salonga, Ordoñez and Associates Law Office from 1961 to 1963. According to Panganiban, his biggest heroes were Jose W. Diokno, the father of human rights, Salonga his mentor, and future Chief Justice Claudio Teehankee; Panganiban could not find sufficient funds to continue his scholarship offer in Yale, so Salonga, a Yale alumnus, brought him under his wing to teach him all he learned from Yale and all he knew of the law. In 1963, the young Panganiban formed his own law firm PABLAW (Panganiban, Benitez, Parlade, Africa and Barinaga Law Offices), which he headed until he joined the Supreme Court in 1995. He also became the vice president of the Legal Management Council of the Philippines from 1976 to 1977. He was the Vice President for Legal Affairs and General Counsel, Philippine Chamber of Commerce and Industry (PCCI), 1991–1995. He was Chief Legal Counsel of the Parish Pastoral Council for Responsible Voting (PPCRV), 1991–1995, and the only Filipino appointed by Pope John Paul II to the Pontifical Council for the Laity. He was Legal Counsel of the Manila Archdiocesan and Parochial Schools Association (MAPSA) from May 7, 1993, to October 9, 1995. He was chair of Workshop on Administration of Justice, Multi-Sectoral Conference convened to discuss the first 100-day and first 1,000-day programs of President Fidel Ramos, held on June 13, 1992, and on October 17, 1992, respectively.

He taught law and political science at the Far Eastern University, Assumption Convent, and San Sebastian College from 1961 to 1970. He became a bank director of the International Corporate Bank (which is now owned by the Union Bank of the Philippines) from 1972 to 1974.

From 1978 to 1981, he was a consultant of the World Tourism Organization and was an honorary consul of the Republic of Honduras from 1981 to 1983. He was the president of Arpan Tourism Industries Corp. from 1974 to 1993 and Baron Travel Corporation from 1967 to 1993.

Panganiban was the chief legal counsel of the Liberal Party from 1987 to 1991 and was president of the Philippine Daily Inquirer from 1991 to 1992.

He was also the governor of the Management Association of the Philippines and president of the Rotary Club of Manila. He was also the former president of Philippine-Finland Association and RCM Eyebank Foundation Inc.

Panganiban also writes columns for the Philippine Daily Inquirer and has worked as a consultant and director of various businesses and organizations.

=== Supreme Court ===
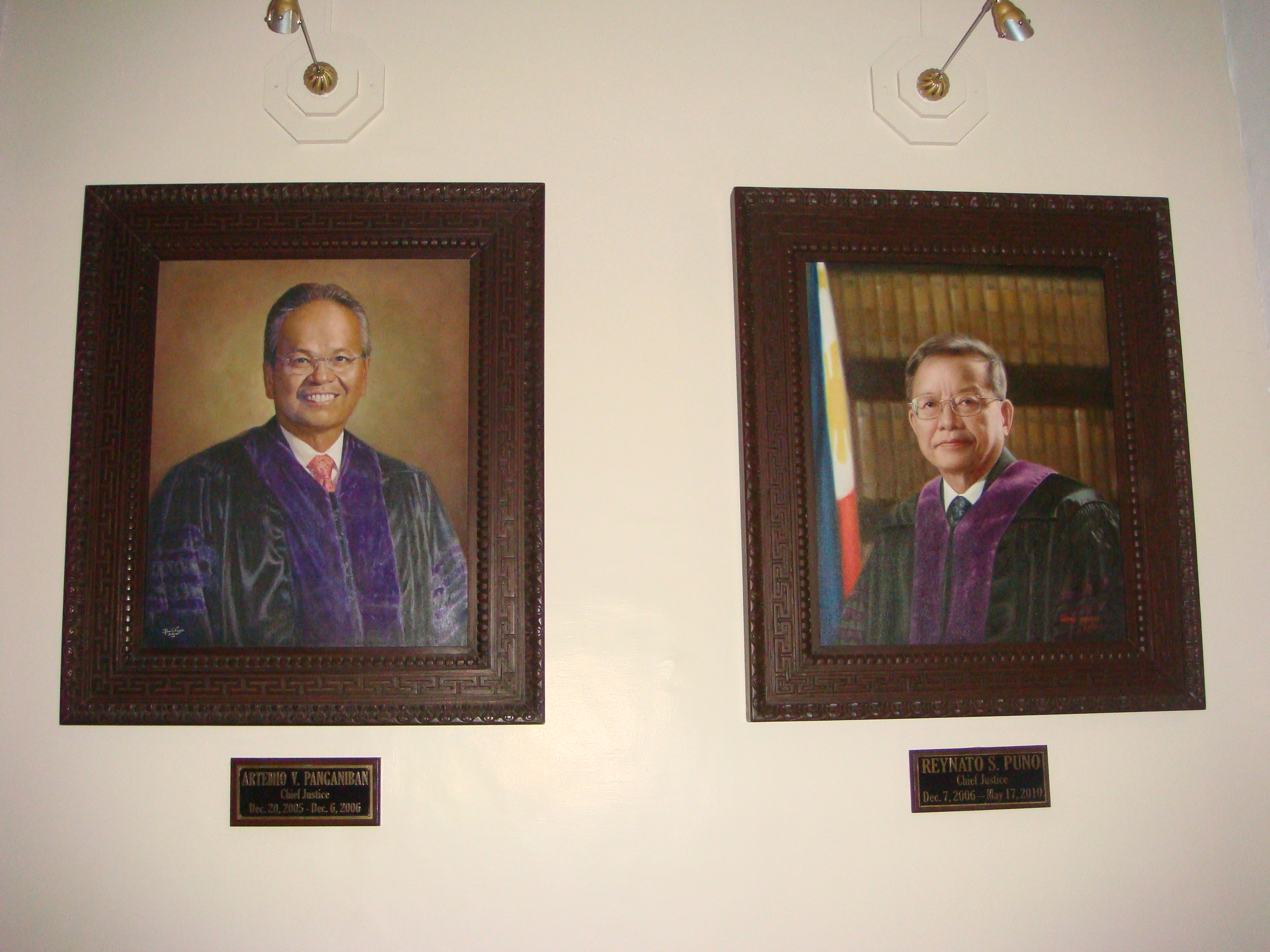
Official portraits of CJ Artemio Panganiban and Reynato S. Puno in the new SC building.

Panganiban was named as Associate Justice of the Supreme Court in 1995. Panganiban was the chairperson of the Supreme Court Third Division and the House of Representatives Electoral Tribunal (HRET), as well as of seven SC committees involved mainly in judicial reforms. Described by Justice Antonio Carpio as “undoubtedly the most prolific writer of the Court” he penned more than 1,000 full-length decisions and ten books plus several thousand minute resolutions disposing of controversies. These include the Cocofed case, in which the court gave the Presidential Commission on Good Government the right to vote sequestered United Coconut Planters Bank shares, which had been acquired through coco levy funds.

==== 2001 EDSA revolution ====
Panganiban was also known for his controversial role in helping install then Vice President Gloria Macapagal Arroyo as president in 2001 after the downfall of Joseph Estrada.

In his book Reforming the Judiciary, Panganiban recounted that on the morning of January 20, 2001, militants had threatened to march toward Don Chino Roces (Mendiola) Bridge, where Estrada supporters were encamped, unless he resigned. Chaos could have ensued, especially because the government machinery had fallen down, Panganiban said in his book.

He also worried that the Vice President could not act because Estrada was still the legal leader. On the other hand, a coup d'état might be staged, and that could obliterate the Constitution. These led Panganiban to conclude that "the only way to avert violence, chaos and bloodshed and to save our democratic system from collapse was to have Mrs. Arroyo sworn in as Acting President."

He added: "After prayer and reflection, I summoned the courage to call up Chief Justice Hilario Davide Jr. about 5:30 a.m. to explain to him my apprehensions. I proposed that, to save the Constitution, he should swear in GMA (Arroyo) by 12 noon of that day." Arroyo became president that day.

When the question of Arroyo's legitimacy arose, Davide and Panganiban recused themselves from the Supreme Court proceedings. On March 2, 2001, the court voted 13–0 to uphold Arroyo's ascension to the top post. A month later, the court again voted 13–0 to deny with finality Estrada's motion for reconsideration.

=== Chief Justice ===
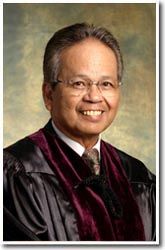
Official portrait as Chief Justice

Panganiban was named Supreme Court Chief Justice on December 20, 2005, by President Gloria Macapagal Arroyo after Hilario Davide Jr. retired at age 70. Panganiban was succeeded by Reynato Puno after one year in office in December 2006.

As Chief Justice, Panganiban drew controversy for his remarks made in June 2006 regarding the 1998 decision of the Supreme Court, in which he participated, affirming the death penalty imposed on Leo Echegaray. Echegaray, a convicted rapist was executed in 1999 in what was the first execution in the Philippines since the regime of Ferdinand Marcos. Panganiban, whose anti-death penalty views are well known, suggested that the Supreme Court may have committed "a judicial error" in executing Echegaray, as not all of the qualifying circumstances needed to promulgate a death conviction were actually established. Death-penalty advocates criticized Panganiban's remarks, which he gave after Congress passed a law abolishing the death penalty. Senator Edgardo Angara and anti-death penalty advocate Senator Aquilino Pimentel Jr. suggested that the government indemnify the family of Echegaray. Panganiban subsequently clarified that his remarks on the Echegaray decision were his own personal views and not that of the Supreme Court.

=== Books ===
As his way of reporting on his magistracy, Justice Panganiban writes one book a year. He has authored the following:

- 1994 – Love God, Serve Man
- 1997 – Justice and Faith
- 1998 – Battles in the Supreme Court
- 1999 – Leadership by Example
- 2000 – Transparency, Unanimity & Diversity
- 2001 – A Centenary of Justice
- 2002 – Reforming the Judiciary
- 2003 – The Bio Age Dawns on the Judiciary
- 2004 – Leveling the Playing Field
- 2005 – Judicial Renaissance
- 2006 – Liberty and Prosperity (two volumes)

== Post-Judiciary ==
=== With Due Respect ===
On February 12, 2007, Panganiban began writing "With Due Respect" in the Opinion section of the Philippine Daily Inquirer. Panganiban continues to discuss on the state of Philippine politics and the acts of the government in terms of justice and fairness.

== Personal life ==
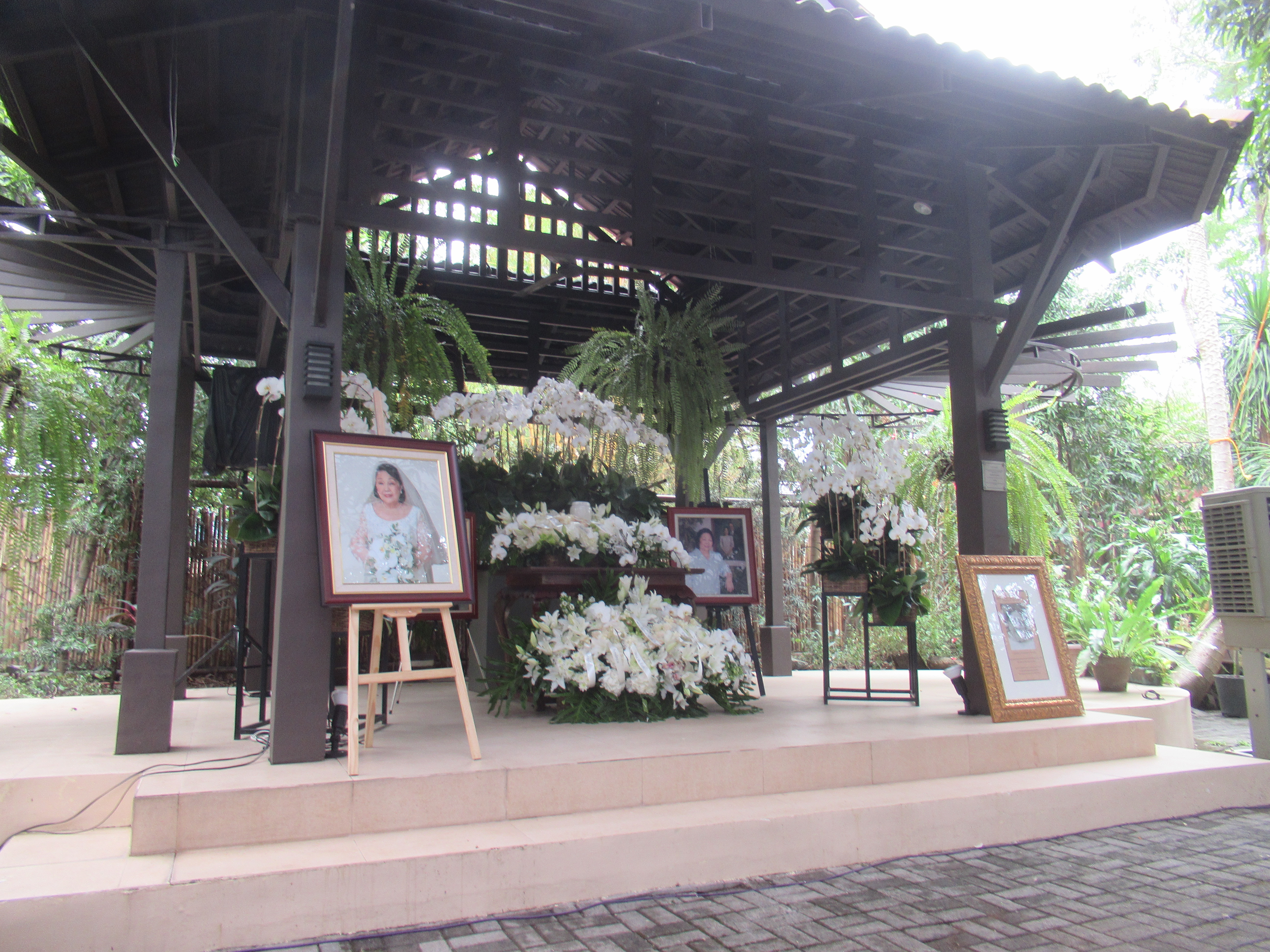
Wake of Elenita Carpio-Panganiban at the Santuario de San Antonio, Forbes Park, Makati on 14 April 2023

Panganiban was married to Elenita Alcazar Carpio, a former associate dean and professor of the Asian Institute of Management. Panganiban and Carpio were wed at the Immaculate Conception Church in Rosario Heights, Quezon City, on April 8, 1961. They had five children. Carpio died on April 10, 2023, due to complications from hypoglycemia. Panganiban also has 10 grandchildren.

Panganiban is also an independent director at GMA Network, Manila Electric Company, Robinsons Land Corp., Metro Pacific Tollways Corp., Petron Corporation, Bank of the Philippine Islands, Asian Terminals, and Jollibee Foods Corporation.

== Awards ==
- On April 16, 2007, the Philippine Bar Association, on its 116th Foundation Day Celebration, conferred upon Panganiban the "Award of Honor", citing him as
  ...a principled and visionary leader by example; a prolific writer of the Supreme Court, bar none; a renaissance man and a nobly-souled and gifted jurist; a much sought-after speaker; a recipient of over 250 awards and citations from national and international entities and organizations, including several honorary doctoral degrees; an eminent lawyer, law professor, Catholic lay worker, civic leader and businessman; a scholar imbued with mental dexterity; and, an exemplary family man.
- On April 9, 2024, Day of Valor, the Bantayog ng mga Bayani foundation awarded 13 honorees led by Panganiban and Rene Saguisag with the "Haligi ng Bantayog" title at the University of the Philippines Hotel.
- In July 2024, Panganiban received the Pro Ecclesia et Pontifice award for his conservation activities, as the president of the Manila Metropolitan Cathedral-Basilica Foundation.

Legal offices
| Preceded by Hilario Davide Jr. | Chief Justice of the Supreme Court of the Philippines; 2005–2007 | Succeeded by Reynato Puno |
| Preceded by Camilo D. Quiason | Supreme Court; 1995–2005 | Succeeded by Presbitero J. Velasco Jr. |
