= Eduardo Decena =

Filipino basketball player

Eduardo P. Decena (January 14, 1926 in Manila – November 1, 2002 in Manila) was a Filipino basketball player who competed in the 1948 Summer Olympics.
