= Paco Gorospe =

- Born: Francisco "Paco" Gorospe Sy; July 10, 1939; Binondo, Manila, Commonwealth of the Philippines
- Died: September 22, 2002 (aged 63)
- Occupation: Painter

Francisco "Paco" Gorospe Sy (July 10, 1939 – September 22, 2002) was a Filipino painter, called the "Picasso of the Philippines".

Paco Gorospe is one of the famous painters of the Philippines. He was born in Binondo, Manila. He was inspired by the simple and colourful lifestyle of native tribes from the south of the country such as the Yakans, the Bogobos and the Tausugs.

He joined a local group of artists in Ermita, Manila, and sold his paintings locally, gradually gaining recognition. Paco started with crayons, later using water colours but finally shifted to oil paintings. His paintings caught the eye of Lydia Arguilla, founder of the Philippine Art Gallery (PAG), who displayed his work at PAG and included over 40 of his paintings in her personal collection.

Gorospe's first major exhibition, due largely to Lydia Arguilla's patronage, took place in 1962 at the World's Fair in Seattle, Washington. Following his stint at the "Century 21" World's Fair in Seattle, US sales increased, and in 1964 his works were chosen to represent the Philippines at the World's Fair in New York.

Other foreign exhibitions followed including Okinawa, Japan (1972), Baden-Baden, Germany (1989), Switzerland and Denmark.

In 1990, his work Sabungeros ("cockfighting") was chosen by Philippine Airlines for the cover of their playing cards given to passengers.
