= Camille Sahirul =

Filipino footballer (born 2001)

Personal information
- Full name: Gianna Camille Tanoy Sahirul
- Date of birth: January 23, 2001 (age 25)
- Place of birth: United States
- Height: 5 ft 6 in (1.68 m)
- Positions: Forward; midfielder

Team information
- Current team: Eastern Suburbs
- Number: 13

Youth career
- Ginga FC
- North Haven Nighthawks

College career
Years	Team	Apps	(Gls)
2019–2020	Franklin Pierce Ravens	16	(0)
2021–2024	FIU Panthers	53	(3)

Senior career*
Years	Team	Apps	(Gls)
2025–	Eastern Suburbs	15	(5)

International career^{‡}
2024–	Philippines	4	(0)
- * Club domestic league appearances and goals as of August 17, 2025 ‡ National team caps and goals as of April 8, 2025

Gianna Camille Tanoy Sahirul (born January 23, 2001) is a professional footballer who plays as a forward or midfielder for Eastern Suburbs in Australia's NPL Queensland. Born in the United States, she represents the Philippines at international level.

== Early life ==
Sahirul grew up in North Haven, Connecticut, and attended North Haven High School, where she was a four-year letterwinner in soccer, track and field, and rifle. In soccer, she earned All-League and All-Division honors as a senior and was a four-time All-Academic Team selection. In track and field, she was named team MVP, earned All-State honors in the triple jump, and was selected to the New Haven Register All-Area Team. She also captained the rifle and track teams and was a three-time All-State honoree in rifle. She played club soccer for Ginga FC and was a member of the National Honor Society and Spanish Honor Society.

== College career ==
Sahirul began her collegiate career at Franklin Pierce University in 2019, appearing in all 16 matches with 15 starts. She registered two assists and was named to the Northeast-10 Conference All-Rookie Team and the Academic Honor Roll.

She transferred to Florida International University in 2021. In her first season, she started all 16 matches and led the team in minutes played, helping the defense secure multiple shutouts. She missed the 2022 season due to injury. In 2023, she returned to start all 18 matches, scoring three goals and providing three assists. She earned All-Conference USA Second Team honors and was named to the CUSA All-Academic Team.

In her final season in 2024, Sahirul started 19 of 20 matches and recorded six assists, ranking fourth in Conference USA. She helped FIU win both the Conference USA Regular Season and Tournament Championships. She was named to the CUSA All-Academic Team for the third time and was selected to the College Sports Communicators (CSC) Academic All-District Team.

== Club career ==
In 2025, Sahirul signed with Eastern Suburbs FC in the National Premier Leagues Queensland. She scored her first goal for the club in a 3–3 draw against FQ Academy QAS on May 17, 2025.

== International career ==
Sahirul was called up to the Philippines women's national football team for the first time on February 15, 2024, ahead of the 2024 Pinatar Cup in Spain. She made her international debut as a starter in a friendly match against Finland on February 21, 2024.

== Career statistics ==
=== International ===
As of match played April 8, 2025

Appearances and goals by national team and year
National team	Year	Apps	Goals
Philippines	2024	3	0
Philippines	2025	1	0
Total		4	0
