= Laoag International Airlines =

Filipino airline

IATA	ICAO	Call sign
L7	LPN	LAOAG AIR
- Founded: 1995
- Ceased operations: November 2002
- Hubs: Laoag International Airport
- Fleet size: 4 to 5 before officially ceasing operations
- Headquarters: Laoag, Philippines

Laoag International Airlines was an airline based in the Philippines. It shut down when one of its aircraft, Flight 585 crashed in Manila Bay in 2002.

== Code data ==
Laoag International Airlines Code Data.

- IATA Code: L7
- ICAO Code: LPN
- Callsign: LAOAG AIR

== Destinations ==
- Laoag, Ilocos Norte
- Manila
- Basco, Batanes
- Cebu City, Cebu
- Tacloban, Leyte
- Tuguegarao, Cagayan

== Accidents and incidents ==
On November 11, 2002, Laoag International Airlines Flight 585 was a Fokker F-27 Friendship crashed into Manila Bay shortly after takeoff from Ninoy Aquino International Airport. Of the 34 passengers and crew on board, 15 survived.
