= Edgardo Fulgencio =

Filipino basketball player

Edgardo V. Fulgencio (October 29, 1917 in Manila – October 28, 2004 in Union City, New Jersey) was a Filipino former basketball player who competed in the 1948 Summer Olympics.

Ding, as he was called by his friends before he was teased 'kalembang', started his basketball career in 1933 at the age of 16. Fulgencio transferred to Jose Rizal College and made the team in 1937. Then came the last war and at the age of 24, Ding was recruited by Skip Guinto, son of then Mayor Leon Guinto to join the Manila Flatties team along with Bobby Jones, Totong Martinez, Franco Marquicias, Felicisimo Fajardo and Guinto himself. It was a strong team that ruled all tournaments in Manila during the Japanese Occupation.

In 1946, Fulgencio joined the famed Maurice Enterprise squad and his team won their first MICAA championship by defeating the star-studded Sampaguita Pictures quintet. Ding rejoined the Heavy Bombers in 1947 in his ambition to get a degree. By 1948, JRC coach Mateo Adao has moulded a fighting team that captured the NCAA title after a 15-year campaign. The championship was the stepping stone for Ding to make the 1948 London Olympics.

Came 1949, Fulgencio was not qualified anymore to play in the NCAA and he went to Far Eastern University but had to undergo the one-year residence, so in the meantime, he played for Heacock's in the MICAA under his tutor, Franco Marquicias. Fulgencio helped power the FEU Tamaraws to the 1950 UAAP championship. The Tams won the opener and in the second game, FEU coach Martin Dino fielded Fulgencio, who was also a playmaker, as a forward. When Ding got his commerce degree in 1952, he announced his retirement and transferred from the court to the bench and mentored the Tamaraws to second place in the UAAP that year.
