= Maningning Miclat =

Filipina writer and artist (1972–2000)

- Born: 1972; Beijing, China
- Died: September 29, 2000 (aged 28); Sampaloc, Manila, Philippines
- Education: University of the Philippines Diliman
- Occupations: Poet and painter
- Relatives: Mario Miclat (father); Alma Cruz (mother); Banaue Miclat Janssen (sister)

Maningning Cruz Miclat was born on April 15, 1972 and died on September 29, 2000. She was a Filipina poet and painter that born in China of a Filipino parents. She was known for her Chinese bamboo Zen paintings as well as her poetry.

== Biography ==
Miclat was born in Beijing, China on April 15, 1972 to Filipino parents Mario Ignacio Miclat (September 12, 1949 - April 3, 2021) and Alma Cruz Miclat (December 15, 1950) who were based in China. As a result of her being born in China, she became fluent in three languages, namely Mandarin Chinese, Filipino, and English. She has a younger sister, Banaue Miclat (born July 21, 1979).

In 1987, she published her first book of poems, Wo De Shi (lit. 'My Poems'), in Mandarin Chinese, and held her first solo show of traditional Chinese painting, Maningning: An Exhibit of Chinese Brush Works. She had four more solo shows in her lifetime.

Miclat became a Fellow of the University of the Philippines National Writers Workshop in 1990 and won an award for a Filipino play. She also became a Fellow of the Silliman National Writers Workshop.

In year 1992, she won the Art Association of the Philippines Grand Prize for the painting titled, Trouble in Paradise, and her second book of poetry, Voice from the Underworld, was a finalist in the country's 2001 National Book Award.

Miclat attended the University of the Philippines Diliman to pursue a master's degree in fine arts and then taught at the Far Eastern University.

Excerpt from Why The Mural?

Beside this poem
is a prayer
frozen in the acrylic paints.

Beside this poem
is a mural
- a desire for space.

Maningning Miclat Poems

== Death and legacy ==
On September 29, 2000, at the young age of 28, Miclat committed suicide by jumping from the seventh floor of the Education Hall Building of Far Eastern University in Manila, where she was teaching. The Maningning Foundation was founded on April 15, 2001 in her memory to celebrate the talents of young artists both in the visual and written arts.

== Poetry and publications ==
- Maningning Miclat Poems
- Wo De Shi (My Poems)
- Voice from the Underworld (2000) ISBN 978-971-27-0934-0
