= Laoag International Airlines Flight 585 =

2002 aviation accident

Coordinates: 14°35′45″N 120°58′38″E

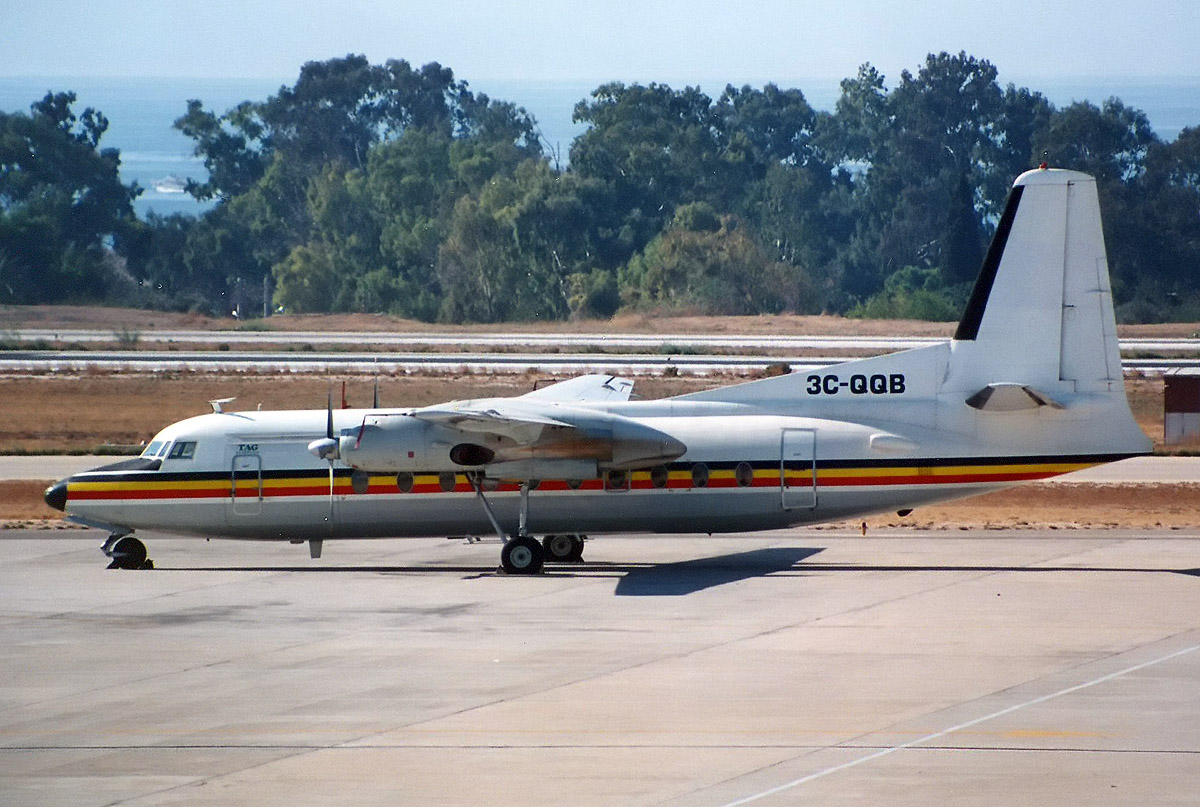
- The aircraft involved in the accident, seen in 2000 while still in service with a previous operator.

Accident
- Date: November 11, 2002
- Summary: Crashed into sea after engine failure
- Site: Manila Bay, near Ninoy Aquino International Airport, Manila, Philippines

Aircraft
- Aircraft type: Fokker F-27 Friendship
- Operator: Laoag International Airlines
- Registration: RP-C6888
- Flight origin: Ninoy Aquino International Airport
- Stopover: Laoag International Airport
- Destination: Basco Airport
- Occupants: 34
- Passengers: 29
- Crew: 5
- Fatalities: 19
- Injuries: 15
- Survivors: 15

Laoag International Airlines Flight 585 was a scheduled flight operated by Laoag International Airlines from Manila to Basco, Philippines via Laoag. On November 11, 2002, the Fokker F-27 Friendship crashed into Manila Bay shortly after takeoff from Ninoy Aquino International Airport. Of the 34 passengers and crew on board, 15 survived.

== Flight ==
Flight 585 took off from Runway 31 of Ninoy Aquino International Airport shortly after 6 a.m. local time for the first leg to Laoag.

Almost at once, the plane's engines began to fail. The flight crew decided to return to the airport but when it became an unfeasible option, the pilots chose to attempt a water landing in Manila Bay instead. The Fokker F-27 broke up and sank; the Philippine Coast Guard and local fishermen rushed to the scene but 19 passengers and crew had died.

The pilot and co-pilot of Flight 585 plus Roman Catholic Bishop Jose Paala Salazar were among the survivors.

== Aftermath ==
The aircraft sank in about 15–18 metres (50–60 ft) of water. A floating crane was initially used to attempt to raise the aircraft but was initially unsuccessful. Two days after the crash, the fuselage of the aircraft was finally raised from the depths of Manila Bay.

== Investigation ==
The owner of Laoag International Airlines, Paul Ng, stated sabotage caused the crash, but retracted his statement very soon afterwards. A month after the crash, Ng plus the airline's chief mechanic, were arrested by Philippine immigration authorities and charged with working without having a proper permit.

It was also found that Laoag International Airlines was not authorized to carry out scheduled services. Flight 585 was a scheduled service, and according to a source reported in the Manila Standard, the Manila–Basco service was a scheduled one.

In the days after the crash, it was also found that the Captain of the flight may have submitted counterfeit documents regarding his training. In September 1999, it was claimed that he submitted documents to the Air Transportation Office claiming he had finished a King Air B200 Recurrent training course at FlightSafety International in Long Beach, California. However, according to sources, ATO officials questioned Shannon Fackner, the records coordinator for FlightSafety International regarding the Captain's training. Fackner replied that the captain did not attend this training.

On January 10, 2003, it was announced that pilot error was the cause of the crash. The plane's two surviving pilots, Captain Bernie Crisostomo and First Officer Joseph Gardiner, failed to notice that the fuel valves were closed. Transportation and Communications Secretary Leandro Mendoza placed the blame for the pilot's fatal lapse on the principal officers of Laoag International Airlines.

Five months after the investigation was complete, a special committee of the Senate began proceedings to revoke Laoag International Airlines' congressional franchise.
