= Biraogo v. Philippine Truth Commission =

- Court: Supreme Court of the Philippines en banc

Full case name
- Louis Biraogo v. The Philippine Truth Commission of 2010 Rep. Edcel C. Lagman, Rep. Rodolfo B. Albano, Jr., Rep. Simeon A. Datumanong, and Rep. Orlando B. Fua, Sr. v. Executive Secretary Paquito N. Ochoa, Jr. and Department of Budget and Management Secretary Florencio B. Abad
- Decided: December 7, 2010
- G.R. numbers: 192935 and 193036
- Citation: 651 Phil. 374
- Ponente: Jose Catral Mendoza, joined by Mariano del Castillo, Presbitero Velasco and Martin Villarama
- Separate opinion: Jose Portugal Perez
- Separate opinion: Lucas Bersamin
- Separate opinion: Arturo Brion
- Separate opinion: Renato Corona
- Concurrence: Diosdado Peralta
- Concurrence: Teresita Leonardo-de Castro
- Concur/dissent: Antonio Nachura
- Dissent: Antonio Carpio
- Dissent: Conchita Carpio-Morales
- Dissent: Roberto Abad
- Dissent: Maria Lourdes Sereno

Biraogo v. Philippine Truth Commission (G.R. No. 192935) and Lagman, et al. v. Ochoa and Abad (G.R. No. 193036) are the two names of a ruling handed down by the Supreme Court of the Philippines which invalidated the creation of a truth commission tasked to investigate a previous president. The ruling, which was handed down on December 7, 2010, ruled on the two cases as consolidated petitions.

== Creation of the Truth Commission ==
After a month in office, President Benigno Aquino III issued Executive Order No. 1 (E.O. 1) on July 30, 2010, creating the Philippine Truth Commission (PTC). The PTC was tasked to conduct a thorough fact-finding investigation of reported cases of graft and corruption involving third level public officers during the administration of Aquino's predecessor Gloria Macapagal Arroyo, and thereafter submit its findings and recommendations to the Office of the President, Congress, and the Ombudsman.

Private citizen Louis Biraogo and a group of congressmen led by Lakas Kampi CMD chairman Rep. Edcel Lagman filed in the Supreme Court separate petitions for certiorari and prohibition assailing the constitutionality of E.O. 1 based on their belief that the creation of the PTC constitutes usurpation of the legislative power to create public office, threatens the independence of the Office of the Ombudsman, and violates the equal protection clause of the Philippine Constitution for specifically targeting certain officials of the Arroyo administration.

The main issues raised before the High Court were: (1) Whether the president can create public office such as the PTC without usurping the powers of Congress; (2) Whether the PTC supplants the powers already vested on the Ombudsman and the Department of Justice (DOJ); and, (3) Whether the purpose of the PTC transgresses the constitutional guarantee of equal protection of the laws.

== The Court's ruling ==
=== The president has the authority to create the Truth Commission ===
Majority of the members of the Supreme Court rejected the justification of the Solicitor General (OSG) that the creation of the PTC finds basis on the president's power of control over all executive offices. The decision stressed that "control" is essentially the power to alter, modify, nullify or set aside what a subordinate officer had done in the performance of his duties and to substitute the judgment of the former with that of the latter. Clearly, the power of control is entirely different from the power to create public offices. The majority also rejected the OSG's claim that the E.O. finds basis under sec. 31 of the Administrative Code, which authorizes the president to restructure the Office of the President. Clearly, "restructure" under the said provision refers to reduction of personnel, consolidation or abolition of offices by reason of economy or redundancy. This presupposes an already existing office. The creation of an office is nowhere mentioned, much less envisioned in said provision.

Nonetheless, the ponencia agreed with the argument of the OSG that the president's power to create the PTC may find justification under the president's duty under sec. 17, Article VII of the Constitution "to ensure that the laws be faithfully executed." The Court held that while it is true that the authority of the president to conduct investigations and to create bodies to execute this power is not explicitly mentioned in the Constitution or in statutes, it does not necessarily mean that he does not have such authority. The president has the obligation to ensure that all executive officials and employees (whether from past or present administrations) faithfully comply with the law. The purpose of ad hoc investigating bodies such as the PTC is to allow an inquiry into matters which the president is entitled to know so that he can be properly advised and guided in the performance of his duties relative to the execution and enforcement of the laws of the land.

=== The PTC will not erode the powers or independence of the Ombudsman ===
The Court also held that the investigative function of the commission will not supplant nor threaten the independence of the Office of the Ombudsman. If at all, it will complement the functions of the Ombudsman and the Department of Justice. As correctly pointed out by the OSG, the function of the PTC is merely to recommend prosecution, which is just a consequence of its fact-finding investigation. The actual prosecution of suspected offenders, much less adjudication on the merits of the charges against them, is certainly not a function given to the PTC.

=== The purpose of the PTC offends the equal protection clause ===
While the Court was almost unanimous in holding that the president indeed had the authority to create the PTC and that it would not unduly duplicate the powers of the Ombudsman, nine (9) of the justices joined Associate Justice Jose Catral Mendoza in refusing to uphold the constitutionality of E.O. 1 in view of its apparent transgression of the equal protection clause enshrined in sec. 1, Art. III of the Constitution. Senior Associate Justice Antonio Carpio was joined by four (4) others in their strong dissent.

Laying down a long line of precedents, the ponencia reiterated that equal protection simply requires that all persons or things similarly situated should be treated alike, both as to rights conferred and responsibilities imposed. The purpose of the equal protection clause is to secure every person against intentional and arbitrary discrimination. Applying this precept, the majority held that E.O. 1 should be struck down as violative of the equal protection clause.

The Decision stressed that the clear mandate of the PTC is to investigate and find out the truth "concerning the reported cases of graft and corruption during the previous administration" only. The intent to single out the previous administration is plain, patent and manifest. Mention of it has been made in at least three portions of the questioned executive order. The Arroyo administration, according to the ponencia, is just a member of a class, that is, a class of past administrations. It is not a class of its own. Not to include past administrations similarly situated constitutes arbitrariness which the equal protection clause cannot sanction. Such discriminating differentiation gave the majority an impression that the PTC is just being used "as a vehicle for vindictiveness and selective retribution" and that E.O. 1 is only an "adventure in partisan hostility."

While the Court recognized that the creation of the PTC was inspired with noble intentions, the ponencia nonetheless reminded the government of the ethical principle that "the end does not justify the means." It emphatically closed by stressing that the search for the truth must be within constitutional bounds, for "ours is still a government of laws and not of men."
