= Hilario Davide Jr. =

Filipino lawyer, judge, diplomat and politician (born 1935)

Hilario Davide Jr. GCSS KGCR
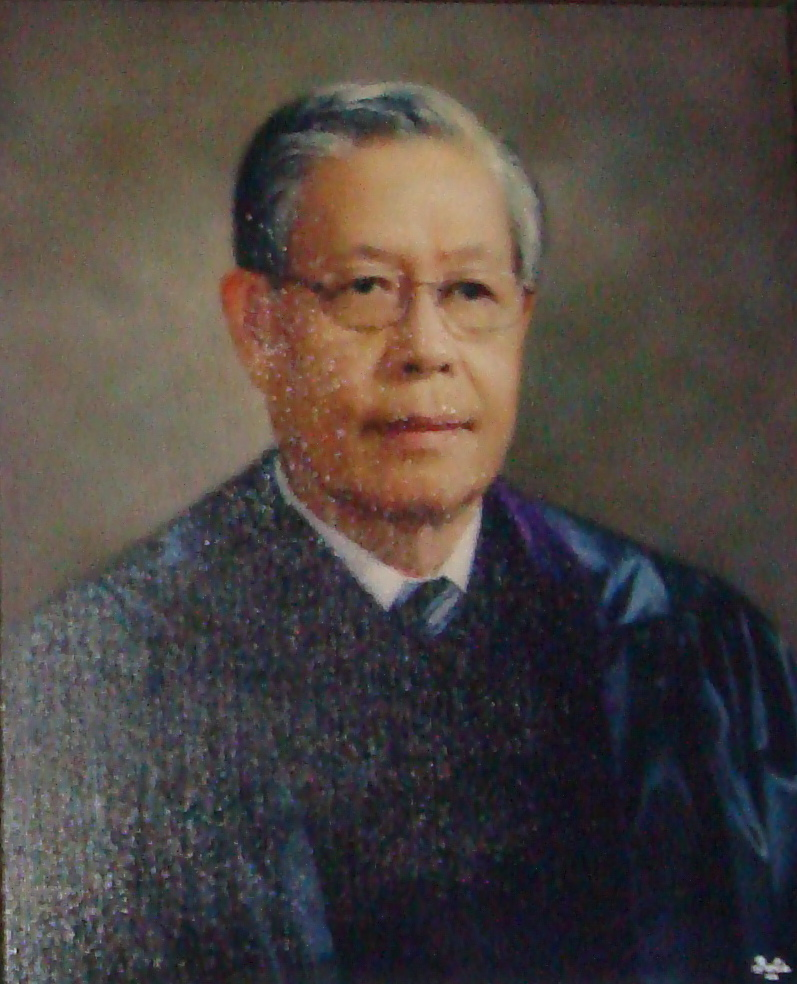
- Official portrait, taken c. 1998–2005

17th Permanent Representative of the Philippines to the United Nations
- In office February 24, 2007 – April 29, 2010
- Nominated by: Gloria Macapagal Arroyo
- Preceded by: Lauro Baja
- Succeeded by: Libran N. Cabactulan

20th Chief Justice of the Philippines
- In office November 30, 1998 – December 20, 2005
- Nominated by: Joseph Estrada
- Preceded by: Andres R. Narvasa
- Succeeded by: Artemio V. Panganiban

124th Associate Justice of the Supreme Court of the Philippines
- In office January 24, 1991 – November 29, 1998
- Nominated by: Corazon Aquino
- Preceded by: Irene R. Cortes
- Succeeded by: Minerva Gonzaga-Reyes

Chairman of the Commission on Elections
- In office February 15, 1988 – January 12, 1990
- Appointed by: Corazon Aquino
- Preceded by: Ramon Felipe Jr.
- Succeeded by: Haydee Yorac

Member of the Philippine Constitutional Commission
- In office June 2, 1986 – October 15, 1986

Mambabatas Pambansa (Assemblyman) from Region VII
- In office June 12, 1978 – June 5, 1984

Personal details
- Born: Hilario Gelbolingo Davide; December 20, 1935 (age 90) Argao, Cebu, Commonwealth of the Philippines
- Party: Pusyon Bisaya
- Spouse: Virginia Jimenea Perez
- Children: 5, including Hilario III
- Parent(s): Hilario P. Davide Sr. (father); Josefa L. Gelbolingo (mother)
- Occupation: Lawyer; academic; diplomat; legislator; writer; trustee

Hilario Gelbolingo Davide Jr. (born December 20, 1935) is a Filipino lawyer, professor, diplomat, constitutionalist and former politician, who served as the 20th chief justice of the Philippines and permanent representative of the Permanent Mission of the Republic of the Philippines to the United Nations. As constitutionalist, Davide led the creation of the legislative branch, and also wrote the most resolutions and the bulk of the 1987 Constitution of the Philippines.

== Early life and career ==
The sixth of seven siblings, Davide was born in Barangay Colawin, in Argao, Cebu to Hilario Panerio Davide Sr. (1904–2006), a retired Schools Division Superintendent, and Josefa Lopez Gelbolingo, a former public school teacher. Davide Sr. though lacking in funds, ensured all his children finished college. The children were disciplined from the beginning, and the boys had to learn how to gather tubo (sugarcane). The young dodong (boy) Jun enjoyed riding on a sledge harnessed by a carabao to gather tubo. No leisure was allowed until schoolwork and house chores were completed. He completed his primary education at Argao Central Elementary School and secondary education at Abellana Vocational High School. In college, he went to the country's premier state university, the University of the Philippines Diliman, Quezon City where he earned his Associate in Arts in 1955, his Bachelor of Science in Jurisprudence in 1958, and his Bachelor of Laws degree in 1959. In his first year of law he joined the honor society, "Order of the Purple Feather", then in his last year was a member of two honor societies called Phi Kappa Phi and Pi Gamma Mu. In addition, Davide edited for the school journal, the Philippine Law Journal. He took and passed the bar examinations given that same year.

From 1959 to 1963, Davide worked as private secretary to the vice-governor and later governor of the province of Cebu.

From 1962 to 1968, he was a faculty member of the College of Law of Southwestern University in Cebu City. This university, three decades later, would confer on him an honorary degree of Doctor of Laws in 1999.

== Legislator and 1971 constitutionalist ==
Davide's first opportunity to get into the national scene was when he was elected as Delegate of the 4th District of Cebu to the 1971 Constitutional Convention (CONCON). He became Chairman of the Committee on Duties and Obligations of Citizens and Ethics of Public Officials. He was among three delegates who introduced the most number of reform proposals. The reforms adopted under the Constitutional Convention were, however, short-lived. Public unrest over deteriorating economic conditions and the suppression of political rights, as well as the desire of then-President Ferdinand Marcos to perpetuate himself in power, heralded the declaration of martial law in 1972.

In 1978, he was elected assemblyman for Cebu in the Interim Batasang Pambansa under the opposition party Pusyon Bisaya and became one of martial law's staunch critics. As an oppositionist in the ruling party-dominated legislative body, he was its first minority floor leader. He filed the most number of bills of national significance, as well as resolutions to lift martial law. He also sought legislative investigations of graft and corruption in government and reported violations of human rights.

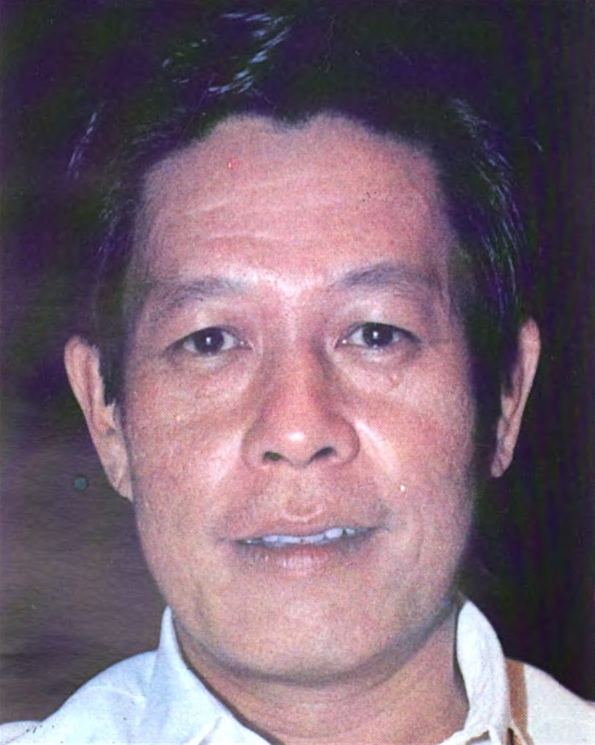
Davide as a member of the 1986 Constitutional Commission

== 1986 constitutionalist ==
After the overthrow of the Marcos regime through the People Power revolt in February 1986, then-President Corazon C. Aquino convened the Philippine Constitutional Commission of 1986 and appointed Davide as one of its 50 commissioners. He argued in favor of a unicameral legislature for government instead of a bicameral system, reasoning that "It is not only efficient and less costly to maintain but it is also simpler, less time-consuming and invites minimum conflicts and controversies, thus, facilitating speedy legislation." However, the Commission ultimately voted 23 to 22 in favor of bicameralism. He led the legislative branch article as chairman and filed the most resolutions including Resolution No. 9 which added legislative approval on martial law and a limited period on its validity.

== Commission on Elections and 1989 coup ==
In February 1988, President Aquino appointed Davide as Chairman of the Commission on Elections (COMELEC). He was the principal sponsor of the COMELEC's Rules of Procedure.

However, his stint in the COMELEC was cut short when President Aquino appointed him as chairman of the Presidential Fact-Finding Commission to investigate the December 1, 1989, coup attempt in which military rebels meant to oust President Aquino. This presidential commission was tasked to conduct an investigation on the rebellion and the possible involvement of military and civilian officials and private persons. Furthermore, Congress passed Republic Act No. 6832 that enhanced the presidential commission's power through a broader Fact-Finding Commission to conduct a thorough investigation of the failed coup d'état and recommend measures to prevent the occurrence of similar attempts at a violent seizure of power.

== Supreme Court ==
=== Associate justice ===
On January 24, 1991, Davide was appointed by then-President Aquino as associate justice of the Supreme Court. From January 2, 1996, to August 30, 1997, he sat as a member of the Senate Electoral Tribunal. He was also the working chairman of the court's Third Division from January 2, 1996, to September 7, 1997, and chairman of the House of Representative Electoral Tribunal from September 1, 1997, to November 30, 1998.

=== Chief justice ===
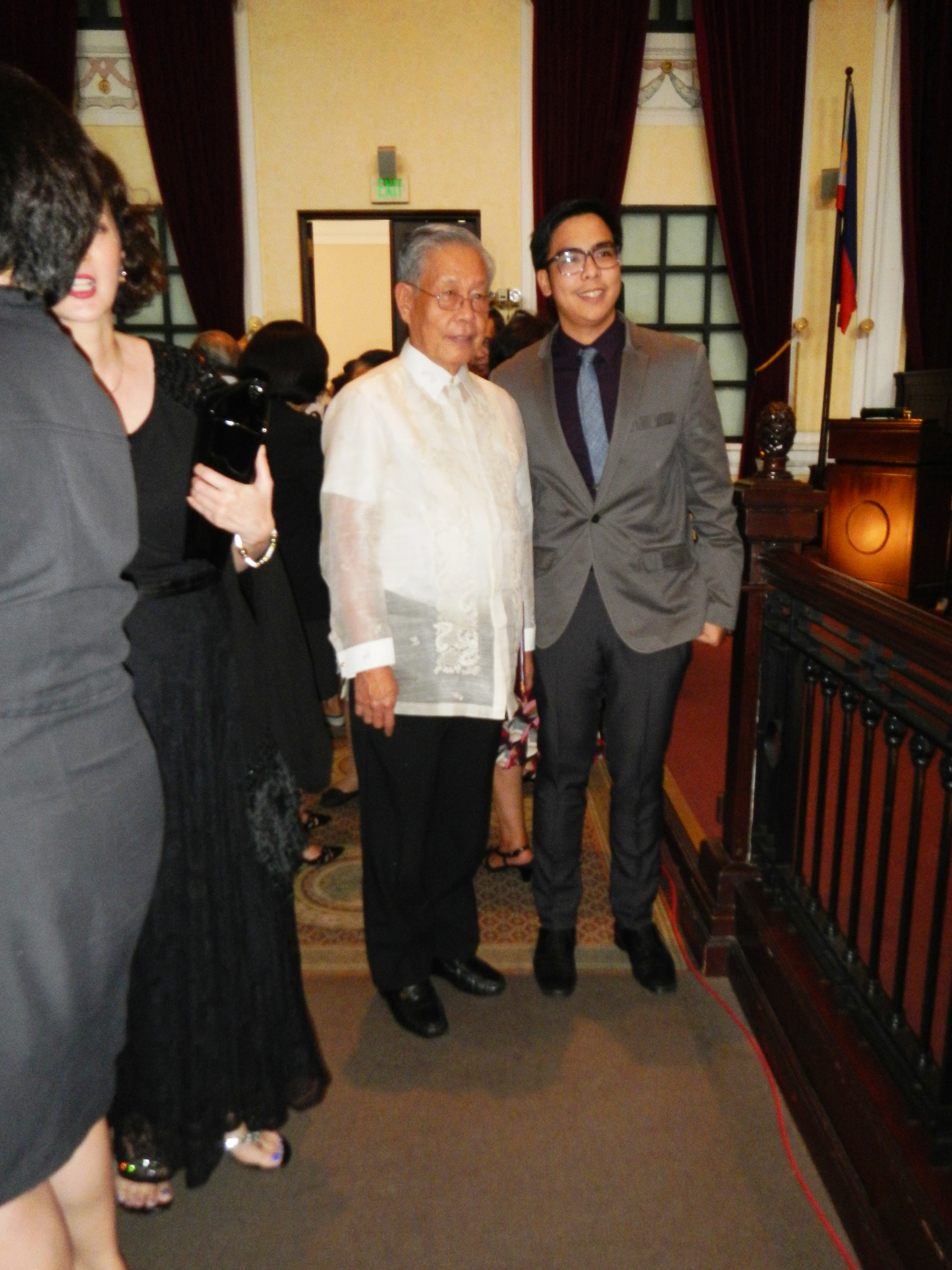
Hilario G. Davide Jr. (Andres Narvasa eulogy with grandson Atty. Carlo Narvasa).

On November 30, 1998, he was appointed by President Joseph Estrada as the 20th chief justice of the Supreme Court of the Philippines. He took his oath of office at the new Bonifacio Shrine in the City of Manila. He became known as the Centennial and Millennial Chief Justice.

He was the presiding judge in the impeachment trial against President Estrada that began in December 2000. On January 16, 2001, when Chief Justice Davide was about to decide to open an envelope of bank documents as evidence in the trial, he was preempted by Senator Francisco Tatad who motioned for the Senate to vote on the opening instead, resulting in a narrow vote against it. The vote was anticipated, with a planned walkout by the prosecution pushing through upon hearing the votes, inciting the EDSA II protest movement which ousted Estrada from office. Davide was credited with a timely intervention on behalf of "the welfare and will of the people" by administering the oath of office as president to then-Vice President Gloria Macapagal Arroyo. By declaring her the constitutional successor it averted potential violence and military takeover of power, and brought the crisis to an end. Although the moral authority of the Supreme Court carried the day, Davide's action was further bolstered by a precedent-setting Supreme Court decision, effectively putting an end to the question of the legitimacy of Arroyo's succession to power.

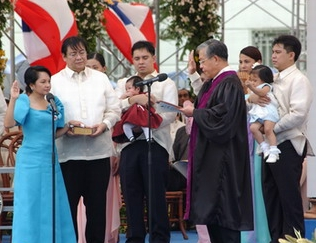
Chief Justice Davide, presiding the 2004 oath taking of Gloria Macapagal Arroyo as President of the Philippines.

On October 23, 2003, Chief Justice Davide was impeached by the House of Representatives, with the minimum one-thirds vote threshold reached in Congress for an impeachment complaint authored by Tarlac Representative Gibo Teodoro and Camarines Sur Representative Felix William Fuentebella of the seven "Brat Pack" congressmen. However, because the complaint came within one year after another impeachment complaint against Davide filed by former President Estrada and lawyer Rene Saguisag on June 2, the Supreme Court struck down the impeachment proceedings as unconstitutional.

=== Post-judicial career ===
Davide retired as chief magistrate on December 20, 2005, after he reached the mandatory retirement age of 70.

However, on January 24, 2006, President Arroyo appointed him as senior presidential adviser on electoral reforms during a Council of State meeting convened by the president. He recommended measures and policies to the president that would help reform the country's electoral system.

== United Nations ==
Davide served as ambassador and permanent representative of the Permanent Mission of the Philippines to the United Nations in New York City. He assumed this post in February 2007. Shortly after his assumption, he was elected vice chairman of the Economic and Social Council (ECOSOC), one of the main organs of the United Nations. He resigned his post on April 1, 2010.

== Aborted truth commission ==
On June 30, 2010, President Noynoy Aquino announced that Davide will head a truth commission that will investigate important issues in the country.

However in December 7, 2010, the commission was struck down in Biraogo v. Philippine Truth Commission. The court stated that the president had the power to create the commission and that it would aid the ombudsman's power to investigate anomalies in the government. However, it violated the equal protection clause for allowing Davide to only lead in the investigation of the anomalies of the Arroyo administration, which just recently ended at that time.

== Post-political career ==
Davide has been the independent director of the Manila Bulletin since March 31, 2011. He also serves as trustee at the University of San Carlos, and independent director of Megawide Corporation and Philtrust Bank. (Note: Davide works mostly at home in No. 2 H.C. Moncado St., BF Homes, Quezon City)

== Awards ==
In 2011 Davide was awarded one of the highest honor of the Holy See, the Knight Grand Cross of the Pontifical Order of St. Sylvester, by decree of Pope Benedict XVI.

Hilario Davide is the recipient of many awards. In 2002, he was conferred the Ramon Magsaysay Award for Government Service—a singular honor that is the Asian equivalent of the Nobel Prize. He was recognized for his life of principled citizenship and his profound service to democracy and the rule of law in the Philippines.

Apart from the Magsaysay Award, he is also the recipient of the 2005 Most Distinguished Alumnus Award given by the University of the Philippines Alumni Association; the 2003 Man of the Year Award by the Philippine Free Press; the 2000 Filipino of the Year Award by the Philippine Daily Inquirer; the 2001 Rule of Law Award; the 1999 The Outstanding Filipino Award in Environmental Law; the 2003 Chief Justice Roberto Concepcion Award for Legal Aid by the Integrated Bar of the Philippines; and 13 honorary degrees in doctoral in law and humanities.

In August 2006, he was conferred the ABA International Rule of Law Award in recognition of his extraordinary leadership in advancing the Rule of Law by the American Bar Association (ABA) Rule of Law Initiative on the occasion of the ABA's 2006 Annual Convention.

Hilario G. Davide Jr. was also the supreme commander of the Order of the Knights of Rizal and was conferred the highest rank, Knight Grand Cross of Rizal.

=== World Justice Project ===
Hilario G. Davide Jr. serves as an honorary co-chair for the World Justice Project. The World Justice Project works to lead a global, multidisciplinary effort to strengthen the rule of law for the development of communities of opportunity and equity.

== Personal life ==
Davide's father and namesake Hilario Sr. built such a reputation in Argao that the whole immediate family was named the ABS-CBN Bayaning Pamilyang Pilipino of the Year in 1997. Hilario Jr.'s brother Romulo Davide (born March 1932) is a Magsaysay Awardee and was hailed by the same foundation as the Father of Plant Nematology. On August 8, 2024, Romulo was proclaimed as a National Scientist of the Philippines for his work in nematology and plant pathology.

Jun, as many call him, is married to Surigao native Virginia (Gigi) Jimenea Perez. They met while working for Governor Francisco Remotigue. They have five children, namely: Hilario III (a lawyer, former city councilor of Cebu City and Governor of Cebu); Joseph Bryan Hilary (a law graduate), Sheryl Ann (a doctor), Noreen (a Master in SPED graduate), and Delster Emmanuel (an architect) and fourteen grandchildren including namesake Hilario Jose IV, son of Joseph Bryan.

Davide maintains a gardening hobby. As he stated:

Plants are better than people, they bloom for you, adorn your surroundings and give you peace and quiet. [Unlike plants,] people argue with you and sometimes make life miserable for you .

== See also ==
- Chief Justice of the Supreme Court of the Philippines
- Gloria Macapagal Arroyo

== Notes ==
Legal offices
Preceded by Lauro L. Baja Jr.	Philippine Permanent Representative to the United Nations; 2006–2010	Succeeded by Libran N. Cabactulan
Preceded by Ramon H. Felipe Jr.	COMELEC Chairman; 1988–1989	Succeeded by Haydee Yorac
Preceded by Irene R. Cortes	Associate Justice of the Supreme Court of the Philippines; 1991–1998	Succeeded by Minerva Gonzaga-Reyes
Preceded by Andres Narvasa	Chief Justice of the Supreme Court of the Philippines; 1998–2005	Succeeded by Artemio V. Panganiban
Preceded by Constituency created	Assemblyman for Region VIII with Natalio B. Bacalso, Bartolome C. Cabangbang, Eutiquio C. Cimafranca, Alfonso N. Corominas Jr., Filemon L. Fernandez, Jorge M. Kintanar, Valentino L. Legaspi, Mariano R. Logarta, Enrique L. Medina Jr., Dominador M. Pernes, Jesus L. Villegas, Julian B. Yballe; 1978–1984	Succeeded by Constituency abolished
