= 2009 in Philippine television =

The following is a list of events affecting Philippine television in 2009. Events listed include television show debuts, finales, cancellations, and channel launches, closures and rebrandings, as well as information about controversies and carriage disputes.

== Events ==
- January 12 - Judy Ann Santos and Ryan Agoncillo win the 1.3 million pesos of Kapamilya, Deal or No Deal.
- January 28 - Maribuena Noche wins the 1.756 million pesos of Kapamilya, Deal or No Deal.
- February 1 - DTH satellite TV provider Cignal was officially launched.
- February 2 - Gerald Anderson and Jake Cuenca win the 2 million pesos of Kapamilya, Deal or No Deal.
- February 9 - ABS-CBN TV-10 Batangas launches TV Patrol Southern Tagalog as an originating station broadcast around Batangas and across Calabarzon, which has been owned by the Regional Network Group.
- February 16 - Christopher Viray wins the 1.6 million pesos of Kapamilya, Deal or No Deal.
- May 22 - A victory party for Manny "Pacman" Pacquiao, who just became the new IBO (International Boxing Organization) and Ring Magazine Light Welterweight Champion, was held at the Renaissance Hotel in Makati, in partnership with GMA Network, Inc. Solar and GMA executives at that time signed for a partnership in TV coverage of Manny Pacquiao's upcoming boxing matches.
- July 30 - Eat Bulaga! celebrated its 30th anniversary.
- August 1 - When Cory Aquino died, her death and funeral was given a full scale media coverage.
- August 3 - In the episode of Wowowee, during which the show was interrupted for live coverage of the transfer of President Cory Aquino's remains from La Salle Greenhills to the Manila Cathedral, Revillame said that he could not make people happy while the entire country was mourning. The Alliance of Filipino Journalists denounced his remarks as a sign of disrespect towards Aquino. Revillame said he had no intention of defaming the former president and her family.
- October 3 - Jude Matthew Servilla was hailed as Eat Bulaga!'s Birit Baby 2009 Grand Winner.
- October 8 – The Ateneo de Manila University Blue Eagles clinched the UAAP Season 72 men's basketball title after defeating the University of the East Red Warriors 2–1 in winner take-all game 3 of the best-of-three finals series held at the Smart Araneta Coliseum in Quezon City. This was their back-to-back basketball championship title since UAAP Season 51.
- October 23 - Pilipinas, Game KNB?, the longest-running game show, ended broadcast after 8 years.
- November 4 - ABS-CBN launches the Christmas song Star ng Pasko, after the news program TV Patrol World.
- November 29 - Solar rebranded C/S9 as Solar TV at 11:00am with a slogan It's A Bright New World on RPN. On October 31, 2010, it changed some of its programming content to English/Tagalog with a new slogan Kung Saan Lahat Panalo!.
- Unknown - PLDT (under its myDSL brand) launched a livestreaming service to allowed a free binge-watch access on TV channels, PLDT Watchpad.

== Premieres ==
Date	Show
January 2	I Propose on ETC (SBN 21)
January 3	Kanipan on Hero
January 3	My Melody on Hero
January 3	Kapuso Movie Festival (Saturday edition) on GMA 7
January 4	Fortune Quest on Hero
January 5	Love at the Corner on GMA 7
January 5	Parekoy on ABS-CBN 2
January 5	Mischievous Princess on ABS-CBN 2
January 7	Elemental Gerad on Hero
January 9	Sugar Sugar Rune on Hero
January 10	Transformers: Cybertron on ABS-CBN 2
January 10	Ultraman Max on ABS-CBN 2
January 11	Totally Spies Undercover on ABS-CBN 2
January 14	American Idol season 8 on Q 11
January 15	Models NYC on ETC (SBN 21)
January 19	Tayong Dalawa on ABS-CBN 2
January 19	Daisy Siete: Tarzariray: Amasonang Kikay on GMA 7
January 25	Balls & Stick on UNTV 37
January 29	Monster Rancher on Hero
February 2	Ang Babaeng Hinugot sa Aking Tadyang on GMA 7
February 2	May Bukas Pa on ABS-CBN 2
February 2	Bakugan Battle Brawlers on Hero
February 2	Izumo on Hero
February 3	Voltes V Evolution on Hero
February 5	Yu-Gi-Oh! Duel Monsters on Hero
February 7	Atashin'chi on Hero
February 9	TV Patrol Southern Tagalog on ABS-CBN TV-10 Batangas
February 13	Survivor: Tocantins on Q 11
February 14	Komiks Presents: Flash Bomba on ABS-CBN 2
February 16	LaLola on GMA 7
February 16	Paano Ba ang Mangarap? on GMA 7
February 16	Fated To Love You on GMA 7
February 16	Ruffa & Ai on ABS-CBN 2
February 16	SNN: Showbiz News Ngayon on ABS-CBN 2
February 18	Major (season 2) on Hero
February 18	Bokura ga Ita on Hero
February 18	Love Hina on Hero
February 19	Happiness! on Hero
February 19	Rumbling Hearts on Hero
February 21	Prétear on Hero
February 22	Wow Mali on TV5
February 23	Totoy Bato on GMA 7
February 24	Outrageous and Courageous on GMA 7
February 27	Lokomoko High on TV5
March 1	Joey's Quirky World on GMA 7
March 1	Ironman 28 on Hero
March 2	Dapat Ka Bang Mahalin? on GMA 7
March 2	Machine Robo Rescue on Hero
March 6	Quarterlife on ETC (SBN 21)
March 6	Digimon Adventure 02 on Hero
March 6	Rune Soldier on Hero
March 9	All About Eve on GMA 7
March 10	Ranma ½ on TV5
March 13	OFW Diaries on GMA 7
March 13	Gundam Seed Destiny on Hero
March 14	Cool Center on GMA 7
March 16	Chil Princesses on GMA 7
March 18	Wow Hayop on GMA 7
March 19	I Survived: Hindi Sumusuko Ang Pinoy on ABS-CBN 2
March 19	Knight Ramune NG on Hero
March 21	Astro Boy on Hero
March 22	D.I.C.E. on Hero
March 22	Shaman King on Hero
March 22	D. C.: Da Capo on Hero
March 23	Gokusen (season 3) on GMA 7
March 23	Zorro on GMA 7
March 26	SRO Cinemaserye: Ganti on GMA 7
March 30	Hot Shot on ABS-CBN 2
March 30	Pinoy Bingo Night on ABS-CBN 2
April 7	Koi Koi Seven on Hero
April 9	Ikki Tousen on Hero
April 10	Friday Night Lights (season 3) on ETC (SBN 21)
April 10	Privileged on ETC (SBN 21)
April 10	Digimon Tamers on Hero
April 13	Pokémon: Master Quest on GMA 7
April 15	Inuyasha on Hero
April 18	Dash! Yonkuro on Hero
April 19	Jollitown (season 2) on GMA 7
April 20	Hole in the Wall on GMA 7
April 20	Daisy Siete: Kambalilong on GMA 7
April 20	Kambal sa Uma on ABS-CBN 2
April 20	Naruto on Hero
April 20	Hana Yori Dango on Hero
April 21	CBS Evening News on Q 11
April 26	Angelic Layer on Hero
April 27	Primera Balita on GMA Dagupan
April 27	Only You on ABS-CBN 2
April 27	Hani Hani: Operation Sanctuary on Hero
May 1	Pinoy Myx on Myx
May 2	Komiks: Nasaan Ka Maruja? on ABS-CBN 2
May 4	Nodame Cantabile on GMA 7
May 4	Precious Hearts Romances Presents: Bud Brothers on ABS-CBN 2
May 4	Relationship Rehab on Q 11
May 6	Naruto Shippuden on Hero
May 10	Your Song Presents: Boystown on ABS-CBN 2
May 10	Power of 10 on GMA 7
May 10	School Rumble on Hero
May 11	Boys Over Flowers on ABS-CBN 2
May 13	Akazukin Chacha on Hero
May 15	Digimon Frontier on Hero
May 16	Are You the Next Big Star? on GMA 7
May 17	Dear Friend: Madrasta on GMA 7
May 18	The Adventures of Little Carp on TV5
May 22	Voltron on Hero
May 23	Who Wants to Be a Millionaire? on TV5
May 25	One Liter of Tears on GMA 7
May 27	You're Under Arrest on Hero
May 28	SRO Cinemaserye: Suspetsa on GMA 7
May 30	Power Rangers Operation Overdrive on ABS-CBN 2
May 30	Mamotte! Lollipop on Hero
June 1	Najica Blitz Tactics on Hero
June 1	Eternal Alice on Hero
June 1	Ursula's Kiss on Hero
June 6	Happy Land on GMA 7
June 8	Ngayon at Kailanman on GMA 7
June 8	Adik Sa'Yo on GMA 7
June 10	Transformers: Cybertron on Hero
June 14	George and Cecil on ABS-CBN 2
June 15	Love or Bread on ABS-CBN 2
June 17	Probe Profiles on ABS-CBN 2
June 19	Digimon Savers on Hero
June 20	Lemon Angel Project on Hero
June 22	Kung Aagawin Mo ang Lahat sa Akin on GMA 7
June 22	Cruel Love on GMA 7
June 24	Kiba on Hero
June 26	Masked Rider Hibiki on TV5
June 29	Pokémon: Advanced on GMA 7
June 29	All My Life on GMA 7
June 29	The Wedding on ABS-CBN 2
June 29	Pretty Cure on Hero
July 1	Ghost Hunt on Hero
July 3	Koi Koi Seven on Hero
July 4	Project Arms on Hero
July 4	Knight Hunters on Hero
July 5	Your Song: Gaano Kita Kamahal on ABS-CBN 2
July 5	Wandaba Style on Hero
July 6	Maria de Jesus: Ang Anghel sa Lansangan on ABS-CBN 2
July 6	Rosalinda on GMA 7
July 8	Hitman Reborn! on Hero
July 11	Hareluya Boy on Hero
July 12	Inspector Fabre on Hero
July 18	Monkey Magic on Hero
July 18	Wolverine and the X-Men on ABS-CBN 2
July 19	Front Act on TV5
July 19	G&G: Goals & Girls on TV5
July 20	Daisy Siete: Chacha Muchacha on GMA 7
July 22	Moomin on Hero
July 23	SRO Cinemaserye: The Eva Castillo Story on GMA 7
July 23	The Twelve Kingdoms on Hero
July 24	Mirmo de Pon! on Hero
July 24	Wind: A Breath of Heart on Hero
July 25	Najica Blitz Tactics on Hero
July 27	C/S Movie Mania on C/S 9
August 1	Gundam Seed on Hero
August 2	Utawarerumono on Hero
August 3	Mr. Bean on ABS-CBN 2
August 4	My Bride Is a Mermaid on Hero
August 5	Saiyuki on Hero
August 8	Cheeky Angel on Hero
August 9	Daigunder on Hero
August 10	Miss No Good on ABS-CBN 2
August 10	Blue Dragon on ABS-CBN 2
August 10	Darna on GMA 7
August 12	Project Runway Philippines season 2 on ETC (SBN 21)
August 12	Genma Wars on Hero
August 15	Agimat: Ang Mga Alamat ni Ramon Revilla: Tiagong Akyat on ABS-CBN 2
August 15	Kimba the White Lion on Hero
August 17	Wandaba Style on Hero
August 19	Atashin'chi on Hero
August 20	SRO Cinemaserye: Rowena Joy on GMA 7
August 21	Cosmo Warrior Zero on Hero
August 23	Show Me Da Manny on GMA 7
August 24	Katorse on ABS-CBN 2
August 24	Dahil May Isang Ikaw on ABS-CBN 2
August 24	Fushigi Yuugi on TV5
August 25	Sasami: Magical Girls Club on Hero
August 30	GetBackers on Hero
August 31	Game About Love on GMA 7
August 31	Shining Inheritance on GMA 7
August 31	Precious Hearts Romances Presents: Ang Lalaking Nagmahal Sa Akin on ABS-CBN 2
August 31	Lemon Angel Project on Hero
September 1	Giant Robo on Hero
September 3	Happiness! on Hero
September 4	Aquarion on Hero
September 7	Florinda on ABS-CBN 2
September 7	Last Romance on GMA 7
September 7	Kuwentong Talentado on TV5
September 10	Moomoo and Me on TV5
September 10	Angelic Layer on Hero
September 11	Mermaid Saga on Hero
September 14	Stairway to Heaven on GMA 7
September 15	Glee on ETC (SBN 21)/Jack TV
September 17	SRO Cinemaserye: Reunion on GMA 7
September 19	News and Views with Abel Cruz on IBC 13
September 21	Ikaw Sana on GMA 7
September 22	Cat's Eye on Hero
September 24	Wandaba Style on Hero
September 27	Your Song: Someone to Love on ABS-CBN 2
September 27	Bakugan Battle Brawlers on Hero
September 28	Kaya Kong Abutin ang Langit on GMA 7
September 28	Tinik sa Dibdib on GMA 7
September 28	Lovers in Paris on ABS-CBN 2
September 28	Hayate the Combat Butler on Q 11
September 29	Popolocrois on Hero
September 30	Banana Split Daily Servings on ABS-CBN 2
October 2	Kanipan on Hero
October 2	Monster Ranchers on Hero
October 3	Godannar on Hero
October 4	Pinoy Big Brother: Double Up on ABS-CBN 2
October 4	Soul Link on Hero
October 7	Magical Canan on Hero
October 11	Giant Robo on Hero
October 11	ASEAN Basketball League on TV5
October 11	Mirmo de Pon! on Hero
October 12	Nagsimula sa Puso on ABS-CBN 2
October 12	Tank Knights Portriss on Hero
October 16	The Marshmallow Times on Hero
October 17	Bitoy's Showwwtime on GMA 7
October 17	Power Rangers Jungle Fury on ABS-CBN 2
October 19	Family Feud (season 2) on GMA 7
October 19	Daisy Siete: My Shuper Sweet Lover on GMA 7
October 19	Precious Hearts Romances Presents: Somewhere in My Heart on ABS-CBN 2
October 20	Major (season 3) on Hero
October 22	SRO Cinemaserye: Moshi-Moshi, I Love You on GMA 7
October 24	Failon Ngayon on ABS-CBN 2
October 24	Showtime on ABS-CBN 2
October 24	Sarap at Home on Q 11
October 25	BandaOke! Rock 'N Roll to Millions on GMA 7
October 25	Chi on IBC 13
October 31	Kulilits on ABS-CBN 2
October 31	By Request on IBC 13
November 1	Sine Komiks on IBC 13
November 2	Freestyle on GMA 7
November 8	Eateria on GMA 7
November 9	Tori & Dean: Home Sweet Hollywood on 2nd Avenue (RJTV 29)
November 9	Hi-5 Series 11 on TV5
November 9	On Air on GMA 7
November 9	IBC News Tonight on IBC 13
November 9	Gatchaman on Hero
November 12	The Riches on 2nd Avenue (RJTV 29)
November 12	SRO Cinemaserye: Carenderia Queen on GMA 7
November 13	Utawarerumono on Hero
November 14	Agimat: Ang Mga Alamat ni Ramon Revilla: Pepeng Agimat on ABS-CBN 2
November 15	StarStruck season 5 on GMA 7
November 15	Mamotte! Lollipop on Hero
November 16	Starstruck Shoutout on GMA 7
November 17	Voltron on Hero
November 21	Shining Through on 2nd Avenue (RJTV 29)
November 22	Your Song: Sa Kanya Pa Rin on ABS-CBN 2
November 23	The Good Witch of the West on Hero
November 28	The Bottomline with Boy Abunda on ABS-CBN 2
November 29	Solar's Golden Ticket on Solar TV 9
November 30	Full House on GMA 7
November 30	RPN NewsCap on RPN 9
December 1	The Insider on Solar TV
December 1	Digimon Adventure on Hero
December 7	Tweetbiz: The Bizniz of Chizmiz on Q 11
December 7	Sana Ngayong Pasko on GMA 7
December 7	Precious Hearts Romances Presents: My Cheating Heart on ABS-CBN 2
December 10	SRO Cinemaserye: Exchange Gift on GMA 7
December 11	Transformers: Cybertron on Hero
December 18	Sunny Pig on Hero
December 19	Tropang Potchi on Q 11
December 20	The Good Witch of the West on Hero
December 23	Pani Poni on Hero
December 25	Kekkaishi on Hero

=== Unknown dates ===
- December: House of Hoops on Solar TV 9

=== Unknown ===
- Chances Are on Q 11
- Daddy-licious on Q 11
- Dare Duo on Q 11
- Events Incorporated on Q 11
- Full Time Moms on Q 11
- Just for Laughs Gags on Q 11
- Mommy Diary on Q 11
- My Favorite Recipes on Q 11
- RunnerSpeak on Q 11
- Tara! Lets Eat! on Q 11
- Word of Mouth on Q 11
- Teenage Mutant Ninja Turtles: Fast Forward on ABS-CBN 2
- The Millionaire Matchmaker on ETC (SBN 21)
- Modern Family on 2nd Avenue (RJTV 29)
- Clear Men Future League on Solar TV 9
- Solar's Golden Ticket on Solar TV 9
- TWBF (This Week's Big Five) on Solar TV 9
- Warriors: Celebrity Boxing Challenge on Solar TV 9
- Asenso Pinoy on NBN 4
- BizNews on NBN 4
- Congress In Action with Freddie Abando on NBN 4
- Ombudsman: Kakampi mo Laban sa Katiwalian on NBN 4
- Usapang Pulitika on NBN 4
- Straight to the Point on IBC 13
- Health Line on IBC 13
- Ultimatum on IBC 13
- Signs and Wonders on IBC 13
- Mommy Diary on GMA 7
- OC to the Max on GMA 7
- Ating Alamin on NBN 4
- On-Set: The World Class Filipino Artist on Net 25
- Red Carpet on Net 25
- Shop TV on 2nd Avenue (RJTV 29)
- The Middle on 2nd Avenue (RJTV 29)
- Hillsong Concert Specials on ZOE TV 33
- Stoplight TV on TV5
- Front Act on TV5
- Biyaheng Bulilit on TV5
- How 'Bout My Place Tonight on TV5
- MOG TV on TV5
- Promdi Chef on TV5
- Sabado Boys on TV5
- Super Slam Bang on TV5
- This New Life At Alabang New Life on TV5
- Urban Tribe on TV5
- URCC TV on TV5
- Nuebe Patrol on ABS-CBN TV-9 Pagadian
- Chismax: Chismis to the Max on DZMM TeleRadyo
- Tambalang Failon at Webb on DZMM TeleRadyo
- DOH: Department of Help on RHTV

== Returning or renamed programs ==
Show	Last aired	Retitled as/Season/Notes	Channel	Return date
American Idol	2008	Same (season 8)	Q	January 14
May Bukas Pa	2000 (IBC) / 2001 (RPN)	Same (2009)	ABS-CBN	February 2
Survivor	2008 (season 17: "Gabon")	Same (season 18: "Tocantins")	Q	February 13
Wow Mali Express	2008 (ABC)	Wow Mali	TV5	February 22
Philippine Basketball Association	2009 (season 34: "Philippine Cup")	Same (season 34: "Fiesta Conference")	C/S (now Solar TV) / Basketball TV	February 28
All About Eve	2005	Same (Philippine adaptation)	GMA	March 9
Gokusen	2007	Same (season 3)	GMA	March 23
Philippine Basketball League	2009 (season 26: "PG Flex Linoleum Cup")	Same (season 26: "PG Flex Unity Cup")	C/S (now Solar TV)	April 14
Jollitown	2008	Same (season 2)	GMA	April 19
Shakey's V-League	2008 (season 5: "2nd Conference")	Same (season 6: "1st Conference")	NBN	April 19
Only You	2006	Same (Philippine adaptation)	ABS-CBN	April 27
Who Wants to Be a Millionaire?	2002 (IBC)	Same	TV5	May 23
The Good Night Show	2008 (Q)	Jojo A. All the Way!	TV5	June 1
National Collegiate Athletic Association	2009	Same (season 85)	Studio 23	June 27
University Athletic Association of the Philippines	2009	Same (season 72)	Studio 23	July 11
Darna	2005	Same (2009)	GMA	August 10
Survivor Philippines	2008 (season 1)	Same (season 2: "Palau")	GMA	August 17
Stairway to Heaven	2005	Same (Philippine adaptation)	GMA	September 14
Lovers in Paris	2005	Same (Philippine adaptation)	ABS-CBN	September 28
Pinoy Big Brother	2007 (season 2)	Same (season 3: "Double Up")	ABS-CBN	October 4
Philippine Basketball Association	2009 (season 34: "Fiesta Conference")	Same (season 35: "Philippine Cup")	C/S (now Solar TV) / Basketball TV	October 11
Shakey's V-League	2009 (season 6: "1st Conference")	Same (season 6: "2nd Conference")	NBN	October 13
Family Feud	2009	Same (season 2)	GMA	October 19
National Basketball Association	2009	Same (2009–10 season)	C/S (now Solar TV) / Basketball TV	October 28
By Request	2004 (ABC)	Same	IBC	October 31
News Tonight	2009	IBC News Tonight	IBC	November 9
StarStruck	2007	Same (season 5)	GMA	November 15
Full House	2005	Same (Philippine adaptation)	GMA	November 30
Good Take	2005	Same	IBC	Unknown
Healthline	2008 (ABC)	Same	IBC	Unknown
Sabado Boys	2007 (RPN)	Same	TV5	Unknown

== Programs transferring networks ==
Date	Show	No. of seasons	Moved from	Moved to
February 2	May Bukas Pa	—N/a	IBC / RPN (now Solar TV) (as the original 2000 TV series)	ABS-CBN (as a remake)
March 10	Ranma ½	—N/a	GMA	TV5
May 23	Who Wants to Be a Millionaire?	—N/a	IBC	TV5
June 1	The Good Night Show	—N/a	Q	TV5 (as Jojo A. All the Way!)
October 31	By Request	—N/a	ABC (now TV5)	IBC
December	House of Hoops	—N/a	ABC (now TV5)	Solar TV
Unknown	Ating Alamin	—N/a	IBC	NBN
Unknown	Sabado Boys	—N/a	RPN (now Solar TV)	TV5
Unknown	Healthline	—N/a	ABC (now TV5)	IBC
Unknown	Signs and Wonders	—N/a	NBN	IBC
Unknown	Liga Pilipinas	—N/a	NBN	Solar Sports

== Finales ==
- January 2:
  - Sakurano (GMA 7)
  - Why Why Love (ABS-CBN 2)
- January 4:
  - Winx Club (ABS-CBN 2)
  - Skyland (ABS-CBN 2)
  - Fantastic Four (ABS-CBN 2)
- January 8: The Girls of the Playboy Mansion (ETC on SBN 21)
- January 9: Precious Time (ABS-CBN 2)
- January 14: Snoop Dogg's Father Hood (ETC on SBN 21)
- January 15: Beauty and the Geek (ETC on SBN 21)
- January 16:
  - Moms (Q 11)
  - Dyosa (ABS-CBN 2)
  - Daisy Siete: Tinderella (GMA 7)
- January 25: Pinoy Meets World (GMA 7)
- January 28: Kanipan (Hero)
- February 5: Rescue Mission (TV5)
- February 6:
  - LaLola (GMA 7)
  - Eva Fonda (ABS-CBN 2)
- February 7: Komiks Presents: Dragonna (ABS-CBN 2)
- February 13:
  - Money War (GMA 7)
  - Rosalinda (GMA 7)
  - Wanted Perfect Family (GMA 7)
  - Boy & Kris (ABS-CBN 2)
- February 15:
  - MP3 (TV5)
  - You and Me Against the World (TV5)
- February 17: Full Force Nature (GMA 7)
- February 20:
  - Gagambino (GMA 7)
  - Pinoy Fear Factor (ABS-CBN 2)
  - Lokomoko (TV5)
- February 27: Saan Darating ang Umaga? (GMA 7)
- March 4: UAAP Season 71 volleyball tournaments (Studio 23)
- March 6:
  - Luna Mystika (GMA 7)
  - Emergency (GMA 7)
- March 7: Kapuso Movie Festival (Saturday edition) (GMA 7)
- March 11: Masquerade (GMA 7)
- March 13: Be Strong, Geum-soon! (GMA 7)
- March 20: Love at the Corner (GMA 7)
- March 27:
  - Kapamilya, Deal or No Deal (season 3) (ABS-CBN 2)
  - Mischievous Princess (ABS-CBN 2)
- March 29: Fortune Quest (Hero)
- April 4: Prétear (Hero)
- April 10: Quarterlife (ETC on SBN 21)
- April 17:
  - Parekoy (ABS-CBN 2)
  - Daisy Siete: Tarzariray Amasonang Kikay (GMA 7)
- April 24: I Love Betty La Fea (ABS-CBN 2)
- April 25: Komiks Presents: Flash Bomba (ABS-CBN 2)
- April 30: OPM Myx (Myx)
- May 1:
  - Gokusen (season 3) (GMA 7)
  - Ang Babaeng Hinugot sa Aking Tadyang (GMA 7)
  - Pieta (ABS-CBN 2)
- May 9: Kakasa Ka Ba sa Grade 5? (season 2) (GMA 7)
- May 18: Survivor: Tocantins (Q 11)
- May 21:
  - American Idol season 8 (Q 11)
  - SRO Cinemaserye: Ganti (GMA 7)
  - Voltes V Evolution (Hero)
- May 22:
  - Nodame Cantabile (GMA 7)
  - Fated To Love You (GMA 7)
- May 23: Lovely Day (GMA 7)
- May 24:
  - Ultraman Max (ABS-CBN 2)
  - Shaman King (Hero)
  - The Prince of Tennis (Hero)
- May 26: Hani Hani: Operation Sanctuary (Hero)
- May 31:
  - Myxilog (Myx)
  - Bakbakan (ABS-CBN 2)
- June 5:
  - All About Eve (GMA 7)
  - Paano Ba ang Mangarap? (GMA 7)
- June 7: Dear Friend: Madrasta (GMA 7)
- June 10: Probe (ABS-CBN 2)
- June 12: Hot Shot (ABS-CBN 2)
- June 16: 2009 Shakey's V-League 1st Conference (NBN 4)
- June 19:
  - Dapat Ka Bang Mahalin? (GMA 7)
  - One Liter of Tears (GMA 7)
  - Masked Rider Blade (TV5)
- June 21: Your Song Presents: Boystown (ABS-CBN 2)
- June 26: Pinoy Bingo Night (ABS-CBN 2)
- July 3: Totoy Bato (GMA 7)
- July 12:
  - Jollitown (season 2) (GMA 7)
  - Transformers: Cybertron (ABS-CBN 2)
- July 16: SRO Cinemaserye: Suspetsa (GMA 7)
- July 17: Daisy Siete: Kambalilong (GMA 7)
- July 26: C/S Blockbusters (C/S 9)
- August 7:
  - Love or Bread (ABS-CBN 2)
  - Zorro (GMA 7)
- August 8: Komiks: Nasaan Ka Maruja? (ABS-CBN 2)
- August 13: SRO Cinemaserye: The Eva Castillo Story (GMA 7)
- August 16:
  - Ful Haus (GMA 7)
  - Your Song: Gaano Kita Kamahal (ABS-CBN 2)
- August 21:
  - Boys Over Flowers (ABS-CBN 2)
  - Only You (ABS-CBN 2)
  - Toradora! (TV5)
- August 23: Are You the Next Big Star? (GMA 7)
- August 27: Cruel Love (GMA 7)
- August 28:
  - Chil Princesses (GMA 7)
  - Precious Hearts Romances Presents: Bud Brothers (ABS-CBN 2)
- August 29: Lipgloss (TV5)
- August 30: Voltron (Hero)
- August 31: Ha Ha Hayop (TV5)
- September 2: Wandaba Style (Hero)
- September 3:
  - Philippines Scariest Challenge (TV5)
  - Pretty Cure (Hero)
- September 4:
  - The Wedding (ABS-CBN 2)
  - LaLola (GMA 7)
- September 10: SRO Cinemaserye: Rowena Joy (GMA 7)
- September 11: Adik Sa'Yo (GMA 7)
- September 16:
  - Ursula's Kiss (Hero)
  - Genma Wars (Hero)
- September 18: All My Life (GMA 7)
- September 19:
  - Good Morning America (Velvet)
  - The View (Velvet)
- September 20: Good Morning America Weekend (Velvet)
- September 25:
  - Ngayon at Kailanman (GMA 7)
  - Kung Aagawin Mo ang Lahat sa Akin (GMA 7)
  - Tayong Dalawa (ABS-CBN 2)
- September 26: Power Rangers Operation Overdrive (ABS-CBN 2)
- September 28: Sasami: Magical Girls Club (Hero)
- October 2:
  - Florinda (ABS-CBN 2)
  - Games Uplate Live (ABS-CBN 2)
- October 5: Kalye, Mga Kwento ng Lansangan (ABS-CBN 2)
- October 8:
  - UAAP Season 72 basketball tournaments (Studio 23)
  - Happiness! (Hero)
- October 9:
  - Kambal sa Uma (ABS-CBN 2)
  - Miss No Good (ABS-CBN 2)
- October 10: Bitoy's Funniest Videos (GMA 7)
- October 11: G&G: Goals & Girls (TV5)
- October 15: SRO Cinemaserye: Reunion (GMA 7)
- October 16:
  - Hole in the Wall (season 1) (GMA 7)
  - Daisy Siete: Chacha Muchacha (GMA 7)
  - Precious Hearts Romances Presents: Ang Lalaking Nagmahal Sa Akin (ABS-CBN 2)
- October 18:
  - All-Star K! (GMA 7)
  - AM @ IBC (IBC 13)
- October 20: Ranma ½ (TV5)
- October 23:
  - Pilipinas, Game KNB? (ABS-CBN 2)
  - Ruffa & Ai (ABS-CBN 2)
- October 24:
  - Wonder Mom (ABS-CBN 2)
  - NCAA Season 85 basketball tournaments (Studio 23)
- October 25: Kay Susan Tayo! (GMA 7)
- October 30: Game About Love (GMA 7)
- November 1: Your Song: Someone to Love (ABS-CBN 2)
- November 5: SRO Cinemaserye: Moshi-Moshi, I Love You (GMA 7)
- November 6:
  - Last Romance (GMA 7)
  - News Tonight (IBC 13)
- November 7: Agimat: Ang Mga Alamat ni Ramon Revilla: Tiagong Akyat (ABS-CBN 2)
- November 13: Survivor Philippines: Palau (GMA 7)
- November 14: Celebrity Duets (season 3) (GMA 7)
- November 16: Aquarion (Hero)
- November 20: Freestyle (GMA 7)
- November 27: Rosalinda (GMA 7)
- November 28: C/S Movie Mania (C/S 9)
- December 1: 2009 Shakey's V-League 2nd Conference (NBN 4)
- December 2: Project Runway Philippines season 2 (ETC on SBN 21)
- December 3: SRO Cinemaserye: Carenderia Queen (GMA 7)
- December 4: Precious Hearts Romances Presents: Somewhere in My Heart (ABS-CBN 2)
- December 6: DoQmentaries (Q 11)
- December 11:
  - On Air (GMA 7)
  - Stairway to Heaven (GMA 7)
  - Lovers in Paris (ABS-CBN 2)
- December 17: Major (season 3) (Hero)
- December 19: Magical Canan (Hero)
- December 20: Your Song: Sa Kanya Pa Rin (ABS-CBN 2)
- December 22: Tank Knights Portriss (Hero)
- December 27: Power of 10 (GMA 7)

=== Unknown dates ===
- March: Draw the Line (Q 11)

=== Unknown ===
- Living It Up (Q 11)
- Chef to Go (Q 11)
- Unlimited Diving (NBN 4)
- Dare Duo (Q 11)
- Just for Laughs Gags (Q 11)
- Mommy Diary (Q 11)
- Word of Mouth (Q 11)
- You Women (Q 11)
- Kapayapaan Atin Ito (NBN 4)
- Negosyo Atbp. (NBN 4)
- Pananaw (NBN 4)
- Perspectives (NBN 4)
- Pilipinas Ngayon Na! (NBN 4)
- Republic Service (NBN 4)
- The Young Once (NBN 4)
- TranspoDOTCom (NBN 4)
- Busog Lusog (ABS-CBN 2)
- Wolverine and the X-Men (ABS-CBN 2)
- Pilipinas Sabong Sports (IBC 13)
- Straight to the Point (IBC 13)
- Ating Alamin (IBC 13)
- Lucida DS: United Shelter Health Show (IBC 13)
- Camera Café (GMA 7)
- Outrageous and Courageous (GMA 7)
- Mommy Diary (GMA 7)
- Chill Spot (ETC on SBN 21)
- A Round Of Golf (C/S 9)
- Premier Dart (C/S 9)
- Punch Out (C/S 9)
- Untamed Beauties (TV5)
- Value Vision (ZOE TV 33)
- All Hot Music (TV5)
- Shock Attack (TV5)
- I Am Ninoy (TV5)
- 3R (TV5)
- Arekup Video Zonkers (TV5)
- Flo (TV5)
- How 'Bout My Place Tonight (TV5)
- OMG (TV5)
- MP3 (TV5)
- Pulis! Pulis! (TV5)
- Super Slam Bang (TV5)
- The Weekend News with Ramon Bautista (TV5)
- Toogs (TV5)
- Toyz (TV5)
- Travel on a Shoestring (TV5)
- TV Patrol Northwestern Mindanao (ABS-CBN TV-9 Pagadian)
- Balls & Stick (UNTV 37)
- Showbiz Overload (UNTV 37)
- Iglesia ni Cristo Chronicles (Net 25)
- Pinky at Ricky sa Opinyon (DZMM TeleRadyo)
- Talkback sa DZMM (DZMM TeleRadyo)
- Tambalang Failon at Sanchez (DZMM TeleRadyo)

== Networks ==
=== Launches ===
- October 1: All Sports Network
- November 29: Solar TV
- November 30: Star Movies Asia

==== Unknown ====
- Global Pinoy Cinema

=== Rebranded ===
- August 19: Hallmark Channel Asia → Hallmark Channel Philippines

=== Closures ===
- July 15: C/S Origin
- November 28: C/S 9

=== Moving ===
- November 2: Iglesia Ni Cristo (Channel 22 moved to Channel 136)

== Births ==
- February 5: Carren Eistrup, singer and host of Eat Bulaga!
- June 23:
  - Xia Vigor, actress
  - Gaea Mischa, singer and actress
- June 26: Yesha Camile, actress
- July 12: Lilygem Yulores, actress
- July 27: Aya Domingo, actress
- August 28: Jana Agoncillo, actress
- October 12: Alexa Salcedo, singer and theater actress

== Deaths ==
- February 5: Roberto Gonzales, 66, actor best known for martial-arts roles (born 1942)
- February 10: Berting Labra, 76, film actor often in comic sidekick roles (born 1932)
- February 12: Cris Daluz, 75, character actor (born 1934)
- March 6: Francis Magalona, 44, actor, TV host, photographer and rapper and father of actors Elmo Magalona, Frank Magalona, Saab Magalona and Maxene Magalona (born 1964)
- March 16: Roland Dantes, 65, martial artist and actor & uncle of actor of Dingdong Dantes (born 1944)
- March 18: Pocholo Ramirez, 75, race car driver and television host and grandfather of Myx VJ Janine Ramirez (born 1933)
- March 21: Genoveva Matute, 93, writer (born 1915)
- April 4: Nelly Sindayen, 59, journalist and Time Magazine correspondent (born 1949)
- April 11: Tita Muñoz, film actress (born 1926/1927)
- April 16: Trinidad Etong, 44, the wife of Ted Failon (born 1965)
- April 27: Paraluman, 85, film actress (born 1923)
- June 13: Douglas Quijano, 64, talent manager (born 1944)
- July 2: Susan Fernandez, singer and activist (born 1956)
- July 28: Emilio Gancayco, 86, former jurist in the Supreme Court and grandfather of teen actress Erich Gonzales (born 1922)
- August 10: Tyrone Suarez, 39, former movie actor and model (born 1970)
- August 11: Kennely Ann Lacia-Binay a.k.a. Audrey Vizcara, 29, former movie actress and model, daughter-in-law of than-Makati mayor Jejomar Binay
- September 1: Alexis Tioseco, 28, Filipino-born Canadian film critic (born 1981)
- September 8: Rogelio Borja Flores, 74. former sports writer (born 1935)
- September 15: Espiridion Laxa, 79, incumbent chairman of film academy of the Philippines and film industry leader and pioneering independent film producer (born 1930)
- October 7: Alecks Pabico, 42, Filipino journalist (Philippine Center for Investigative Journalism) (born April 19, 1967)
- November 19: Johnny Delgado, 61, former actor and writer (born 1948)
- November 21: Bernard Bonnin, 71, former actor (born 1938)
- November 23: Victor Nuñez, 31, TV Reporter, UNTV 37 (born 1978)
- December 16: Gennie Q. Jota, 74, Executive Director of Family Rosary Crusade (born 1936)
- December 29: Mandy Saguin, 63, former TV host of Kaagapay and well known as "Super Doc" (born September 6, 1946)

== See also ==
- 2009 in television
