= 2009 in the Philippines =

- Decades: 1980s; 1990s; 2000s; 2010s; 2020s
- See also: List of years in the Philippines; films; television

2009 in the Philippines details events of note that happened in the Philippines in the year 2009.

== Incumbents ==
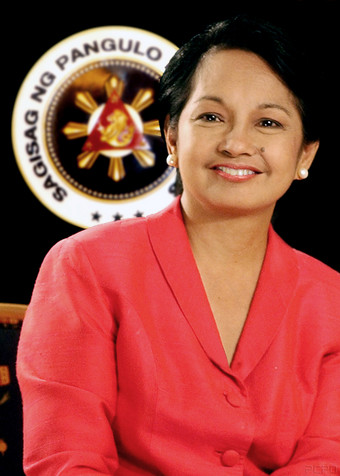
Gloria Macapagal
M. Arroyo

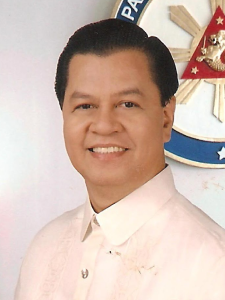
Noli L.
de Castro Jr.

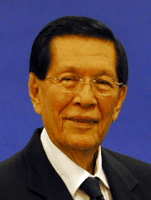
Juan Ponce F.
Enrile

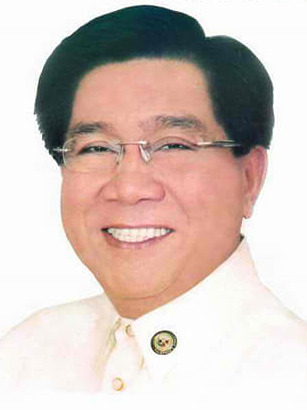
Prospero C.
Nograles

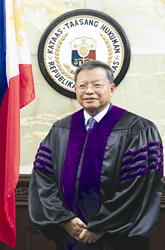
Reynato S.
Puno

- President: Gloria Macapagal Arroyo (Lakas-Kampi-CMD)
- Vice President: Noli de Castro (Independent)
- Senate President: Juan Ponce Enrile
- House Speaker: Prospero Nograles
- Chief Justice: Reynato Puno
- Philippine Congress: 14th Congress of the Philippines

== Events ==
=== January ===
- January 5
  - Criminal charges are filed against the son of DAR Secretary Nasser Pangandaman and four others in connection with the mauling of Delfin dela Paz and his 14-year-old son in the presence of Pangandaman himself.
  - Three Red Cross officials, Swiss Andreas Notter, Filipino Mary Jane Lacaba and Italian Eugenio Vagni are kidnapped. Andreas Notter and Mary Jane Lacaba were released four months later. Eugenio Vagni was released six months later on July 12.
- January 10 – Wide areas in Southern Mindanao are cut off from electrical power after explosions blamed on the Moro Islamic Liberation Front destroy main transmission lines in Lanao del Norte
- January 12 – Four officials of the Department of Justice take a leave of absence after being implicated in a bribery scandal involving efforts to release three wealthy young men charged with drug trafficking.
- January 14 – Former Batangas governor Antonio Leviste, formerly married to Senator Loren Legarda, is found guilty of homicide by a Makati trial court in connection with the 2007 shooting death of his long-time aide Rafael de las Alas.
- January 15 – As a result of the implementation of Republic Act 9511 one month earlier on December 1, 2008, privately owned National Grid Corporation of the Philippines (NGCP) took over the Philippine power grid from government-owned National Transmission Corporation (TransCo) which officially started NGCP to operate, manage, and maintain the country's power grid and its related facilities and assets, privatized the operations, maintenance, and management of the grid, and started the 25-year concession period and franchise and renewable for another 25 years with a total of 50 years.

=== May ===
- May 22 – The 2009 flu pandemic, which was an outbreak, enters the Philippines.

=== June ===
- June 22 – First death caused by H1N1 is confirmed in the Philippines and also first death in Asia.

=== August ===
- August 8 – Typhoon Morakot, locally known as Kiko, kills dozens of people, affected over 28,000 people in the Philippines.

=== September ===
- September 6 – At least nine people died after SuperFerry 9 with over 960 passengers on board sinks off the coast of the Zamboanga Peninsula. Thirty more are still unaccounted for.
- September 26 – Typhoon Ketsana locally known as Ondoy, causes widespread floods in Metro Manila and surrounding provinces, 25 provinces together with Metro Manila declaring a state of calamity and leaving 246 dead and 38 missing.

=== October ===
- October 17 – A Victoria Air Douglas DC-3 registered RP-C550 crashed shortly after takeoff on a flight to Puerto Princesa International Airport after an engine malfunctioned. The plane crashed near a factory in Las Piñas. All on board died.
- October 23 – Congress passed and President Gloria Macapagal Arroyo signed the Freeport Area of Bataan Act (Republic Act 9728), creating the Authority of the Freeport Area of Bataan (AFAB) and turned over the zone from Philippine Economic Zone Authority (PEZA) to AFAB which converted the Bataan Export Processing Zone/Bataan Economic Zone (BEPZ/BEZ), the first official economic zone in the Philippines located in Mariveles, Bataan, into Freeport Area of Bataan (FAB) upon the law's effectivity in July 2010 during the administration of Arroyo's successor Benigno Aquino III.

=== November ===
- November 18 – Renato Ebarle Jr., son of then-Presidential Chief of Staff Undersecretary is ambushed and killed inside his vehicle in Boni Serrano, Quezon City. The suspect was identified as Jason Aguilar Ivler, the son of book author Marlene Aguilar (sister of a singer Freddie Aguilar), he was captured after a shootout during the raid of NBI agents in his hideout in Quezon City in January 2010. 5 years later, Ivler was found guilty over the murder case, and sentenced into reclusion perpetua or up to 30 years in prison.
- November 20–27 – 5th Asian Youth Day is hosted by the Diocese of Imus at the Rogationist College Silang, Cavite
- November 23 – A massacre in Maguindanao kills at least 60 persons. President Gloria Macapagal Arroyo responded to the news of the massacre by declaring a state of emergency in Maguindanao, Sultan Kudarat and Cotabato City.
- November 25 – Dasmariñas becomes a component city in the province of Cavite through ratification of Republic Act 9723.

=== December ===
- December 4 – President Gloria Macapagal Arroyo officially places Maguindanao under a state of martial law. The declaration, also suspended the writ of habeas corpus in the province.
- December 10 – 18 hostages are released after at least 65 people are kidnapped by gunmen in Agusan del Sur.
- December 12 – President Arroyo lifts martial law in Maguindanao.
- December 22 – The Supreme Court reverses its ruling dated November 18, 2008 on the cityhood laws of the municipalities of Baybay, Leyte; Bogo, Cebu; Catbalogan, Samar; Tandag, Surigao del Sur; Lamitan, Basilan; Borongan, Eastern Samar; Tayabas, Quezon; Tabuk, Kalinga; Bayugan, Agusan del Sur; Batac, Ilocos Norte; Mati, Davao Oriental; Guihulngan, Negros Oriental; Cabadbaran, Agusan del Norte; El Salvador, Misamis Oriental; Carcar, Cebu and Naga, Cebu. Their respective cityhood status is effectively restored.

== Holidays ==
On November 13, 2002, Republic Act No. 9177 declares Eidul Fitr as a regular holiday. The EDSA Revolution Anniversary was proclaimed since 2002 as a special non-working holiday. Note that in the list, holidays in bold are "regular holidays" and those in italics are "nationwide special days".

- January 1 – **New Year's Day**
- February 25 – EDSA Revolution Anniversary
- April 9
  - **Araw ng Kagitingan** (Day of Valor)
  - **Maundy Thursday**
- April 10 – **Good Friday**
- May 1 – **Labor Day**
- June 12 – **Independence Day**
- August 21 – Ninoy Aquino Day
- August 30 – **National Heroes Day**
- September 19 – **Eid al-Fitr**
- November 1 – All Saints Day
- November 30 – **Bonifacio Day**
- December 25 – **Christmas Day**
- December 30 – **Rizal Day**
- December 31 – Last Day of the Year

In addition, several other places observe local holidays, such as the foundation of their town. These are also "special days."

== Entertainment and culture ==
- November 22
  - Miss Earth 2009 is hosted by the Philippines at the Boracay Convention Center. Larissa Ramos of Brazil won the pageant.
  - Efren Peñaflorida is declared as CNN Hero of the Year.

=== Concerts ===
- March 7 – Eraserheads Eraserheads Live the FINAL SET ! at the SM Mall of Asia
- March 14 – Journey: Revelation Tour live at SM Mall of Asia Field
- June 11 – The Pussycat Dolls: Doll Domination Tour at the SM Mall of Asia Concert Grounds
- August 11 – Lady Gaga: The Fame Ball Tour live at the Araneta Coliseum
- September 14 – Chicago live at the Araneta Coliseum
- November 14 – Katy Perry Hello Katy Tour live at the SM Mall of Asia Concert Grounds

== Sports ==
- February 11, **Basketball** – The Talk 'N Text Tropang Texters wins defeating the Alaska Aces 93–89 to win the 2008-09 PBA Philippine Cup Finals
- May 2, **Boxing** – Manny Pacquiao stops Ricky Hatton after two brutal rounds in a fight billed as "The Battle of East and West" in Las Vegas. During the 1st round, Pacquiao knocked down Hatton twice. In the 2nd round, Pacquiao continued to rain Hatton with furious combinations, eventually knocking him out with a thunderous left hook. For his win, Pacquiao took the IBO and The Ring light welterweight titles. The fight was named the knockout of the year.
- July 17, **Basketball** – The San Miguel Beermen wins defeating the Barangay Ginebra Gin Kings 90–79 to win the 2009 PBA Fiesta Conference Finals.
- October 8, **Basketball** – The Ateneo Blue Eagles wins defeating the UE Red Warriors 2–1 in their final series to win their fifth men's title in the UAAP Championships.
- October 26, **Basketball** – The San Sebastian Stags wins defeating the San Beda Red Lions with a score of 76–61, winning the NCAA Championships.
- November 14, **Boxing** – Manny Pacquiao defeats Miguel Cotto by a technical knockout with 2:05 left in the fight to become the only boxer to win a world title in seven different weight divisions. As well as to win Cotto's WBO welterweight title and the inaugural WBC Diamond Belt.
- December 9–18, **2009 Southeast Asian Games** – The Philippine Team Placed fifth place

== Births ==
- February 5 – Carren Eistrup, singer and entertaineron, child actor
- June 23 – Xia Vigor, child actress

== Deaths ==
- January 6 – Victor Sumulong, 62, incumbent mayor of Antipolo and former congressman (born 1946)
- January 10 – Anabel Bosch, 32, vocalist for rock bands as Elektrikcoolaid and Tropical Depression (born 1976)
- January 13 – Mary Ejercito, 103, mother of former President Joseph Estrada (born May 2, 1905)
- February 5 – Roberto Gonzales, 66, actor best known for martial-arts roles (born 1942)
- February 10 – Berting Labra, 76, film actor often in comic sidekick roles (born 1932)
- February 12 – Cris Daluz, 75, character actor (born 1934)
- March 6 – Francis Magalona, 44, actor, TV host, photographer, rapper, father of Maxene, Frank, Saab and Elmo Magalona and distant cousin of Cacai and Regine Velasquez (born 1964)
- March 15 – Miguel Bernad, 91, S.J., academic, critic, Philippine Star columnist (born 1917)
- March 16 – Roland Dantes, 65, martial artist and actor & uncle of actor of Dingdong Dantes (born 1944)
- March 18 – Pocholo Ramirez, 75, race car driver and television host and grandfather of Myx VJ Janine Ramirez (born 1933)
- March 21 – Genoveva Matute, 93, writer (born 1915)
- March 23 – Manuel del Rosario, 93, Catholic bishop of Malolos, Bulacan (born 1915)
- April 4 – Nelly Sindayen, 59, journalist and Time Magazine correspondent (born 1949)
- April 7 – Leo Prieto, 88, first Commissioner of the Philippine Basketball Association (born 1920)
- April 11 – Tita Muñoz, film actress (born 1926/1927)
- April 27 – Paraluman, 85, film actress (born 1923)
- April 28 – Lota Delgado, 90, actress (born 1918)
- May 16 – Prospero Amatong, 78, former Davao del Norte governor & congressman (born 1931)
- May 17 – Toch Arellano, 55, professional photographer (born 1953)
- May 28 – Manuel Collantes, 90, diplomat and Acting Minister of Foreign Affairs in 1984 (born 1918)
- June 2 – Vitaliano Agan, 74, former Mayor of Zamboanga City (born 1935)
- June 12 – Ledivina V. Cariño, 67, sociologist and political scientist (born 1942)
- June 13 – Douglas Quijano, 64, talent manager (born 1944)
- June 25 – Commodore Ramon A. Alcaraz, 93, World War II veteran (born 1915)
- July 2 – Susan Fernandez, singer and activist (born 1956)
- August 1 – Corazon Aquino, 76, former president of the Philippines and first female president (1986–1992), mother of Kris Aquino and former Philippine president Benigno Aquino III (born 1933)
- August 24 – Eduardo V. Roquero, 60, incumbent mayor of San Jose del Monte City (born 1949)
- August 31 – Eraño G. Manalo, 84, Executive Minister of the Iglesia ni Cristo (1963–2009), (b. January 2, 1925)
- September 1 – Alexis Tioseco, 28, Filipino-born Canadian film critic (born 1981)
- September 8 – Rogelio Borja Flores, 74. former sports writer (born 1935)
- September 15 – Espiridion Laxa, 79, incumbent chairman of film academy of the Philippines and film industry leader and pioneering independent film producer (born 1929)
- September 16 – Sotero Laurel II, 90, former politician & Senator 1986–1992 (born 1918)
- October 10 – Rodrigo del Rosario, 92, Filipino Olympic weightlifter. (born 1917)
- October 25 – Billy Bibit, 59, Filipino soldier and coup d'état leader, complications from a stroke. (born 1950)
- November 18 – Amelia Gordon, former mayor of Olongapo City, mother of Senator Richard Gordon (born 1920)
- November 19 – Johnny Delgado, 61, former actor and writer (born 1948)
- November 21 – Bernard Bonnin, 71, former actor (born 1938)
- November 23 – Sonny Trinidad, Filipino comics artist
- December 9 – Eduardo Pacheco, 73, Filipino Sportsman (born 1936)
