= 2012 in the Philippines =

- Decades: 1990s; 2000s; 2010s; 2020s
- See also: List of years in the Philippines; films (highest grossing); television

2012 in the Philippines details events of note that happened in the Philippines in 2012.

== Incumbents ==
Benigno S.
Aquino III

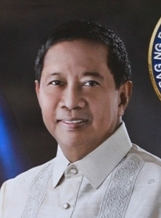
Jejomar C.
Binay Sr.

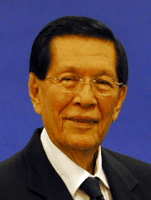
Juan Ponce F. Enrile

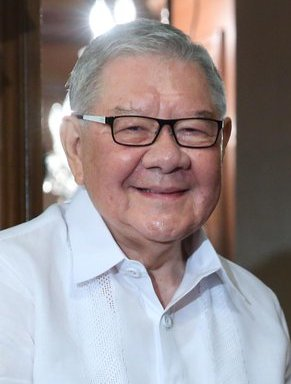
Feliciano R.
Belmonte Jr.

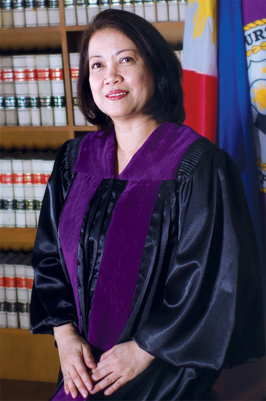
Maria Lourdes
P.A. Sereno

- President: Benigno Aquino III (Liberal)
- Vice President: Jejomar Binay (PDP-Laban)
- Chief Justice:
  - Renato Corona (until May 29)
  - Antonio Carpio (acting) (from May 29 – August 24)
  - Maria Lourdes Sereno (from August 24)
- Philippine Congress: 15th Congress of the Philippines
- Senate President: Juan Ponce Enrile
- House Speaker: Feliciano Belmonte, Jr.

== Events ==
=== January ===
- January 5–7 – A landslide occurs in Compostela Valley, leaving more than 30 people dead, and 50 still missing.
- January 15 – The Moro National Liberation Front (MNLF) declares the independence of Bangsamoro Land (Sulu, Mindanao, Palawan, Sabah) in Valencia, Bukidnon.

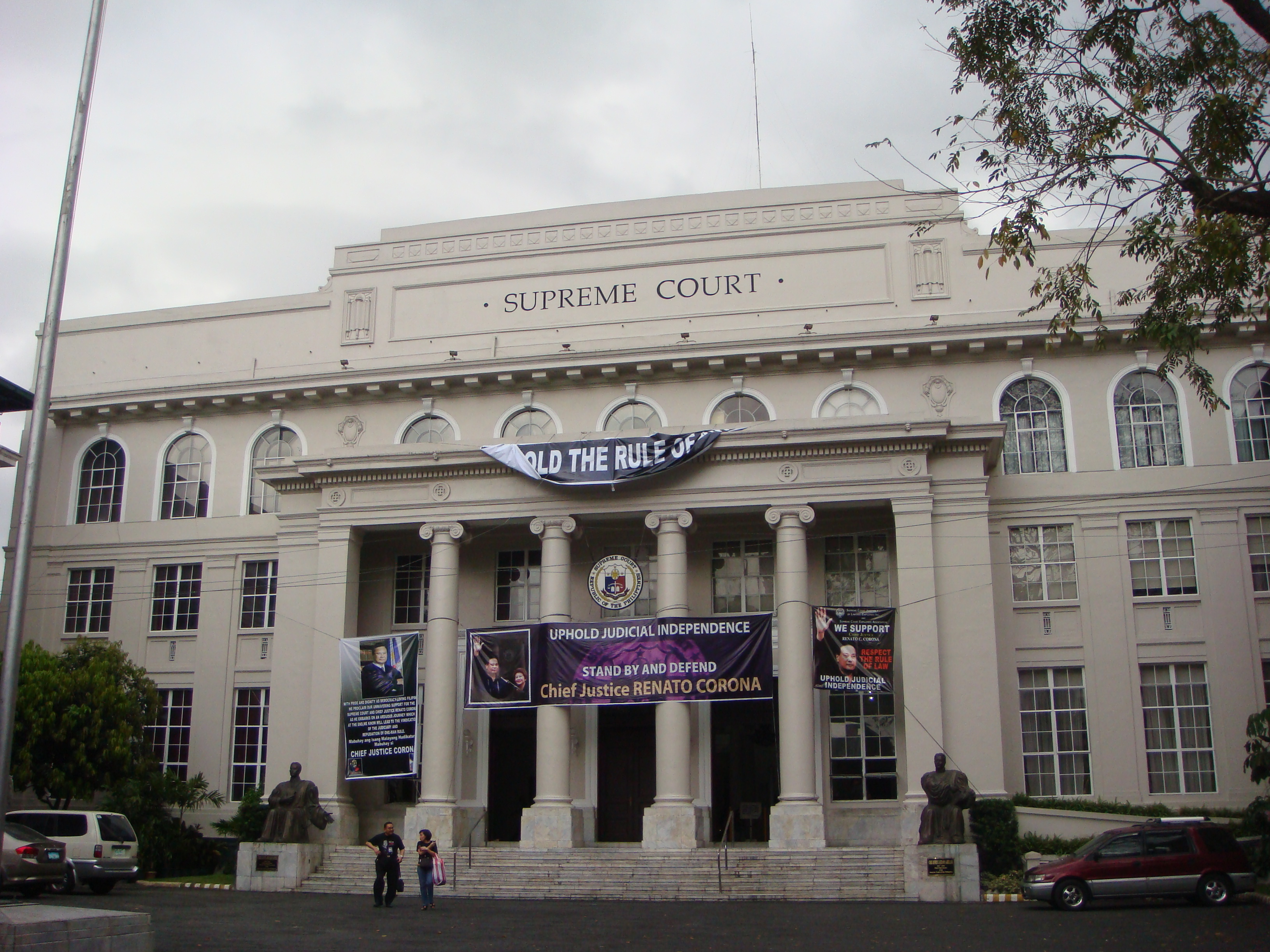
Supreme Court building, with tarpaulins expressing support for Chief Justice Renato Corona.

- January 16 – Impeachment trial of Chief Justice Renato Corona begins.

=== February ===
- February 6 – A 6.9-magnitude earthquake hits the Negros and Cebu provinces, killing at least 52 people. The earthquake causes heavy landslides and huge cracks on highways and violently shakes buildings.

=== April ===
- April 8–10 – The Philippine Navy spots Chinese fishermen fishing on the disputed Scarborough Shoal and attempts to detain them on April 10, but is blocked by the Chinese maritime surveillance ship. This leads to a diplomatic standoff over the shoal and further strains China-Philippine relations.
- April 28 – The United Nations approves the territorial claim of the Philippines to Benham Plateau (known as Benham Rise), a 13-million-hectare undersea landmass off the coast of Aurora Province which is potentially rich in mineral deposits.

=== May ===
- May 29 – Supreme Court Chief Justice Renato Corona is found guilty and convicted with a vote of 20–3 at the conclusion of the Impeachment trial, leading to his removal from office.

=== June ===
- June 6 – The Venus transit of June 6, 2012 is the second and last of two Venus transits of the 21st century. It was witnessed by amateur astronomers and sky watchers throughout the country, following the first transit on June 8, 2004.
- June 23 – Bacoor becomes a component city in the province of Cavite through ratification of Republic Act 10160.

=== July ===
- July 21 – Mabalacat becomes a component city in the province of Pampanga through ratification of Republic Act 10164.
- July 25 – Former President Gloria Macapagal Arroyo is released from hospital arrest on bail.

=== August ===
- From late July into the first week of August, heavy rain brought on by Typhoons Saola and Haikui causes widespread flooding in many parts of the Philippines, which affected 2.4 million people. The capital Manila was the worst-affected. Many people fled their homes, and around 362,000 people sheltered in evacuation centres. As of August 8, the death toll was confirmed to be at least 53, then a few days later, reports confirmed the death toll at 60. As of August 13, confirmed deaths had risen to 89.
- August 4 – Cabuyao becomes a component city in the province of Laguna after ratification of Republic Act 10163.
- August 11 – Ilagan becomes a component city in the province of Isabela after ratification of Republic Act 10169.
- August 18 – A plane carrying four people – two pilots, the Secretary of the Department of the Interior and Local Government Jesse Robredo and his aide, crashes off the shore of Masbate Island en route to Robredo's hometown of Naga City from Cebu City. His aide survived the crash, however the Secretary and the two pilots did not survive.
- August 31 – A 7.6-magnitude earthquake strike off the east of Samar Island, causing tsunami evacuations and power cuts.

=== September ===
- September 12 – The Cybercrime Prevention Act is officially signed into law by President Benigno Aquino III.
- September 28 – Province of Bukidnon is reapportioned into four legislative districts by virtue of Republic Act No. 10184 signed by President Benigno Aquino III on the same date.

=== October ===
- October 15 – The Philippine government signs a document touted as the Framework Agreement on the Bangsamoro, which culminates the Aquino Administration's effort to end the deadlock in the peace process. This new document, while merely providing for a general framework for the actual peace negotiations, announces that "the status quo is unacceptable and that the Bangsamoro shall be established to replace the Autonomous Region in Muslim Mindanao (ARMM). The Bangsamoro is the new autonomous political entity (NPE) referred to in the Decision Points of Principles as of April 2012." According to President Aquino, this was the agreement that "can finally seal genuine, lasting peace in Mindanao." with Bangsamoro replacing ARMM which was described by President Benigno Aquino III as "a failed experiment".

=== December ===
Animated enhanced infrared satellite loop of Typhoon Bopha from peak intensity to landfall in the Philippines

- December 4 – Typhoon Bopha (Pablo) causes widespread destruction on the island of Mindanao, leaving thousands of people homeless. The cyclone is said to be one of the deadliest storms ever to hit the Philippines in decades. As of December 9, the death toll had climbed to 540, with 827 people still missing.
- December 21 – The controversial Reproductive Health Bill is signed into law by President Benigno Aquino III.

== Holidays ==
On December 11, 2009, Republic Act No. 9849 declared Eidul Adha as a regular holiday. Also amending Executive Order No. 292, also known as The Administrative Code of 1987, the following are regular and special days shall be observed. The EDSA Revolution Anniversary was proclaimed since 2002 as a special nonworking holiday. On February 25, 2004, Republic Act No. 9256 declared every August 21 as a special nonworking holiday to be known as Ninoy Aquino Day. Note that in the list, holidays in bold are "regular holidays" and those in italics are "nationwide special days".

- January 1 – **New Year's Day**
- February 25 – EDSA Revolution Anniversary
- April 5 – **Maundy Thursday**
- April 6 – **Good Friday**
- April 9 – **Araw ng Kagitingan** (Day of Valor)
- May 1 – **Labor Day**
- June 12 – **Independence Day**
- August 18 – **Eidul Fitr**
- August 21 – Ninoy Aquino Day
- August 26 – **National Heroes Day**
- October 25 – **Eidul Adha**
- November 1 – All Saints Day
- November 30 – **Bonifacio Day**
- December 25 – **Christmas Day**
- December 30 – **Rizal Day**
- December 31 – Last Day of the Year

In addition, several other places observe local holidays, such as the foundation of their town. These are also "special days."

== Entertainment and Culture ==
- October 21 – Pedro Calungsod is canonized in the Vatican City. He is the second Filipino saint.
- December – La Luna Roja, the first full-length flamenco ballet is performed on a Philippine stage.
- December 21 – Philippine Representative Janine Tugonon Placed 1st Runner-up, at the Miss Universe 2012 Pageant held in Las Vegas, US.

== Concerts ==
- January 12 – Simple Plan Get Your Heart On! Tour live at the Smart Araneta Coliseum
- January 17 – The Ventures Guitar Mania live at the CCP Main Theatre
- January 18 – AJ Rafael Red Roses Asia Tour live at the Music Museum
- January 22 – Katy Perry The California Dreams Tour live at the SM Mall of Asia Concert Grounds
- January 27 – Rap-Rockan Rockoverload 2 live at the Metro Bar 47 West Avenue Quezon City
- January 28 – Anne Curtis Annebisyosa Concert live at the Smart Araneta Coliseum
- February 9 – Channel V Music Festival 2012 live at the Metrowalk Parking Lot, Metrowalk Complex
- February 12 – Engelbert Humperdinck live at the Waterfront Hotel Cebu
- February 14:
  - Engelbert Humperdinck live at The Manila Hotel
  - Ogie Alcasid and Regine Velasquez: Mr. & Mrs A live at the Smart Araneta Coliseum
- February 15 – Engelbert Humperdinck live at the Smart Araneta Coliseum
- February 16 – Avril Lavigne The Black Star Tour live at the Smart Araneta Coliseum
- February 17 – James Ingram live at the Smart Araneta Coliseum
- February 18 – James Ingram live at the Waterfront Hotel, Cebu City
- February 19 – Evanescence and Bush live at the Smart Araneta Coliseum
- February 20 – Citipointe: Hope Is Erupting Tour live at the Philsports Arena
- February 25 – A1, Blue, and Jeff Timmons The Greatest Hits Tour live at the Smart Araneta Coliseum
- March 2 – Jose and Wally A Party For Every Juan live at the Smart Araneta Coliseum
- March 5 – Death Cab For Cutie live at the NBC Tent
- March 8 – Smash Project: Cobra Starship, The Used, The Cab and Dashboard Confessional live at the Smart Araneta Coliseum
- March 9 – Charice Infinity Tour live at the Smart Araneta Coliseum
- March 11 – Charice Infinity Tour live at the Waterfront Hotel, Cebu City
- March 12 – OMD History of Modern live at the Smart Araneta Coliseum
- March 16 – A Day To Remember live at the Ynares Sports Arena
- March 17:
  - Brian Mcknight live at the Waterfront Cebu City Hotel
  - Cyndi Lauper live at the Smart Araneta Coliseum
- March 23 – 100 Years of Coca-Cola Concert ng Bayan live at the SM Mall of Asia Concert Grounds
- March 28 – The Platters live at the Aliw Theater
- March 30 – Hanson: Shout It Out Tour live at the Smart Araneta Coliseum
- March 31:
  - Hanson: Shout It Out Tour live at the Waterfront Hotel, Cebu City
  - Olivia Newton-John live at the Smart Araneta Coliseum
- April 10 – The Cranberries live at the Smart Araneta Coliseum
- April 11 – LMFAO live at the Smart Araneta Coliseum
- April 12 – The Stylistics live at the Smart Araneta Coliseum
- April 13 – Taking Back Sunday live at the SM Skydome
- April 22 – Greyson Chance live at the Smart Araneta Coliseum
- April 24 – Sergio Mendez live at the Smart Araneta Coliseum
- May 1 – Secondhand Serenade live at the SM Skydome
- May 13 – Morrissey live at the World Trade Center
- May 21 & 22 – Lady Gaga The Born This Way Ball Tour live at the Mall of Asia Arena
- May 26 – Lifehouse live at the Smart Araneta Coliseum
- May 28 – We The Kings live at the Hard Rock Cafe
- June 3 – NKOTBSB New Kids on the Block Backstreet Boys live at the Mall of Asia Arena
- June 7 – Michelle Branch and Jojo live at the Smart Araneta Coliseum
- June 12 – Malayang Pilipino Independence Day Concert live at the Quirino Grandstand
- June 16 – Original Pilipino Music Artists ICONS at the Arena live at the Mall of Asia Arena
- June 21 – The Fray live at the Mall of Asia Arena
- July 7 – Sarah Geronimo 24/SG: The Birthday Concert live at the Smart Araneta Coliseum
- July 11:
  - Nicki Minaj The Pink Friday Tour live at the Mall of Asia Arena
  - Silverstein live at the Area 05 Superclub, Bellasio Square, Toas Morato, Quezon City
- July 14 – David Cook live at the Smart Araneta Coliseum
- July 15 – David Cook live at the Waterfront Hotel Cebu City
- August 3 – Nina Unleashed live at the Metro Bar 47 West Avenue Quezon City
- August 8 – The Smashing Pumpkins live at the Smart Araneta Coliseum
- August 9:
  - Cirque Du Soleil live at the Mall of Asia Arena
  - Snow Patrol: Fallen Empires Tour live at the Smart Araneta Coliseum
- August 10 – Tears for Fears live at the Smart Araneta Coliseum
- August 16 – Nelly Furtado & Gym Class Heroes live at the Smart Araneta Coliseum
- August 18 – Anne Curtis Annebisyosa No Other Concert World Tour live at the University of Southeastern Philippines Gym, Davao City
- September 14 – The Wanted live at the NBC Tent, Fort Bonifacio, Taguig
- September 18:
  - Maroon 5 Live at the Smart Araneta Coliseum
  - Dolphy Alay Tawa: A Musical Tribute to the King of Philippine Comedy live at the Mall of Asia Arena
- September 21 – American Idol Live Tour at the Smart Araneta Coliseum
- September 26 – The Killers live at the Smart Araneta Coliseum
- September 28 – Aiza Seguerra Bente Singko The Anniversary Concert live at the Smart Araneta Coliseum
- October 2 – Keane Strangeland Tour live at the Mall of Asia Arena
- October 9 – James Morrison The Awakening World Tour live at the Smart Araneta Coliseum
- October 10 – David Guetta live at the Mall of Asia Arena
- October 12 – Wilson Phillips live at the Mall of Asia Arena
- October 17 – America with Kalapana live at the Smart Araneta Coliseum
- October 19:
  - America with Kalapana live at the Waterfront Hotel
  - Jonas Brothers live at the Mall of Asia Arena
- October 21:
  - America with Kalapana live at the University of Baguio
  - Kamikazee live at the Robinsons Place Lipa
- October 24: Big Bang Alive Galaxy Tour live at the Mall of Asia Arena
- October 26:
  - Rachelle Ann Go Rise Against Gravity live at the Music Museum
  - Tanduay Rhum Rock Fest Year 6 live at the SM Mall of Asia Concert Grounds
- November 8: Don Moen live at the Smart Araneta Coliseum
- November 9: Don Moen live at the Bohol Wisdom School Gym Tagbiliran
- November 11: Don Moen live at the FSUU Gym Butuan
- November 16: Regine Velasquez Silver The 25th Anniversary Concert live at the Mall of Asia Arena
- November 26: Jennifer Lopez Dance Again World Tour live at the Mall of Asia Arena
- November 30: Ako Naman!!! Ate Gay sa Arena live at the Mall of Asia Arena
- December 9: Sting Back to Bass Tour live at the Mall of Asia Arena
- December 17: Ely Buendia The Greatest Hits live at the SBCA Gymnasium
- December 18: Pinoy Music Fest '12 live at the Smart Araneta Coliseum

== Sports ==
- January 29 – Basketball: The Talk 'N Text Tropang Texters win the 2011–12 PBA Philippine Cup, its fifth PBA championship.
- March 19 – Football: The Philippine Football Team placed third in 2012 AFC Challenge Cup in Nepal.
- May 6 – Basketball: The B-Meg Llamados wins defeating the Talk 'N Text Tropang Texters 84–90 in overtime to win the 2012 PBA Commissioner's Cup finals.
- June 10 – Boxing: Manny Pacquiao lost his WBO Welterweight Championship belt to Timothy Bradley.
- June 23 – Motorsport: Filipino-Swiss Marlon Stöckinger won the second race of the 2012 Monaco GP3 Series, becoming the first Filipino to win a formula race in Europe;
- July 27–August 12 – Multi-Sport Event: – The Philippine team participated in the 2012 Summer Olympics in London, United Kingdom. The 11-man team brought home no medals.
- August 5 – Basketball: The Rain or Shine Elasto Painters wins defeating the B-Meg Llamados 83–76 to win the 2012 PBA Governors' Cup finals.
- August 26 – Basketball: The Philippines men's national basketball team won the championship in the 2012 William Jones Cup for the fourth time.
- August 29–September 9 – Multi Sport Event: The Philippines competed at the 2012 Summer Paralympics in London, England from August 29 to September 9, 2012. The nation had competed as of fifth participation attainment of the games. Philippine Sports Association for the Differently Abled-NPC Philippines fielded 9 athletes to compete in four sports. The 2012 Philippine Paralympic team was the biggest Philippine delegation since the 1988 Paralympics in Seoul, South Korea. Although no medals were won by the 9 athletes, Josephine Medina's performance in table tennis was the best finish for the Philippines, having ranked 4th overall in Paralympic Table Tennis standings.
- September 14–22 – Basketball: The Philippine Basketball Team participated in the 2012 FIBA Asia Cup, held at Ōta, Tokyo, Japan. The team made impressive performance, winning 3 games and losing 1, one in the preliminary round
- September 22 – Cheerleading: The UP Pep Squad won the UAAP Cheerdance Competition. FEU Cheering Squad placed second, while the NU Pep Squad placed third.
- September 25–29 – Football: The Philippines hosted the 2012 Philippine Peace Cup in Manila. The Philippines won first place in the tournament
- October 11 – Basketball: The Ateneo Blue Eagles wins series 2-0 has beaten the UST Growling Tigers, 65–62, to win their fifth straight in UAAP championships.
- October 26 – Basketball: The San Beda Red Lions wins series 2-1 has beaten the Letran Knights, 67–39, to win their third straight in NCAA championships.
- December 8 – Boxing: Manny Pacquiao lost his fourth fight with Juan Manuel Marquez in the sixth round via knockout.
- December 15 – Boxing: Nonito Donaire successfully retained the WBO and The Ring super bantamweight titles against the Mexican Legend Jorge Arce via third round knock out 2:59 into the round. Donaire floored Arce once in the second round, and once in the third round, before the knockout that ended the match.

== Births ==
- February 1 – Athena Calica, wushu practitioner, daughter of 2001 Southeast Asian Games winner Jerome Calica and contestant in It's Showtime's Mini Miss U
- August 22 – Sebastian Benedict, actor
- October 17 – Baylee van den Berg, half-South African model and actress
- November 1 – Khevynne Arias, actress
- November 27 – Raphael Landicho, actor

== Deaths ==
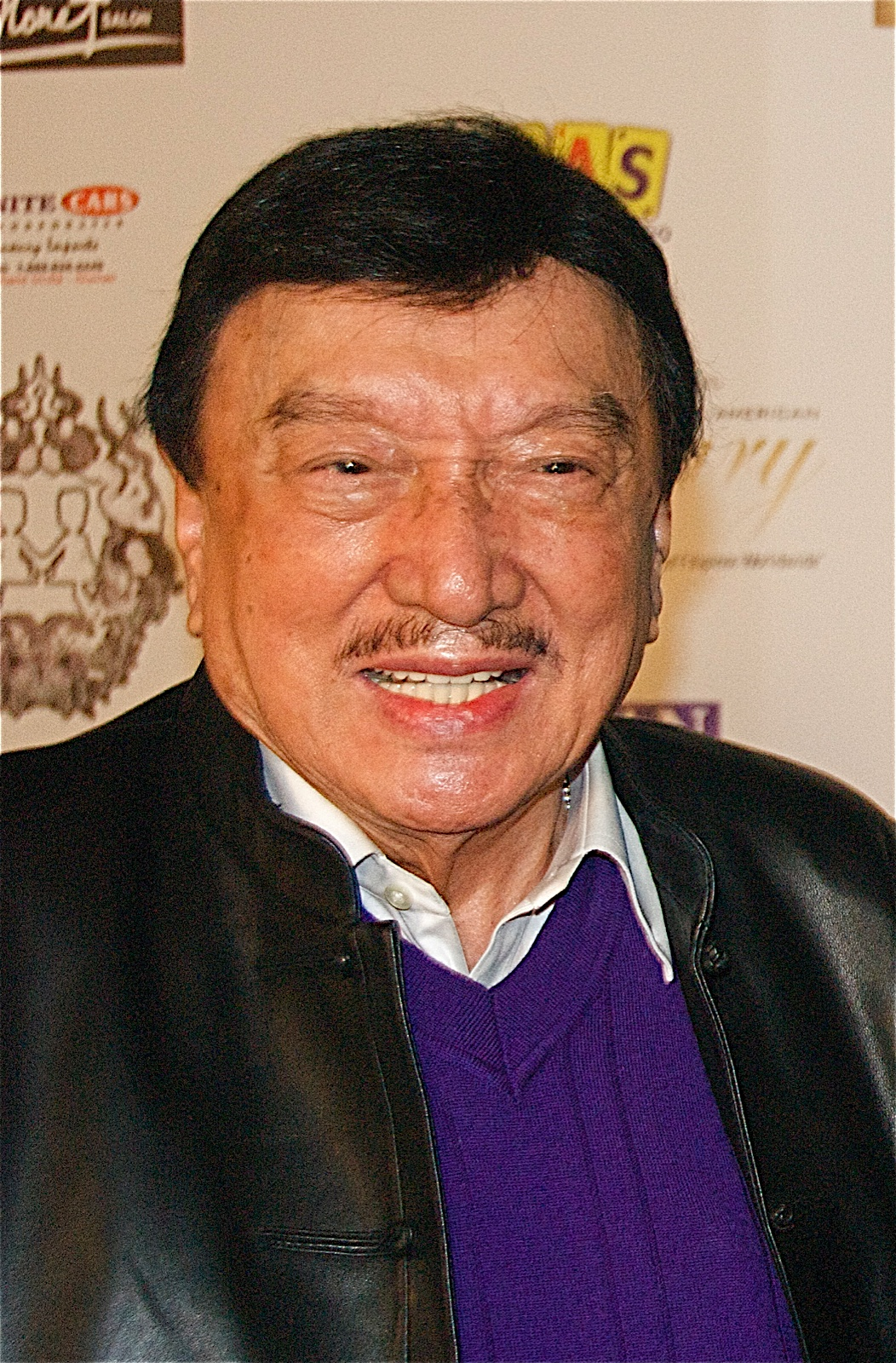
Dolphy

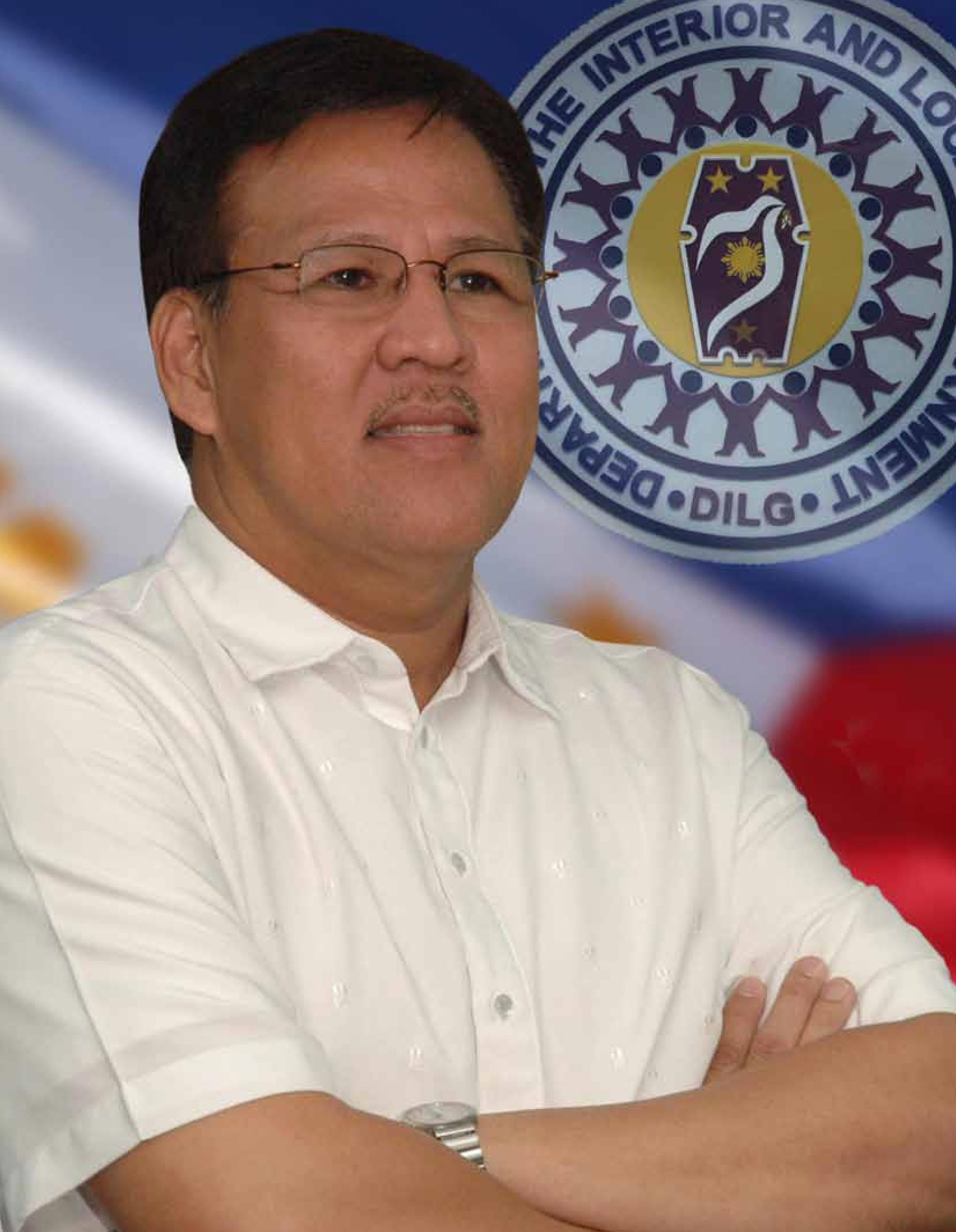
Jesse Robredo
- January 5 – Christopher Guarin, Filipino journalist, gunshot wound. (born 1970)
- January 9 – Salvador A. Rodolfo, Sr., Filipino war hero, leukemia. (born 1919)
- January 26 – Iggy Arroyo, former Congressman of Negros Occidental and younger brother of former First Gentleman Mike Arroyo, liver cirrhosis (born 1951)
- February 3 – Karlo Maquinto, former flyweight division, comatose/blot clot (born 1990)
- February 4 – Soledad Duterte, Filipina teacher and activist, mother of the 16th President of the Philippines, Rodrigo Duterte (born 1916)
- February 9 – Sony Music Philippines, Philippine record label, piracy. (established 1995, resumed in 2018)
- February 18 – Linda Estrella, Filipina movie star from Sampaguita Pictures (born 1922)
- February 29 – Horacio Morales, Secretary of Agrarian Reform from 1998 to 2001, heart attack (born 1943)
- March 2 – Isagani Yambot, veteran Philippine newsman and publisher of Philippine Daily Inquirer, heart attack (born 1934)
- March 9 – Jose Tomas Sanchez, Roman Catholic Prefect Emeritus of the Congregation for the Clergy and Cardinal Priest from the Philippines, multiple organ failure (born 1920)
- March 11 – Azucena Grajo Uranza, Filipino novelist, short story writer, and playwright in the English language. (born 1929)
- March 13:
  - Karl Roy, singer (Kapatid, P.O.T.), cardiac arrest (born 1968)
  - Bodjie Dasig, singer, cancer (born 1964)
- March 15 – Luis Gonzales, Filipino movie star from Sampaguita Pictures, pneumonia (born 1928)
- April 5 – Angelo Castro, Jr., former ABS-CBN anchor/journalist and father of UNTV anchor Diego Castro III, cancer (born 1945)
- May 11:
  - Alma Bella, Filipino actress.(born 1910)
  - Tony DeZuniga, Filipino comic book artist and co-creator of Jonah Hex and Black Orchid, complications from stroke. (born 1932)
- May 15 – Edgardo M. Reyes, Filipino novelist and writers. (born 1936)
- June 26 – Mario O'Hara, award-winning director, leukemia (born 1944)
- June 29 – Perla Dizon Santos-Ocampo, Filipino scientist and pediatrician (born 1931)
- July 10 – Dolphy, actor and comedian dubbed the "King of Comedy", chronic obstructive pulmonary disease and multiple organ failure (born July 25, 1928)
- July 13 – Maita Gomez, Filipina beauty queen and activist, Miss Philippines–World (1967), heart attack (born 1947)
- August 18 – Jesse Robredo, Department of the Interior and Local Government secretary, plane crash (born 1958)
- September 3 – Tito Oreta, Malabon Mayor (born 1938)
- September 23 – Darwin Ramos, servant of god (born 1994)
- October 8 – Marilou Diaz-Abaya, multi-awarded film director, breast cancer (born 1955)
- November 14 – Enrique Beech, Olympic sport shooter.(born 1920)
- November 20 – Pedro Bantigue y Natividad, Filipino Roman Catholic prelate, Bishop of San Pablo (1967–1995), internal bleeding (born 1920)
- November 26 – Celso Advento Castillo, Filipino director and actor, cardiac arrest (born 1943)
- December 23 – Jerusalino Araos, Filipino sculptor, heart attack.(born 1944)
- December 24 – Carolina Griño-Aquino, Filipino judge, Supreme Court (1988–1993) and Court of Appeals.(born 1923)
- December 25 – Erico Aumentado, Filipino politician, member of the House of Representatives for Bohol (since 2010), pneumonia.(born 1940)
- December 31 – James B. Reuter, American academician in the Philippines, theater writer, director and producer (born 1916)
