= C/S =

Defunct Filipino television network

- Type: Commercial television network
- Country: Philippines
- Availability: Defunct
- Owner: Solar Entertainment Corporation (STVNI/Nine Media)
- Key people: Wilson Tieng (President); William Tieng (Chairman); Willy Y. Tieng (Vice-chairman)
- Launch date: October 15, 2005
- Dissolved: November 28, 2009
- Former names: Solar Entertainment Television (2000-2002); Solar USA (2002-2004); USA (2004-2005)
- Picture format: NTSC 480i (SDTV)
- Affiliation: Radio Philippines Network (2008–2009)
- Language: English
- Replaced by: CHASE; Solar TV (RPN channel space)

C/S (standing for Crime/Suspense, originally used as an on-air brand) was used for several Filipino entertainment channels owned by Solar Entertainment Corporation and jointly operated with Nine Media Corporation (formerly Solar Television Network). It showed mostly American crime and suspense dramas, mysteries, reality, science fiction and action shows.

== History ==
Solar Entertainment first launched its namesake entertainment cable channel in the early 2000s, which was devoted to American programs. This channel was later known as Solar USA (the acronym stands for "Ultimate in Suspense and Action"), and later simply as USA. USA was replaced by two separate channels in 2005. Solar USA's comedy and general entertainment programming was moved to Jack TV, while action and crime dramas were given a new separate channel, Crime/Suspense, launched in October of that year.

As part of a partnership established with the Radio Philippines Network, C/S became the on-air brand for its network of over-the-air stations across the Philippines on January 1, 2008. The C/S cable channel was later rebranded as C/S Origin in September of the same year, while the RPN network later changed its branding to C/S 9 the next month, and then changed its name to Solar TV on November 29, 2009.

On December 24, 2011, CHASE was launched. This is the revival TV network of C/S because of its similar format. On October 20, 2012, it was rebranded as Jack City, carrying the same format. On March 22, 2015, Jack City was rebranded as CT (now defunct).

== Programs ==
=== Procedural drama ===
- Bones
- Burn Notice
- The Closer
- Cold Case
- The Dresden Files
- Eleventh Hour
- Fringe
- In Plain Sight
- K-Ville
- The Kill Point
- Law & Order
- Law and Order: Criminal Intent
- Law and Order: Special Victims Unit
- Life
- Medium
- The Mentalist
- NCIS
- Oz
- Saving Grace
- Shark
- The Sopranos
- Without a Trace

=== Comedy series ===
- Chuck
- Psych

=== Reality ===
- Survivor: Samoa
- To Catch a Predator

=== Documentary/factuals ===
- 7 Deadly Hollywood Sins
- Body of Evidence
- City Confidential
- Cold Case Files
- Crime and Punishment
- Crime Scene Academy
- Crime Seen
- Crime Stories
- Dominick Dunne: Power, Privilege, & Justice
- Extreme Evidence
- Final Justice with Erin Brockovich
- The First 48
- Forensic Files
- Hollywood Justice
- I Detective
- Investigative Reports
- L.A. Detectives
- Masterminds
- North Mission Road
- Psychic Detectives
- The Takedown
- What Should You Do?

=== News, talk and infotainment ===
- Boses
- Dial-M
- Ikaw at Ang Batas
- Late Show with David Letterman
- Malacanang Press Conference
- NBC Nightly News
- One Morning Cafe
- RPN iWatch News
- RPN NewsCap
- RPN NewsWatch
- RPN NewsWatch Aksyon Balita
- RPN NewsWatch Junior Edition
- RPN NewsWatch Update
- RPN News Update
- Sagip Bayan
- The Working President

=== Movie blocks ===
- C/S Movie Mania

=== Sports ===
- American Gladiators
- Beijing Olympics on C/S Sports
- NBA
- PBA on C/S9
- UAAP on C/S9
- NCAA on C/S9
- The Main Events
- WWE on C/S Sports
  - WWE ECW
  - WWE Pay-Per-View Special
  - WWE Raw
  - WWE SmackDown

=== From C/S 9 and C/S Origin ===
- Battlestar Galactica (2004)
- Bionic Woman
- Combat Missions
- Conviction
- Crossing Jordan
- E-Ring
- Eureka
- Firefly
- The Grid
- Heroes
- Hunter (2003)
- Invasion
- Jericho
- Kojak
- Law & Order: Trial by Jury
- The Law Firm
- Moonlight
- Murder, She Wrote
- Profiler
- Revelations
- Standoff
- Surface
- Survivor: China
- Survivor: Fiji
- Survivor: Gabon (*)
- Survivor: Tocantins (*)
- Terminator: The Sarah Connor Chronicles
- Thief
- Threshold
- Traffic
- Treasure Hunters
- Women's Murder Club
- The X-Files

(*) - The Survivor franchise originally aired on Studio 23 (laterly S+A now defunct) before its move to C/S. However, when GMA acquired the rights to air the Philippines' version of Survivor, sister station Q (laterly GMA News TV, now GTV seen on UHF 27/A2Z seen on VHF 11) also acquired the rights to air the next Survivor TV series. Survivor: Gabon was first shown on September 26, 2008, while Survivor: Tocantins was shown on February 14, 2009, on C/S Origin. The franchise moved back entirely to Solar with the showing of Survivor: Samoa on C/S 9.
