= Word of mouth (disambiguation) =

Word of mouth is a method of communication.

Word of Mouth may also refer to:

- Word of Mouth (TV series), a TV show hosted by Sandy Daza and Teacher Patty in the Philippines
- Word of Mouth (DVD), a stand-up DVD by Doug Stanhope
- Word of Mouth (radio programme), a BBC Radio 4 programme presented by Michael Rosen
- Word of Mouth (journal), a peer-reviewed academic journal in the field of education

In music:

- Word of Mouth (Toni Basil album), 1982
- Word of Mouth (The Blueskins album), 2004
- Word of Mouth (Matt Finish album), 1984
- Word of Mouth (Vin Garbutt album), 1999
- Word of Mouth (The Kinks album), 1984
  - "Word of Mouth" (The Kinks song), 1984
- Word of Mouth (Mike + The Mechanics album), 1991
  - "Word of Mouth" (Mike + The Mechanics song), 1991
- Word of Mouth (Jaco Pastorius album), 1981
- Word of Mouth (John Reuben album), 2007
- Word of Mouth (Vicious Rumors album), 1994
- Word of Mouth (The Wanted album), 2013
- Word of Mouth, a 1992 album by Cowboy Mouth

== See also ==
- Word-of-mouth marketing (aka WOMM), a method of marketing that deliberately employs word of mouth
- Word of Mouf, a 2001 album by Ludacris
