= Alex Magno =

Alex Magno may refer to:

- Alex Magno (political scientist), political scientist and academic in the Philippines
- Alex Magno (choreographer), Brazilian-born choreographer and director
