= Jerry Araos =

Jerusalino “Jerry” V. Araos (1944-2012) was a Filipino sculptor, landscape artist, and activist best known for using discarded wood and felled trees in his sculptures, and for his prominent role in the resistance against the dictatorship of Ferdinand Marcos. In 2018, Araos was identified by the Human Rights Victims' Claims Board as a Motu Proprio human rights violations victim of the Martial Law Era.

Araos is also known for having popularized the term "Bansoy" - a portmanteau of "bansot na halamang makahoy" (short woody plant) - in reference to Philippine interpretations of Bonsai art.
