= Karlo Maquinto =

Filipino boxer

Personal information
- Nickname: Nonoy
- Nationality: (Philippines) Filipino
- Born: Karlo P. Maquinto; July 8, 1990 Lambunao, Iloilo, Philippines
- Died: February 3, 2012 (aged 21) FEU-Nicanor Reyes Hospital, Quezon City
- Weight: Flyweight

Boxing career
- Stance: Orthodox

Boxing record
- Total fights: 9
- Wins: 8
- Win by KO: 6
- Losses: 0
- Draws: 1
- No contests: 0

Karlo P. Maquinto (8 July 1990 – 3 February 2012) was a super flyweight Filipino boxer who resided in Baguio, Benguet, Philippines. He died after he collapsed at the end of his 7th professional bout.

== Early life ==
Maquinto was born in Lambunao, Iloilo, the fifth of six children of Felicibar Jr. and Marjorie Maquinto. He completed his elementary education, but left high school to pursue his boxing career.

== Boxing career ==
- 19 January 2011: Win against Andro Oliveros by KO in round 2 of a 4-round bout
- 11 February 2011: Win against Jhune Cambel by KO in round 3 of a 4-round bout
- 7 April 2011: Win against Jhune Kambel by KO in round 2 of a 4-round bout
- 28 May 2011: Win against Jomar Yema by KO in round 3 of a 4-round bout
- 17 August 2011: Win against Edwin Mondala by points, after a 4-round bout
- 30 October 2011: Win against Gerald Cortes by points after a 6-round bout
- 26 November 2011: Win against Zoren Pama by KO in round 3 of a 6-round bout
- 11 December 2011: Win against Argie Toquero by KO in round 5 of 6-round bout
- 28 January 2012: Draw with Mark Joseph Costa after an 8-round bout

== Death ==
He collapsed after the end of an 8-round bout with Marc Joseph Costa in Caloocan, Philippines. The match had ended with a majority draw, the sole blemish on an earlier perfect 8–0–0 record with 6 KOs.

Maquinto was rushed to FEU Hospital in Quezon City. He was diagnosed with subdural hematoma (bleeding on the brain). Tests showed that a blood clot had developed in his brain as a result of blows received in the first round of the fight. Maquinto went into a coma; he died five days later in the hospital.
