= Susan Fernandez =

Filipina singer (1956–2009)

Susan Fernandez-Magno
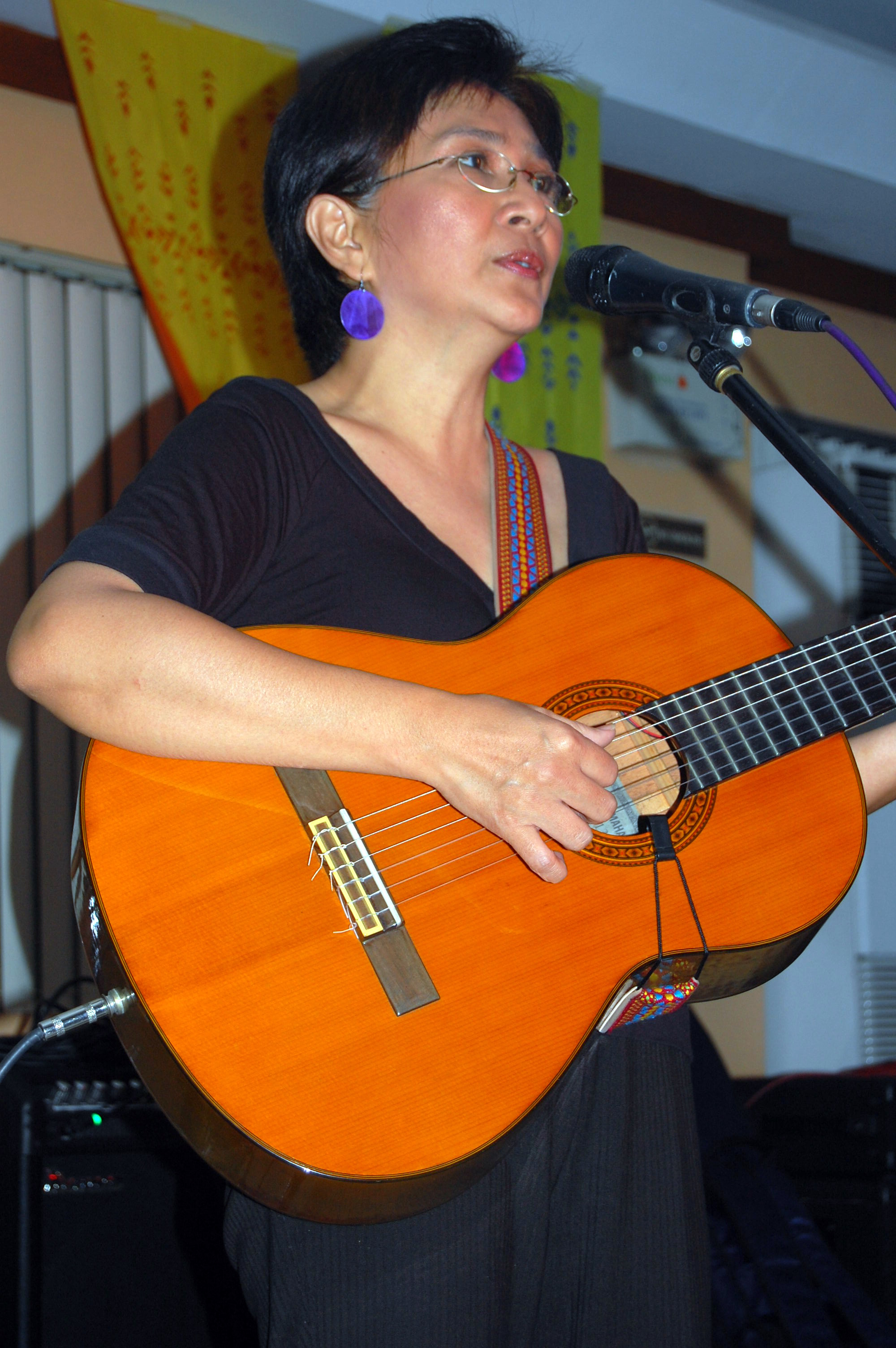
- Susan Fernandez in 2007

Background information
- Born: Susan Fernandez; August 3, 1956; Manila, Philippines
- Died: July 2, 2009 (aged 52) Pasig, Metro Manila, Philippines
- Genres: Folk; Rock; OPM; Jazz
- Occupation: SingerSongwriter
- Instrument: Guitar
- Years active: 1976–2009

Susan Fernandez Magno (August 3, 1956 – July 2, 2009) was a Filipina singer, activist and academic. She was known for her protest music, especially at the height of the authoritarian regime of Ferdinand Marcos.

== Biography ==
An alumna of the University of the Philippines, where she earned a degree in A.B. Sociology and Master of Arts in Philippine Studies, Susan Fernandez (later known as Susan Magno or Susan Fernandez Magno) first gained prominence as a performer during anti-Marcos rallies in the first half of the 1980s. She would come to be hailed as "the voice of a protest generation". She also became known for her rendition of the feminist anthem Babae Ka, which was released as a track in her 1990 album Habi at Himig.

For eleven years, Susan Fernandez Magno hosted the television variety program Concert at the Park. In the 1990s, Fernandez co-presented the children's show, Bulilit, alongside Bodjie Pascua. In 2008, Susan Fernandez Magno was featured, along with other Filipino celebrities such as Ely Buendia, Chris Tiu and Angel Locsin, in the Ako Mismo television advertising campaign.

=== Death ===
Fernandez was diagnosed with ovarian cancer in 2008. Despite her illness, she continued to teach at the Ateneo de Manila University and perform at nightly gigs. She died at Pasig on July 2, 2009, aged 52. A friend of hers was performing her favorite song, Both Sides Now, at the moment of her death.

== Educator ==
She taught at the Ateneo de Manila University, St. Scholastica's College and the University of the Philippines, where she earned her master's degree.

== Family ==
Susan Fernandez was married to Philippine Star columnist Alex Magno, with whom she had two sons, Kalayaan and Sandino Magno.
