= C/S Origin =

Defunct television channel in the Philippines

- Country: Philippines
- Broadcast area: Defunct

Ownership
- Owner: Solar Entertainment Corporation
- Sister channels: ETC; 2nd Avenue; C/S 9 Jack TV; Solar Sports; Basketball TV

History
- Launched: September 14, 2008; 17 years ago
- Replaced: Sci Fi Channel
- Closed: July 15, 2009; 16 years ago

C/S Origin was an entertainment channel that was owned by Solar Entertainment Corporation, a Filipino media company based in Makati, Philippines. The flagship channel of C/S 9 (on free TV owned by RPN). It mostly broadcast American crime and suspense dramas, science-fiction, mysteries, reality and investigation shows. The initial broadcast was launched on September 14, 2008. This channel was available on Global Destiny Cable and SkyCable.

Solar Entertainment had decided "handover" all programs shown on C/S Origin back to its terrestrial channel, C/S 9, on July 15, 2009. C/S Origin, which was available on Global Destiny Cable and SkyCable, has then been replaced by Sci Fi Channel (then Universal Channel) on their respective channel line-up.

== Profile ==
C/S (better known as Crime/Suspense), the home of the world's critically acclaimed and award-winning US television series, takes entertainment to the next level with C/S Origin. The channel that gives you an unparalleled selection of choice programming from the hottest shows to the latest seasons. To the most investigative factuals and blockbuster movies.
