= Word of Mouth (journal) =

- Discipline: Counseling
- Language: English
- Edited by: Carol Westby

Publication details
- History: 1989–present
- Publisher: SAGE Publications
- Frequency: 5/year

Standard abbreviations
- ISO 4: Word Mouth

Indexing
- ISSN: 1048-3950 (print); 2154-3941 (web)
- LCCN: sn90002957
- OCLC no.: 300275397

Links
- Journal homepage; Online access; Online archive

Word of Mouth is a peer-reviewed academic journal that publishes papers five times a year in the field of education. The editor-in-chief is Carol Westby (University of New Mexico). The journal was established in 1989 and is currently published by SAGE Publications in association with The Hammill Institute on Disabilities.

== Abstracting and indexing ==
Word of Mouth is abstracted and indexed in CINAHL and Scopus.
