= Rogelio Borja Flores =

20th and early 21st century Filipino sports writer

Rogelio Borja Flores (1935 – September 8, 2009) was a Filipino sports writer.

Flores went to the University of Santo Tomas to study philosophy and letters but failed to complete the course, he turned to sports writing shortly after leaving university.

When working for the Times Journal for which he covered events such as the Thrilla in Manila boxing match between Muhammad Ali and Joe Frazier, the 1977 World Chess Championships and World Amateur Golf at Wack Wack in 1977.

As well as working for the Times Journal, Flores also worked for the Evening News, Philippine Sun, The Tribune, Philippine Post and the Manila Times. His last job was as a golf sportswriter and columnist for the Manila Standard-Today.

Flores died on 8 September 2009 in California due to lung failure.
