= La Luna Roja =

Ballet

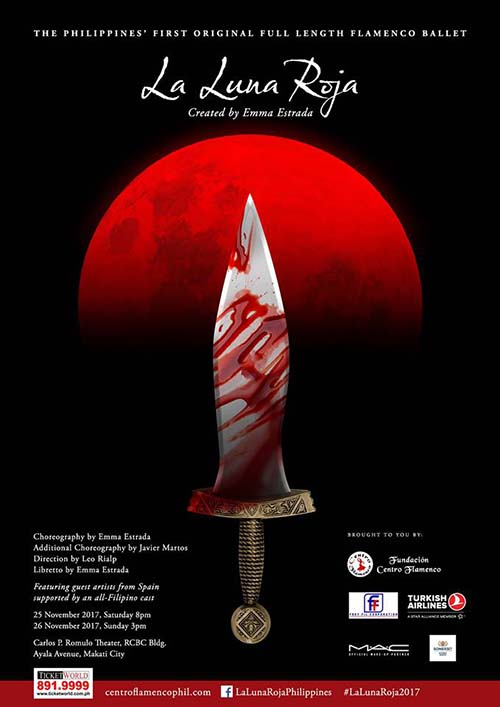
- La Luna Roja Poster, 2017
- Location: Philippines
- Started: December 2012
- Most recent: November 2019
- Directors: Leo Rialp
- Writers: Emma Estrada
- Artistic director: Emma Estrada
- Type of play: Flamenco Ballet
- Website: centroflamencophil.com

La Luna Roja is the first full length flamenco ballet ever performed on the Philippine stage. An offering by the Philippine flamenco foundation, Fundacion Centro Flamenco, the ballet is an original work created by Emma Estrada based on a story written by her. Estrada describes writing the tale with an eye towards creating a flamenco ballet, labelling La Luna Roja as flamenco's twist on the traditional ballet. While ballets such as The Sleeping Beauty (ballet) are traditionally mediums of telling a story, Flamenco is more often performed without a specific story. La Luna Roja blends the concept of flamenco and ballet together. La Luna Roja is directed by Leo Rialp, the lauded movie and stage director and choreographed by Estrada, as its artistic director. The 2017 staging of the ballet also included choreography by acclaimed flamenco artist Javier Martos. The ballet has been described as a "dark fairytale... told through the passionate and fiery art form that is flamenco."

== Synopsis ==
La Luna Roja is a flamenco ballet presented in two acts. It tells the story of a feared Sorceress who placed a curse on the village for their role in her son's suicide and how love and sacrifice redeem the village.

=== Act 1 ===
The Curse of the Red Moon

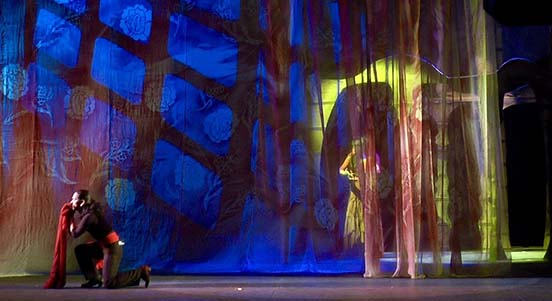
Adrian after his rejection by Aydanamara

- Market Day: It is market day and while the men rest in their homes the women of the village come to trade their wares. The feeling of celebration quickly turns to one of agitation at the arrival of the sorceress and her son Adrian. The emotion of agitation turns to one of desperation at Adrian's clumsy attempt to court the village beauty, Aydanamara. Eager to wreak petty retribution on the hated sorceress, Aydanamara's sisters, Aryana and Alba, convince Aydanamara to pretend to return Adrian's affections.
- The Betrayal: Spurned by Aydanamara, who Adrian finds in the arms of another man, Adrian attempts to possess her by throwing a red manton over her head in rage. Aydanamara rejects him once again while Aydanamara's sisters and the village women ridicule Adrian's despair.
- Adrian's Death: Betrayed and humiliated, lovelorn Adrian takes his own life and is found by his grieving mother, the sorceress. With frantic movements and an eerily still upper body, the sorceress uses her power to call down the curse of La Luna Roja.
- Vengeance: The sorceress returns to the village to cast her curse. While the village men are made to sleep, Aydanamara, her sisters and all village women who mocked her son are cursed: they are doomed to desire every man who enters the village then murder him once the red moon rises. The curse is doomed to repeat for eternity until the selfless act and true love break the spell.

=== Act 2 ===
Jamil and the Cursed Village

- The Village: Many years later a young man named Jamil stumbles upon a village and finds it filled with attractive young women. Jamil is flattered by all the women vying for his attention and flirts with shamelessly with them. He is particularly entranced by lovely young Alba who becomes the focus of his affections.
- The Lovers: The young lovers are finally alone together and profess their love for one another.
- The Sacrifice: The love between the Alba and Jamil brings La Luna Roja to life and the red moon begins to rise. The spellbound women are consumed by jealously, lust and rage and they encircle Jamil as the curse takes hold of them. In the throes of the curse one of the women leaps forward to kill Jamil but Alba, forsaking her own safety, rushes forward to shield him from the killing blow. She dies in his stead, finally breaking the curse with her selfless act. In one last cruel twist of fate, Aryana finds herself holding the blade which she used to kill her sister.
- Funeral March: The village women come together to lament Alba's death and honor her sacrifice. Aydanamara and Aryana mourn the curse that has forced them to take so many lives over the centuries and which has now taken their beloved sister away from them.
- Alba's farewell: Jamil too mourns the loss of Alba. His despair calls out to her and her spirit returns to console him. They dance together never seeing each other but feeling each other's presence until finally Alba leaves Jamil standing alone and longing for the woman he has lost.

== Characters and roles ==
- Sorceress – The main antagonist of the play, the sorceress is a powerful wise woman who lives in the cliffs above the village. The villagers, out of fear, have learned never to cross her. She loves no one and nothing except her son, Adrian.
- Aydanamara – The beautiful and bewitching Aydanama is the village beauty. She uses her beauty as a weapon to exact her revenge on the Sorceress in the name of the village.
- Adrian – The only son of the Sorceress. Having lived a sheltered life in the castle grounds protected by the Sorceress, Adrian is naive to the ways of the world and sees no malice in the villagers. His innocence makes him the perfect target for Aydanamara to exact her revenge upon him.
- Aryana – Aydanamara's second sister, she is the final weapon of the sorceress's vengeance.
- Jamil – A handsome young man who gets lost in the woods and finds himself in the cursed village.
- Alba – Aydanamara's youngest sister, her love for Jamil is the catalyst that breaks the curse.
- Rocio – Aydanamara's sister who the spirit of Alba brings together (2012 staging only)
- Village Women

== Vision ==
The ballet was the vision of Emma Estrada who decided to take the elements of the traditional ballet and incorporate them into flamenco. In an article in Business World, Emma Estrada described her path to the creation of the La Luna Roja and how she decided to mix the elements of a traditional ballet with the raw power and emotion of flamenco. Estrada discussed how traditional ballets such as Giselle, Nutcracker or Swan Lake were based on actual discernible stories. In contrast flamenco performances were more spontaneous since, in Estrada's opinion, the goal of a flamenco performance was to convey an emotion and not a story. Estrada acknowledged however the other flamenco tales which had been made into flamenco performances such as Blood Wedding and El Amor Brujo and called these her inspiration for her own ballet.

She more fully explained her vision in another interview, stating that her goal was to capture the uninhibited emotions of flamenco and turn these into a story. She described her starting point as that of a typical fairy tale, as is seen in many of the traditional ballets. There was a village, an evil magic user, a hero and heroine and a love that triumphs in the face of impossible odds. Estrada's vision was for the story to remain simple and traditional but transformed into a tale with "a distinctly flamenco flavour". Estrada also wanted to explore the "feminine mystique" describing the different roles of a mother that are celebrated in the play, such as the playful child, the arrogant beauty, the grief-stricken mother. When asked what she found challenging in creating the ballet, Estrada explained that given the Filipina's gentle and modest nature, bringing out the flamenco fire in them was a unique challenge. She described both the challenge and reward of bringing out the hidden fire in her dancers was to "strip away their masks" and "bare their souls".

== Performance ==
=== 2012 staging ===
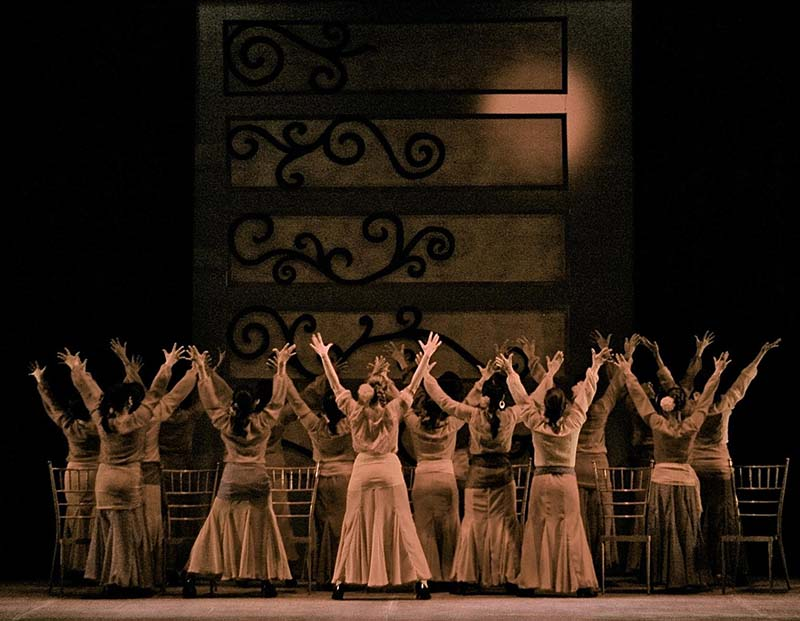
Frenzied Dance of the Cursed Women (La Luna Roja 2012)

La Luna Roja was first performed in 2012 as a brief ballet and was the second half of Fundacion Centro Flamenco's annual performance. Emma Estrada decided that for the 10th anniversary of the Fundacion Centro Flamenco she would push the boundaries of flamenco. She was determined to "use flamenco not only to convey raw emotion but to actually tell a story". "The past 10 years have brought a new wave of flamenco students" Ms. Estrada said "who enjoy blending the traditional soul of flamenco with more modern trends and innovative styles. I felt it was time to bring my vision of a flamenco ballet to life."

Consisting of the second part of the performance, the show was a condensed version of the tale. The ballet beings alludes to the curse that begins the tale; however in the interest of time the tale begins medias res. The ballet begins with the second act, focusing on the cursed village centuries after the curse has taken hold. The sisters awaken from their enchanted sleep in bewilderment, unsure of what has befallen them. The sorceress appears and menacingly points at each of them at each of them, the symbolic gesture of the curse.

The play then moves to the arrival of Jamil, the traveler, who wanders into the village centuries after the curse. Since it was part of an annual show, the first staging of La Luna Roja decided to follow the more standard fairy tale theme. This version ballet followed a traditional storyline which focused on the curse, the sacrifice and that sacrifice leading to the lifting of the curse and the joy of the village. Despite Alba's sacrifice the ballet ends on a happy note. Alba's departed spirit touches the soul of her younger sister Rocio and in their shared loss Jamil and Rocio bring forth a new found love. The fiesta ends happily with the dancers dancing the traditional Alegrias as the finale of the ballet.

=== 2017 staging ===
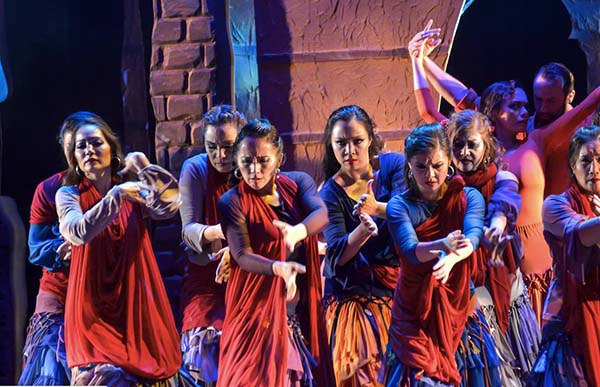
The cursed sisters dance (La Luna Roja 2017)

La Luna Roja was finally presented in its entirety in November 2017. Together with Leo Rialp, who worked with Estrada on the ballet's 2012 production, Estrada decided to collaborate with Spanish flamenco artists for the full length version of the ballet. Invited to perform were flamenco guitarists Rubén Campos-Campos and Alejandro Alcaraz, percussionist José Cortes, and singer Sergio Gómez. Estrada also collaborated with Javier Martos, a renowned flamenco artist and a professor of the famed flamenco school Carmen de las Cuevas (Granada). Martos not only played La Luna Roja's main protagonist Jamil but choreographed several of the dances for the ballet.

Now free of the time constraints of the 2012 performance, the ballet freely delved into the origin of the curse, the volatile relationship between the Sorceress and the villagers, the village's revenge and the death of the sorceress's son, the naive Adrian, whose death gave rise to the curse. In this staging of La Luna Roja, Estrada took another step away from the traditional fairy tale ending. The play remains similar at heart to the first iteration, but the curse is more poignant. It looks at darker themes such as betrayal and suicide. It biggest departure from the first ballet though was the finale. There is not happy ending waiting for Jamil, no new love to wash away his first loss. Instead of the typical fairytale ending where the hero and heroine come out unscathed, Jamil is forced to contend with the loss of Alba, dancing with nothing more than her memories. The ending to the 2017 ballet is bittersweet, without the comfort of the happy ending of the first staging.

Since this was the first foray of the Flamenco ballet on to the Philippine stage Emma Estrada decided to make the ballet a two night only event, where the ballet debuted to a full house at the RCBC Theatre.

=== 2019 staging ===
Emma Estrada's first showing of the full flamenco ballet in 2017 was a resounding success. With the story, choreography and cast now in place (including the promised return of celebrated flamenco dancer Javier Martos), Estrada and Rialp decided to use the time after the performance to polish a show "already amazing to begin with". Estrada called the period after the 2017 staging her time to reflect, "a time to revel in all the things that went right while making a "mental list of all things that could be done better". In November 2019, Emma Estrada and Leo Rialp, brought the polished La Luna back to the Philippine stage where the ballet again debuted to a full house at the RCBC theatre.

== Reception and reviews ==
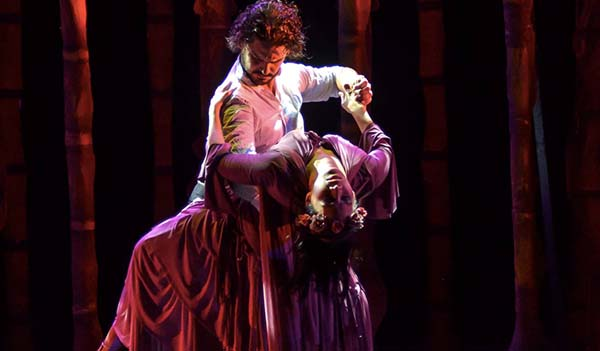
The Lover's Embrace (La Luna Roja 2017)

The staging and restaging of La Luna Roja were well received in the Philippines and performed before fully sold out theatres. Critics acknowledged the originality of the performance, an original tale made specifically for flamenco. ABS CBN calls the ballet a marriage of ballet with the "outpouring emotion" of flamenco. Another critic points out the difference between La Luna Roja and other traditional ballets which use traditional fairytales as a medium. According to the critic, La Luna Roja does not use "a worn out plotline" but instead harnesses flamenco's "seductively raw energy" to tell a new tale. Going further, the critic explains that ballet is enticing not only because of the tale but how the tale is told."

The Philippine Star praised the flamenco ballet, calling Emma Estrada’s La Luna Roja "a compelling demonstration of how flamenco can convey a story of passion through passion." The Philippine Star likened the play to an interplay between restraint and release, "the way passion always is". Lifestyle Asia echoed the sentiment, declaring that "Flamenco passion ignites with the staging of the Philippines first original flamenco ballet."

Mantle described the 2019 performance as one "that fully immerses the audience in the passions at play" and one which "commanded my attention with every intense step".

The choreography and artistry of the dancers, especially Jamil, played by the intense Javier Martos, was singled out as well, with Javier's movements are characterized as a "combining of the two diametrically opposed elements, ice and fire "the near-possessed frenzy of flamenco heating up the coolly elegant poetry of ballet". The writer praises Javier's ability to mix the impassioned sentiments of flamenco with ballet's tender pas deux, and that the combination is felt rather than forced.

== La Luna Roja at EFA's 2020 International Festival ==
After staging its ballet in 2017, Fundacion Centro Flamenco has since been accredited by the prestigious Escuela de Flamenco de Andalucia ("EFA") in Malaga, one of the world's most influential organizations in flamenco. In 2020 EFA asked Fundacion Centro Flamenco to perform La Luna Roja as one of the two guest countries performing for its international festival. Unfortunately due to the pandemic the live festival did not push through and was instead transformed into a virtual festival. Participants of the international festival were asked to submit a shortened version of the performance which EFA has since showcased on their YouTube Page Fundación Centro Flamenco - Sede EFA Filipinas.
