= The Wedding (TV series) =

2009 Philippine television drama series

- Title card
- Genre: Romantic comedy; Drama
- Directed by: Jeffrey Jeturian; Mae Czarina Cruz
- Starring: Anne Curtis; Zanjoe Marudo; Derek Ramsay
- Opening theme: "Can't Help Falling in Love" by Sam Milby
- Ending theme: "When I Fall in Love" by Yeng Constantino
- Country of origin: Philippines
- Original language: Filipino
- No. of episodes: 50

Production
- Executive producers: Justine Javier; Des Juan
- Production companies: RGD; ECS

Original release
- Network: ABS-CBN
- Release: June 29 – September 4, 2009

The Wedding is a 2009 Philippine television drama romantic series broadcast by ABS-CBN. Directed by Jeffrey Jeturian and Mae Czarina Cruz, it stars Anne Curtis, Zanjoe Marudo and Derek Ramsay. It aired from June 29 to September 4, 2009, replacing Pinoy Bingo Night and was replaced by Florinda.

== Production ==
The original airing date was May 11, 2009, but during that time, Eula Valdez still had commitments with All About Eve on GMA Network. They made a deal to air the series after the end of her show on the rival network.

== Plot ==
Candice de Meñes (Anne Curtis), is a loving daughter who will do everything to prevent her parents from separating. In her desperate attempt to save her parents' relationship, she will scheme her engagement to Mr. Wrong, Marlon (Zanjoe Marudo), a poor engineer working for her father. Candice's initial scheme develops into a full-fledged whirlwind romance leading to preparations for a real wedding to prove the true love they have found. But what if Candice's first and great love Warren (Derek Ramsay), the Mr. Right she has waited for so long, returns to claim her back? What will Candice choose – a love worth fighting for or a love worth waiting for?

== Cast ==
=== Main cast ===
- Anne Curtis as Candice de Meñes - a hopeless romantic girl who dreams that one day she will walk down the aisle with her dream man. She resorts to the desperate act of getting engaged to a complete stranger to ease tensions between her parents and prevent them from separating.
- Zanjoe Marudo as Marlon Mañalac - is a hardworking contractor born into a poor family whose ambition to live a well-off life will drive him to accept Candice's proposal. He is considered as Candice's true love. Candice and Marlon will end up falling in love.
- Derek Ramsay as Warren Garcintorena/Philip Garcintorena - Warren is a wealthy swimmer and promiscuous party animal. Although his charm attracts most of the women, his one great love is Candice, his childhood sweetheart. He is considered Candice's first love and ideal dream man. He has also a long-lost older identical twin brother named Philip as a priest.

=== Supporting cast ===
- Michael de Mesa as Frank de Meñes
- Eula Valdez as Audrey de Meñes
- William Martinez as Sammy Mañalac
- Irma Adlawan as Grace Mañalac
- Chinggoy Alonzo as Orson Garcintorena
- Tetchie Agbayani as Natalie Aquino
- Megan Young as Janice de Castro
- Angel Sy as Shirley Mañalac

=== Extended cast ===
- Desiree del Valle as Oona
- Alwyn Uytingco as Clark
- Hiyasmin Neri as Sophia
- Zeppi Borromeo as Elvis
- Jaja Gonzales as Ingrid
- Baron Geisler as Monty
- Neil Ryan Sese as Charlie
- Perla Bautista as Yaya Greta
- Lito Legaspi as Lawrence
- Mich Dulce as Tina
- Luane Dy as Vivien
- Nanding Josef as Lolo Bogart
- Neil Coleta as Mark

=== Guest cast ===
- Izzy Canillo as Young Warren
- Quintin Alianza as Young Marlon
- Kian Kazemi as Von
- Frenchie Dy as Marilyn
- Bam Romana as Rex
- Macy Garcia as Kathleen
- Richard Poon as Himself
- John James Uy as Sam
- Ricky Rivero
- Michael Cruz

== See also ==
- List of programs broadcast by ABS-CBN
