= Alma Bella =

Filipino actress (1910-2012

- Born: 13 March 1910; Batangas City, Philippines
- Died: 11 May 2012 (aged 102); New York City, U.S
- Occupation: Actress
- Years active: 1932–1951
- Spouses: Winston Leuiman (m. 1934; died 1946) William Tremont (m. 1963; died 1988)
- Children: 3

Alma Bella (13 March 1910, Batangas City, Batangas, Philippines – 11 May 2012, New York City) was a Filipina actress.

== Filmography ==
- 1932 - Sa Pinto ng Langit
- 1932 - Satanas
- 1932 - Ulong Inasnan
- 1933 - Pag-ibig ng Isang Kadete
- 1933 - Ang Punyal na Ginto
- 1933 - Ang Mga Ulila
- 1936 - Ama
- 1937 - Umaraw sa Hatinggabi
- 1937 - Magkapatid
- 1938 - Ang Batang Tulisan
- 1938 - Dugong Hinugasan
- 1938 - Biyaya ni Bathala
- 1939 - Pighati
- 1939 - Mga Pusong Lumuluha
- 1940 - Inang Pulot
- 1948 - 4 na Dalangin
- 1948 - Siete Dolores
- 1949 - Ang Lumang Simbahan
- 1950 - Pedro, Pablo, Juan at Jose
- 1950 - Aklat ng Pag-ibig
- 1951 - Irog, Paalam
