= Extreme Evidence =

2003 American reality TV series

- Genre: Reality
- Theme music composer: Stephen Arnold Music
- Country of origin: United States
- Original language: English
- No. of seasons: 1
- No. of episodes: 30

Production
- Running time: 23 minutes

Original release
- Network: Court TV
- Release: September 29, 2003 – December 30, 2005

Extreme Evidence is an American reality television series that premiered on Court TV on September 29, 2003. Each half-hour episode attempts to use forensic science to uncover the cause of a catastrophic event. 3-D animation, and first-hand accounts from eyewitnesses, are used to illuminate the investigations. As of late January 2015, the show is now in reruns on the Justice Network.

== Production ==
Court TV used several production companies to produce episodes of Extreme Evidence, including LMNO Cable Group, Medstar Television, and New York Times Television.

== Episodes ==
| Title | Original release date | Prod. code |
|---|---|---|
| "Desert Disaster" | September 29, 2003 | 101 |
| "Mystery on the Mississippi" | October 3, 2003 | 102 |
| "The Missing Pin" | October 5, 2003 | 103 |
| "Shipwreck!" | October 7, 2003 | 104 |
| "Hack Attack" | December 2, 2004 | 105 |
| "Death Car" | November 15, 2003 | 106 |
| "Visibility Zero" | July 25, 2004 | 107 |
| "Flashover" | October 31, 2004 | 108 |
| "Fatal Fog" | June 5, 2004 | 109 |
| "Mystery Oil Spill" | January 22, 2004 | 110 |
| "Sudden Tailspin" | July 8, 2004 | 112 |
| "Total Collapse" | October 21, 2004 | 113 |
| "Columbia Countdown" | July 1, 2004 | 114 |
| "Dangerous Waters" | July 8, 2004 | 115 |
| "Danger Below" | November 1, 2004 | 116 |
| "Blackout" | December 6, 2004 | 117 |
| "Fire in the Sky" | March 26, 2005 | 118 |
| "Toxic Nightmare" | April 16, 2005 | 119 |
| "Wild Wonder" | January 11, 2005 | 121 |
| "Outbreak" | January 27, 2005 | 123 |
| "Final Takeoff" | November 23, 2005 | 125 |
| "Mystery Blast" | May 7, 2005 | 126 |
| "Air Tanker Disasters" | March 7, 2005 | 127 |
| "Houseboat Mystery" | December 30, 2005 | 128 |
| "Trucker's Nightmare" | April 9, 2005 | 129 |
| "Wild Fire" | April 2, 2005 | 130 |
