= Pinoy Bingo Night =

2009 Filipino television show

- Title card
- Genre: Game show
- Created by: Andrew Glassman
- Directed by: Bobet Vidanes
- Presented by: Kris Aquino
- Starring: Isko "Brod Pete" Salvador (Bingo Caller); Mel Feliciano (Bingo Commissioner)
- Country of origin: Philippines
- Original language: Tagalog
- No. of seasons: 1
- No. of episodes: 63

Production
- Executive producer: Morly Stewart Nueva
- Production locations: Cainta, Rizal
- Camera setup: Multiple-camera setup
- Running time: 45 minutes (including commercials)
- Production companies: ABS-CBN Studios; Fox World; Glassman Media

Original release
- Network: ABS-CBN
- Release: March 30 – June 26, 2009

Related
- National Bingo Night (American game show)

Pinoy Bingo Night is a 2009 Philippine television game show broadcast by ABS-CBN. The show is based on the American game show National Bingo Night. Hosted by Kris Aquino. It aired on the network's Primetime Bida line up from March 30 to June 26, 2009, replacing the third season of Kapamilya, Deal or No Deal and was replaced by The Wedding.

== Gameplay ==
Members of the studio audience attempt to win a game of bingo while competing against a solo studio contestant. Each episode consisted of two games without any distinction other than its order (the original version has three games represented by red, white and blue bingo cards). Furthermore, the bingo cards used in this show don't have the "Free" space in the center. Originally, there were two groups each playing a game, but later the games involved one studio audience, each member holding two cards and the winners in the first game were replaced by new players.

Most solo studio contestants are celebrities, but it has been normal people in several occasions. After 39 episodes, two celebrities play one game.

In each game, the solo contestant competes in a minigame that also serves to unveil the numbers being called for the game. He or she then tries to complete the minigame and outlast the audience before they could declare bingo. If they are successful, they win ₱1,000,000; if an audience member beats them to it, they walk away with nothing and the audience member wins ₱50,000. In case of a tie, the audience member still wins.

After 16 episodes, the game rules have been changed. From the 17th episode onwards, an episode only consists of one game. When only one audience member gets a bingo, the audience member is given the option to take over from the first solo contestant to become the second and finish the game to win a million. If the audience member decides to take the spot, he/she must risk half of the ₱50,000 and continue the game to win ₱1,000,000. The other audience members who are one ball away from winning (or puro, the local term used) are still playing for a bingo. If an audience member gets a bingo, he/she will get ₱50,000 while the second solo contestant that took over still gets ₱25,000. In case more than one audience member won over the first solo contestant(s), they would be given individual choices on whether to continue the solo contestant's game. If more than one of them decide to continue and eventually win the solo contestant's game, they would each have a share of the million-peso price; they would take home ₱25,000 each should they continue the game and lose. In case at least one audience member gains a bingo just as the solo player finishes the game (still applying the audience-member-wins rule), the winning audience member will not have to replay the last moments of the game anymore, and instead is automatically given ₱50,000.

Contestants could only use certain drawn balls to put towards their game, determined by correctly guessing whether the next number is either red or black, odd or even, depending on the rules given by host.

The minigames and their rules are as follows:

- Bingo 500: The contestant aims to have all their bingo balls drawn add up to 500. In order to be credited to the total, the contestant has to correctly guess that the next drawn ball is odd or even or its text is colored red or black depending on the rules given by the host.
- 9 Ball: The contestant aims to eliminate the billiard balls 1 to 9. In order for this to happen, the contestant must guess if the next drawn ball is odd or even or its text is colored red or black depending on the rules given by the host. A correct guess would eliminate the billiard balls corresponding to the digits on the drawn ball.
- Money Bags: The contestant chooses one of three ten-digit bank account numbers. The player has to eliminate the digits of the account number in the same way as in 9-Ball (if a digit appears at least twice in the number, all instances of that digit is eliminated). In order for this to happen, the contestant must guess if the text on the next drawn ball is colored red or black or if it is odd or even depending on the rules given by the host.
- High 7: The contestant has to draw six balls bearing the number 7 (such as "B-7," "I-17," etc.).
- Around the Philippines: Twelve Philippine place names are listed. The player must eliminate each of the twelve by correctly guessing if the next drawn ball is odd or even or if the text is red or black depending on the rules given by the host.
- Bingo Crossword: Two of the word bingo, intersected at letter I, crossword-style, is shown. The contestant must guess if the text of the next ball drawn is colored red or black. A correct guess would highlight a letter corresponding to the one on the drawn ball. In order to win, the player must have the word "BINGO" highlighted both vertically and horizontally on the puzzle.

During the duration of the program's run, there have been eleven millionaires and one millionaire team.

== Homeviewer game ==
Home viewers could collect pre-printed game cards by exchanging proofs-of-purchase of the show's sponsors or purchase items totaling a certain amount, depending on the sponsor. 20 numbers are drawn and nine of those numbers should appear in an X-pattern on the card for it to be declared a winning card. Winning cards could be redeemed for a single ₱150,000 daily cash prize and a ₱50,000 bonus cash prize. Holders of the cards must register the cards' serial numbers through SMS in order for the cards to be qualified for the additional bonus cash prize. An additional ₱50,000 is added to the bonus cash prize for every day it is not won by a registered bingo card holder. Also, in case there is more than one winner, regardless of whether or not they were registered, they would have to share the daily cash prize. Only one registered card holder could win the bonus prize, and if there is more than registered winning card holder, the prize is raffled off. Also, cards are playable for one week (five episodes), but the set of drawn balls for the cards is different for each day of the week. The balls drawn for this game are different from those used in the studio games.

A second homeviewers' game is also launched viewers note and send via SMS the last ball of each of the two games in the episode. The cash prize the winner receives depends on who won on the two games. If one solo player wins a million, the homeviewer winner gets ₱100,000. If both solo players win a million each, the homeviewer would win ₱200,000. If both solo players are beaten by at least a studio contestant each, the winning viewer would receive ₱10,000. The rules were slightly modified since the rule change to one game per episode, wherein the last ball drawn should be noted.
