= Solar TV =

Defunct television network in the Philippines

- Type: Broadcast commercial television network
- Country: Philippines
- Availability: Defunct
- Owner: Solar Entertainment Corporation (STVNI/Nine Media)
- Key people: Wilson Tieng (President, Solar Entertainment); William Tieng (Chairman, Solar Entertainment); Willy Y. Tieng (Vice-chairman, Solar Entertainment); Tonypet Albano (President and CEO, Radio Philippines Network)
- Launch date: November 29, 2009; 16 years ago
- Dissolved: February 25, 2011; 15 years ago
- Picture format: NTSC 480i (SDTV)
- Affiliation: Radio Philippines Network
- Official website: Solar TV website
- Language: English (main); Filipino (secondary)
- Replaced by: Talk TV; ETC (channel space)

Solar TV (stylized as SOLARtv) was the flagship television network of Solar Entertainment Corporation's television arm subsidiary Solar TV Network, Inc., the precursor of Nine Media Corporation, which is the replacement of C/S 9. This was the revival of the former Solar channel Solar USA.

== History ==
The channel launched on November 29, 2009, at 11:00am with a slogan It's A Bright New World on RPN.

On October 31, 2010, it changed some of its programming content to English/Tagalog with a new slogan Kung Saan Lahat Panalo!.

It ended its broadcast on February 25, 2011 at 1am, with the last program is Jai-Alai: The Game of a Thousand Thrills, before the channel officially closed at the 1:00AM., in 5 days after RPN shutdowns, a Solar Entertainment bought RPN and programming of ETC (now as SolarFlix) was transferred to RPN but will remain as a corporate brand of television arm subsidiary of Solar (now a subsidiary of ALC Group of Companies since August 23, 2014).

== Programs ==
- America's Best Dance Crew
- America's Got Talent
- Ben 10: Alien Force
- Barney & Friends
- Bear in the Big Blue House
- Burn Notice
- Dollhouse
- DOG TV
- Entertainment Tonight
- Eureka
- Fringe
- Grossology
- Hatol ng Bayan AutoVote 2010
- Heroes
- Home Shopping Network
- Human Target
- Jai Alai Cagayan
- Johnny Test
- Kamen Rider Dragon Knight
- Law & Order: Special Victims Unit
- Lie to Me
- Minute to Win It
- NBA on Solar TV
- NBC Nightly News
- NCIS
- One Morning Cafe
- PBA on Solar TV
- Queer Eye for the Straight Guy
- Real NBA
- RPN NewsWatch
- RPN NewsCap
- RPN NewsWatch Update
- Sabrina: The Animated Series
- Saved by the Bell
- Sesame Street
- Solar's Big Ticket
- Super Robot Monkey Team Hyperforce Go!
- Survivor
  - Survivor: Nicaragua
- The Biggest Loser
- The Ellen DeGeneres Show
- The Fresh Prince of Bel-Air
- The Insider
- The Jay Leno Show
- The Jerry Springer Show
- The Main Event
- The Price Is Right
- The Real Housewives of New Jersey
- The Vampire Diaries
- Trollz
- Totally Spies!
- Versus
- Winx Club
- World Class Boxing
- World's Most Amazing Videos
- WWE Raw (one-hour edition)
- WWE SmackDown (one-hour edition)
