= Nelly Sindayen =

Filipino journalist

Nelly Sindayen (April 7, 1949 – April 4, 2009) was a Filipino journalist. She was best known for her longtime association with Time magazine as a correspondent based in Manila.

== Life ==
Nelly Sindayen was born in Siasi, Sulu to Muslim parents. She earned a journalism degree at the University of Santo Tomas and worked for the Manila Bulletin and various news agencies before joining Time magazine in the mid-1970s. Sindayen would remain at Time until 2007, when illness disabled her from returning to work.

While at Time, Sindayen scored a notable scoop in 1983 concerning the supposed kidnapping of Tommy Manotoc, future son-in-law of President Ferdinand Marcos. Sindayen reported for Time that Manotoc had in fact gone to the Dominican Republic to obtain a quick divorce, then headed to the United States to secretly marry Marcos's eldest daughter, Imee. Sindayen also reported on the controversies that hounded President Joseph Estrada, and narrated an eye-witness account on an aborted coup plot against President Gloria Macapagal Arroyo in February 2006.

== Death ==
Nelly Sindayen suffered a severe diabetic stroke in June 2007 and died from lingering complications on April 4, 2009, three days before her 60th birthday.
