= Alex Magno (political scientist) =

Philippine academic

Alexander R. Magno
- Occupations: Professor, Political Analyst, Columnist
- Employer(s): University of the Philippines, National Defense College of the Philippines
- Known for: Political analysis, academia

Academic background
- Education: University of the Philippines Diliman (AB, MA)

Alexander R. Magno, popularly known as Professor Alex Magno, is a political scientist and academician in the Philippines.

== Early life and education ==
Magno earned a Bachelor of Arts in political science from the University of the Philippines Diliman in 1975. He also obtained a Certificate from the University of Poitiers in France in 1980; and a Master of Arts in political science from the University of the Philippines Diliman in 1981.

== Academe ==
Magno is a long-time faculty member at the Department of Political Science of the College of Social Sciences and Philosophy at the University of the Philippines Diliman. He has been the executive director of the University of the Philippines Third World Studies Center from 1994 to 1997. He also served as a consultant at the United Nations University from 1985 to 1988.

== Government service ==
Magno was appointed by Philippine President Gloria Macapagal Arroyo as director of the Development Bank of the Philippines, one of the largest government financial institutions. Later, the President appointed him to concurrently serve as a member of the Consultative Commission for Charter Change, an independent body tasked to study and make recommendations for changes in the 1987 Philippine Constitution.

He served as a Special Adviser to the Speaker of the House of Representatives from 1996 to 1998. He was also a consultant at the Department of Finance from 1996 to 1998; a consultant at the Department of Trade from 1996 to 1998; a consultant for the Peace Process at the Office of the Executive Secretary in 1996; and a consultant at the Philippine Senate from 1988 to 1998.

== Media ==
Magno is an editorial columnist in such national dailies as the Manila Standard, Abante, and The Philippine Star. He is a contributing columnist at the Asian Wall Street Journal and at the Gulfnews. He was the editor of the Nation in Crisis, a publication of the University of the Philippines, in 1984.

== Organizational affiliations ==
Magno is a commissioner of the EDSA People Power Commission, a nonprofit advocacy group established by former Philippine President Corazon Aquino to promote and preserve democracy and nonviolence in the country and elsewhere in the world.

He is also the president of the Foundation for Economic Freedom, and a long-time member of the Philippine Political Science Association.

He has also served as a member of the board of directors of Steelasia Manufacturing Corporation from 1998 to 2001.
