= Word of Mouth (TV program) =

Philippine television show

- Genre: Cooking show
- Presented by: Sandy Daza; Patty Loanzon
- Country of origin: Philippines
- Original languages: Tagalog; English

Production
- Executive producer: Jojun Loanzon
- Camera setup: Multiple-camera setup
- Running time: 30 minutes
- Production companies: Epicurio, Inc.

Original release
- Network: Q Network
- Release: 2009

Word of Mouth is a Philippine television cooking show broadcast by Q. Hosted by Sandy Daza and Patty Loanzon, it premiered in 2009.
