= Alexis Tioseco and Nika Bohinc =

Filipino film critics and murder victims

Alexis Tioseco
- Born: c. 1980/1981; Philippines
- Died: September 1, 2009; Quezon City, Philippines
- Occupation: Film critic
- Partner: Nika Bohinc

Nika Bohinc
- Born: 1979; Slovenia
- Died: September 1, 2009 (aged 29–30); Quezon City, Philippines
- Occupation: Film critic
- Partner: Alexis Tioseco

Alexis Tioseco and Nika Bohinc were film critics who were murdered on 1 September 2009 in Quezon City, Philippines. Prior to their deaths, the two had been living as a couple. Tioseco was a Filipino Canadian film critic and a film professor at the University of Asia and the Pacific. Recognized as an advocate of Southeast Asian cinema and as Philippine cinema's most passionate champion, he was named by the Philippine Star in 2005 as "one of the most important young people in the Philippines today" for his efforts to promote his nation's cinema. He was the editor of the Southeast Asian film journal Criticine. Bohinc was a Slovene film critic.

== Biographies ==
Tioseco was born in the Philippines, but moved with his family to Canada in 1983. In 1996, he returned to the Philippines where he completed his college studies and worked in the family business.

Tioseco credited the Lav Diaz film Batang West Side as having awakened his interest in Philippine cinema. He established a website, criticine.com, which was hailed in Filmmaker as "arguably the most influential, intelligent blog on Southeast Asian cinema". Tioseco became known for his efforts to expose foreign audiences to Philippine independent cinema. He helped organize established filmmakers in a failed attempt to seek reforms to the Metro Manila Film Festival.

His 2008 article in Rogue, styled as a love letter to his partner Nika Bohinc, was later named by American film writer Gabe Klinger, writing in The Auteurs, as "the definitive manifesto on Philippine film [that] will soon become a canonical piece of critical writing." Apart from Rogue, Tioseco contributed to The Philippine Star, Screen International and Senses of Cinema, as well as to catalogues of the Torino and Pesaro International Film Festivals. At the time of his death in 2009, he was a regular contributor to UNO, a Philippine men's magazine. He likewise joined the faculty of the Arts Department of the University of Asia and the Pacific. Tioseco also participated as a jury in several international film festivals. It was at the 2007 Rotterdam Film Festival that the Slovenian film critic Nika Bohinc would become Tioseco's romantic partner.

== Murders ==
On the night of 1 September 2009, Tioseco was killed at his Quezon City home in an apparent burglary staged by three armed men who fled the scene. He was 28 years old. Bohinc, who had moved to the Philippines to be with Tioseco, was also slain. Police were investigating the participation in the crime of a stay-in housemaid recently hired by Tioseco, who had fled together with the suspects.

Tioseco is interred at the family mausoleum in Angeles City.

On 26 February 2016, the woman accused in the murders of the couple was arrested in Angeles City. In May 2018, Criselda Dayag (formerly the couple's housemaid) was convicted of robbery with homicide, and sentenced to forty years imprisonment.
