= C/S 9 =

Defunct television channel in the Philippines

- Type: Broadcast commercial television network
- Country: Philippines

Programming
- Languages: English (main); Filipino (secondary)
- Picture format: NTSC 480i (SDTV)

Ownership
- Owner: Radio Philippines Network (50%); Solar Entertainment Corporation (STVNI/Nine Media) (50%)
- Key people: Wilson Tieng (President, Solar Entertainment); William Tieng (Chairman, Solar Entertainment); Willy Y. Tieng (Vice-chairman, Solar Entertainment); Orlando Mercado (President and CEO, Radio Philippines Network)

History
- Launched: October 4, 2008
- Closed: November 28, 2009
- Replaced by: Solar TV

C/S (originally known as Crime/Suspense) was an entertainment channel owned by Solar Entertainment Corporation, a media company based in Makati, Philippines. It showed mostly American crime and suspense dramas, mysteries, reality, science fiction and action shows. It was the successor to Solar USA, after the latter was replaced by Jack TV. C/S is shown on cable networks throughout the Philippines.

== History ==
Crime/Suspense started operations as Solar USA. In 2005, Jack TV replaced Solar USA and a separate new channel, Crime/Suspense, started test broadcasting on October 15, 2005. On January 1, 2008, the channel became C/S and is now being both on as a cable channel and as a free TV channel through Radio Philippines Network (RPN).

While C/S would retain its official original abbreviation meaning (Crime/Suspense), RPN added a second meaning, Conservation/Survival, as RPN and Solar Entertainment's joint commitment for environment and ecological awareness.

C/S on RPN had its major revamp on October 4, 2008, and later became C/S 9, while C/S on Cable TV remains as C/S Origin.

C/S 9 ceased broadcasting on November 28, 2009, and was replaced by Solar TV.

== C/S Origin ==
The cable TV C/S was relaunched as a new channel called C/S Origin. This channel started airing on September 14, 2008, in Global Destiny Cable.

== Former shows ==
=== RPN programs ===
- Home Shopping Network
- Malacanang Press Conference
- One Morning Cafe
- RPN NewsWatch First Edition
- RPN NewsWatch Junior Edition
- RPN NewsWatch Second Edition
- RPN NewsWatch Update
- RPN NewsWatch Aksyon Balita (January 1–4, 2008)
- RPN iWatch News (January 1–4, 2008)
- RPN News Update (January 1–4, 2008)
- Sagip Bayan
- The Working President

=== C/S Originals ===
==== Procedural dramas ====
- 24
- Bones
- Close to Home
- Cold Case
- Law & Order: Criminal Intent
- Law & Order: Special Victims Unit
- Law & Order
- La Femme Nikita
- The Kill Point
- New Amsterdam
- Prison Break
- The Closer
- The Nine
- The Sopranos
- The Unit
- Without A Trace

==== Science fiction ====
- Battlestar Galactica
- Bionic Woman
- Eureka
- Heroes
- Moonlight
- The X-Files

==== Comedy ====
- Chuck
- Psych

==== Reality ====
- American Gladiators
- Who Wants to be a Superhero?

=== C/S Chronicles ===
==== Documentary/Factuals ====
- 7 Deadly Hollywood Sins
- Dominick Dunne: Power, Privilege, & Justice
- World's Most Amazing Videos
- Maximum Exposure

=== C/S Movie blocks ===
- Big Hit Movies
- C/S Blockbusters
- C/S Movie Mania

=== Sports ===
- NBA on C/S9
- PBA on C/S9
- WWE Raw
- WWE SmackDown
- WWE Pay-Per View Events

=== Anime series ===
- Yu-Gi-Oh!
- Dragon Ball Z
