= 2008 in the Philippines =

- Decades: 1980s; 1990s; 2000s; 2010s; 2020s
- See also: List of years in the Philippines; films; television

2008 in the Philippines details events of note that happened in the Philippines in the year 2008.

== Incumbents ==
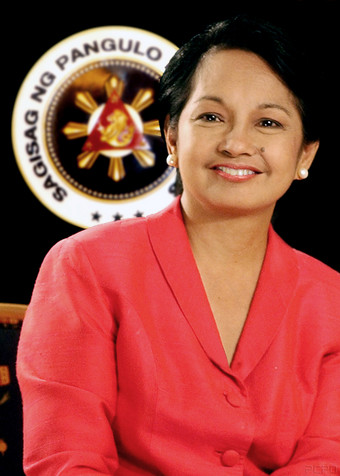
Gloria Macapagal
M. Arroyo

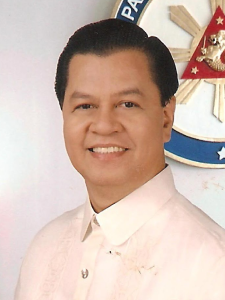
Noli L.
de Castro Jr.

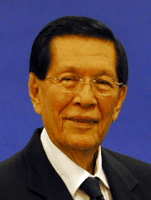
Juan Ponce F.
Enrile

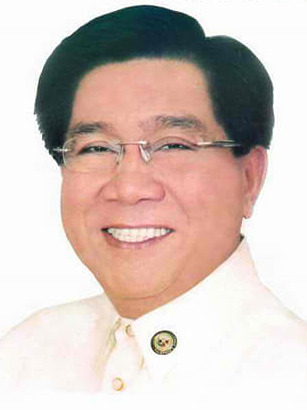
Prospero C.
Nograles

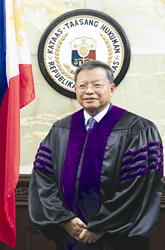
Reynato S.
Puno

- President: Gloria Macapagal Arroyo (Lakas-Kampi)
- Vice President: Noli de Castro (Independent)
- Senate President: Manuel Villar; Juan Ponce Enrile
- House Speaker: Jose de Venecia; Prospero Nograles
- Chief Justice: Reynato Puno
- Philippine Congress: 14th Congress of the Philippines

== Events ==
=== January ===
- January 31 – The National Economic and Development Authority announces that the country's 2007 full year gross domestic product indicated a growth of 7.3%, and a growth of 7.8% for the gross national product, the highest such figures since 1977.

=== February ===
- February 4–5 – The House of Representatives votes to replace House Speaker Jose de Venecia with Prospero Nograles. Shortly before his removal, de Venecia criticized the administration of President Gloria Macapagal Arroyo and announced to the media that he was joining the political opposition.
- February 8 – Jun Lozada, an official with the DENR, testify before the Philippine Senate that former COMELEC Chairman Benjamin Abalos offered a 200 million peso bribe to then-NEDA Chairman Romulo Neri in connection with the National Broadband Network contract, and that Neri had instructed him not to implicate the husband of President Arroyo in the controversy.
- February 15 – The Supreme Court nullify warnings issued in 2006 by the Secretary of Justice and the NTC against the airing of the so-called "Hello Garci" tapes.

=== March ===
- March 6
  - Several members of Congress call for an investigation into a 2004 joint oil exploration agreement between the Philippines, China and Vietnam over the disputed Spratly Islands, claiming that the agreement was unconstitutional and infringed on national sovereignty.
  - Filipino authorities announce the arrest of three men from Jordan and Indonesia in connection with an alleged plot to bomb the United States embassy and three other foreign missions in Manila. Two other suspects in the plot were later arrested in Boracay.
- March 11 – A Manila trial court acquits former First Lady Imelda Marcos of 32 counts of illegal money transfers.
- March 17 – The Supreme Court of the United States hear oral arguments on a certiorari petition filed by the Philippine government, which invoked sovereign immunity in connection with the enforcement of an American civil judgment against the estate of former President Ferdinand Marcos in favor of 9,500 human rights victims.
- March 25 – The Supreme Court rules that the Senate may not compel former NEDA Secretary Romulo Neri to divulge his conversations with President Macapagal-Arroyo relating the bribery attempts surrounding the National Broadband Network contract.

=== April ===
- April 1 – Social Welfare and Development Secretary Esperanza Cabral calls for a ban on foreigners availing of Philippine kidney transplants, after reports of destitute Filipinos selling their kidneys for paltry sums.
- April 7 – Amidst growing concerns over a feared shortage of rice in the Philippines, President Macapagal-Arroyo lifts quotas on the importation of rice by private traders.
- April 8 – Police seize hundreds of bomb components in Alaminos, Laguna, following a raid that targeted a Filipino with alleged links to Jemaah Islamiyah.
- April 8 – Nine military officers receive prison sentences from a Makati trial court for their role in the 2003 Oakwood mutiny.
- April 22 - Supreme Court rejects the Asia’s Emerging Dragon Corp. (AEDC) to bid over the proposed operation of Ninoy Aquino International Airport Terminal 3.

=== May ===
- May 16 - RCBC robbery-massacre – Shooting and massacre in RCBC Cabuyao branch, the deadliest robbery in the Philippines.
- May 14–23 – Severe Tropical Storm Halong, known in the Philippines as Severe Tropical Storm Cosme, is the fourth severe tropical storm named by the Japan Meteorological Agency (JMA) who are the Regional Specialized Meteorological Centre for the Northwestern Pacific Ocean. The Joint Typhoon Warning Center also recognised Halong as the fifth tropical depression, the fourth tropical storm as well as the third typhoon of the 2008 Pacific typhoon season.
- May 27 – The Manila Electric Company (MERALCO) holds its tension-filled annual stockholders meeting, which lasted for more than 13 hours, making it the longest stockholders' meeting in Philippine corporate history. The head of the state pension fund Government Service Insurance System Winston Garcia filed a motion to the Securities and Exchange Commission to suspend the stockholders' meeting after it questioned the proxy votes in favor of the Lopez family. The Meralco board proceeded with the company's stockholders' meeting, defying a cease and desist order issued by the Securities and Exchange Commission after it questioned the authenticity of the injunction order. After the rally and resistance of the stockholders against the bloc of Winston Garcia, the Lopez family retained control of Meralco. The stockholders awarded five board seats to its representatives and only four seats to the representatives of the government. It took independent auditor SGV and Co. seven hours to come out with the results of the voting.

=== June ===
- June 8–19 – Ces Oreña-Drilon, news anchor of ABS-CBN's late night television program Bandila, together with her crew and a Mindanao university professor, is initially reported to have been kidnapped by the Abu Sayyaf in Maimbung, Sulu, by the rebel group Abu Sayyaf on June 8. On June 12, Angelo Valderama, the assistant cameraman from Drilon's crew, was released. The abductors named Indanan, Sulu mayor Alvarez S. Isnaji as their emissary. On June 16, Abu Sayyaf issued an ultimatum. The rebel group demanded for ransom amounting to P15 million by noontime of June 17, in exchange for the release of Drilon, Encarnacion and Dinampo The deadline was extended and the hostages were freed before midnight of June 18. On June 18 Ces Drilon and her crew were taken to Jolo, Sulu. Afterwards, they were brought by the Philippine army to Zamboanga city for a press conference. Philippine Senator Loren Legarda joined the released hostages and was reported to be the negotiator to the Abu Sayyaf. Legarda and the released hostages flew afterwards to Manila for another press conferences, and were brought to The Medical City afterwards for medication. PNP declared the Isnajis as suspects in the kidnapping of Drilon, her crew, and Dinampo on June 19.
- June 17–27 – Typhoon Fengshen, known in the Philippines as Typhoon Frank, is the sixth named storm and the fourth typhoon recognised by the Japan Meteorological Agency. The Joint Typhoon Warning Center recognised Fengshen as the seventh tropical depression, the sixth tropical storm, and fifth typhoon of the 2008 Pacific typhoon season. Fengshen made a direct hit on the Philippines and China, causing severe damage and resulted in at least 1,371 deaths and leaving 87 people missing. Most of the deaths occurred in the Philippines, including 846 of the 922 people on board the Princess of the Stars who were killed when the ship capsized.
- June 20–21 – The ship MV Princess of the Stars, owned by Sulpicio Lines that carried 626 passengers and 121 crew members, stalls in rough seas near Sibuyan Island in the central Philippines. The ship left Manila Saturday morning. Typhoon Frank caused the ship to sink, though it was previously reported that the ship experienced engine failure.

=== August ===
- August 11 – Automated elections were implemented in the Philippines for the first time with 2008 Autonomous Region in Muslim Mindanao (ARMM) election.
- August 25 – The peace talks between Government of the Philippines (GRP) and Moro Islamic Liberation Front (MILF) collapse after the Supreme Court declares the Memorandum of Agreement on Ancestral Domain (MOA-AD) is unconstitutional. This leads to a resumption of hostilities in Cotabato and Lanao del Norte.

=== November ===
- November 18 – Cities of Baybay, Leyte; Bogo, Cebu; Catbalogan, Samar; Tandag, Surigao del Sur; Lamitan, Basilan; Borongan, Eastern Samar; Tayabas, Quezon; Tabuk, Kalinga; Bayugan, Agusan del Sur; Batac, Ilocos Norte; Mati, Davao Oriental; Guihulngan, Negros Oriental; Cabadbaran, Agusan del Norte; El Salvador, Misamis Oriental; Carcar, Cebu and Naga, Cebu lost their cityhood status after the Supreme Court filed by League of Cities of the Philippines declares the respective cityhood laws unconstitutional.
- November 19 – The House Committee on Public Order and Safety launch its own investigation into the "euro generals". Nueva Ecija Representative Rodolfo Antonino, panel chairman, said that the panel has sent out invitations to all police officers who went to Russia, retired national Police comptroller Eliseo de la Paz and Local Governments Secretary Ronaldo Puno. Also invited were Budget and Management Secretary Rolando Andaya and a senior representative from the Commission on Audit. The panel is also reviewing reports of the Philippine National Police and the Napolcom.

== Holidays ==
On November 13, 2002, Republic Act No. 9177 declares Eidul Fitr as a regular holiday. The EDSA Revolution Anniversary was proclaimed since 2002 as a special non-working holiday. Note that in the list, holidays in bold are "regular holidays" and those in italics are "nationwide special days".

- January 1 – **New Year's Day**
- February 25 – EDSA Revolution Anniversary
- March 20 – **Maundy Thursday**
- March 21 – **Good Friday**
- April 9 – **Araw ng Kagitingan (Day of Valor)**
- May 1 – **Labor Day**
- June 12 – **Independence Day**
- August 21 – Ninoy Aquino Day
- August 25 – **National Heroes Day**
- October 1 – **Eid al-Fitr**
- November 1 – All Saints Day
- November 30 – **Bonifacio Day**
- December 25 – **Christmas**
- December 30 – **Rizal Day**
- December 31 – Last Day of the Year

In addition, several other places observe local holidays, such as the foundation of their town. These are also "special days."

== Sports ==
- March 15, Boxing – Manny Pacquiao becomes the Ring Magazine and WBC super featherweight champion as he defeats Juan Manuel Márquez by split decision.
- June 28, Boxing – Manny Pacquiao wins against David Díaz via knockout in the ninth round to win the WBC lightweight title.
- August 8–24, Multi-Sport Event – The Philippines competes at the 2008 Summer Olympics in Beijing, China. The country is represented by 15 athletes, who competed in 17 events across 8 sports.
- September 25, Basketball – The Ateneo Blue Eagles wins defeating the De La Salle Green Archers 2–0 in their final series to win their fourth men's title in the UAAP Championships.
- September 29, Basketball – The San Beda Red Lions wins defeating the JRU Heavy Bombers 2–1 in their final series to win their third men's title in the NCAA Championships.
- December 6, Boxing – Manny Pacquiao defeats Oscar De La Hoya after eight rounds in a fight billed as The Dream Match. When De La Hoya couldn't answer the bell for the ninth round, it was officially a Technical knockout.

== Entertainment and culture ==
- May 11 – Miss Philippines Earth 2008, the 8th edition of Miss Philippines Earth pageant, is held at Crowne Plaza Galleria, Ortigas Center, Manila. Miss Karla Paula Henry of Cebu wins the pageant.
- November 9 – Miss Earth 2008 is hosted by the Philippines at Clark Expo Amphitheater in Angeles City. Karla Henry of the Philippines wins the pageant.

=== Concerts ===
- April 3 – Toto live at the Araneta Coliseum
- November 29 – Christopher Cross and Workshy live at the Araneta Coliseum
- August 14 – Panic! at the Disco live at the Araneta Coliseum

== Births ==
- January – Eldrew Yulo, gymnast
- January 24 – Chlaui Malayao, actress
- July 11 – Krystal Mejes, actress
- July 31 – Raikko Mateo, actor
- September 7 – Charlie Fleming, actress
- September 12 – Nina Mathelus, footballer
- November 7 – John Philip Bughaw, dancer and actor
- November 10 – Caprice Cayetano, actress

== Deaths ==
- January 15 – Eduardo Hontiveros, Jesuit composer and musician (b. 1923)
- January 28 – Crisologo Abines, former Congressman, 2nd District of Cebu (b. 1947)
- February 2 – Billy Balbastro, entertainment columnist and DZMM anchor (b. 1940)
- February 4 – Larry Cruz, restaurateur, founder of LJC Restaurant Group (b. 1941)
- February 8 – Victor Dominguez, incumbent Congressman, Lone District, Mountain Province (b. 1938)
- February 22 – Gilberto Teodoro, Sr., former SSS Administrator and father of Defense Secretary Gilbert Teodoro (b. 1927)
- March 10 – Galo Ador, Jr., Filipino Komiks writer (b. 1969)
- March 17 – Rafael Recto, former Batangas Assemblyman and political scion (b. 1931)
- March 28 – Nemesio Prudente, former PUP president and political prisoner (b. 1927)
- April 14 – Olivia Cenizal, film actress (b. 1926)
- April 16 – Lucia "Aling Lucing" Cunanan, inventor of sisig (b. 1928)
- April 19 – Lou Salvador, Jr., film actor (b. 1941)
- April 23 – Loreto Paras-Sulit, writer of short fiction (b. 1908)
- May 8 – Jose Feria, retired Supreme Court Associate Justice (b. 1917)
- May 16 – Henry Canoy, founder of Radio Mindanao Network; grandson of ABS-CBN reporter Jeff Canoy (b. 1923)
- May 20 – Crispin Beltran, incumbent congressman and labor leader (b. 1933)
- May 26:
  - Dolly Aglay, journalist with Reuters and Philippine Star (b. 1966)
  - Howlin' Dave, radio disc jockey (b. 1955)
- May 29 – Romeo Brawner, incumbent COMELEC Commissioner (b. 1935)
- June 7
  - Rudy Fernandez, Rodolfo Valentino Padilla Fernandez Filipino actor (b. March 16, 1952)
  - Danilo Lagbas, incumbent Congressman (b. 1952)
- June 24 – Erlinda Espiritu, lawyer and first Filipino woman to graduate from Harvard University (b. 1925)
- July 22 – Gilbert Perez, movie and TV director (b. 1959)
- August 16 – Lucrecia Kasilag, National Artist of the Philippines (b. 1918)
- August 28:
  - Mang Pandoy, street vendor and media icon (b. 1945)
  - Zorayda Sanchez, film and TV comedian (b. 1952)
- September 1 – Dely Magpayo, radio host best known as Tia Dely (b. 1920)
- September 12 – Pacita Madrigal-Warns, former Senator (b. 1915)
- September 26 – Cirio H. Santiago, film director (b. 1936)
- October 13 – Khryss Adalia, film and television director (b. 1946)
- October 18 – Alfredo E. Evangelista, archaeologist, discovered the Laguna Copper Plate (b. 1926)
- November 27 – Armand Fabella, Secretary of Education (1992–94), president of Jose Rizal University (b. 1930)
- December 4 – Manuel Yan, former AFP Chief of Staff and diplomat; grandfather of the late Rico Yan (b. 1920)
- December 7 – Marky Cielo, StarStruck 3's Ultimate Male Survivor and Ultimate Soul Survivor (b. 1988)
- December 10 – Didith Reyes, singer (b. 1948)
- December 23 – Narciso Bernardo, basketball player and Olympian (b. 1937)
- December 24 – Ricardo Manapat, author & director of the National Archives (b. 1953)
