= 2008 in Philippine television =

The following is a list of events affecting Philippine television in 2008. Events listed include television show debuts, finales, cancellations, and channel launches, closures and rebrandings, as well as information about controversies and carriage disputes.

== Events ==
=== January ===
- January 1:
  - All of Solar's channels have ceased to air on Sky Cable, the Philippines' largest cable company. An insider claims that these troubles with SkyCable started when boxing champ Manny Pacquiao, whose fights Solar Entertainment has the exclusive right to air and distribute, moved from ABS-CBN, a sister company of Sky, to rival GMA. However, Solar signed a deal with local terrestrial channels ABC, RPN, SBN and RJTV for block-time programming, ETC, 2nd Avenue and C/S programming are seen on terrestrial TV. Currently, ETC shows can be seen on SBN and 2nd Avenue on RJTV on a test broadcast basis, while C/S will be seen on RPN.
  - ETC ceased to air over Sky Cable as a channel on its own right. However, as part of block-time agreements with various terrestrial channels, ETC carried some of its programs over Southern Broadcasting Network Channel 21, a terrestrial UHF TV Station in Metro Manila and selected cities in the Philippines.
- January 5: Comedian Ruben Gonzaga wins the second season of Pinoy Big Brother: Celebrity Edition.

=== May ===
- May 5: The 4th originating station of Kapuso Network started airing is GMA Dagupan, which covers Pangasinan, Tarlac, Nueva Ecija, Aurora, Zambales, Pampanga, Bulacan, Bataan, Benguet, La Union, Abra, Ifugao and Mountain Province after the establishment of Cebu, Iloilo and Davao together with the launching of Balitang Amianan (now One North Central Luzon).
- May 11: Miss Philippines Earth 2008, the 8th edition of Miss Philippines Earth pageant, was held at Crowne Plaza Galleria, Ortigas Center, Manila, Philippines. Miss Karla Henry of Cebu won the pageant.

=== June ===
- June 7: 18-year-old Ejay Falcon wins the second season of Pinoy Big Brother: Teen Edition.

=== August ===
- August 8: After 16 years of broadcast, ABC 5 ended its commercial operations on Friday evening at 22:00 (10:00 pm).
- August 9: at 19:00 (7:00 pm) local time, ABC 5 was rebranded as TV5 and launched its new programs. However, despite the name change, the corporate name will still be Associated Broadcasting Company and Tonyboy Cojuangco will remain its CEO.
- August 17: Gretchen Espina wins the first season of Pinoy Idol.

=== September ===
- September 14 - Laarni Lozada emerged as the Grand Star Dreamer of Pinoy Dream Academy season 2
- September 25 – The Ateneo de Manila University Blue Eagles clinched the UAAP Season 71 men's basketball title after defeating their archrivals De La Salle University Green Archers 2–0 in game 2 of the best-of-three finals series held at the Smart Araneta Coliseum in Quezon City. This was their 4th basketball championship title since they last won in UAAP Season 65 in 2002.

=== October ===
- October 1 - ABS-CBN unveils the TV plug "Beyond Television", describing its transformation from a small television network in October 23, 1953 into a full-fledged media conglomerate with businesses beyond television.
- October 5 - Philip Cesar Nadela emerged as the Little Grand Star Dreamer of Pinoy Dream Academy: Little Dreamers.
- October 17: GMA Network opens their new studio complex which was known as the new GMA Network Studios Annex. The opening ceremony is in a red-carpet premiere. The new studio's inaugural is being part of the network's 58th anniversary, the presentation is titled Experience GMA: 58 Years of Glorious Television.

=== November ===
- November 3: Anthony Solis wins the 1 million pesos of Kapamilya, Deal or No Deal.
- November 9: Miss Earth 2008 was hosted by the Philippines at Clark Expo Amphitheater in Angeles City, Philippines. Karla Henry of the Philippines won the pageant.
- November 17: Rey Beltran wins the 1.1 million pesos of Kapamilya, Deal or No Deal.
- November 25: Aiko Melendez and Candy Pangilinan win the 1 million pesos of Kapamilya, Deal or No Deal.

=== December ===
- December 1: Jhaphet Flordeliza wins the 1 million pesos of Kapamilya, Deal or No Deal.
- December 11: Arnel Pineda of Journey wins the 1 million pesos of Kapamilya, Deal or No Deal.

== Premieres ==
| Date | Show |
|---|---|
| January 1 | Coffee Prince on GMA 7 |
| January 1 | Late Show with David Letterman on ETC |
| January 1 | The Tonight Show with Jay Leno on Jack TV |
| January 1 | Late Night with Conan O'Brien on Jack TV |
| January 5 | Kasangga Mo ang Langit on IBC 13 |
| January 5 | Saturday Night Live on Jack TV |
| January 5 | Biyaheng Langit on IBC 13 |
| January 7 | Marhay na Aga Kapamilya on ABS-CBN TV-11 Naga |
| January 7 | Patayin sa Sindak si Barbara on ABS-CBN 2 |
| January 12 | Astigs on ABS-CBN 2 |
| January 14 | Wheel of Fortune on ABS-CBN 2 |
| January 16 | American Idol season 7 on Q 11 |
| January 19 | Wanted: Perfect Husband on ABS-CBN 2 |
| January 21 | Maging Akin Ka Lamang on GMA 7 |
| January 21 | Absolute Boy on Q 11 |
| January 26 | Volta on ABS-CBN 2 |
| January 28 | Hana Yori Dango II on GMA 7 |
| January 28 | Kung Fu Kids on ABS-CBN 2 |
| January 28 | Lobo on ABS-CBN 2 |
| January 28 | Palos on ABS-CBN 2 |
| February 4 | Shuriken School on ABS-CBN 2 |
| February 7 | E.S.P. on GMA 7 |
| February 9 | Dear Boys on ABS-CBN 2 |
| February 11 | Joaquin Bordado on GMA 7 |
| February 18 | Marrying a Millionaire on ABS-CBN 2 |
| February 18 | Devil Beside Me on GMA 7 |
| March 3 | Kaputol ng Isang Awit on GMA 7 |
| March 3 | Dating Now on GMA 7 |
| March 3 | Julio at Julia: Kambal ng Tadhana on ABS-CBN 2 |
| March 10 | The Legend on GMA 7 |
| March 16 | Chill Spot on ETC (SBN 21) |
| March 17 | Keeping Up with the Kardashians on ETC (SBN 21) |
| March 17 | Adventures of Tom Sawyer on ABS-CBN 2 |
| March 17 | Mga Munting Pangarap ni Romeo on ABS-CBN 2 |
| March 23 | Pinoy Big Brother: Teen Edition Plus on ABS-CBN 2 |
| March 23 | Gaby's Xtraordinary Files on ABS-CBN 2 |
| March 24 | El Cuerpo on ABS-CBN 2 |
| March 24 | Hana Kimi (Taiwanese version) on ABS-CBN 2 |
| March 24 | Hana Kimi (Japanese version) on GMA 7 |
| March 24 | Babangon Ako't Dudurugin Kita on GMA 7 |
| March 24 | Matanglawin on ABS-CBN 2 |
| March 24 | Angie Girl on ABS-CBN 2 |
| March 24 | Little Women on ABS-CBN 2 |
| March 24 | Lalabel, the Magical Girl on Q 11 |
| March 25 | TMZ on TV on Jack TV |
| March 29 | I Am KC on ABS-CBN 2 |
| March 31 | Lovers on ABS-CBN 2 |
| March 31 | Daisy Siete: Prince Charming and the Seven Maids on GMA 7 |
| April 5 | Pinoy Idol on GMA 7 |
| April 6 | Mag TV Na on All ABS-CBN Regional channels |
| April 6 | Tasya Fantasya on GMA 7 |
| April 7 | Pamahaw Espesyal on ABS-CBN TV-2 Cagayan de Oro |
| April 7 | Batingaw on NBN 4 |
| April 7 | Money Matters on NBN 4 |
| April 7 | NBN Sports on NBN 4 |
| April 13 | Jollitown on GMA 7 |
| April 14 | GoBingo on GMA 7 |
| April 14 | Lady Lady on Q 11 |
| April 21 | The Singing Bee on ABS-CBN 2 |
| April 21 | Da Big Show on GMA 7 |
| April 21 | Cuore on ABS-CBN 2 |
| April 26 | Komiks Presents: Kapitan Boom on ABS-CBN 2 |
| April 28 | Dyesebel on GMA 7 |
| April 28 | Maligno on ABS-CBN 2 |
| May 5 | Quickfire on Q 11 |
| May 5 | Balitang Amianan on GMA Dagupan |
| May 5 | The Price Is Right on 2nd Avenue |
| May 12 | Magdusa Ka on GMA 7 |
| May 12 | Hot Guys Who Cook on ETC (SBN 21) |
| May 12 | New York Fashion Week: Catwalk Review on ETC (SBN 21) |
| May 15 | Songbird on GMA 7 |
| May 17 | Fantastic Children on ABS-CBN 2 |
| May 17 | Power Rangers Mystic Force on ABS-CBN 2 |
| May 19 | Witch Yoo Hee on GMA 7 |
| May 19 | The Adventures of Huckleberry Finn on ABS-CBN 2 |
| May 26 | Ligaw Na Bulaklak on ABS-CBN 2 |
| May 26 | My Girl on ABS-CBN 2 |
| May 26 | Akuei & Gatchinpo on ABS-CBN 2 |
| May 31 | Busog Lusog on ABS-CBN 2 |
| June 2 | Romantic Princess on ABS-CBN 2 |
| June 2 | Dalja's Spring on GMA 7 |
| June 9 | My Melody on Q 11 |
| June 14 | Pinoy Dream Academy season 2 on ABS-CBN 2 |
| June 15 | Bakbakan on ABS-CBN 2 |
| June 21 | E! True Hollywood Story on 2nd Avenue |
| June 23 | Gaano Kadalas ang Minsan on GMA 7 |
| June 23 | Marimar on GMA 7 |
| June 30 | Artificial Beauty on ABS-CBN 2 |
| June 30 | Ako si Kim Samsoon on GMA 7 |
| June 30 | Digimon Frontier on ABS-CBN 2 |
| July 5 | Wonder Mom on ABS-CBN 2 |
| July 5 | That's My Job on ABC 5 |
| July 6 | Pinoy Dream Academy: Little Dreamers on ABS-CBN 2 |
| July 7 | Hello My Lady on GMA 7 |
| July 10 | Married Away on ETC (SBN 21) |
| July 14 | Iisa Pa Lamang on ABS-CBN 2 |
| July 14 | Codename: Asero on GMA 7 |
| July 14 | Cinderella on ABS-CBN 2 |
| July 14 | Sally the Witch on Q 11 |
| July 20 | Dear Friend on GMA 7 |
| July 21 | Peter Pan and Wendy on ABS-CBN 2 |
| July 21 | Daisy Siete: Vaklushii on GMA 7 |
| July 21 | Bitag Live on UNTV 37 |
| July 21 | Spotlight on UNTV 37 |
| July 21 | Bantay OFW on UNTV 37 |
| July 22 | Alarma on UNTV 37 |
| July 22 | Munting Pangarap on UNTV 37 |
| July 23 | Bread N' Butter on UNTV 37 |
| July 24 | Checkpoint on UNTV 37 |
| July 24 | Go, NGO! on UNTV 37 |
| July 25 | Istorya on UNTV 37 |
| July 25 | Get It Straight with Jay and Willie on UNTV 37 |
| July 26 | Galaxy Adventures of Oz on Q 11 |
| July 26 | Showbiz Overload on UNTV 37 |
| July 27 | Barangay Hoopsters on UNTV 37 |
| July 28 | Naimbag Nga Morning Kapamilya on ABS-CBN TV-3 Baguio |
| July 28 | Las Tontas on ABS-CBN 2 |
| July 28 | Kapamilya, Deal or No Deal on ABS-CBN 2 |
| July 29 | They Kiss Again on ABS-CBN 2 |
| July 29 | The Game on ETC (SBN 21) |
| July 30 | Project Runway Philippines on ETC (SBN 21) |
| July 31 | Shear Genius on ETC (SBN 21) |
| August 9 | Ka-Blog! on GMA 7 |
| August 9 | Komiks Presents: Varga on ABS-CBN 2 |
| August 9 | 5 Max Movies on TV5 |
| August 9 | All Hot Music on TV5 |
| August 10 | The Word Exposed on TV5 |
| August 10 | Humayo’t Ihayag on TV5 |
| August 10 | Shakugan no Shana on TV5 |
| August 10 | Yamato Nadeshiko Shichi Henge on TV5 |
| August 10 | Love Monkey on TV5 |
| August 10 | Pulis! Pulis! on TV5 |
| August 11 | Sweet Spy on GMA 7 |
| August 11 | Dyosa on ABS-CBN 2 |
| August 11 | I-Go Youngster on TV5 |
| August 11 | Rebelde on TV5 |
| August 11 | Juicy! on TV5 |
| August 11 | Shock Attack on TV5 |
| August 11 | Untamed Beauties on TV5 |
| August 11 | Midnight DJ on TV5 |
| August 11 | TEN: The Evening News on TV5 |
| August 11 | i-News on Net 25 |
| August 11 | Mysmatch on TV5 |
| August 11 | Barney & Friends on TV5 |
| August 11 | Bratz on TV5 |
| August 11 | Pingu on TV5 |
| August 11 | Witchblade on TV5 |
| August 12 | 3R on TV5 |
| August 12 | Lovebooks Presents on TV5 |
| August 12 | I Am Ninoy on TV5 |
| August 13 | Ogags on TV5 |
| August 13 | Toyz on TV5 |
| August 14 | Rakista on TV5 |
| August 14 | Obra: Katrina Halili on GMA 7 |
| August 14 | Travel on a Shoestring on TV5 |
| August 14 | Bob the Builder on TV5 |
| August 15 | Lokomoko on TV5 |
| August 15 | Batang X: The Next Generation on TV5 |
| August 16 | Mustard TV on TV5 |
| August 16 | Inside The Fishbowl on TV5 |
| August 16 | Lipgloss on TV5 |
| August 16 | Talentadong Pinoy on TV5 |
| August 16 | Golden Bride on TV5 |
| August 16 | Oh Su Jung vs. Karl on TV5 |
| August 16 | Water Boys on TV5 |
| August 16 | Temptation Island on TV5 |
| August 17 | MP3 on TV5 |
| August 17 | My MVP on TV5 |
| August 18 | Ripley's Believe It or Not! on GMA 7 |
| August 18 | Si Mary at Ang Lihim ng Hardin on ABS-CBN 2 |
| August 18 | Cardcaptor Sakura on Q 11 |
| August 19 | World Records on GMA 7 |
| August 20 | Masquerade on GMA 7 |
| August 22 | Philippines Scariest Challenge on TV5 |
| August 23 | Celebrity Duets (season 2) on GMA 7 |
| August 24 | Tok! Tok! Tok! Isang Milyon Pasok (season 2) on GMA 7 |
| August 25 | My Husband's Woman on GMA 7 |
| August 27 | HushHush on TV5 |
| September 1 | Una Kang Naging Akin on GMA 7 |
| September 1 | Be Strong, Geum-soon! on GMA 7 |
| September 2 | Chelsea Lately on ETC (SBN 21) |
| September 2 | TMZ on TV on ETC (SBN 21) |
| September 8 | I Love Betty La Fea on ABS-CBN 2 |
| September 8 | Three Dads with One Mommy on ABS-CBN 2 |
| September 8 | Digimon Savers on ABS-CBN 2 |
| September 11 | Obra: JC de Vera on GMA 7 |
| September 12 | Pussycat Dolls Present: Girlicious on ETC (SBN 21) |
| September 13 | Teamo Supremo on ABS-CBN 2 |
| September 15 | Basketball Tribe on ABS-CBN 2 |
| September 15 | Kahit Isang Saglit on ABS-CBN 2 |
| September 15 | Survivor Philippines on GMA 7 |
| September 15 | Robin Hood on ABS-CBN 2 |
| September 20 | Winx Club on ABS-CBN 2 |
| September 20 | Skyland on ABS-CBN 2 |
| September 21 | Fantastic Four on ABS-CBN 2 |
| September 22 | Pushing Daisies on Jack TV |
| September 22 | Kalye, Mga Kwento ng Lansangan on ABS-CBN 2 |
| September 26 | Survivor: Gabon on Q 11 |
| September 27 | DoQmentaries on Q 11 |
| September 29 | House Life on Q 11 |
| October 2 | Case Unclosed on GMA 7 |
| October 4 | PBA on Solar Sports on C/S 9/Solar Sports/Basketball TV |
| October 4 | True Confections on Q 11 |
| October 5 | Your Song: My Only Hope on ABS-CBN 2 |
| October 6 | Sakurano on GMA 7 |
| October 6 | Ang Alamat ni Snow White on ABS-CBN 2 |
| October 9 | Obra: Sunshine Dizon on GMA 7 |
| October 11 | Banana Split on ABS-CBN 2 |
| October 11 | Desert Punk on GMA 7 |
| October 13 | LaLola on GMA 7 |
| October 13 | Family Feud on GMA 7 |
| October 18 | Komiks Presents: Tiny Tony on ABS-CBN 2 |
| October 20 | Gagambino on GMA 7 |
| October 21 | Inside Edition on ETC (SBN 21) |
| October 27 | Pieta on ABS-CBN 2 |
| October 27 | TV Patrol Ilocos on ABS-CBN TV-7 Laoag |
| October 27 | Street Fighter on GMA 7 |
| October 29 | Counterpoint with Secretary Salvador Panelo on IBC 13 |
| November 3 | Why Why Love on ABS-CBN 2 |
| November 3 | Rosalinda on GMA 7 |
| November 6 | Obra: Iza Calzado on GMA 7 |
| November 8 | Batang Bibbo! on GMA 7 |
| November 8 | Kakasa Ka Ba sa Grade 5? (season 2) on GMA 7 |
| November 10 | Pinoy Fear Factor on ABS-CBN 2 |
| November 10 | Saan Darating ang Umaga? on GMA 7 |
| November 10 | Code Geass on TV5 |
| November 10 | Mai HiME on TV5 |
| November 10 | Noein on TV5 |
| November 10 | Shakugan no Shana Second on TV5 |
| November 17 | Luna Mystika on GMA 7 |
| November 17 | La traición on ABS-CBN 2 |
| November 17 | Eyeshield 21 on ABS-CBN 2 |
| November 17 | GetBackers on ABS-CBN 2 |
| November 17 | Julio at Julia: Kambal ng Tadhana on ABS-CBN 2 |
| November 20 | The Girls of the Playboy Mansion on ETC (SBN 21) |
| November 21 | Arekup Video Zonkers on TV5 |
| November 23 | Everybody Hapi on TV5 |
| November 24 | OMG on TV5 |
| November 24 | Ha Ha Hayop on TV5 |
| November 25 | Kiddie Kwela on TV5 |
| November 27 | Rescue Mission on TV5 |
| December 1 | Eva Fonda on ABS-CBN 2 |
| December 2 | Full Force Nature on GMA 7 |
| December 8 | Money War on GMA 7 |
| December 15 | Precious Time on ABS-CBN 2 |
| December 15 | Azumanga Daioh on TV5 |
| December 15 | Black Blood Brothers on TV5 |
| December 20 | Komiks Presents: Dragonna on ABS-CBN 2 |
| December 22 | Wanted Perfect Family on GMA 7 |
| December 22 | Mr. Bean: The Animated Series on ABS-CBN 2 |
| December 22 | Power Rangers Mystic Force on ABS-CBN 2 |
| December 29 | Coyote Ragtime Show on TV5 |

=== Unknown dates ===
- April: Mixing with the Best on 2nd Avenue
- August: Balita Ngayon on TV5
  - News Advisory on TV5
  - Balita Ngayon Weekend on TV5
- September: Batangas News Patrol on ABS-CBN TV-10 Batangas
- November:
  - Elmo's World on TV5
  - Global Grover on TV5
  - Play with Me Sesame on TV5
  - Postman Pat on TV5
- December: Thomas & Friends on TV5

=== Unknown ===
- Del Monte Got2BFit Challenge on ABS-CBN 2
- Palmolive Shining Circle Of 10 Batch 2008 on ABS-CBN 2
- Harapan on ABS-CBN 2
- Busog Lusog on ABS-CBN 2
- Tagamends on IBC 13
- Asin at Ilaw on IBC 13
- Lucida DS: United Shelter Health Show on IBC 13
- Talk Toons on IBC 13
- @ Ur Serbis on NBN 4
- America Atbp. on NBN 4
- Balitalakay on NBN 4
- Business @ 10 on NBN 4
- Heart To Heart Talk on NBN 4
- Mama Mary Holy Mass on NBN 4
- Meet the Press on NBN 4
- Music and Memories on NBN 4
- Neighbours on NBN 4
- Pananaw on NBN 4
- Perspectives on NBN 4
- People's Government Mobile Action on NBN 4
- Radyo Bandido sa Telebisyon on NBN 4
- Republic Service on NBN 4
- Takip Silip on NBN 4
- Jungle TV on GMA 7
- Hayate the Combat Butler on GMA 7
- Bakugan Battle Brawlers on GMA 7
- A Round Of Golf on C/S 9
- C/S Blockbusters on C/S 9
- Fashionistas by Heart on Q 11
- Fit & Fab on Q 11
- One Proud Mama on Q 11
- Philippine Explorer on Q 11
- Puso Mo sa Amerika on Q 11
- The Debutante on Q 11
- Discover Germany on Net 25
- Global 3000 on Net 25
- Home Page on Net 25
- In Good Shape on Net 25
- Light of Salvation on Net 25
- 3rd Row on 2nd Avenue 29
- Value Vision on ZOE TV 33
- Winner TV Shopping on ZOE TV 33
- TV Patrol Northwestern Mindanao on ABS-CBN TV-9 Pagadian

== Returning or renamed programs ==
| Show | Last aired | Retitled as/Season/Notes | Channel | Return date |
|---|---|---|---|---|
| Kasangga Mo ang Langit | 2007 (RPN) | Same | IBC | January 5 |
| Biyaheng Langit | 2007 (RPN) | Same | IBC | January 5 |
| NewsWatch | 2007 | Same | RPN | January 7 |
| Wheel of Fortune | 2002 (ABC) | Same | ABS-CBN | January 14 |
| American Idol | 2007 (ABC) | Same (season 7) | Q | January 16 |
| Philippine Basketball League | 2007 (RPN / Basketball TV; season 24: "V-Go Extreme Energy Drink Cup") | Same (season 24: "Lipovitan Amino Sports Drink Cup") | IBC | February 23 |
| Philippine Basketball Association | 2008 (season 33: Philippine Cup) | Same (season 33: Fiesta Conference) | ABC | March 29 |
| Philippine Idol | 2006 (ABC) | Pinoy Idol | GMA | April 5 |
| GoBingo | 1999 | Same | GMA | April 14 |
| Pinoy Dream Academy | 2006 | Same (season 2) | ABS-CBN | June 14 |
| National Collegiate Athletic Association | 2008 | Same (season 84) | Studio 23 | June 28 |
| University Athletic Association of the Philippines | 2008 | Same (season 71) | Studio 23 | July 5 |
| Kapamilya, Deal or No Deal | 2008 | Same (season 3) | ABS-CBN | July 28 |
| 3R | 2006 (Q) | Same | TV5 | August 12 |
| O-gag | 1998 (ABC) | Ogags | TV5 | August 13 |
| Celebrity Duets: Philippine Edition | 2007 | Same (season 2) | GMA | August 23 |
| Tok! Tok! Tok! Isang Milyon Pasok | 2008 | Same (season 2) | GMA | August 24 |
| Betty La Fea | 2003 (GMA) | I Love Betty La Fea | ABS-CBN | September 8 |
| Philippine Basketball Association | 2008 (TV5; season 33: Fiesta Conference) | Same (season 34: Philippine Cup) | C/S / Basketball TV | October 4 |
| Family Feud | 2002 (ABC) | Same | GMA | October 13 |
| Kakasa Ka Ba sa Grade 5? | 2008 | Same (season 2) | GMA | November 8 |
| Philippine Basketball League | 2008 (IBC; season 24: "Lipovitan Amino Sports Drink Cup") | Same (season 25: "PG Flex Linoleum Cup") | C/S | November 8 |
| National Basketball Association | 2008 (ABC) | Same (2008–09 season) | C/S | November |
| The Main Event | 2003 | Same | IBC | Unknown |
| Judy Abbott | 2002 (ABS-CBN) | My Daddy Long Legs | Q | Unknown |
| Balita Ngayon | 1972/1986 (ABS-CBN) | —N/a | TV5 | Unknown |
| News Advisory | 2005 (ABS-CBN) | —N/a | TV5 | Unknown |

== Programs transferring networks ==
| Date | Show | No. of seasons | Moved from | Moved to |
|---|---|---|---|---|
| January 1 | Late Show with David Letterman | —N/a | Jack TV | ETC |
| January 1 | The Tonight Show with Jay Leno | —N/a | ETC | Jack TV |
| January 1 | Late Night with Conan O'Brien | —N/a | ETC | Jack TV |
| January 5 | Kasangga Mo ang Langit | —N/a | RPN (now C/S) | IBC |
| January 5 | Biyaheng Langit | —N/a | RPN (now C/S) | IBC |
| January 5 | Saturday Night Live | —N/a | ETC | Jack TV |
| January 14 | Wheel of Fortune | —N/a | ABC (now TV5) | ABS-CBN |
| February 23 | Philippine Basketball League | 24 | RPN (now C/S) / Basketball TV | IBC |
| March 10 | Sabrina: The Animated Series | —N/a | ABC (now TV5) | Q |
| April 5 | Pinoy Idol | —N/a | ABC (now TV5) (as Philippine Idol) | GMA (as Pinoy Idol) |
| August 11 | Barney & Friends | —N/a | ABS-CBN (season 8 only) | TV5 |
| August 11 | The Adventures of Jimmy Neutron, Boy Genius | —N/a | Studio 23 | TV5 |
| August 12 | 3R | —N/a | Q | TV5 |
| September 2 | Chelsea Lately | 2 | Jack TV | ETC |
| September 8 | Betty La Fea | —N/a | GMA (as the original title) | ABS-CBN (as I Love Betty La Fea) |
| October 4 | Philippine Basketball Association | 34 | TV5 | C/S / Basketball TV |
| October 13 | Family Feud | —N/a | ABC (now TV5) | GMA |
| October 21 | Inside Edition | —N/a | 2nd Avenue | ETC |
| November | National Basketball Association | —N/a | ABC (now TV5) | C/S |
| November | Postman Pat | —N/a | Studio 23 | TV5 |
| November 3 | Rosalinda | —N/a | ABS-CBN / Q | GMA |
| November 8 | Philippine Basketball League | 25 | IBC | C/S |
| Unknown | Judy Abbott | —N/a | ABS-CBN | Q (as My Daddy Long Legs) |
| Unknown | Lucida DS: United Shelter Health Show | —N/a | ABC (now TV5) | IBC |
| Unknown | Balita Ngayon | —N/a | ABS-CBN | TV5 |
| Unknown | News Advisory | —N/a | ABS-CBN | TV5 |

== Finales ==
- January 4:
  - RPN NewsWatch Aksyon Balita (RPN 9)
  - RPN News Update (RPN 9)
- January 5:
  - Pinoy Big Brother: Celebrity Edition 2 (ABS-CBN 2)
  - Abt Ur Luv (ABS-CBN 2)
- January 11:
  - Kapamilya, Deal or No Deal (season 2) (ABS-CBN 2)
  - Sine Novela: Pasan Ko ang Daigdig (GMA 7)
  - RPN iWatch News (RPN 9)
- January 12: Hello Kitty's Furry Tale Theater (ABS-CBN 2)
- January 13: Boys Nxt Door (GMA 7)
- January 18:
  - Ysabella (ABS-CBN 2)
  - The Snow Queen (Q 11)
- January 19: Sabado Movie Specials (ABS-CBN 2)
- January 25:
  - Lastikman (ABS-CBN 2)
  - Patayin sa Sindak si Barbara (ABS-CBN 2)
- February 1: Remi, Nobody's Girl (ABS-CBN 2)
- February 3: Air Gear (ABS-CBN 2)
- February 8: Zaido: Pulis Pangkalawakan (GMA 7)
- February 15: Spring Waltz (ABS-CBN 2)
- February 22: Absolute Boy (Q 11)
- February 29:
  - My Only Love (GMA 7)
  - Come Back Soon-Ae (GMA 7)
  - Whammy! Push Your Luck (GMA 7)
  - Trapp Family Singers (ABS-CBN 2)
- March 14:
  - Marimar (GMA 7)
  - Cedie, Ang Munting Prinsipe (ABS-CBN 2)
  - Shuriken School (ABS-CBN 2)
- March 15: Volta (ABS-CBN 2)
- March 16: Ka-Pete Na! Totally Outrageous Behavior (ABS-CBN 2)
- March 17: Noypi, Ikaw Ba ‘To? (ABS-CBN 2)
- March 19:
  - Coffee Prince (GMA 7)
  - Hana Yori Dango II (GMA 7)
  - Pinoy Movie Hits (ABS-CBN 2)
  - Zorro: The Sword and the Rose (ABS-CBN 2)
  - Julio at Julia: Kambal ng Tadhana (ABS-CBN 2)
  - Marrying a Millionaire (ABS-CBN 2)
  - Swiss Family Robinson (ABS-CBN 2)
- March 23: Love Spell (ABS-CBN 2)
- March 28:
  - Maging Sino Ka Man: Ang Pagbabalik (ABS-CBN 2)
  - Daisy Siete: Ulingling (GMA 7)
- March 29: Kakasa Ka Ba sa Grade 5? (season 1) (GMA 7)
- March 30: Kapuso Sine Specials (GMA 7)
- April 4:
  - Teledyaryo Alas-Nuwebe (NBN 4)
  - Teledyaryo Alas-Dose (NBN 4)
  - Teledyaryo Primetime (NBN 4)
  - Teledyaryo Final Edition (NBN 4)
  - Teledyaryo Sports (NBN 4)
  - Teledyaryo Panlalawigan (NBN 4)
- April 11: Dating Now (GMA 7)
- April 18:
  - Devil Beside Me (GMA 7)
  - Angie Girl (ABS-CBN 2)
- April 19:
  - 1 vs. 100 (ABS-CBN 2)
  - I Am KC (ABS-CBN 2)
- April 25:
  - Kamandag (GMA 7)
  - Kung Fu Kids (ABS-CBN 2)
  - Palos (ABS-CBN 2)
- April 28: House of Hoops (ABC 5)
- May 8: E.S.P. (GMA 7)
- May 9: Maging Akin Ka Lamang (GMA 7)
- May 10:
  - Star Magic Presents (ABS-CBN 2)
  - Astigs (ABS-CBN 2)
- May 11:
  - Dear Boys (ABS-CBN 2)
  - Eureka Seven (ABS-CBN 2)
- May 16:
  - Hana Kimi (Japanese version) (GMA 7)
  - Adventures of Tom Sawyer (ABS-CBN 2)
  - Lady Lady (Q 11)
  - Lalabel, the Magical Girl (Q 11)
- May 18: Tok! Tok! Tok! Isang Milyon Pasok (season 1) (GMA 7)
- May 22: American Idol season 7 (Q 11)
- May 23:
  - Prinsesa ng Banyera (ABS-CBN 2)
  - Maligno (ABS-CBN 2)
  - Little Women (ABS-CBN 2)
- May 24: Sirit (ABS-CBN 2)
- May 29: The Legend (GMA 7)
- May 30: Hana Kimi (Taiwanese version) (ABS-CBN 2)
- June 7: Pinoy Big Brother: Teen Edition Plus (ABS-CBN 2)
- June 8: Gaby's Xtraordinary Files (ABS-CBN 2)
- June 13: Kaputol ng Isang Awit (GMA 7)
- June 26: Lovers (ABS-CBN 2)
- June 27:
  - Babangon Ako't Dudurugin Kita (GMA 7)
  - The Adventures of Huckleberry Finn (ABS-CBN 2)
- July 11:
  - Joaquin Bordado (GMA 7)
  - Lobo (ABS-CBN 2)
  - Akuei & Gatchinpo (ABS-CBN 2)
- July 13:
  - Tasya Fantasya (GMA 7)
  - Fantastic Children (ABS-CBN 2)
- July 18:
  - Bahala si Bitag (UNTV 37)
  - Daisy Siete: Prince Charming and the Seven Maids (GMA 7)
  - Cuore (ABS-CBN 2)
- July 19: Chika Mo, Chika Ko (UNTV 37)
- July 20:
  - Jollitown (GMA 7)
  - Hometown: Doon Po Sa Amin (UNTV 37)
  - Katha (UNTV 37)
  - Usapang Kristiyano (UNTV 37)
- July 25:
  - Romantic Princess (ABS-CBN 2)
  - Wheel of Fortune (ABS-CBN 2)
- August 1: Artificial Beauty (ABS-CBN 2)
- August 2:
  - Asenso Pinoy (ABC 5)
  - Amerika Atbp. (ABC 5)
  - Generation RX (ABC 5)
  - Look Who’s Cooking (ABC 5)
  - Teens (ABC 5)
  - That's My Job (ABC 5)
  - Wow Mali Express (ABC 5)
  - Saturday Night Blockbusters (ABC 5)
  - Record Breakers (ABC 5)
  - Komiks Presents: Kapitan Boom (ABS-CBN 2)
- August 3:
  - Family Rosary Crusade (ABC 5)
  - The Chaplet of the Divine Mercy (ABC 5)
  - The Meeting Place (ABC 5)
  - Word Made Flesh (ABC 5)
  - Signs & Wonders (ABC 5)
  - Ringside (ABC 5)
  - Light Talk (ABC 5)
- August 4:
  - S.O.S.: Stories of Survival (ABC 5)
  - Maximum Exposure (ABC 5)
- August 5:
  - Cinemalaya (ABC 5)
  - Mommy Elvie's Problematic Show (ABC 5)
- August 7:
  - PBA Classics (ABC 5)
  - Judge Bao (ABC 5)
- August 8:
  - Witch Yoo Hee (GMA 7)
  - Big News (ABC 5)
  - Net 25 Report (Net 25)
  - Sentro (ABC 5)
  - ABC News Alert (ABC 5)
  - Lucida DS: United Shelter Health Show (ABC 5)
  - Proactiv Solution (ABC 5)
  - ABCinema (ABC 5)
- August 9: Songbird (GMA 7)
- August 13: Kung Ako Ikaw (GMA 7)
- August 15:
  - Cinderella (ABS-CBN 2)
  - My Melody (Q 11)
- August 17: Pinoy Idol (GMA 7)
- August 20: PBA on TV5 (TV5)
- August 22: Dalja's Spring (GMA 7)
- August 24: Galaxy Adventures of Oz (Q 11)
- August 29:
  - Magdusa Ka (GMA 7)
  - Hello My Lady (GMA 7)
- August 30: Late Show with David Letterman (ETC on SBN 21)
- September 4: Obra: Katrina Halili (GMA 7)
- September 5:
  - My Girl (ABS-CBN 2)
  - Digimon Frontier (ABS-CBN 2)
  - Sally the Witch (Q 11)
- September 6: American Dragon: Jake Long (ABS-CBN 2)
- September 12: Peter Pan and Wendy (ABS-CBN 2)
- September 14:
  - Power Rangers Mystic Force (ABS-CBN 2)
  - School Rumble: Second Term (ABS-CBN 2)
- September 15: Harapan (ABS-CBN 2)
- September 19:
  - They Kiss Again (ABS-CBN 2)
  - Shakugan no Shana (TV5)
  - Witchblade (TV5)
- September 25: 100% Pinoy! (GMA 7)
- October 2: Obra: JC De Vera (GMA 7)
- October 3:
  - Sweet Spy (GMA 7)
  - Si Mary at Ang Lihim ng Hardin (ABS-CBN 2)
- October 4: That's My Doc (ABS-CBN 2)
- October 5: Pinoy Dream Academy: Little Dreamers (ABS-CBN 2)
- October 10:
  - Ako si Kim Samsoon (GMA 7)
  - GoBingo (GMA 7)
- October 11: Komiks Presents: Varga (ABS-CBN 2)
- October 17:
  - Dyesebel (GMA 7)
  - Daisy Siete: Vaklushii (GMA 7)
- October 24:
  - Ligaw na Bulaklak (ABS-CBN 2)
  - TV Patrol Laoag (ABS-CBN TV-7 Laoag)
- October 30: Obra: Sunshine Dizon (GMA 7)
- October 31:
  - They Kiss Again (ABS-CBN 2)
  - Marimar (GMA 7)
- November 2: Tok! Tok! Tok! Isang Milyon Pasok (season 2) (GMA 7)
- November 4: Lovebooks Presents (TV5)
- November 7:
  - Gaano Kadalas ang Minsan (GMA 7)
  - Iisa Pa Lamang (ABS-CBN 2)
  - Basketball Tribe (ABS-CBN 2)
- November 8: Celebrity Duets (season 2) (GMA 7)
- November 12: Project Runway Philippines season 1 (ETC on SBN 21)
- November 14:
  - Codename: Asero (GMA 7)
  - El Cuerpo (ABS-CBN 2)
  - Three Dads with One Mommy (ABS-CBN 2)
  - Batang X: The Next Generation (TV5)
  - Ang Alamat ni Snow White (ABS-CBN 2)
  - Digimon Savers (ABS-CBN 2)
  - Robin Hood (ABS-CBN 2)
- November 16:
  - My OFW Story (TV5)
  - Sunday Super Sine (Q 11)
- November 17: Pushing Daisies (season 1) (Jack TV)
- November 19: HushHush (TV5)
- November 20: Rakista (TV5)
- November 21: Cardcaptor Sakura (Q 11)
- November 25: World Records (GMA 7)
- November 27: Obra: Iza Calzado (GMA 7)
- December 5: My Husband's Woman (GMA 7)
- December 12:
  - Kahit Isang Saglit (ABS-CBN 2)
  - Code Geass (TV5)
  - Mai HiME (TV5)
  - Noein (TV5)
  - Shakugan no Shana Second (TV5)
- December 13: Komiks Presents: Tiny Tony (ABS-CBN 2)
- December 15: Survivor: Gabon (Q 11)
- December 19:
  - Una Kang Naging Akin (GMA 7)
  - Las Tontas (ABS-CBN 2)
  - Eyeshield 21 (ABS-CBN 2)
  - GetBackers (ABS-CBN 2)
  - Julio at Julia: Kambal ng Tadhana (ABS-CBN 2)
- December 26: Black Blood Brothers (TV5)
- December 27: Nuts Entertainment (GMA 7)

=== Unknown dates ===
- July: Da Big Show (GMA 7)

=== Unknown ===
- Del Monte Got2BFit Challenge (ABS-CBN 2)
- Palmolive Shining Circle Of 10 Batch 2008 (ABS-CBN 2)
- Pinoy Mano Mano: Celebrity Boxing Challenge (ABS-CBN 2)
- Serbis on the Go (IBC 13)
- Amerika Atbp. (IBC 13)
- Krusada Kontra Korupsyon (NBN 4, RPN 9, IBC 13)
- Ratsada E (IBC 13)
- Mommy Academy (IBC 13)
- IBCinema Nights (IBC 13)
- Primetime Sinemax (IBC 13)
- Talk Toons (IBC 13)
- Astig PBA (ABC 5)
- Buhay PBA (ABC 5)
- Community Mass on ABC ABC 5)
- EZ Shop (ABC 5)
- Family Land Children's Show (ABC 5)
- Island Flavors (ABC 5)
- Kapatid with Joel Mendez (ABC 5)
- Pool Showdown (ABC 5)
- Star sa Kusina (ABC 5)
- Text 2 Win (ABC 5)
- Three Minutes a Day with Fr. James Reuter, S.J. (ABC 5)
- Winner TV Shopping (ABC 5)
- W.O.W.: What's On Weekend (ABC 5)
- World Class Boxing (ABC 5)
- Ang Say ng Kabataan (A.S.K.) (NBN 4)
- Boses (NBN 4)
- Business @ 10 (NBN 4)
- Katapatan sa Watawat at Lipunan (K.A.W.A.L.) (NBN 4)
- Makabayang Doktor (NBN 4)
- Music and Memories (NBN 4)
- Radyo Bandido sa Telebisyon (NBN 4)
- Serbisyo Muna (NBN 4)
- Sing! Sing! (NBN 4)
- Talk Ko 'To! (NBN 4)
- Taas Noo, Bulakenyo! (NBN 4)
- Taas Noo, Pilipino! (NBN 4)
- Finishline (RPN 9)
- Kol TV (RPN 9)
- Shoot That Babe (RPN 9)
- Jungle TV (GMA 7)
- Combattler V (Q 11)
- Dahil sa Iyong Paglisan (Q 11)
- Elementar Gerad (Q 11)
- Final Fantasy: Unlimited (Q 11)
- Last Woman Standing (Q 11)
- Mga Waging Kuwento ng OFW (Q 11)
- Planet Q (Q 11)
- Puso Mo sa Amerika (Q 11)
- RX Men (Q 11)
- Sunday Super Sine (Q 11)
- The Debutante (Q 11)
- The Sobrang Gud Nite Show With Jojo A All the Way! (Q 11)
- Those Who Hunt Elves (Q 11)
- Kami Naman! (UNTV 37)
- Maestra Viajes (UNTV 37)
- Bihasa: Bibliya Hamon Sa'yo (UNTV 37)
- Believer TV (UNTV 37)
- Gabay sa Kalusugan (Net 25)
- Kapatid sa Hanapbuhay (Net 25)
- TV Patrol Pagadian (ABS-CBN TV-9 Pagadian)
- Spin 2 Win (RJTV 29)

== Networks ==
=== Launches ===
- January 1:
  - AXN Beyond Southeast Asia
  - Balls
  - Maxxx
  - Velvet
- January 28: FashionTV
- May 1: ABC 24
- August 9: TV5
- August 20: MMDA TV
- September 14: C/S Origin

==== Unknown dates ====
- March: Global News Network
- March: ZOE TV 33

==== Unknown ====
- SouthSpot
- ZTV 33

=== Stations changing network affiliation ===
The following is a list of television stations that have made or will make noteworthy network affiliation changes in 2008.

| Date | Station | Channel | Prior affiliation | New affiliation | Source |
|---|---|---|---|---|---|
| January 1 | RPN | 9 | None | C/S 9 (now RPTV) | |
| January 1 | SBN | 21 | None | ETC (now SolarFlix) | |
| January 1 | RJTV | 29 | None | 2nd Avenue (now RJ DigiTV) | |

=== Rebranded ===
The following is a list of television stations that have made or will make noteworthy network rebranded in 2008.

| Date | Rebranded from | Rebranded to | Channel | Source |
|---|---|---|---|---|
| March 10 | UniversiTV | ZOE TV (now Light TV) | 33 | |
| August 9 | ABC 5 | TV5 | 5 | |

=== Closures ===
- March 10: UniversiTV
- August 8: ABC 5

=== Cable Channel reassignments ===
- November 2: Iglesia ni Cristo Channel (Ch. 22; moved to Ch. 136)

== Births ==
- January 24: Chlaui Malayao, actress
- February 7: Antonio Vinzon, actor
- July 11: Krystal Mejes, actress
- July 31: Raikko Mateo, actor
- August 6: Princess Aliyah, actress
- September 7: Charlie Fleming, actress
- September 18: Chunsa Jung, actress
- October 10: Sophia Reola, actress
- November 10: Caprice Cayetano, actress
- December 18: Lee Victor, actor

== Deaths ==
- March 8: Carol Varga, 80, FAMAS-award-winning actress (born 1928)
- April 27: Marcos Mataro, 40, former member of Iglesia ni Cristo and ex-host of D'X-Man (born 1968)
- May 16: Henry Canoy, 74, founder of Radio Mindanao Network; grandfather of ABS-CBN reporter Jeff Canoy (born 1923)
- May 26: Dolly Aglay, 42, journalist with Reuters and Philippine Star (born 1966)
- June 7: Rudy Fernandez, 56, Filipino actor (born 1952)
- July 22: Gilbert Perez, 49, movie and TV director (born 1959)
- August 28: Zorayda Sanchez, 56, film and TV comedian (born 1952)
- September 1: Dely Magpayo, 88, radio host best known as "Tia Dely" (born 1920)
- September 21: Roger Mercado, 69, adoptive father and uncle of Jennylyn Mercado (born 1939)
- October 13: Khryss Adalia, 62, film and television director (born 1946)
- December 4: Manuel Yan, 88, former AFP Chief of Staff and diplomat; grandfather of the late Rico Yan (born 1920)
- December 7: Marky Cielo, 20, StarStruck 3's Ultimate Male Survivor and Ultimate Soul Survivor (born 1988)
- December 31: Rosendo delas Alas, 88, father of comedian Ai-Ai delas Alas (born 1920)

== See also ==
- 2008 in television
