= Monica Prieto-Teodoro =

Filipino politician (born 1966)

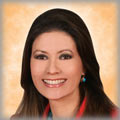
- Prieto-Teodoro during the 14th Congress

Special Envoy of the Philippines to UNICEF
- Incumbent
- In role July 23, 2022
- Appointed by: Bongbong Marcos
- In role September 26, 2017 – September 27, 2018
- Appointed by: Rodrigo Duterte

Member of the Philippine House of Representatives from Tarlac's 1st congressional district
- In office June 30, 2007 – June 30, 2010
- Preceded by: Gilbert Teodoro
- Succeeded by: Enrique Cojuangco

Personal details
- Born: Monica Louise Prieto; March 3, 1966 (age 60)
- Party: Lakas (2009–present)
- Other political affiliations: NPC (2007–2009)
- Spouse: Gilbert Teodoro (m. 1992)
- Children: 1
- Relatives: Gilberto Teodoro Sr. (father-in-law)
- Education: Webster University Geneva
- Occupation: Realtor; Politician
- Website: Official Website of Monica Prieto-Teodoro

Monica Louise "Nikki" Prieto-Teodoro (born March 3, 1966) is a Filipino politician who currently serves as the Philippines' special envoy to the UNICEF since July 2022; she previously held the title from September 2017 to September 2018. She is the wife of Gilbert Teodoro, the incumbent Secretary of National Defense. She was the Representative of the 1st district of Tarlac during the 14th Congress of the Philippines from 2007 to 2010. Teodoro was the chairperson and vice-chairperson, respectively of the House Committees on the Welfare of Children and on Population and Family Relations. She authored several bills for the protection of children, including the Anti-Corporal Punishment Act and the Anti-Child Pornography Act. She also helped build Amor Complex, a children's shelter in Tarlac, and the Golden Rooster Foundation that raises funds for underprivileged children.

== Education ==
Teodoro graduated from Webster University Geneva in Switzerland with a degree in International Marketing, where she was trained in the basics of the international economy. She then returned home to become a successful real estate entrepreneur. She also studied in various schools such as Marymount, St. Joseph's School, and Notre Dame in California.

== Personal life ==
She is married to incumbent Defense Secretary Gilbert Teodoro, with whom she has a son. Before politics and her real estate venture, Teodoro used to be a commercial model. She was a former equestrienne and is a PADI-certified scuba diver.

In 2026, China imposed sanctions and an entry ban on Teodoro, her husband, and their son, citing statements her husband made against the country.

House of Representatives of the Philippines
Preceded by Gilbert Teodoro	Member of the House of Representatives from Tarlac's 1st district 2007-2010	Succeeded by Enrique Cojuangco
