= Erlinda Espiritu =

First woman to graduate from Harvard Law School

- Born: Erlinda Cayetano Arce Ignacio; September 1925
- Died: June 24, 2008 (aged 82)
- Education: Manuel L. Quezon University; Harvard Law School
- Occupation: Lawyer
- Spouse: Benjamin Espiritu (died 1953)
- Children: 1

Erlinda Arce Ignacio Espiritu (c. September 1925 – June 24, 2008) was a Filipino lawyer. She was the first woman to graduate from Harvard Law School.

== Background ==
Born Erlinda Cayetano Arce Ignacio in September 1925, she was the daughter of Arturo Arce Ignacio, who served four terms as Governor of Oriental Mindoro. She recounted growing up in a time where women are expected to stay home; and educated women to become teachers.

She graduated magna cum laude from the Manuel L. Quezon University School of Law and became a lawyer in 1947. Her father wished her to study abroad, so she applied to Harvard Law School, not knowing they had recently allowed applications from women. She earned her master's degree in 1951. Her fiance Benjamin Espiritu joined her at Harvard halfway through her studies and they married in Cambridge, Massachusetts. They returned to the Philippines and had a son, but her husband died of leukemia in 1953, two months after her son's birth. Her son, Benjamin "Chippy" Ignacio Espiritu, was later elected Governor of Oriental Mindoro.

Erlinda Espiritu worked as corporate legal counsel for a land developer. In 1959, she was appointed to her first criminal case by the Supreme Court of the Philippines, defending inmate Primitivo Ala y Duran who was sentenced to be executed for murder. While the Supreme Court upheld the sentence, her client received a commutation from the President of the Philippines. She gave up her legal career to take over the presidency of her family's rural bank in the 1960s. She continued to pro bono work until May 2006 when her health began to deteriorate. He underwent a medical procedure for brain cancer in July 2007.

Espiritu later returned to Harvard in October 2007 as a guest of honor at an LL.M. dinner. She died on June 24, 2008.

== Awards and honors ==
In 2025, her son endowed the Erlinda Arce Ignacio Espiritu Professorial Chair in Civil Law and Legal Innovations at the Manuel L. Quezon University School of Law to honor his deceased mother.
