= Gilbert Teodoro =

Filipino lawyer and politician (born 1964)

Gilberto Teodoro
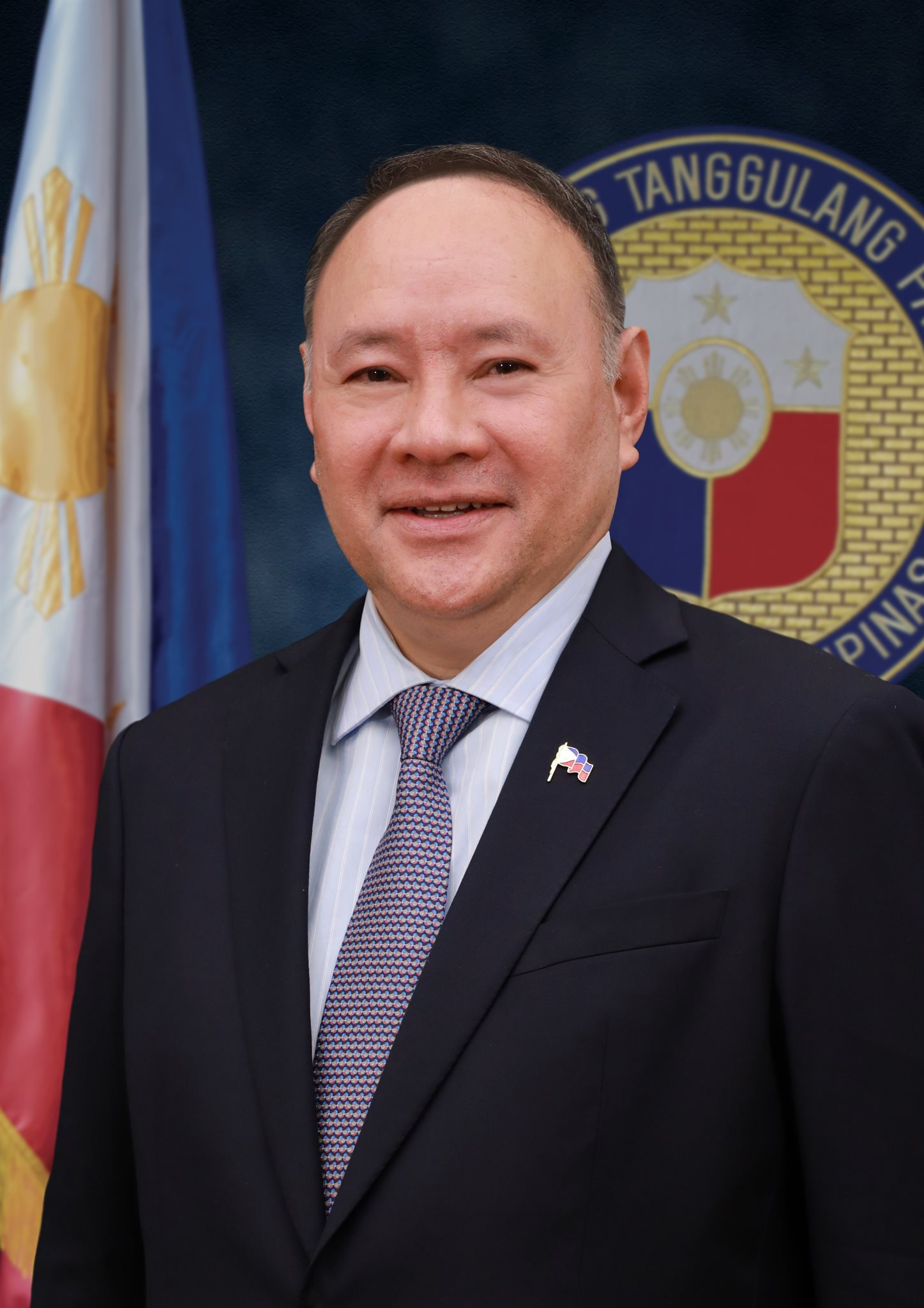
- Official portrait, 2023

23rd Secretary of National Defense
- Incumbent
- Assumed office June 5, 2023
- President: Bongbong Marcos
- Preceded by: Carlito Galvez Jr. (OIC)
- In office August 3, 2007 – November 15, 2009
- President: Gloria Macapagal Arroyo
- Preceded by: Norberto Gonzales (OIC)
- Succeeded by: Norberto Gonzales

Member of the House of Representatives from Tarlac's 1st district
- In office June 30, 1998 – June 30, 2007
- Preceded by: Peping Cojuangco
- Succeeded by: Monica Prieto-Teodoro

Member of the Tarlac Provincial Board from the Kabataang Barangay
- In office 1980–1986

Personal details
- Born: Gilberto Eduardo Gerardo Cojuangco Teodoro Jr. June 14, 1964 (age 62) Manila, Philippines
- Citizenship: Philippines; Malta (2016–2021)
- Party: PRP (since 2021)
- Other political affiliations: Lakas (2009–2021); NPC (1998–2009); Independent (1980–1998)
- Spouse: Monica Prieto (m. 1992)
- Children: 1
- Parent: Gilberto Teodoro Sr. (father)
- Relatives: Cojuangco family
- Education: De La Salle University (BS); University of the Philippines Diliman (LLB); Harvard University (LLM); West Negros University (LLD)
- Occupation: Politician; business executive
- Profession: Lawyer
- Known for: Independent director of BDO Unibank; Board chairman of Sagittarius Mines Inc.
- Website: Official website

Military service
- Allegiance: Philippines
- Branch/service: Philippine Air Force Reserve Command
- Rank: Colonel

Gilberto Eduardo Gerardo "Gilbert" Cojuangco Teodoro Jr. PLH (born June 14, 1964), nicknamed Gibo ([ɡɪˈboʔ]), is a Filipino lawyer, politician, and business executive who has served as the 23rd secretary of national defense under President Bongbong Marcos since 2023. He served in the same post from 2007 to 2009 under President Gloria Macapagal Arroyo. He was the nominee of Arroyo's Lakas–Kampi in the 2010 presidential election, which he lost to his second cousin, Benigno Aquino III.

Teodoro studied commerce at De La Salle University, then law at the University of the Philippines and Harvard Law School. He practiced law until he was elected as Representative of Tarlac's 1st district, serving from 1998 to 2007.

Teodoro has been described as a technocrat. During his first stint as defense secretary, he was the chairman of the National Disaster Coordinating Council (NDCC) when Mega Manila was hit by Typhoon Ketsana (Ondoy).

== Early life and education ==
Teodoro was born to the Cojuangco clan, a Chinese Filipino clan. He finished elementary in 1977 and high school in 1981 at Xavier School. He obtained his undergraduate degree in commerce major in Financial Institutions from De La Salle University in 1984. He studied law at the University of the Philippines College of Law from 1985 to 1989, and finished at the top of his class. He was awarded the Dean's Medal for Academic Excellence. He topped the 1989 Philippine Bar Examinations with an 86.18% bar rating.

In 1997, he obtained his Master of Laws degree from Harvard Law School of Harvard University in Cambridge, Massachusetts, and he passed the State Bar of New York. In 2009, he completed his Doctor of Laws at what was then West Negros University.

According to his classmates, Teodoro was "very intelligent", "very unassuming", and a "very cool" person. However, the authenticity of these claims have been questioned. During his college days, he was not involved in campus politics, and was busy with his commitments outside school, including being a member of the Sangguniang Kabataan (Youth Council) in Tarlac and attending flight training.

From 1989 to 1996, Teodoro was a lawyer at the EP Mendoza Law firm, owned by Estelito Mendoza.

== Political and government career ==
=== Before Congress ===
At the age of 16, in 1980, Teodoro was elected as the Kabataang Barangay (KB) President in Tarlac. He served at the position until 1986. He went on to lead Central Luzon. He became a member of the Tarlac Provincial Board when his mother was the Tarlac representative in the National Assembly.

=== Congressman (1998–2007) ===
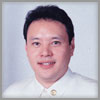
Official portrait of Gilbert Teodoro during the 13th Congress

From 1998 to 2007, he was a House Representative for the First District of Tarlac province. He assumed the position of Assistant Majority Leader in the 11th Congress and head of the Nationalist People's Coalition House members. He was a member of the House contingent to the Legislative-Executive Development Advisory Council. Teodoro was a part of the "Bright Boys" clique. He authored 106 bills during his time, among which was a bill seeking to repeal capital punishment.

Following his three terms in office—the maximum number allowed by the constitution — he was succeeded by his wife, Monica Prieto-Teodoro.

=== Secretary of National Defense (2007–2009) ===
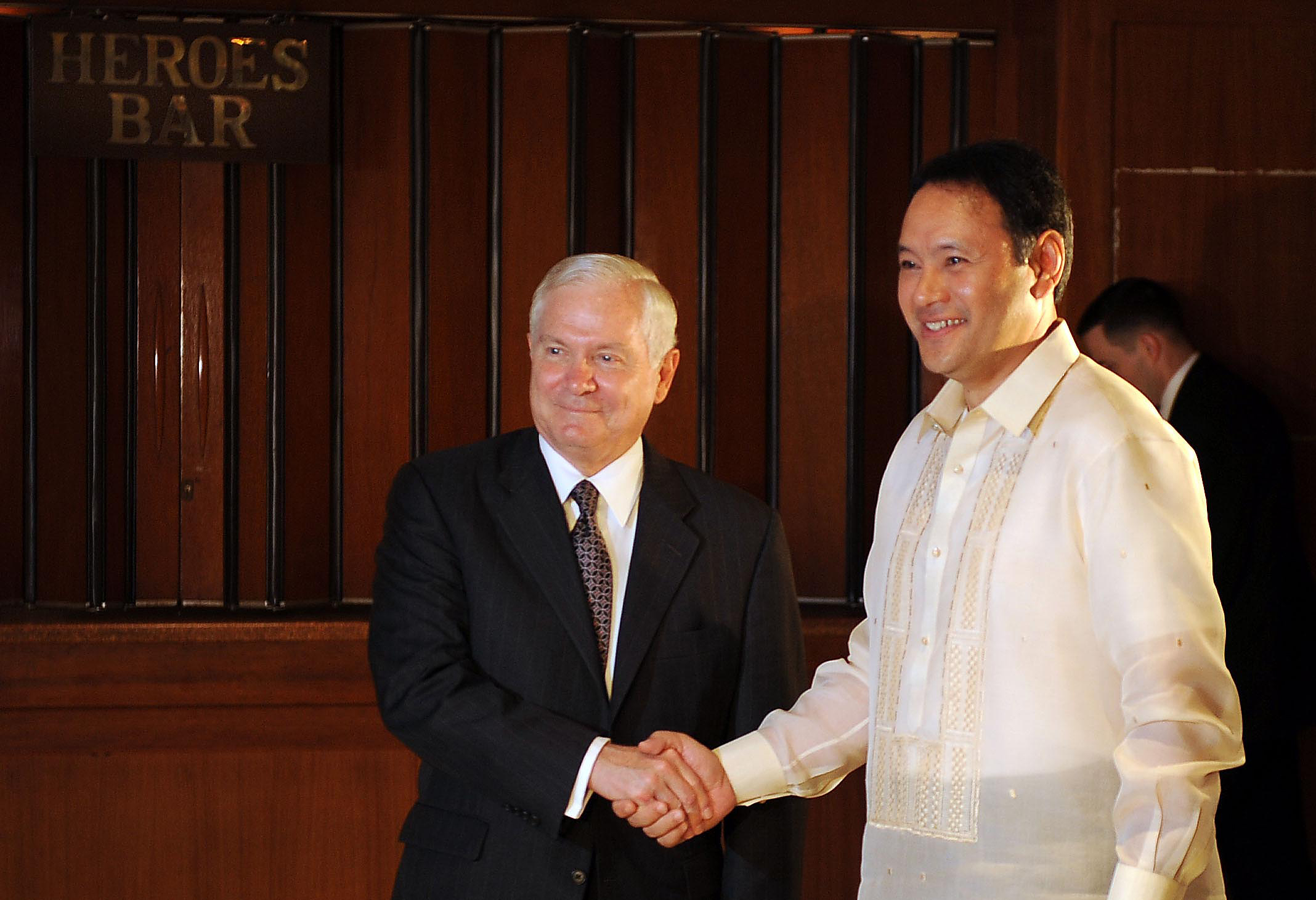
US Defense Secretary Robert M. Gates and Defense Secretary Teodoro (right) at a press conference at Camp Aguinaldo, June 1, 2009.

Teodoro was appointed secretary of national defense in August 2007 at the age of 43. He was the second youngest person to ever hold the position after Ramon Magsaysay, who assumed the position a day after he turned 43.

=== Chairman of the National Disaster Coordinating Council ===
While serving as the Secretary of National Defense, Teodoro concurrently headed the National Disaster Coordinating Council (NDCC), a temporary organization that supports the relief efforts being done by the local government in times of natural disasters. When Typhoon Ketsana hit the country, Teodoro immediately issued an appeal for international aid through the United Nations and organized relief operations in the affected areas given the limitations in resources and the scale of the disaster. He mitigated the devastation wrought by the typhoon and prioritized the areas at risk of being wiped out.

Under the law (PD 1566), the NDCC's role as a temporary or ad hoc committee is very limiting because it places the budget and primary responsibility during natural disasters on the hands of local government officials. For this reason, Teodoro expressed the desire for bills that seek to replace PD 1566 with a permanent Disaster Risk Reduction Council (DRRC) that will be given the right powers and resources to correct the weaknesses of the current law.

=== 2010 presidential campaign ===
Teodoro during his party's Grand Rally at Rizal Memorial Stadium in Manila.

In March 2009, Teodoro announced his intention to run for President of the Philippines in the May 2010 election. Months earlier, he quit his old party Nationalist People's Coalition (NPC) to join the merged administration party Lakas–Kampi and cast his name in the ruling party's contenders for the 2010 elections.

In September 2009, voting 42–5 through secret balloting, the executive committee of Lakas-Kampi selected Teodoro as their party's presidential nominee for the May 2010 elections, edging out the other nominee, MMDA Chairman Bayani Fernando. The announcement was made by Lakas–Kampi Secretary General Gabriel Claudio after a deliberation that lasted for approximately an hour.

Teodoro's 2010 campaign platform includes encouraging political growth in the provinces and improving healthcare and education. He stated that he would not interfere if Arroyo were to be charged at a later date.

On November 20, Gloria Macapagal Arroyo resigned her post as Chairman of Lakas–Kampi–CMD and handed over the post to Teodoro.

A crowd estimate of 135,000 rallied behind Teodoro and his party during the grand rally in Manila, 2010

Teodoro's campaign slogan was "Galing at Talino" (capability and competence). According to him, public service does not only entail integrity, but ability and competence as well because people are looking for clear plans and not just mere promises and most of all positive campaigning. During the campaign, he shunned from mudslinging and encouraged other Presidentiables to do away with smear campaigning because it breeds disunity among Filipinos.

On May 11, 2010, a day after the elections were held, Teodoro conceded defeat to the leading presidential candidate, Senator Noynoy Aquino of the Liberal Party, who is his second cousin. During a press conference he held at the Lakas Kampi CMD national headquarters in Metro Manila, Teodoro wished Aquino well and announced his decision to return to private life to take care of his family.

=== 2022 senatorial campaign ===
Prior to the 2016 presidential elections, Davao City Mayor Rodrigo Duterte advised Senator Miriam Defensor Santiago to make Teodoro her running mate for vice president; in return, Duterte will support the tandem. However, Santiago chose Senator Bongbong Marcos as her running mate. Duterte then ran for the presidency and won. In May 2016, Duterte offered Teodoro to return to his post as Secretary of National Defense but said that he would consult his family first on his final decision as to whether he would accept it. In early June 2016, he declined Duterte's offer. He was yet again offered by Duterte for the defense post on August 23, 2016.

In June 2021, Teodoro expressed interest in running for vice president and becoming the running mate of Sara Duterte, who was rumored to run for president in 2022. However, Duterte announced that she would instead continue her term as mayor of Davao City; she would later withdraw her reelection bid to instead run for vice president. On October 7, 2021, Teodoro, through a proxy (he was in isolation after testing positive for COVID-19 at that time), filed his certificate of candidacy for senator under People's Reform Party for the 2022 election. As a candidate, he expressed opposition to the reinstitution of the death penalty, but "not for any moral reasons. I feel that it is acceptable but you must have the mechanism to guarantee a fair trial." He was named to the UniTeam senatorial slate. However, his bid was unsuccessful, placing 15th out of the 12 seats up for election.

=== Secretary of National Defense (2023–present) ===
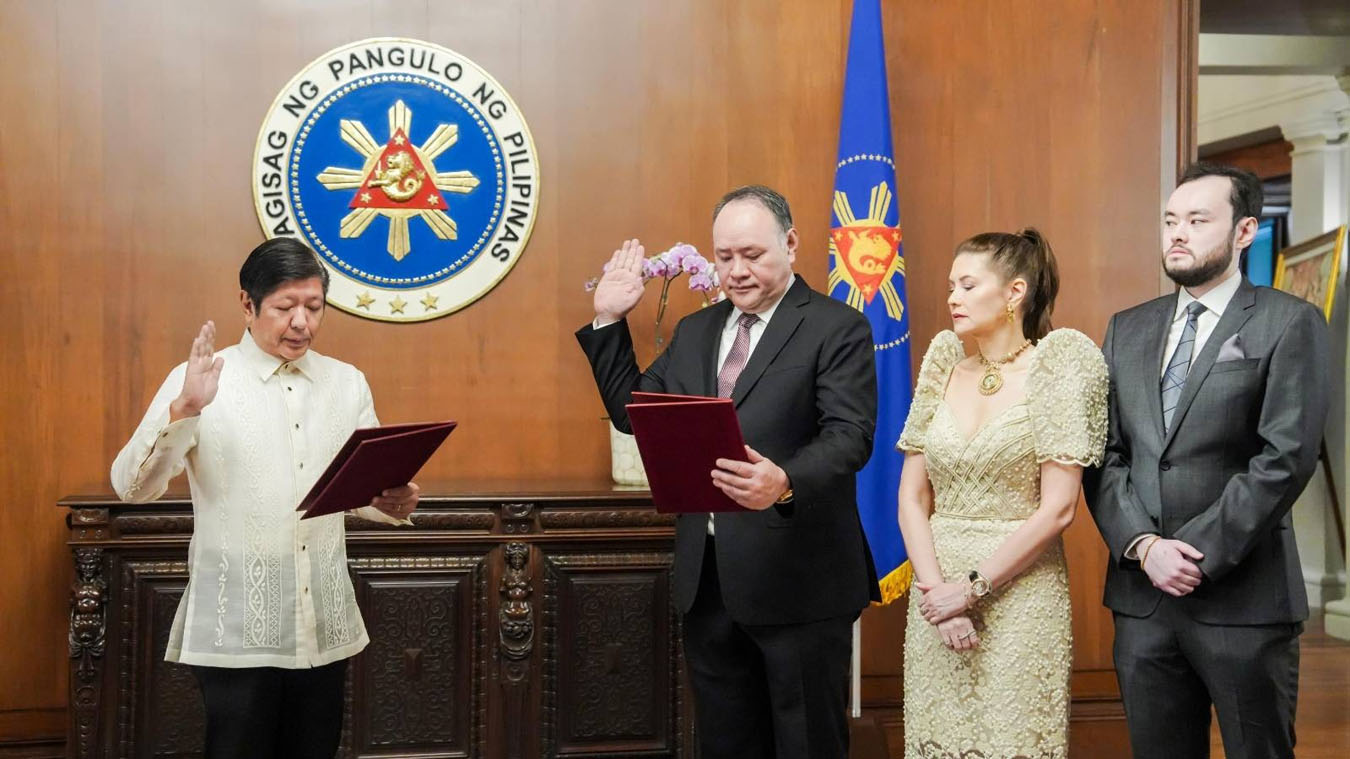
Teodoro being sworn in as Defense Secretary before President Bongbong Marcos at Malacañang Palace, June 5, 2023.

On June 5, 2023, Teodoro was reappointed as secretary of national defense by President Bongbong Marcos, whom the former succeeded undersecretary Carlito Galvez Jr. in the position (of which Galvez served as Defense Secretary in an officer-in-charge capacity since January 9, 2023).

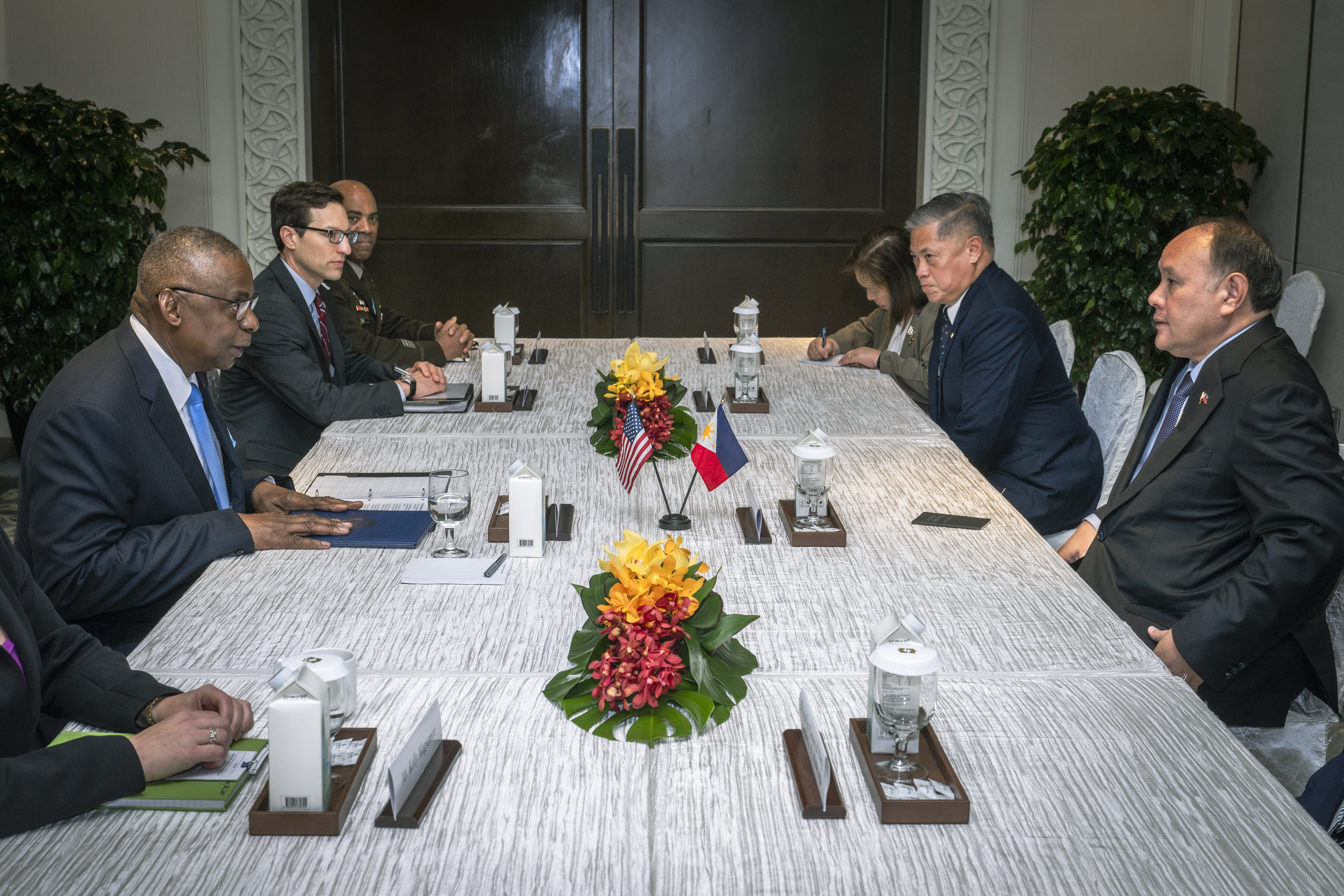
Defense Secretary Teodoro (right) and then-U.S. Defense Secretary Lloyd Austin III at the International Institute for Strategic Studies (IISS) during the 21st Shangri-La Dialogue in Singapore, June 1, 2024.

As defense secretary, Teodoro Jr. took a strong stance against Chinese incursions into Philippine waters. He described China encroaching in Philippine waters as akin to acting like illegal occupants, or "squatters" in Philippine colloquial terms.

In October 2023, Teodoro, in a Pilipinas Ngayon briefing, called the Chinese narrative of the Philippines being a "U.S. puppet" as "very insulting".

And I think this is really looking down on us and that really disgusts me, and so hinihimok ko po ating mga kababayan na talagang tumindig laban dito sa pag insulto ng China sa atin (I am urging our country to stand-up versus this insult of China against us)

— Gilbert Teodoro, Pilipinas Ngayon (October 2023)

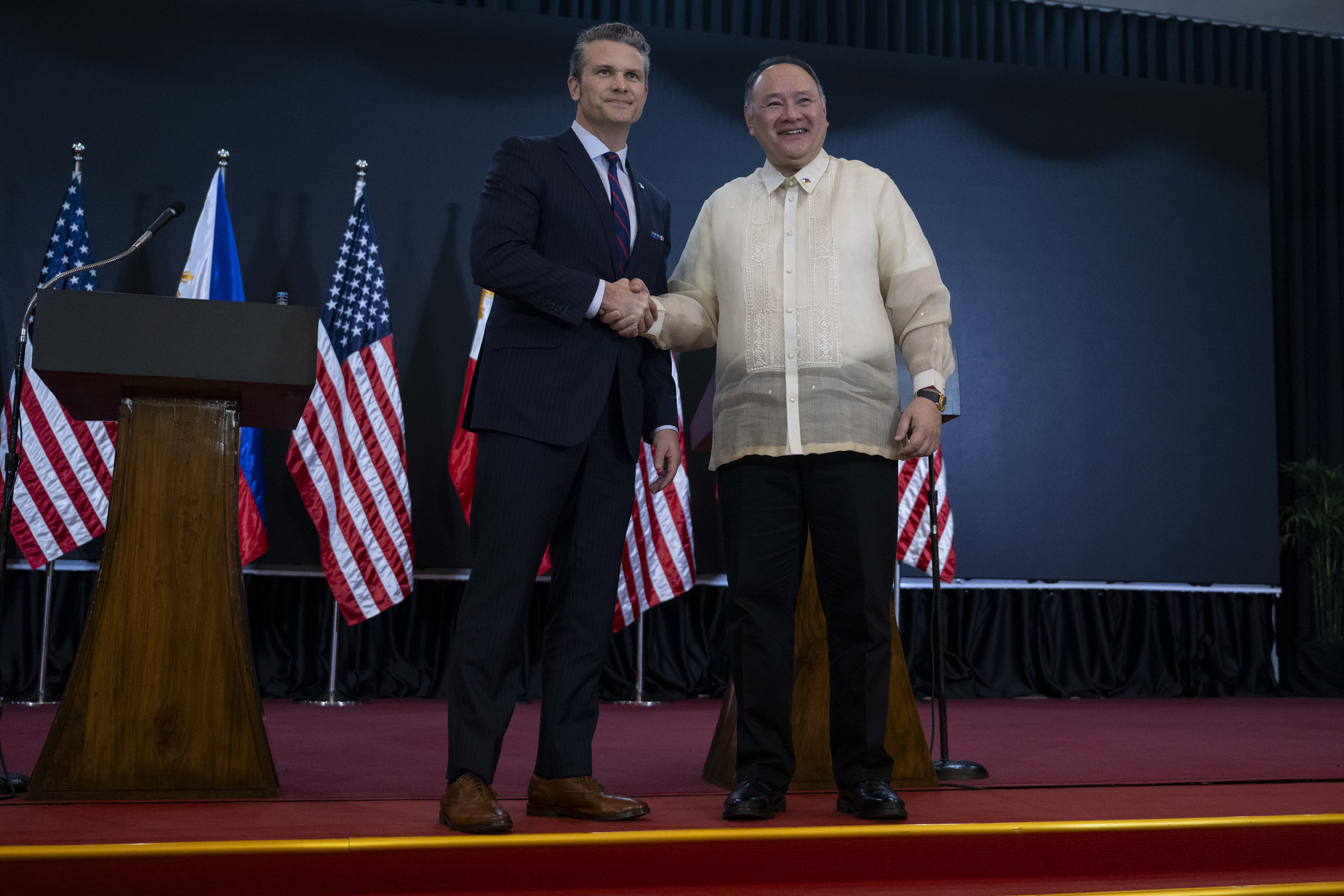
Defense Secretary Teodoro (right) hosts US Defense Secretary Pete Hegseth at Camp Aguinaldo, March 28, 2025.

In September 2024, Teodoro extended the stay of the Typhon midrange capability (MRC) missile in the country to protect the South China Sea (West Philippine Sea). In November 2024, U.S. Defense Secretary Lloyd Austin visited Manila and met with Teodoro. This was to review the bilateral cooperation between the Philippines and the United States. China's foreign ministry spokesperson Lin Jian reacted to this visit saying that no military agreement "should target any third party" and "should exacerbate regional tensions". Teodoro was known for his heated exchange with Chinese diplomat Mao Ning over the Taiwan issue in early 2024, accusing Mao of "gutter-level talk" and debasing the party she represents.

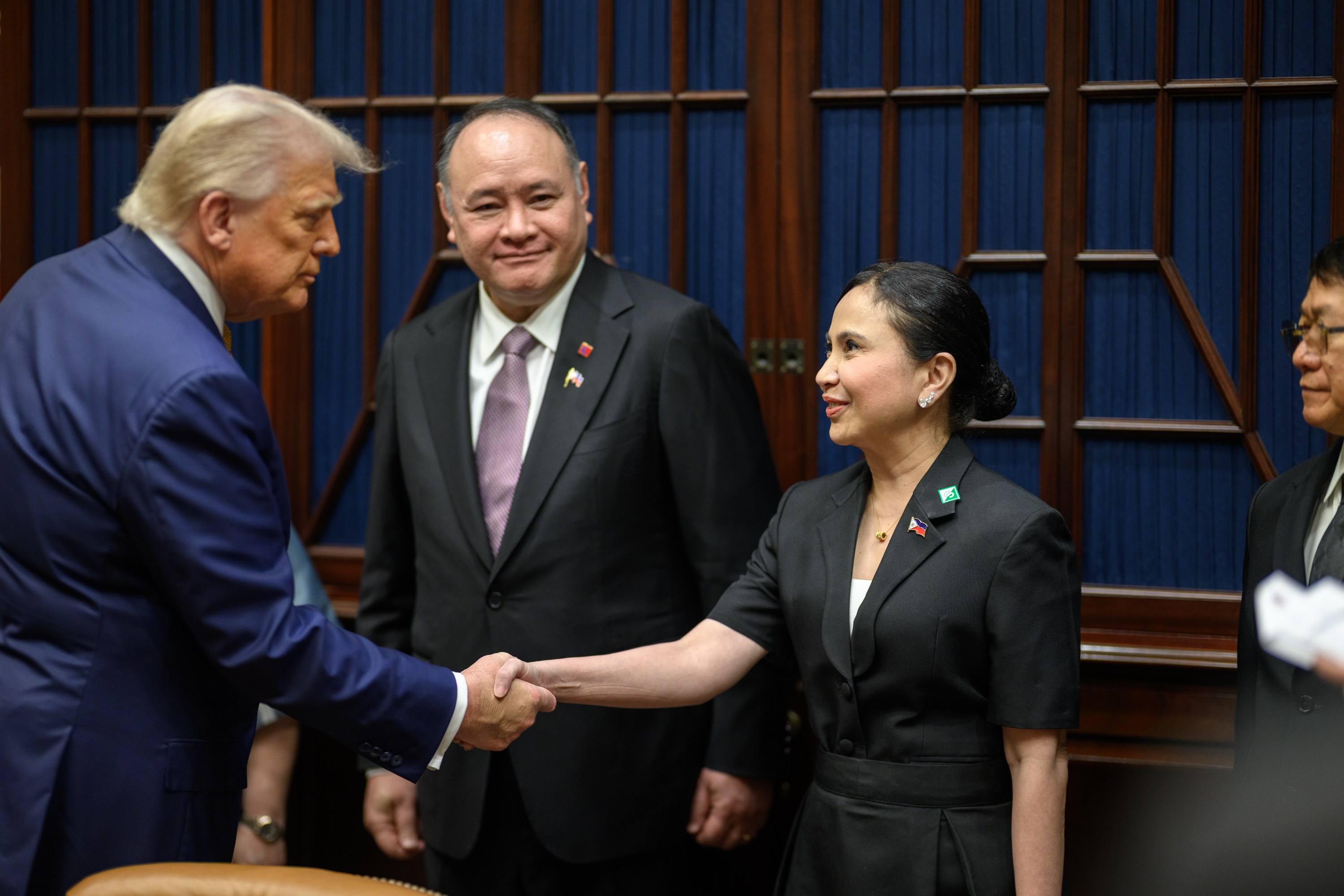
Defense Secretary Teodoro (center), Trade and Industry Secretary Cristina Aldeguer-Roque (1st, right) and National Security Adviser Eduardo Año (2nd, right) meets US President Donald Trump (left) at the Roosevelt Room in the White House in Washington, D.C., July 22, 2025.

In response to China's accusations to the Philippines, Teodoro claimed that it was China causing tension in the South China Sea not the Philippines.

In 2026, China imposed sanctions and an entry ban on Teodoro, his wife Monica, and their son, citing "erroneous remarks" he made.

== Business and writing career ==
In April 2014, Teodoro was elected as an independent director of BDO Unibank. In August 2015, he was named chairman of the Board of Sagittarius Mines Incorporated (SMI). He is the chairman of the Board of Indophil Resources Incorporated. He is an independent director of the Philippine Geothermal Production Company, Inc. (PGPC), and Alphaland Corporation.

He wrote an op-ed piece entitled "The Philippines' Triumph: Right over Might" published on The Diplomat in July 2016.

He participated in the 150th Rizal Anniversary Conference on Nation and Culture and subtitled his "Thoughts on Philippine Culture from a Non-Culturati Person". (published by the Solidaridad Publishing House in 2012.)

== Personal life ==
=== Family ===
Teodoro is the only child of former Social Security System administrator Gilberto Teodoro Sr. and former Batasang Pambansa member Mercedes Cojuangco-Teodoro. He is the nephew of Danding Cojuangco, chairman of San Miguel Corporation.

Teodoro is a second cousin of former president, Benigno Aquino III, son of former President Corazon Aquino and former Senator Ninoy Aquino. Teodoro's mother is a first cousin of Aquino's mother, former President Corazon Aquino. Both families have always been on different sides of the political fence since the 1960s. During the administration of President Ferdinand Marcos, Teodoro's father served as Social Security System administrator, while Aquino's father, former senator Benigno Aquino Jr., was a leading opposition leader.

Teodoro is married to Monica Prieto, with whom he has a son, Jaime Gilberto.

=== Citizenship ===
Teodoro previously possessed Maltese citizenship and a Maltese passport, which he obtained in 2016 but renounced prior to filing his candidacy for senator in October 2021. According to the Department of National Defense spokesperson, Assistant Secretary Arsenio Andolong, Teodoro had disclosed this information to the Bureau of Immigration and the Commission on Elections ahead of the 2022 elections, as well as to the Commission on Appointments prior to his confirmation as Defense Secretary in July 2023. Legal experts consulted on the matter stated that if Teodoro indeed renounced his Maltese citizenship, the controversy over dual nationality is irrelevant, given the Philippine constitutional prohibition on dual citizenship for public officials.

=== Memberships ===
Teodoro, who holds distinct memberships in the Integrated Bar of the Philippines, UP Alumni Association, UP Law Alumni Association, Harvard Alumni Association, and the Harvard Law Alumni Association, is also a licensed commercial pilot with a Learjet 31 rating and a Colonel in the Philippine Air Force Reserve.

Government offices
Preceded by Norberto Gonzales	Secretary of National Defense; 2007–2009	Succeeded by Norberto Gonzales
Preceded by Carlito Galvez Jr. (OIC)	Secretary of National Defense; 2023–present	Incumbent
House of Representatives of the Philippines
Preceded by Jose Cojuangco Jr.	Member of the House of Representatives from Tarlac's 1st district 1998–2007	Succeeded by Monica Prieto-Teodoro
Party political offices
Preceded by Gloria Macapagal Arroyo	Chair of Lakas Kampi CMD; 2009–2010	Succeeded by Amelita Villarosa (Acting)
Preceded by Gloria Macapagal Arroyo	Lakas Kampi CMD nominee for President of the Philippines; 2010	Most recent
Order of precedence
Preceded by Francis Tolentino as Secretary of Labor and Employment	Order of Precedence of the Philippines as Secretary of National Defense	Succeeded by Edwin Mercado as Secretary of Health
