= Billy Balbastro =

Filipino lawyer and journalist

- Born: Filemon R. Balbastro Jr. November 13, 1940; Oton, Iloilo, Commonwealth of the Philippines
- Died: February 2, 2008 (aged 67); Taguig, Metro Manila, Philippines
- Occupations: lawyer, entertainment columnist

Filemon R. Balbastro Jr. (November 13, 1940 – February 2, 2008), better known as Billy Balbastro, was a Filipino lawyer and entertainment columnist.

== Early life ==
Balbastro was born in Oton, Iloilo. By the age of fifteen, Balbastro was covering the entertainment beat for the Philippine Free Press and the Kislap-Graphic. He graduated from the University of the Philippines College of Law in 1962, and worked for ten years in the Commission of Elections (COMELEC) with stints in Vigan and Romblon. His columns appeared in the Abante and Abante Tonight tabloids. From 1982 to 1985, Balbastro was the president of the Philippine Movie Press Club.

Balbastro hosted a showbusiness-themed radio program, Showtime with Billy, which aired over DZMM. He also was a member of the Committee for Cinema of the National Commission for Culture and the Arts.

== Filmography ==
=== Radio ===
- Showtime With Billy (2000–2008; DZMM)

=== TV Show ===
- Movie Magazine (1985–1992); GMA Network)
- Two for the Road (1979–1980; GMA Network)
- Troika Tonite (1993–1995; ABC 5)

=== Movies ===
- Sinong Pipigil sa Pagpatak ng Ulan? (1979; publicity and promotions)
- High School Circa '65 (1979; publicity staff)
- Kaaway ng Batas (1990; public relations officer)
- Lt. Madarang: Iginuhit sa Dugo (1993; publicity and promotions)
- Lab Kita ... Bilib Ka Ba? (1994; publicity and promotions)
- Costales (1995; publicist)
- Tapatan ng Tapang (1997; publicity and promotions)
- Tampisaw (2002; promotion and publicity)
- Takaw-tingin (2004; promotion and publicity)
- Anak ni Brocka (2005)
- Kaleldo (2006; publicity and promotions)
- Twilight Dancers - Mr. Big Judge (2006)
- Troika (2007; publicist)

== Death ==
Billy Balbastro died from lung cancer on February 2, 2008, in Parañaque.
