= Bakbakan =

- Genre: Sports
- Presented by: Dyan Castillejo
- Country of origin: Philippines
- Original language: Taglish
- No. of episodes: 50

Production
- Running time: 60 minutes

Original release
- Network: ABS-CBN
- Release: June 15, 2008 – May 31, 2009

Bakbakan is a boxing television program broadcast by ABS-CBN. The series aired from June 15, 2008 to May 31, 2009, replacing Gaby's Xtraordinary Files. It features boxers, sports analysts and profiles from the past. The program is hosted by Dyan Castillejo.

== See also ==
- List of programs broadcast by ABS-CBN
