= Kakasa Ka Ba sa Grade 5? =

Philippine television game show

- Title card
- Genre: Game show
- Based on: Are You Smarter than a 5th Grader? by Mark Burnett
- Directed by: Uro Q. dela Cruz
- Presented by: Janno Gibbs
- Opening theme: "Kakasa Ka Ba sa Grade 5?" by Sugarpop
- Country of origin: Philippines
- Original language: Tagalog
- No. of seasons: 2
- No. of episodes: 47

Production
- Executive producer: Wilma Galvante
- Camera setup: Multiple-camera setup
- Running time: 60 minutes
- Production company: GMA Entertainment TV

Original release
- Network: GMA Network
- Release: October 27, 2007 – May 9, 2009

Kakasa Ka Ba sa Grade 5? (transl. are you ready for grade 5?) is a Philippine television game show broadcast by GMA Network. The show is the Philippine version of Are You Smarter than a 5th Grader?. Hosted by Janno Gibbs, it premiered on October 27, 2007. The first season concluded on March 29, 2008. The show returned for its second season on November 8, 2008. The show concluded on May 9, 2009, with a total of 47 episodes.

== Overview ==
The show was announced under the proposed title Are You Smarter Than a Fifth Grader?: Pinoy Edition after the network acquired the format from Mark Burnett International. The acquisition came as GMA's sister network Q started airing the American version. The title of the Philippine version came later.

For two episodes in March 2009, Mo Twister temporarily took over the hosting plum for the show after Gibbs called in sick.

== Ratings ==
According to AGB Nielsen Philippines' Mega Manila household television ratings, the final episode of Kakasa Ka Ba sa Grade 5? scored a 21.2% rating.

== Accolades ==
Accolades received by Kakasa Ka Ba sa Grade 5?
| Year | Award | Category | Recipient | Result | Ref. |
|---|---|---|---|---|---|
| 2009 | 23rd PMPC Star Awards for Television | Best Game Show Host | Janno Gibbs | Nominated | |
