= Mang Pandoy =

Filipino street vendor

- Born: Felipe Natanio c. 1945; Commonwealth of the Philippines
- Died: August 28, 2008 (aged 62–63); Quezon City, Philippines
- Occupation: Street vendor

Felipe Natanio (1945 – August 28, 2008) was a Filipino street vendor whose claim to fame was his role, under the pseudonym "Mang Pandoy" (Mister Pandoy), as "the face of the poor" during the administration of President Fidel V. Ramos.

== The Face of the Poor ==
Natanio shot to national fame as the result of the 1992 Presidential Debates, where host Randy David showed a video presentation of the street vendor's life circumstances before asking the candidates how they would address poverty, as exemplified and humanized by Natanio's story. During the segment, his identity was concealed under the pseudonym "Mang Pandoy."

Living in a small shack in Commonwealth village in Quezon City, Mang Pandoy's education had ended in the third grade, and he earned a living for himself and his eight children by selling vegetables by the street side. This earned him about Php50 a day. By 1992, however, he had gotten too sick to do even that and was at a loss over how he would feed his family. He joked that he would be willing to be shot in exchange for Php 100 000, which would provide for his family's needs.

When Fidel Ramos won the presidential election, the new president presented Mang Pandoy to the Philippine public in his first State of the Nation Address (SONA) as "the face of the poor," promising him and other poor Filipinos a better life.

== Doleouts ==
Since Ramos had called attention to his plight, Mang Pandoy was presented with a number of new opportunities during the Ramos administration. He was hired as the co-host of "Ang Pandayan ni Mang Pandoy", a weekly television show on the government-owned television network PTV 4 (now NBN 4), where he earned at least Php2,000 per episode. Later, he was hired as a consultant by the then Speaker of the Philippine House of Representatives, Jose de Venecia. These jobs were his last employment. He would later receive doleouts both from De Venecia and from the Quezon City government but he was unable to make the money grow, and he eventually faded into relative obscurity.

== Death and legacy ==
At about 6:30 p.m. August 28, 2008, at age 63, Mang Pandoy finally succumbed to tuberculosis, a symbol of the Filipino poor and, in the words of one news report, "an icon of token relief and unkept promises."

One commentator, expounding on the events that brought Mang Pandoy from poverty to fame and back noted:

Mang Pandoy, whose earthly remains had been logged in an arm stretch of soggy earth, was a prop, period. He was an extra in a political telenovela. There was no intent to make his life the anchor of a massive and inspired poverty-alleviation program, period.

Jaime Aristotle Alip, CEO and founder of Center for Agriculture and Rural Development Mutually Reinforcing Institutions (CARD MRI) which one 2008's Ramon Magsaysay award for public service, took note of the icon's death at a forum after receiving the award, noting the need for long-term solutions to poverty in the Philippines rather than the dole-out approach that Mang Pandoy's story typified. Alip noted:

"It takes three to five years to bring a family out of poverty. It takes another five to eight years to stabilize them because a calamity could come and then everything they've worked for could be destroyed. And then you need another five years to move them from microentrepreneurs to full-fledged SMEs. It takes a real commitment for change, for sustainable development."

Since his family could not afford a burial for Mang Pandoy the Department of Social Welfare and Development (DSWD) eventually gave Php12,500 so that "the Face of the Filipino Poor" could finally be buried.

Although Mang Pandoy's symbolic role in Philippine history has been far greater, it has been likened to that of Joe The Plumber in the 2008 US Presidential Elections.
