= Armand Fabella =

Filipino businessman and educator (1930–2008)

Armand V. Fabella (21 April 1930 – 27 November 2008) was a Filipino businessman and educator. He served as the 42nd Secretary of Education from 1992 to 1994.

Fabella was born in Paris, France to Filipino parents. His father, Vicente K. Fabella, was the founder of Jose Rizal College (now Jose Rizal University). He earned a degree in economics from Harvard University and a master's in economics from Jose Rizal College, and also pursued post-graduate studies at the London School of Economics. In 1962, he was named as among the Ten Outstanding Young Men of the Philippines.

Fabella was named to various positions in the government of President Diosdado Macapagal, including as Assistant Executive Secretary and head of the Program Implementation Agency. He also served in the administration of President Ferdinand Marcos. During the administration of President Fidel Ramos, he served as Secretary of Education from 1992 to 1994. Ramos awarded him the Presidential Medal of Merit in 1998. Fabella also worked as a consultant for the Bangko Sentral ng Pilipinas, the World Bank, and the Asian Development Bank.

In the private sector, Fabella served on the board of directors of several corporations, including the Philippine Commercial and Industrial Bank, the United Coconut Planters Bank and the Knowledge Channel. He was the chairman of the board of the Private Education Retirement Annuity Association. He also served as chairman of the board of directors of the family-owned Jose Rizal University, and was chairman emeritus at the time of his death.
