= Loreto Paras-Sulit =

Filipino writer (1908–2008)

- Born: December 10, 1908; Ermita, Manila, Philippine Islands
- Died: April 23, 2008 (aged 99)
- Occupation: writer
- Writing career
- Genre: Short story

Loreto Paras-Sulit (December 10, 1908 – April 23, 2008) was a Filipino writer best known for her English-language short stories.

== Biography ==
Paras-Sulit was born in Ermita, Manila. After finishing her secondary education in Manila, she entered the University of the Philippines, where she first gained notice for her short fiction. While at the university, she co-founded the U.P. Writer's Club in 1927 along with other student-writers such as Arturo Rotor and Jose Garcia Villa. She graduated with a Bachelor of Science degree in education, magna cum laude, in 1930.

Paras-Sulit would join the faculty of Florentino Torres High School as an English teacher while maintaining an active writing career. She was a member of the Philippine Writers Association and the Literary Guild of the Philippines. In the 1940s, she joined the Philippine National Red Cross, of which she served as secretary-general for several decades. While at the Red Cross, she shifted her focus to short stories for children, publishing several works of that variety at the Philippine Junior Red Cross Magazine. She retired from public life after retiring from the Red Cross, dying in April, 2008 at the age of 99.

== Works ==
Paras-Sulit was considered at her productive peak during the period from 1927 to 1937. Her contemporary at the University of the Philippines, Jose Garcia Villa, was an admirer of her works, and included several of her short stories in his annual honor roll of short fiction. The novelist Juan Laya extolled her in 1951 as "one of the few remaining great pioneers of Philippine literature in English. Many of her stories remain unsurpassed in this day in sensitivity and depth of feeling."
