= Artificial Beauty =

- Also known as: Seikei Bijin
- Genre: Comedy
- Directed by: Meiji Fruta
- Starring: Ryoko Yonekura
- Country of origin: Japan
- Original language: Japanese
- No. of episodes: 11

Production
- Production location: Japan
- Running time: Tuesdays at 21:00 (JST)

Original release
- Network: Fuji Television
- Release: 9 April – 25 June 2002

Artificial Beauty (整形美人, Seikei Bijin) is a 2002 Japanese television drama that aired on Fuji Television.

== See also ==
- List of Japanese television dramas
