= Larry Cruz =

Larry J. Cruz
- Born: September 17, 1941; Commonwealth of the Philippines
- Died: February 4, 2008 (aged 66); Washington D.C., U.S.A.
- Occupation(s): journalist, restaurateur
- Known for: founder of LJC Restaurant Group

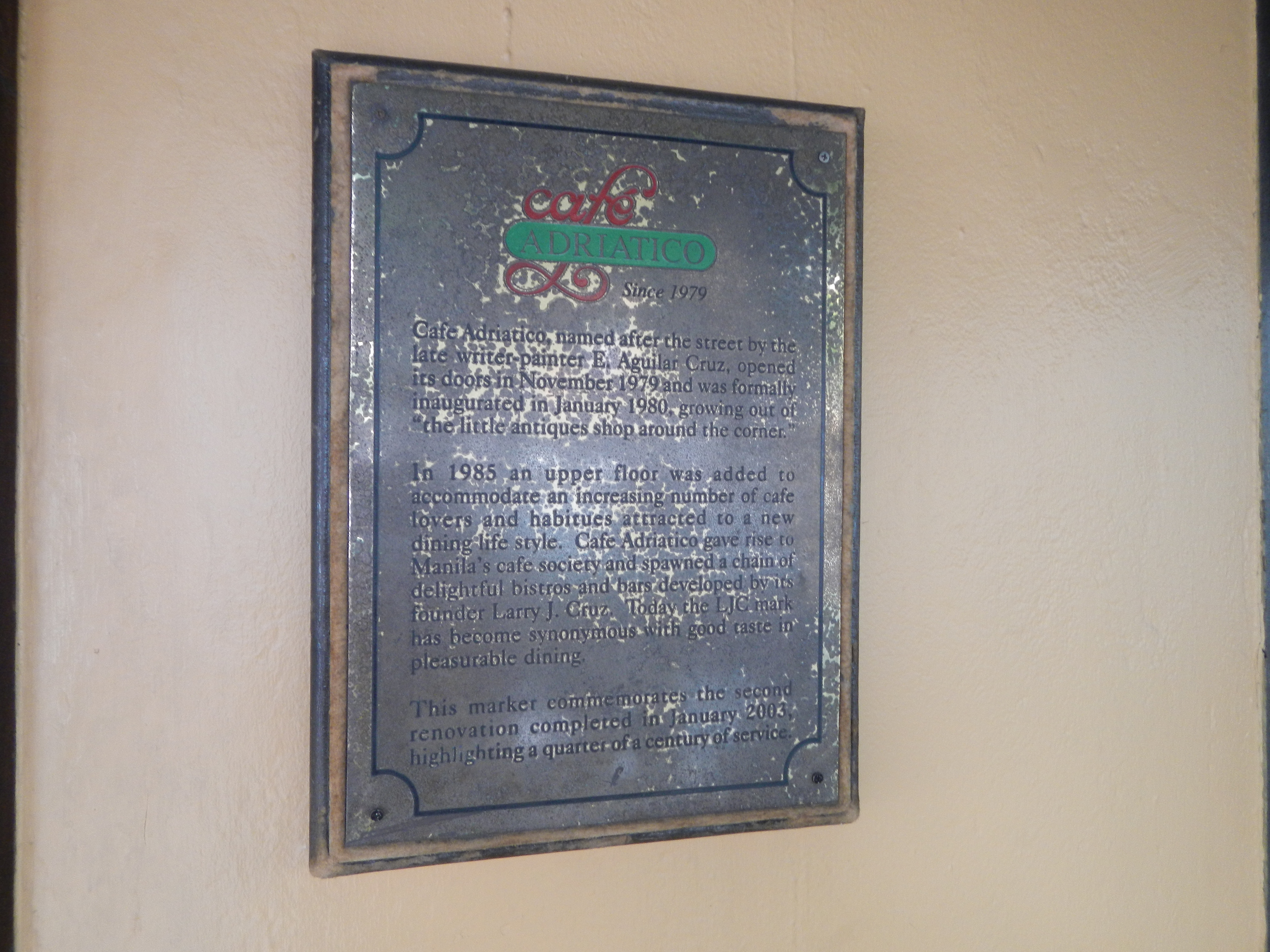
Café Adriatico-Cruz marker

Lorenzo "Larry" J. Cruz (September 17, 1941 – February 4, 2008) was a Filipino restaurateur who founded the LJC Restaurant Group, which operates several restaurants in the Philippines. Among the restaurants in the said group include Café Adriatico, Cafe Havana, Bistro Remedios, and Abe, which was named after his father, the writer E. Aguilar Cruz. Cruz was also a journalist and magazine publisher.

== Career ==
Before entering the restaurant business, Cruz was a reporter for the Manila Times and the Philippine Herald. In the 1960s, he joined the staff of a Hong Kong-based magazine. In the early years of the administration of Philippine President Ferdinand Marcos, Cruz was a member of the presidential press office.

Cruz, who was not a chef himself, established Café Adriatico in Malate, Manila in 1979. The venture proved successful and helped revitalize the Malate area other restaurants and cafes within the area. Cruz expanded this venture by opening of several other restaurants within Metro Manila. At the time of his death in 2008, he had opened fourteen restaurants in the Philippines. Several of his restaurants featured Filipino and Kapampangan cuisine.

In the late 1980s, Cruz published Metro Magazine, a city guide/political/lifestyle magazine inspired by New York Magazine and Vanity Fair. He later sold the magazine to Eugenio Lopez Jr. in order to finance his business expansion.

He died on February 4, 2008, of complications from cancer. He was hailed as the leading Filipino "pioneer in theme or concept restaurants" and the man who had "shaped Philippine café society".
