= Da Big Show =

2008 Philippine television game show

- Genre: Game show
- Presented by: Ogie Alcasid
- Country of origin: Philippines
- Original language: Tagalog

Production
- Executive producers: Marissa Flores; Katie Dalmacio
- Camera setup: Multiple-camera setup
- Running time: 30 minutes
- Production company: GMA Public Affairs

Original release
- Network: GMA Network
- Release: April 21, 2008 – July 2008

Da Big Show is a 2008 Philippine television game show broadcast by GMA Network. Hosted by Ogie Alcasid, it premiered on April 21, 2008. The show concluded in July 2008.

== Cast ==
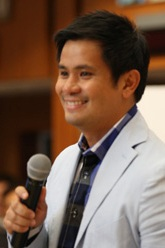
Ogie Alcasid served as the host.

Da Big Boss

- Ogie Alcasid

Da Big Boys

- More
- Less

Da Big Girls

- Crispy
- Batchy Boi
- Liempy
- Chunky
- Patty
- Roasty

== Gameplay ==
In Da Big Show, four teams (composed of three members each) compete in a series of games with the objective of being the last team standing. Each match consists of Philippine games with gigantic props.

For example, three members of each team being made to wear giant rubber slipper costumes to be able to tackle a giant can a la tumbang preso, players dressed as gigantic spiders suspended and trying to jostle each other off a platform 20 feet off the ground, and opposing teams trying to lift 30-pound concrete balls in a game of giant sungka.

The show's biggest challenge is a giant palayok that the winning team has to shatter for them to win the jackpot prize. Should the clay pot remain unbroken, the pot money will be added to the following day's jackpot prize.
