= Gaby's Xtraordinary Files =

- Genre: Educational
- Created by: ABS-CBN Studios
- Directed by: Dido Camara
- Presented by: Gaby Dela Merced
- Country of origin: Philippines
- Original language: Filipino
- No. of episodes: 10

Production
- Running time: 45 minutes
- Production company: ABS-CBN Studios

Original release
- Network: ABS-CBN
- Release: March 23 – June 8, 2008

Related
- Ka-Pete Na! Totally Outrageous Behavior; Bakbakan

Gaby's Xtraordinary Files is a Philippine television informative show broadcast by ABS-CBN. Hosted by Gaby Dela Merced. It aired from March 23 to June 8, 2008, replacing Ka-Pete Na! Totally Outrageous Behavior and replaced by Bakbakan.

== See also ==
- List of programs broadcast by ABS-CBN
