= Dolly Aglay =

Filipino business and financial journalist

Dolores “Dolly” Aglay-Elona (c.1967 – May 26, 2008) was a Filipino business and financial journalist who worked for the Manila news bureau of Reuters News Agency and the Philippine Star during her career.

Aglay joined Reuters as a business reporter in 1995. She had previously also worked as a business reporter for the Philippine Star. Aglay specialized in reporting on commodity stories, such as food pricing, while reporting for Reuters.

Aglay married Philippine Star reporter Melchior "Mel" Elona, and they had two children, Julian and Fides. She died of cancer, which she had been battling for almost 3 years, in Manila on May 26, 2008, at the age of 41. According to Elona, she had been disappointed that she could not report as actively on her stories while being treated for her illness. She "kept talking about missing out on one of the biggest commodities stories of recent years in the Philippines, the rise in rice prices over the past few months."

Aglay was buried at Heritage Memorial Park in Manila on Sunday, June 1, 2008.
