= Gilberto Teodoro Sr. =

Filipino civil servant (1927–2008)

Administrator of Social Security System
- In office January 1966 – February 1986
- President: Ferdinand Marcos

Personal details
- Born: Gilberto Ortiz Teodoro; May 7, 1927 Metro Manila, Philippines
- Died: February 22, 2008 (aged 80)
- Spouse: Mercedes Cojuangco
- Children: Gilbert Teodoro
- Relatives: Cojuangco family (by marriage)
- Education: Ateneo de Manila University (B.S.); University of the Philippines Diliman (M.A. & Ph.D.)
- Occupation: Government official

Gilberto Ortiz Teodoro Sr. (May 7, 1927 – February 22, 2008) was a former Social Security System administrator.

== Early life ==
Teodoro was born on May 7, 1927 in Tondo, Manila.

== SSS Administrator ==
Teodoro was administrator from January 1966 to February 1986, the longest to serve as head of the SSS, which was established in 1957. The agency was young when Teodoro became its head, and that most of the programs he initiated became the blueprint for SSS’ success.

Under Teodoro’s leadership, the agency was able to launch the Educational Loan, Calamity Loan, Investment Incentive Loan Program, Small-and Medium Scale Industries Loan Program, Study-Now-Pay-Later Plan and the three-month salary loan program. He also supervised the decentralization process of SSS operations, which speeded up processing of loans and benefits, and increased registration of wage earners and employers especially in rural areas.

The decentralization move had also allowed members to remit payments through authorized banks. Before the decentralization, members sent payments and membership applications through mail, or appear in person at the SSS head office in Diliman, Quezon City, a costly and time-consuming process especially for members from the provinces.

Teodoro first implemented SSS Medical Care (Medicare) program in 1972, which provided cash payments for medical, surgical and hospitalization expenses of members and their beneficiaries. Three years later, he launched the Employees’ Compensation (EC) program, which gave additional funds to members who suffered from work-related illnesses, disabilities and even death. The administration of the Medicare program was transferred to the Philippine Health Insurance Corporation in 1995, but the SSS has continued to provide EC benefits to members.

Also under Teodoro’s leadership, the SSS started granting funeral and maternity benefits and survivors and dependents pension in the 1970s. In 1973, SSS coverage was extended to overseas Filipino workers and in 1980 to self-employed persons.

SSS investment income during Teodoro’s term enabled the fund to increase benefits several times over despite a slow increase in contribution rates.

Moreover, SSS fund placements in various government banking institutions had yielded high returns, which helped spur economic growth and fund public infrastructure projects.

== Personal life ==
Gilbert Teodoro Sr. was married to Mercedes Cojuangco-Teodoro, a Batasang Pambansa member for Tarlac. Together, they have a son named Gilberto Jr., who would serve as National Defense Secretary.

== Death ==
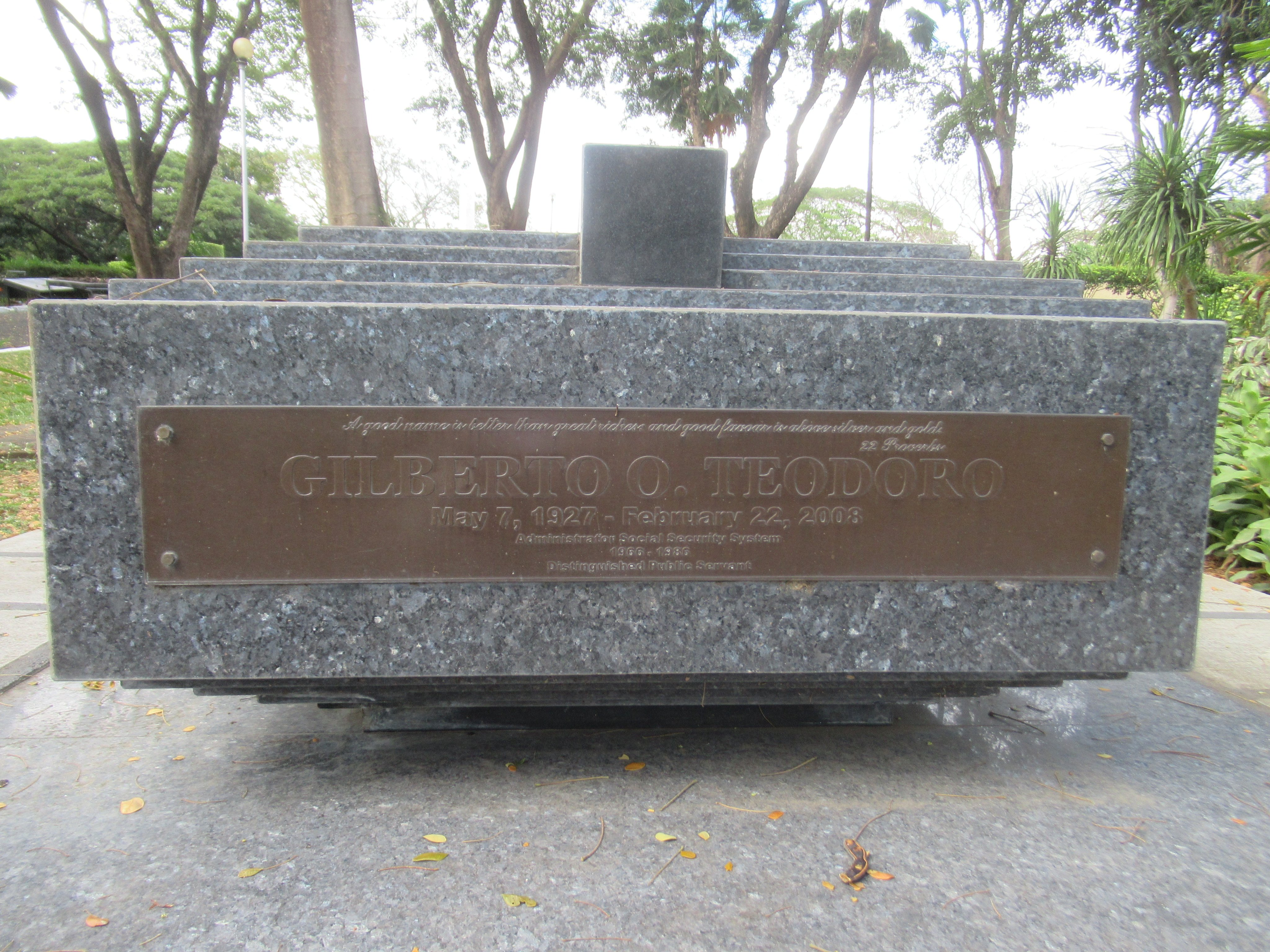
Teodoro Sr.'s grave at the Libingan ng mga Bayani.

Teodoro died at 4:45 a.m. at the Makati Medical Center in Makati due to multiple organ failure on February 22, 2008. He was interred on February 26, 2008, at the Libingan ng mga Bayani in Taguig.

At Tarlac Agricultural University (TAU), a gymnasium called Gilberto O. Teodoro Multi-purpose Center is named after him. The Camiling District Hospital in Camiling was also renamed to Gilberto O. Teodoro Memorial Hospital in his memory.
