= Mediatrix of All Grace offending religious feelings case =

2022 Filipino criminal lawsuit

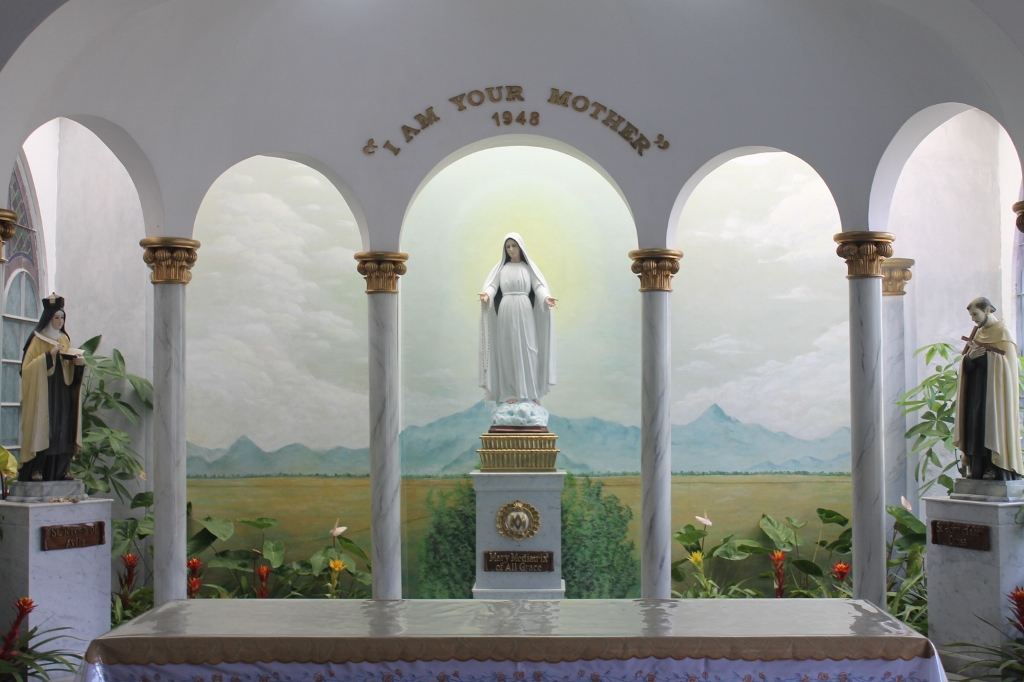
- Mary, Mediatrix of All Grace image at a chapel in Lipa, Batangas.
- Date: December 9, 2022 (case filed)
- Type: Criminal lawsuit
- Motive: Statements regarding the Mary, Mediatrix of All Grace
- Participants: Harriet Demetriou (complainant)
- Arrests: Winston Cabading (released on bail)
- Charges: Offending religious feelings
- Verdict: Pending

In December 2022, Harriet Demetriou, a devotee of the Mary, Mediatrix of All Grace apparition, filed a criminal case against exorcist priest Winston Cabading for offending religious feelings, a violation under the Revised Penal Code. This complaint was made over his prior statements referencing the Marian apparition in a conference and an online show which the complainant perceived to be a mockery against the devotion.

The priest was arrested in May 2023 but was later released on bail. In August 29, 2023, the Regional Trial Court in Quezon City found no offense committed. The court did not dismissed the case outright and asked Demetriou to revise information in her lawsuit within 30 days.

== Background ==
=== Mary, Mediatrix of All Grace ===
The offending religious feelings case involves the Mary, Mediatrix of All Grace, a Marian apparition believed by some faithful to have occurred in 1948. According to believers Mary, mother of Jesus appeared before Teresita Castillo a Carmelite postulant in Lipa, Batangas.

The Congregation for the Doctrine of the Faith of the Holy See ruled in 1951 that there is nothing miraculous regarding the apparition. The decision was approved by Pope Pius XII and was upheld by church leaders. Nevertheless, the Marian apparition still continues to have a following.

The reported Lipa apparition has long been a source of tension between the Catholic Church hierarchy and the devotees of what they call “Our Lady of Lipa.” Church leaders have repeatedly said nothing is miraculous about the 1948 apparition, but devotees like Demetriou have questioned such statements by bishops and priests.

=== Parties ===
The complainant of the offending religious feelings case, Harriet Demetriou is a former Commission on Elections chair, a retired judge who worked for the Sandiganbayan and a devotee of the Marian apparition.

The sued party is Winston I. Cabading, a Roman Catholic priest and an exorcist under the Archdiocese of Manila. He is also a theologian and part of the Dominican Order.

== Case ==
People of the Philippines vs. Winston Cabading
- Court: Regional Trial Court National Capital Judicial Region
- Full case name: People of the Philippines vs. Winston I. Cabading
- Decided: August 29, 2023
- Citation: CRIM. R-QZN-23-04124-CR

Case opinions
- No offense found. For possible amendment of the charge by the complainant
- Decision by: Madonna Echiverri

=== Arguments ===
In December 9, 2022, Harriet Demetriou filed a criminal lawsuit against exorcist priest Winston Cabading for "offending religious feelings" under the Revised Penal Code (RPC). She argued that Cabading, who she characterized as a "rabid critic" of the Marian apparition has made statements that would fulfill two of the following conditions for an offending religious feelings offense:

1. that the acts complained of were performed either in a place devoted to religious (sic) or during the celebration of any religious ceremony
2. that the acts must be notoriously offensive to the feelings of the faithful.

She took note on Cabading's statement at the 4th National Conference on the Ministry of Spiritual Liberation and Exorcism held in August 2019 on "how demons can appear to be holy". She inferred that it is an implicit reference to the Mediatrix of All Grace, a conclusion she holds would not need a "scholarly approach" to arrive to.

Demetriou also cited a May 28, 2022 episode of an online show featuring Brother Wendell Talibong. Fragrant oil that reportedly flows from a certain statue of the Mediatrix of Grace became a subject matter and the question if the oil was scientifically examined raised. Cabading's response was displayed "the statue is a Lipa statue, therefore, already suspect."

Demetriou argues that the conference constitute as a religious ceremony. Cabading dissents stating that the quoted statements were not made in a place of worship or a religious ceremony as required in the RPC.

The case was filed in the Quezon City Regional Trial Court (RTC) Branch 81. His arraignment was scheduled on June 1, 2023 The procedure was later postponed to August 1.

=== Arrest and status of Cabading ===
RTC 81 Judge Madonna Echiverri would issue a warrant of arrest against Cabading on May 8, 2023. The priest would be arrested on May 13 at the St. Magdalene House in Nasugbu, Batangas but would later post bail and granted provisional liberty on May 15.

The court tagged Cabading as a low flight risk taking note that he have returned to the Philippines in June 13 after an overseas trip made after he posted bail.

=== Findings ===
On August 29, 2023, RTC 81 found no offense committed and gave Demetriou 30 days to amend the information on her criminal charge against Cabading. The court noted that there was no object of veneration was damaged or destroyed by Cabading and that there was no "religious ceremony to speak of". It also stated that Cabading's statement were "not of his own but he was merely echoing what 'the Vatican said' or based on the dogma of the church". If the charge was not revised, the case could be dismissed.

On January 24, 2024, Makati Senior Assistant City Prosecutor Crystal Dei Embido-Buenaventura dismissed the Perjury case (Mediatrix of All Grace offending religious feelings case) for "insufficiency of evidence, since her complaint has no basis and there is no proof or document to support her claims."

In May 2024, the Quezon City Regional Trial Court Branch 224 acquitted Cabading stating that the priest's statement was not made in a "religious ceremony". The Court of Appeals affirmed the ruling on September 29, 2025.

== Reactions ==
=== Roman Catholic Church ===
Catholic Bishops' Conference of the Philippines (CBCP) President and Kalookan Bishop Pablo Virgilio David claimed responsibility believing the case and arrest of Cabading to be "indicative of our shortcomings as Church leaders in facilitating dialogue" and expressed disheartenment and perplexment over the legal case which has Catholics on both sides. The CBCP added that the issue caused "a scandal to the faithful" and has begged forgiveness from its constituents.

The CBCP issued a certificate of good standing on May 31, 2023 for Cabading affirming his positive stature within the church and that he is not under investigation by the body.

The Philippine Association of Catholic Exorcists has backed Cabading on his case with Demetriou, as well as the Archdiocese of Manila's Commission on Extraordinary Phenomena and Office of Exorcism. Several laity groups have also expressed support for Cabading.

On March 19, 2024, Archbishop Gilbert Garcera of the Roman Catholic Archdiocese of Lipa issued a circular stating that the Dicastery for the Doctrine of the Faith had found the 1951 decree rejecting the Lipa apparition, in which Sister Mother Mary Cecilia of Jesus, OCD, then the superior of the convent where the incident occurred, confessed deceiving the faithful about the alleged apparitions and asked for forgiveness. Despite the pronouncement, Demetriou expressed doubt over the letter's veracity.

=== Other reactions ===
Christian Monsod, one of the framers of the 1987 Constitution called for the abolishment of the "offending religious feelings" provision from the Revised Penal Code in response to the case believing it to "too overbroad" and was a "throwback to the age of Church intolerance and oppression" which prevailed in the Spanish colonial era. The latest effort to repeal the provision in the Congress was by then Senator Leila de Lima in 2019, a year after activist Carlos Celdran was convicted for his 2010 "Damaso" stunt to protest the Roman Catholic church's stance on the Reproductive Health Bill.

== See also ==
- Weeping crucifix in Mumbai, a similar blasphemy law incident over a purported weeping crucifix
