= Shooting of Gold Dagal =

Filipino comedian (1986–2025)

- Date: March 15, 2025
- Location: Mayari Restaurant, Angeles City, Philippines
- Motive: Under investigation
- Target: Gold Dagal
- Perpetrator: 3 unidentified men

Gold Dagal was a Filipino stand-up comedian who was the organizer of the Comedy Roast Battles PH.

On March 16, 2025, he was killed by unidentified assailants allegedly due to his standup comedy routines mocking the Iglesia ni Cristo, a religious sect in the Philippines.

== Background and career ==
Gold Dagal
- Born: Goldenier Cruz Dagal; 1986 or 1987
- Died: March 16, 2025 (aged 38); Angeles City, Philippines

Comedy career
- Years active: 2017–2025
- Genres: Stand-up; Roast
- Subjects: Iglesia ni Cristo; Commentaries on human rights and abuse of authority

Goldenier Cruz Dagal was born to Ronnie Dagal and Jocelyn Cruz. He had three sisters. A solo musician who looked for gigs through internet forums in 2017, Dagal transitioned to being a comedian. Aside from being a stand-up comic, Dagal had also participated in roast battles, establishing Comedy Roast Battles in 2018.

According to Cruz, Dagal's subject matter as a comedian involved topics that were "generally considered serious, taboo, or distressing" and cautioned his son that his dark humor might "alienate or offend others". A common topic of his comedy skits was religion, especially the Iglesia ni Cristo (INC), an influential Christian church. He also did social commentaries on human rights and abuse of authority. He also incorporated dirty jokes in his performance.

== Assassination ==
On March 15, 2025, past 9:00 pm (UTC+8), Dagal was at the Mayari Restaurant in Angeles City, Pampanga to perform for a comedy show when he was approached by three men wearing white and red shirts, ball caps and face masks. One of them fired multiple gunshots on Dagal. He was brought to a nearby hospital by fellow comedians in the event. He died nine hours later at the Angeles University Foundation Medical Center on the following day from ten cardiac arrests from attempts to resuscitate him.

A special task force was formed by the Philippine National Police for the case. Cartridge cases from a caliber .45 firearm were recovered by the police.

His mother alleged that a hired gunman was commissioned to kill Gold Dagal by people who "claim to be closest to God" who was offended by his jokes during a private performance. It was speculated that the INC was involved in Dagal's death, as he had been receiving death threats for his alleged digs on the INC.

== See also ==
- Offending religious feelings, blasphemy law-related offense in the Philippines
- Carlos Celdran
- Pura Luka Vega
