= Offending religious feelings =

Offending religious feelings could refer to:

- Offending religious feelings (Philippines)
- Offending religious feelings (Poland)
