= List of Philippine legal terms =

Owing to the unique history of the Philippines, its legal system is an equally unique blend of civil law (Spanish law), common law (American law), and, especially in Mindanao, Shariah law. Below is a list of Philippine legal terms:

Term	Literal translation	From	Definition and use
A.C., administrative case	N/A	English	A case brought under administrative law in the form of a quasi-judicial proceeding by an agency of a non-judicial branch of government, or, the Office of the Court Administrator. Normally, such cases are internal disciplinary matters—court cases criminal and civil can be brought alongside them if warranted.
academic	N/A	English	Moot—changed circumstances have rendered the case of intellectual interest only; no ruling will have a practical effect on the law or jurisprudence.
Act	N/A	English	When on its own, as in "Act No. 3815", a law passed by the defunct colonial-era Philippine Legislature.
A.M.	N/A	English	"Administrative matters" before the Supreme Court of the Philippines.
arguendo	asserting	Latin	"For the sake of argument", as in, "Even arguendo that R.A. 10175 applies, this case still should be dismissed due to a lapsed prescriptive period."
arresto mayor	major detention	Spanish	See Revised Penal Code § Title Three: Penalties.
arresto menor	minor detention	Spanish	See Revised Penal Code § Title Three: Penalties.
B.P.	nationwide law	Tagalog	Abbreviation for Batas Pambansa, the name for laws passed by the defunct unicameral Batasang Pambansa.
C.A.	N/A	English	Abbreviation for either Commonwealth Act and Court of Appeals, depending on context.
destierro	exile	Spanish	See Revised Penal Code § Title Three: Penalties.
eCourt	N/A	English	An electronic database of cases at the lower levels of the judiciary. eCourt was seldom used before the COVID-19 pandemic. Includes "eFiling", a way to submit pleadings and other court documents electronically.
E.O.	N/A	English	Abbreviation for Executive Order.
estafa	scam, fraud, racket	Spanish	Fraud
expediente	file, dossier	Spanish	As special rules apply to the release of the rollo, the office of each member of the Supreme Court is allowed to take a copy of the rollo. This is the expediente.
fallo	verdict failure (non-legal translation)	Spanish	The dispositive portion of a Court's ruling, coming at the very end of the ruling. Cf. conclusion. This word has the same meaning in the modern Spanish judicial system.
fiscal	prosecutor	Spanish	A prosecutor, either at the city or provincial level, or nationwide Department of Justice level. Cf. procurator fiscal.
G.R.	N/A	English	Abbreviation for General Register. See Case citation § Philippines.
IBP	N/A	English	Integrated Bar of the Philippines
information	N/A	English	An indictment. In the United States, which originated the term, there are grand juries, and indictments are more common, while an information is a rare type of criminal action brought in the absence of a grand jury. However, the Philippines has no grand juries (and, indeed, no juries of any kind), so "information" is essentially synonymous with "indictment".
intervenor-oppositor	N/A	English	An intervenor who opposes the case of the petitioner. Sometimes shortened to just "oppositor". Cf. petitioner-in-intervention.
JBC	N/A	English	Judicial and Bar Council
judge-at-large	N/A	English	A judge without a permanent sala. Under R.A. 11459, such judges have all the rights of regular RTC judges, and the same salaries. They are also chosen by the President upon the advice of the JBC as other RTC judges are.
MCTC	N/A	English	Municipal Circuit Trial Courts, a Municipal Trial Court that covers more than one municipality
MeTC	N/A	English	Metropolitan Trial Courts, a type of civil court below Regional Trial Courts
MTC	N/A	English	Municipal Trial Courts, a type of civil court below Regional Trial Courts
MTCC	N/A	English	Municipal Trial Courts in Cities, a type of civil court below Regional Trial Courts
OCA	N/A	English	Office of the Court Administrator
petitioner	N/A	English	A plaintiff.
petitioner-in-intervention	N/A	English	An intervenor who supports the case of the petitioner. Cf. intervenor-oppositor.
ponencia	report	Spanish	The Court's majority opinion.
ponente	speaker [at a meeting]	Spanish	The writer of the Court's majority opinion. Mostly used in the context of the Supreme Court, but can be used at the Regional Trial Court level.
prefatory statement	N/A	English	A statement which summarizes a legal document, similar to an abstract.
prisión correccional	corrective imprisonment	Spanish	See Revised Penal Code § Title Three: Penalties.
prisión mayor	major imprisonment	Spanish	See Revised Penal Code § Title Three: Penalties.
quasi-judicial agency	N/A	English	An agency of the executive branch that exercises some judicial functions and before which a minimum of due process is required. Cf. administrative case.
quo warranto	by what authority	Latin	See Quo warranto § Philippines.
R.A.	N/A	English	Abbreviation for Republic Act.
raffle	Original meaning: a type of lottery	English	The system by which cases are assigned to judges in multi-sala courts. As of 1974, "[n]o case may be assigned to any branch without being raffled." As of 2013, raffles can be conducted electronically via "eCourt". The gambling-related word "raffle" comes from the sources of randomness required by the Supreme Court: preferably a roulette wheel is to be used, but if that's not available, a bingo or jueteng tambiolo is permissible.
reclusión perpetua	perpetual seclusion	Spanish	See Revised Penal Code § Title Three: Penalties.
reclusión temporal	temporary seclusion	Spanish	See Revised Penal Code § Title Three: Penalties.
respondent	N/A	English	A defendant.
rollo	Original meaning: a set of documents rolled up for easier archival and transit, or a scroll	Spanish	Short for rollo de casación (cassation archive) or rollo de apelación (appeal archive), the rollo is the complete archive of a particular case, including documents received from a lower court and anything submitted regarding the case, directly to any Philippine court, though most often used in relation to the higher courts. The term has its origin in the Real Audiencia de Manila, and is still used in the modern Supreme Court of Spain (Tribunal Supremo) and Spanish judicial system. Cf. expediente.
RTC	N/A	English	Abbreviation for Regional Trial Court.
sala	courtroom	Spanish	Courtroom, though used only to refer to a specific branch of a Regional Trial Court, and not to refer to higher courts, unlike in Spain, where sala remains in use for all courts (e.g. in the set phrase la sala acuerda—lit. the chamber agrees, or to describe a division of the Spanish Supreme Court, e.g. la tercera Sala—"Branch №3".) An acting judge serving in a temporary or acting capacity is said to be without a sala. Some RTC branches have only a single sala. Also cf. judges-at-large.
SC	N/A	English	Supreme Court of the Philippines
SCC	See sharīʿah § Etymology	Arabic	Sharia Circuit Court
SDC	See sharīʿah § Etymology	Arabic	Sharia District Court
TRO	N/A	English	A temporary restraining order.
TSN	N/A	English	Transcript of stenographic notes. A court stenographer first takes down their notes in their preferred form of shorthand, e.g. Gregg shorthand, then produces a longhand transcript from it called a TSN.
UDK	N/A	English	An undocketed case, undocketed because, for example, the docket fee has not yet been paid. Undocketed cases are still numbered, and may be ruled on at the discretion of the court, for example, Fletcher v. Bureau of Corrections has no G.R. number, but is instead cited as UDK-14071.
