= Good conduct time allowance controversy =

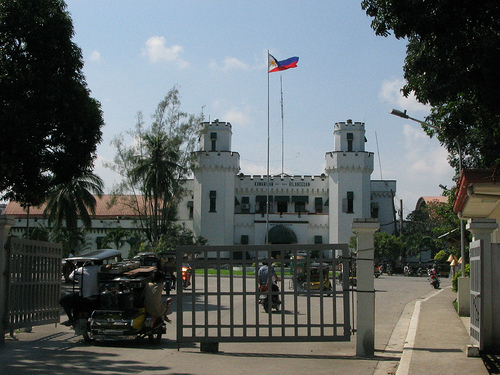
New Bilibid Prison where both Antonio Sanchez and the suspects of Chiong sisters murders are incarcerated

The good conduct time allowance (GCTA) controversy started in August 2019 involving the employees of the Bureau of Corrections (BuCor). It began when Bureau of Corrections Director General Nicanor Faeldon and several other government officials signed the document containing the release of former Calauan, Laguna Mayor Antonio Sanchez, who was convicted for the rape and murder of Eileen Sarmenta and her friend Allan Gomez in 1993, and Josman Aznar, Ariel Balansag, Alberto Caño and James Anthony Uy, who were convicted for the rape and murder of sisters Marijoy and Jacqueline Chiong in 1997, citing "good conduct."

The aftermath of release of convicts through GCTA subsequently led to investigation regarding the GCTA and to the BuCor personnel involved in the controversy.

== Background ==
On May 29, 2013, President Benigno Aquino III signed Republic Act No. 10592, also known as the Good Conduct Time Allowance (GCTA) Law. This law increases the number of days specified in the original 1930 provisions of the Revised Penal Code pertaining to GCTA.

Under the implementing rules and regulations of the GCTA Law, the Director of the Bureau of Corrections (BuCor), the Chief of the Bureau of Jail Management and Penology (BJMP), and the wardens of provincial, district, city, or municipal jails are authorized to grant remission of sentences to convicted persons based on their good behavior while serving their sentences in BuCor, BJMP, or other local jails.

== Controversies ==
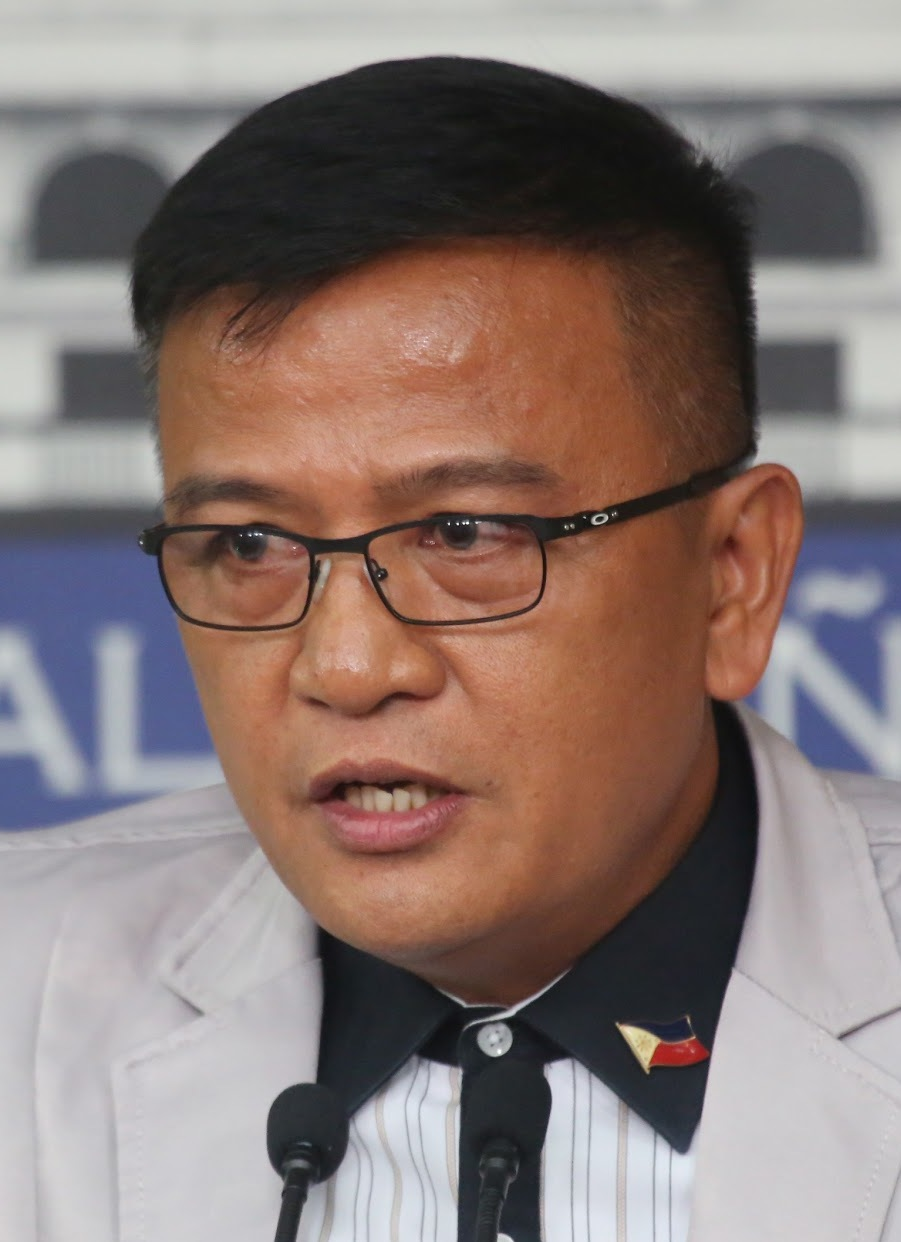
Faeldon was mainly involved in the controversy

=== Planned release of Antonio Sanchez ===
In August 2019, news reports stated that former Calauan, Laguna Mayor Antonio Sanchez, the suspect of raping and murdering Eileen Sarmenta and Allan Gomez in 1993, could have walked free from prison after spending 25 years in prison, according to a document bearing the signature of Bureau of Corrections director Nicanor Faeldon. The document said the release order was for one Antonio Leyza Sanchez, "who was found to have served 40 years upon retroactive application of RA No. 10592 and was certified to have no other legal cause to be further detained, shall be released from confinement." RA 10592 is the law allowing convicts an early release based on good conduct time allowance (GCTA).

On August 22, 2019, Sanchez, wearing formal outfit, is seen walking inside the prison along with the bodyguards. A social media post also claimed that Sanchez is spotted in his house in Calauan, Laguna two months ago. The impending release of Sanchez sparked nationwide outrage and condemnation. Prior to the issue, questions were raised over how could he qualify for good conduct when he was caught of seizing various items inside the prison such as P1.5 million worth of methamphetamine (shabu) hidden in a statue of the Blessed Virgin Mary in 2010 and an air-conditioning unit and flat-screen TV in 2015. Despite the outrage, BuCor Director General Nicanor Faeldon has changed tune and said Sanchez may be disqualified from the good conduct and time allowance (GCTA) rule based on several grounds.

On August 23, University of the Philippines Los Baños, the alma mater of Sarmenta and Gomez, held a rally to oppose the Sanchez's release. Among there present is the mother of Allan Gomez. Despite the Duterte administration denies the role of Sanchez release, Duterte's name can be seen written on their placards. The Supreme Court of the Philippines (SC), in a statement by spokesperson Brian Hosaka, denied ordering the release of Sanchez when it ruled on the retroactive application of RA 10592. Sanchez has maintained his innocence for the 1993 rape-slay of Sarmenta and the murder of Gomez and said he deserved to be freed. On August 26, President Rodrigo Duterte ordered Justice Secretary Menardo Guevarra and Bureau of Corrections chief Nicanor Faeldon not to release convicted rapist-murderer Antonio Sanchez.

Iluminada Gomez (The Mother of Allan Gomez) Said That The Gomez Family & The Sarmenta Family Has Read The Long Lost Paper That Contains The Letter of Former President Fidel Ramos That Written in August 1993 When He Was Condoling With Them Along With His Promise That The Government Would Do Anything To Give Financial Assistance to Them & Other Needs Mostly, Justice to Their Children & Holding Those Persons Accountable For The Double Murder of The Both 2 UP Los Baños Students in Which Mrs. Gomez Shown to The GMA News in August 2019.

On September 2, 2019, The Senate Blue Ribbon Committee holds a joint probe into the supposed early release of rape and murder convict Former Mayor Antonio Sanchez and the controversial Good Conduct Time Allowance (GCTA) Law. Bureau of Corrections chief Nicanor Faeldon confirms that George Medialdea, Rogelio Corcolon and Zoilo Ama, the three men who were convicted for the June 1993 rape and killing of Sarmenta and Gomez were already dead in jail. Senator Risa Hontiveros said that there are indications of GCTA system "is being corrupted" like the case of Sanchez.

On September 3, 2019, The family of rape and murder convict and former Calauan, Laguna Mayor Antonio Sanchez showed up at the Senate for the resumption of the probe into the controversy surrounding the possible release of their patriarch. The Sanchez family has maintain their intention that they will not pay the ₱12.6-million court-mandated damages to the families of Eileen Sarmenta and Allan Gomez who were murdered in 1993. Board of Pardons and Parole (BPP) executive director Reynaldo Bayang revealed in a Senate inquiry that Presidential spokesperson Salvador Panelo, who served as Sanchez's defense counsel in the high-profile 1993 Sarmenta-Gomez rape-slay case, wrote the BPP regarding Sanchez's application for executive clemency in a letter dated February 26. Presidential Spokesperson Salvador Panelo has confirmed a meeting with the family of his former client, convicted rapist-killer Antonio Sanchez, in Malacañang earlier this year. President Rodrigo Duterte has fired Bureau of Corrections chief Nicanor Faeldon after the latter approved the release of Sanchez.

=== The release of Chiong murders suspects ===
On August 30, 2019, Senator Panfilo Lacson stated that some of the convicts of the 1997 murder of the Chiong sisters are now out of prison. Faeldon has confirmed the release of Josman Aznar, Ariel Balansag, Alberto Caño and James Anthony Uy, the four persons who were convicted for the 1997 murder of the Chiong sisters. On September 4, President Rodrigo Duterte has fired Bureau of Corrections chief Nicanor Faeldon after the latter approved the release of three convicts in the murder case. On September 5, Chiong sisters' parents has called Duterte to return the three convicts back to prison. Eventually, the Chiong sisters' parents thanked to the President when the news of Duterte announcing that surrender of the released convicts for good conduct. The parents are also called for the investigation of Faeldon for his actions, in which Faeldon would be fired from his post by President Duterte.

On September 6, Ariel Balansag and Alberto Caño, two of the three convicts of the Chiong sisters rape-slay case, who were released by virtue of the controversial Good Conduct Time Allowance Law, has been surrendered to the authorities. On September 18, James Anthony Uy and Josman Aznar, the last two of the four convicts of the Chiong sisters rape-slay case, has finally surrendered to the authorities.

=== Absolute pardon of Joseph Scott Pemberton ===
The GCTA would also play a role in a different case several years later, as lawyer Rowena Garcia-Flores filed an urgent motion to the Olongapo City Regional Trial Court Branch 74 in late August 2020, requesting the release of Joseph Scott Pemberton, a US Marine convicted in the homicide of Filipino national Jennifer Laude in 2014. The grounds of the urgent motion stated that Pemberton should have been released from prison on July 31, 2020, after serving more than half of his 10-year sentence for displaying good conduct. This basis was provided by computations done by the BuCor, showing that the former US Marine has served a total sentence of eight years and ten months. In addition to this, Flores also stated that the BuCor did not give Pemberton any good conduct time allowances (GCTA) for over a year from October 22, 2014, to November 2015, stating that Pemberton did not receive any GCTA credits for the actual time he served from October 22 to December 18, 2014, and for the months of June and July 2020. However, the Laude family is opposed to the early release of Pemberton, stating that Pemberton was placed under solitary confinement, which does not count towards GCTA accreditation, and thus could not reasonably and justifiably claim good conduct.

Aside from the Laude family, the pardon sparked outrage in the LGBT community, as well as high-profile personalities from senators to celebrities. The hashtag #JusticeForJenniferLaude landed on the top trending spot in social media, where majority of the posts were critical of Duterte. Despite this, President Rodrigo Duterte officially gave Pemberton an absolute pardon on September 7, 2020. On September 11, 2020, several LGBT communities held a rally to protest Duterte's absolute of pardon of Joseph Scott Pemberton.

=== Other releases ===
Faeldon confirmed that at least 200 convicts have been released since June 2019. The data from BuCor showed that out of total 22,049 prisoners were freed since 2014 due to good conduct, there 1,914 prisoners who were convicted with heinous crimes have been released. On September 4, 2019, Duterte ordered all 1,914 convicts to surrender themselves, giving an ultimatum of 15 days, otherwise the police will hunt them down. On September 10, the police reported that 180 convicts who were released based on the good conduct have been surrendered. On September 17, Duterte has offered a reward of P1 million to those who could capture the freed convicts "dead or alive".

On September 20, the DOJ ordered to stop the re-arrests of freed convicts after discovering the errors on the list submitted to the BuCor. Over 2,000 convicts have voluntarily surrendered to the government out of listed 1,914 individuals. Explaining the erroneous data, Justice Undersecretary Markk Perete said that 41 of whom "were freed with no legal obstacle" or not via GCTA. The record also shows that 354 inmates were released under the Aquino administration while 1,429 inmates under the Duterte administration.

== Investigations regarding the GCTA ==
On September 6, an inmate's wife named Yolanda Camilon claimed that she was asked by BuCor employees a P50,000 in exchange for her husband's release from prison. On September 19, Bureau of Corrections (BuCor) Officer 3 Veronica Buño revealed that she exchanged conversation with Camilon via text messaging.

On September 9, Ombudsman Samuel Martires suspended BuCor officials for a period of six months.

== Reactions ==
On September 4, 2019, Duterte fired Faeldon from his duty for his actions. He was replaced by former Manila jail warden Gerald Bantag. On September 18, Senator Leila de Lima said that the agency needs a real leader who can fight against corruption.
