= Murders of Eileen Sarmenta and Allan Gomez =

1993 gang rape, torture, and killing incident in the Philippines

- Sarmenta (left) and Gomez (right)
- Location: Calauan, Laguna, Philippines
- Date: June 28, 1993
- Attack type: Kidnapping, rape, shooting
- Weapon: M16 rifle
- Deaths: Eileen Sarmenta and Allan Gomez
- Perpetrators: Antonio Sanchez; Luis Corcolon; Rogelio Corcolon; George Medialdea; Baldwin Brion; Pepito Kawit; Zoilo Ama
- Verdict: All perpetrators guilty (March 14, 1995)
- Convictions: Rape with homicide (7 counts each perpetrator)
- Sentence: Seven terms of reclusión perpetua for each perpetrator Civil indemnity: ₱3,432,650 actual damages sustained by the Sarmenta family; ₱3,484,000 actual damages sustained by the Gomez family; ₱2,000,000 as moral damages sustained by the Sarmenta family; ₱2,000,000 as moral damages sustained by the Gomez family; Attorneys fees and litigation expenses incurred by the victims' families

People of the Philippines v. Sanchez, et al.
- Court: Supreme Court of the Philippines en banc

Full case name
- The People of the Philippines, v. Mayor Antonio L. Sanchez, George Medialdea, Zoilo Ama, Baldwin Brion, Luis Corcolon, Rogelio Corcolon, and Pepito Kawit
- Decided: January 25, 1999
- Citation: G.R. Nos. 121039–45

Case history
- Appealed from: Pasig Regional Trial Court Branch 70: People of the Philippines v. Sanchez et al. (Criminal Case Nos. 93-124634–37)

Holding
- Ponente: Alicia Austria-Martinez, joined by Davide, Jr. (Chief Justice), Melo, Kapunan and Pardo
- Appeal dismissed, challenged witness testimony upheld, discrepancies do not "necessarily discredit witnesses". Fine raised from ₱50,000 to ₱700,000.

Antonio L. Sanchez v. Hon. Demetriou, et al.
- Court: Supreme Court of the Philippines en banc

Full case name
- Antonio L. Sanchez, v. The Honorable Harriet O. Demetriou (in her capacity as Presiding Judge of Regional Trial Court, NCR, Branch 70, Pasig), The Honorable Franklin Drilon (in his capacity as Secretary of Justice), Jovencito R. Zuño, Lonardo C. Guiyab, Carlos L. De Leon, Ramoncito C. Mison, Reynaldo J. Lugtu, and Rodrigo P. Lorenzo (the last six respondents in their official capacities as members of the State Prosecutor's Office)
- Decided: November 9, 1993
- Citation: G.R. No. 111771-77

Case history
- Prior action(s): Pasig Regional Trial Court Branch 70: People of the Philippines v. Sanchez et al. (Criminal Case Nos. 93-124634–37)

Holding
- Ponente: Isagani A. Cruz, joined by Feliciano, Padilla, Bidin, Regalado, Davide, Jr. (Chief Justice), Romero, Nocon, Melo, Quiason, Puno and Vitug (Narvasa took no part, Bellosillo was on leave)
- Allegation that the murder charge was "connected with the discharge of his functions as municipal mayor" dismissed, no bias on part of judge found.

People of the Philippines v. Sanchez, et al.
- Court: Pasig Regional Trial Court
- Branch: 70
- Decided: March 11, 1995
- Citation: Criminal Case Nos. 93-124634–3

Case history
- Appealed from: Manila Regional Trial Court Branch 7: People of the Philippines v. Sanchez et al. (Criminal Case Nos. 93-124634–37), arrest warrant issued, case sent to Pasig

Holding
- Ponente: Harriet Demetriou
- Sanchez guilty, sentenced to seven terms of reclusion perpetua

The murders of Eileen Sarmenta and Allan Gomez occurred on June 28, 1993, in Calauan, Laguna, Philippines. The case involved police personnel and Antonio Sanchez, the mayor of Calauan, who were tried and convicted of the crime. Sanchez was accused of masterminding the abduction of Sarmenta and her companion, Gomez, and the subsequent rape and murder of Sarmenta and the torture and murder of Gomez. The victims were both students of the University of the Philippines, Los Baños (UPLB).

== Incident ==
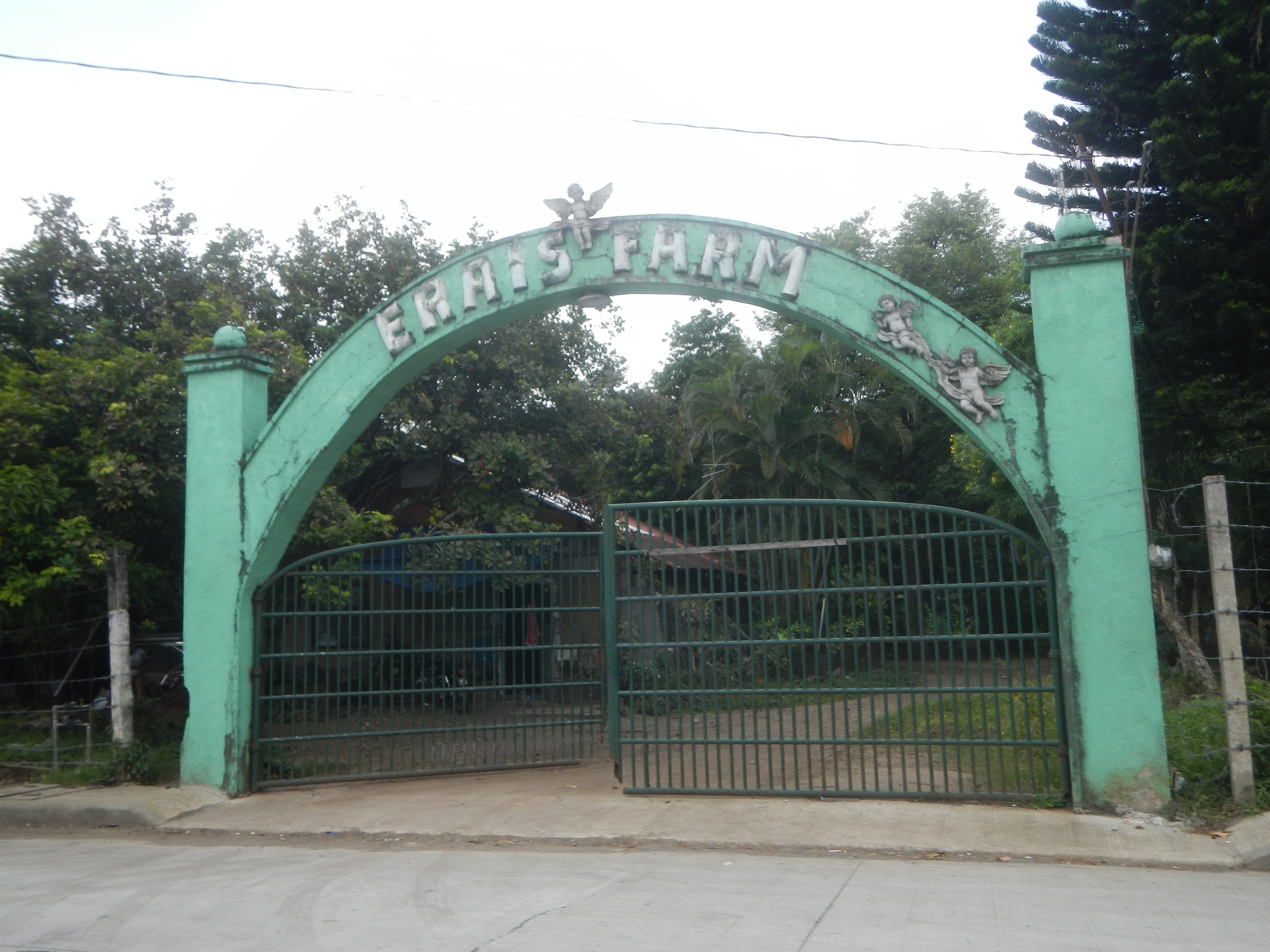
Erais Farm (pictured in 2019) where the rape and murder occurred

On the night of June 28, 1993, Eileen Sarmenta and Allan Gomez, both students of the University of the Philippines in Los Baños, were abducted by men of Calauan mayor Antonio Sanchez and forcibly shoved into a white vehicle.

The two were brought to Erais Farm in Barangay Curba, which was said to be owned by the mayor. Upon arriving there, Sarmenta was taken to Sanchez's room while Gomez was left to be beaten by the mayor's staff, namely Luis Corcolon, Rogelio "Boy" Corcolon, Zoilo Ama and George Medialdea. After that, Sanchez ordered the two men to bring Sarmenta and Gomez to a Toyota Tamaraw FX vehicle, which the suspects also boarded.

Jose "Pepito" Kawit followed up by striking Gomez's diaphragm with the butt of a rifle, causing Gomez to fall against a cement box. Brion thought Gomez was already dead, but Kawit said, "His death will come later."

Aurelio Centeno, who eventually became a star witness, joined Sanchez's personal aides Edwin Cosico and Raul Alorico to watch television at the adjacent resthouse. Alorico told Centeno that the mayor had been eagerly waiting for the group and was worried they would not arrive.

At around 1:00 a.m. of the next day, a crying Sarmenta was dragged out of the resthouse by Corcolon and Medialdea, her hair disheveled, mouth covered by a handkerchief, hands still tied, and stripped of her shorts. The mayor, clad only in a white polo, appeared and thanked Corcolon and Medialdea for the "gift". He said, "I am through with her. She's all yours". When asked what will happen to Gomez, Medialdea assured the mayor they would kill him for full measure. Sarmenta and Gomez were then loaded in the Tamaraw van by the appellants and headed for Calauan, followed closely by an ambulance. Kawit finished off Gomez with a single gunshot from his rifle.

The men then stopped at a sugarcane field in Sitio Paputok, Kilometro 74 of Barangay Mabacan, and gang-raped Sarmenta. Kawit invited Centeno to join but Centeno refused as he could not, in conscience, bear the assault being committed on Sarmenta.

At the end of the gang-rape, the six men decided to shoot Sarmenta in the face in order to hide their crime. When Sarmenta cried while kneeling and pleaded to the six men to spare her life, she said to them, "Please, you have taken everything from me. My shame, my honor. But please, spare me my breath. It's the only thing I've got left."

Corcolon gagged Sarmenta's mouth with a handkerchief and fired his rifle at her face, causing her instant death, and ordered Centeno to get rid of Sarmenta's body. However, the dead body of Sarmenta remained inside the van, her face bearing the gunshot wound, her mouth stuffed with a handkerchief, her melon orange t-shirt rolled up to her shoulders exposing her chest and her underwear pushed down near her white rubber shoes.

Following separate investigations by different law enforcement agencies, prosecutors pursued charges against Sanchez and his men, but did not include Teofilo "Kit" Alqueza, son of Gen. Dictador Alqueza, as respondents. Sanchez had claimed Alqueza was the mastermind.

== Investigation ==
On June 29, 1993, after Sarmenta's mother, Clara Sarmenta, received a phone call from someone else, they arrived at the site where they found Sarmenta's body inside the white van. In an examination conducted by PNP Crime Laboratory Office, it was found out that Sarmenta had been raped before being killed. Meanwhile, the body of Gomez was found in the grassy area in another village in Calauan, Laguna; Gomez sustained two gunshot wounds: one in the head and one in the back.

The two men later surrendered at the police headquarters where they identified themselves as the personnel of Sanchez. They also explicitly pointed the finger at Sanchez as the mastermind of murder and killing of the two victims.

The case was considered to be the most challenging for the investigators, due to the witnesses incriminating Sanchez and his men for the case. A vehicle, a Toyota Tamaraw FX, used in the kidnapping of Sarmenta and Gomez was surrendered to the police. It was not before that, after they committed the crime, the vehicle was cleaned in front of the Calauan municipal hall. The authorities found a spent cartridge near the body of Gomez.

== Convictions ==
On March 14, 1995, Pasig Judge Harriet Demetriou concluded the 16-month Sarmenta–Gomez murder trial with the finding that Calauan mayor Antonio Sanchez and several henchmen (only some of whom were policemen) were guilty of raping and murdering Sarmenta and killing Sarmenta's friend. Demetriou, in her 132-page decision, described the crime as being borne out of a "plot seemingly hatched in hell." At the time of his conviction, the Philippines had the death penalty, which was briefly reinstated due to public anger over crime. Demetriou indicated that she would've sentenced both Sanchez and his bodyguard to deaths were it not for the fact that the murders were committed barely six months before the law went into effect on December 31, 1993.

Sanchez received (7) terms of reclusion perpetua (40 years per term) for the crime. On January 25, 1999, the Philippine Supreme Court affirmed the decision of the Regional Trial Court. On August 29, 1999, Sanchez was given a double life term by the Supreme Court for a different case (Murders of Nelson & Rickson Peñalosa in 1991).

== Release order controversy and death of Sanchez ==
A report by GMA News showed that Sanchez could have walked free in August 2019, according to a document bearing the signature of then-Bureau of Corrections director Nicanor Faeldon.

The document said the release order was for one Antonio Leyza Sanchez, "who was found to have served 40 years upon retroactive application of RA No. 10592 and was certified to have no other legal cause to be further detained, shall be released from confinement." RA 10592 is the law allowing convicts an early release based on good conduct time allowance (GCTA).

Sanchez's kin had said they were informed about Sanchez's impending release, but public outrage prompted the government to review the GCTA law. On September 4, 2019, President Rodrigo Duterte fired Nicanor Faeldon for approving the release of Sanchez.

On March 27, 2021, Sanchez was pronounced dead on arrival at the New Bilibid Prison Hospital, his cause of death is still unknown, he was 74.

== Adaptation in popular culture ==
Mayor Sanchez's involvement in the Sarmenta–Gomez murder case was the inspiration for the 1994 film Humanda Ka Mayor!: Bahala Na Ang Diyos!. The film, produced by Regal Films and Golden Lions Productions, is based on Mayor Sanchez's account, with his name in the film changed to Mayor Miguel Beltran was portrayed by Dick Israel, and criminal activities. Sunshine Cruz portraying Sarmenta and Jeffrey Santos portraying Gomez.

The case was first featured on Philippine crime docudrama program S.O.C.O. in 2006, and in 2019, dubbed as the "Sarmenta-Gomez Rape-Slay Case."

The case was also featured on a Philippine crime documentary program Crime Klasik as its first episode, "Ex-Mayor Antonio Sanchez Case."

The case was also featured on a Philippine investigative docudrama program Imbestigador as its 34th episode, "Gomez-Sarmenta Rape-Slay and Murder Case.", Mayor Antonio Sanchez was portrayed by Jim Pebanco. Sanya Lopez portraying Sarmenta and Juancho Trivino portraying Gomez.

The 2024 Metro Manila Film Festival entry "Uninvited", starring the Philippines’ Star for All Seasons Vilma Santos-Recto, Lotlot De Leon, Elijah Canlas, Gabby Padilla, Nadine Lustre, and Aga Muhlach was loosely inspired by the rape-slay crime of Mayor Antonio Sanchez.

== Timeline of the murder case ==
- Night of June 28–29, 1993 – Mayor Antonio Sanchez's six henchmen kidnapped Eileen Sarmenta and Allan Gomez, just outside the UP Los Baños campus, and presented the girl to him as a "gift" in a farm rest house in Laguna. The mayor raped Sarmenta, handed her over to the six to be raped again before she was shot in the face, according to court records.
- August 13, 1993 – Mayor Sanchez was arrested, but maintained he was innocent. He then accused Kit Alqueza, son of Gen. Dictador Alqueza, who was charged of masterminding Gomez's killing.
- September 12, 1993 – The court formally read the case against Sanchez, along with the six henchmen: Then Calauan deputy chief of police George Medialdea, Luis Corcolon, Rogelio Corcolon, Zoilo Ama, Pepito Kawit, and Baldwin Brion.
- January 25, 1995:
  - In a hearing, Sanchez denied the allegations against him.
  - Sanchez's lawyers Mario Ongkiko, Antonio Bucoy, and Ernesto Brion begged off from the case following a "serious professional disagreement". Among those left to tend for the cases were Salvador Panelo, now chief presidential legal adviser, and Marcelino Arias.
- March 14, 1995 – Judge Harriet Demetriou of the Pasig Regional Trial Court Branch 70, founds Sanchez and several henchmen guilty of the rape-slay and sentenced them to seven terms of reclusión perpetua (up to 40 years of imprisonment for each term). The Calauan mayor was also told to pay millions in damages to the Gomez and Sarmenta families.
- January 25, 1999 – The Supreme Court affirmed the decision of the Regional Trial Court that convicts Sanchez and several henchmen for the deaths of Sarmenta and Gomez.
- October 10, 2006 – During a surprise inspection, authorities found methamphetamine and marijuana inside Sanchez's jail. He was charged with possession of illegal drugs.
- July 2010 – Sanchez was caught again with ₱1.5 million worth of methamphetamine concealed in a statue of the Virgin Mary.
- November 2015 – An air conditioning unit and a flat-screen TV were also seized from him during a raid.
- June 25, 2019 – The Supreme Court decides to void certain portions of RA No. 10592, which grants additional good conduct time allowance to inmates, thereby making its application retroactive instead of prospective.
- August 20, 2019 – Bureau of Corrections Director General Nicanor Faeldon announced that Sanchez was likely to be released in two months, which according to Justice Secretary Menardo Guevarra was due to a law passed in 2013 increasing good conduct time allowance and a Supreme Court (SC) decision applying this law retroactively.
- August 21, 2019:
  - Ma. Clara Sarmenta, Sarmenta's mother, said they plan to appeal the possible release of Sanchez, adding she was "shocked" after being informed that the convicted killer of her daughter was a candidate for release.
  - News of Sanchez's possible release has since sparked outrage especially from social media.
- August 22, 2019:
  - Students and alumni of the University of the Philippines Los Baños, the alma mater of Sarmenta and Gomez, held a rally to protest Sanchez's supposed release.
  - Amid rumors that Sanchez had freely been in and out of prison, prison guards allowed the media to take fresh photos of the convicted murderer.
  - Despite the outrage, BuCor Director General Nicanor Faeldon has changed tune and said Sanchez may be disqualified from the good conduct and time allowance (GCTA) rule based on several grounds.
- August 23, 2019:
  - Women's group Gabriela holds a rally in front of the Department of Justice to express their rejection of the government's decision to give Sanchez an early release from prison.
  - The SC, in a statement by spokesperson Brian Hosaka, denied ordering the release of Sanchez when it ruled on the retroactive application of RA No. 10592.
  - Mayor Sanchez has maintained his innocence for the 1993 rape-slay of Sarmenta and the murder of Gomez and said he deserved to be freed.
- August 26, 2019 – President Rodrigo Duterte ordered Justice Secretary Menardo Guevarra and Bureau of Corrections chief Nicanor Faeldon not to release convicted rapist-murderer Antonio Sanchez.
- September 2, 2019:
  - The Senate Blue Ribbon Committee holds a joint probe into the supposed early release of rape and murder convict Former Mayor Antonio Sanchez and the controversial Good Conduct Time Allowance (GCTA) Law.
  - Bureau of Corrections chief Nicanor Faeldon confirms that George Medialdea, Rogelio Corcolon and Zoilo Ama, the three men who were convicted for the June 1993 rape and killing of Sarmenta and Gomez were already dead in jail.
- September 3, 2019:
  - The family of rape and murder convict and former Calauan, Laguna Mayor Antonio Sanchez showed up at the Senate for the resumption of the probe into the controversy surrounding the possible release of their patriarch.
  - The Sanchez family has maintain their intention that they will not pay the ₱12.6-million court-mandated damages to the families of Eileen Sarmenta and Allan Gomez who were murdered in 1993.
  - Board of Pardons and Parole (BPP) executive director Reynaldo Bayang revealed in a Senate inquiry that Presidential spokesperson Salvador Panelo, who served as Sanchez's defense counsel in the high-profile 1993 Sarmenta–Gomez rape-slay case, wrote the BPP regarding Sanchez's application for executive clemency in a letter dated February 26.
  - Presidential Spokesperson Salvador Panelo has confirmed a meeting with the family of his former client, convicted rapist-killer Antonio Sanchez, in Malacañang earlier this year.
- September 4, 2019 – President Rodrigo Duterte has fired Bureau of Corrections chief Nicanor Faeldon after the latter approved the release of Sanchez who was convicted in the June 1993 rape and murder of Eileen Sarmenta and Allan Gomez.
- February 5, 2020 – The Senate Blue Ribbon Committee, has recommended the filing of criminal charges against former Bureau of Corrections Director General Nicanor Faeldon, three BuCor officials and three New Bilibid Prison officials, who were involved in the Good Conduct Time Allowance controversy, including the near-release of former Calauan, Laguna mayor Antonio Sanchez, the mastermind in the June 1993 rape and murder of UPLB students Eileen Sarmenta and Allan Gomez.
- March 27, 2021 – Former Calauan, Laguna mayor Antonio Sanchez, the mastermind in the June 1993 rape and murder of UPLB students Eileen Sarmenta and Allan Gomez, died in prison at the age of 74, his cause of death is still unknown.

== See also ==
- Chiong murder case
- List of kidnappings (1990–1999)
