= Monsod =

Monsod is a surname. Notable people with the surname include:

- Christian Monsod (born 1936), Filipino lawyer
- Winnie Monsod (born 1940), Filipino economist
