= Weeping crucifix in Mumbai =

Statue in Mumbai, India

- Location: Mumbai (Bombay), India
- Material: Wood

The Weeping crucifix in Mumbai is a statue of the crucified Jesus in Mumbai (Bombay) which attracted widespread attention in 2012 after it was reported that water was seeping out of the statue's feet. Members of the local Catholic community believed the incident to be a miracle; a skeptic-rationalist and atheist author Sanal Edamaruku, provided evidence that the water stemmed from a faulty sewage system, which seeped due to capillary action. Edamaruku additionally accused Latin Christian priests of regularly scamming devotees and defrauding miracles to make money in order to build bigger and newer churches or convents, and mocked the Pope as "anti-science". A church representative admitted Edamaruku had the "right to doubt" and Christian activists said that the backlash was not for debunking the alleged "miracle", but for the defamatory statements made on live television. After which he became subsequently subject to multiple first information reports (FIR) under blasphemy laws. A Catholic lawyer and the Roman Catholic Archdiocese of Bombay called for him to apologise for the comments. He migrated to Finland to avoid being arrested under the blasphemy law.

== Phenomenon ==
On 5 March 2012, the feet of a statue of a crucified Jesus in Irla near to the Church of Our Lady of Velankanni (Mumbai) started dripping water and was discovered by a woman who reported it to the local parish priest; the dripping stopped on 8 March. The parish priest of the church, Augustine Palett, stated "whether science can explain what happened or not, a miracle did occur in Irla, namely that of having dozens of Christians, Hindus and Muslims pray together under the cross."

On 12 March, Agnelo Gracias, the auxiliary bishop of Mumbai, stated: "One can doubt if this has a supernatural cause. I have not seen the cross yet. It is quite possible that water dripping from it may have a natural explanation."

== Scientific explanation ==
The Indian rationalist Sanal Edamaruku was invited to investigate by TV9 of Mumbai with the consent of the church authorities. He went with an engineer to the site where the alleged miracle had happened, and traced the source of the drip to the rear side. Edamaruku found that the water was seeping through the feet because of capillary action and faulty plumbing. Moisture on the wall where the statue was mounted seemed to be coming from an overflowing drain, which was in turn fed by a pipe that issued from a nearby toilet.

In a debate on TV9, Bishop Agnelo Gracias from Mumbai said, "We will never say it is a miracle. The church will investigate and investigate very carefully." He said it was possible this particular incident had "natural causes" and agreed that Edamaruku has a "right to doubt."

== Aftermath ==
After Edamaruku's televised comments mocking the Catholic Church and the Pope, Catholic Secular Forum filed 17 first information reports against Edamaruku under IPC section 295-A, a blasphemy law of India. The Roman Catholic Archdiocese of Bombay was not involved with the criminal charges, but issued a statement asking for his apology; they also asked for the prosecution to drop the charges. The All India Catholic Union said the law was being applied incorrectly. Colin Gonsalves, the founder of the India Center for Human Rights and Law, stated his opinion that no criminal offence had been committed. There were further complaints that the law was being misused to suppress free speech. Vishal Dadlani and James Randi spoke publicly in support of Edamaruku. On 31 July 2012, Edamaruku left India and settled in Finland. As of 2014, the Catholic Secular Forum were still saying they would call for his prosecution if he returned to India.

== See also ==
- Mediatrix of All Grace offending religious feelings case
- Weeping statue
