= Alfredo Benipayo =

Filipino academic

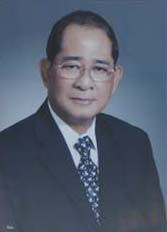

Chairman of the Commission on Elections
- In office February 19, 2001 – June 4, 2002
- Appointed by: Gloria Macapagal Arroyo
- Preceded by: Harriet Demetriou
- Succeeded by: Benjamin Abalos

Solicitor General of the Philippines
- In office November 10, 2002 – March 31, 2006
- Appointed by: Gloria Macapagal Arroyo
- Preceded by: Carlos N. Ortega (Acting)
- Succeeded by: Antonio Nachura

Personal details
- Born: Alfredo Logronio Benipayo; December 10, 1938 (age 87) Manila, Commonwealth of the Philippines

Alfredo Logronio Benipayo (born December 10, 1938) is the former Dean of the University of Santo Tomas Faculty of Civil Law, the oldest law school in the Philippines. He is a former magistrate and a respected law professor and bar reviewer in the country.

== Early life and education ==
Benipayo was born in Manila. His parents are Celedonio A. Benipayo, who was born in Polangui, Albay and Amada Logronio, from Bacon, Sorsogon. He is married to Rowena Hizon Castro, daughter of the late Chief Justice Fred Ruiz Castro, 1976–1979. The spouses Benipayo, are blessed with children Maria Cristina (Tina), Alfredo Ramon, Jr. (Oggie), Maria Beatrice Regina (Triccie), Maria Bianca Rebecca (Becca) and Maria Elissa Veronica (Rica).

Benipayo graduated elementary at Francisco Balagtas Elementary School (1945–1950), and high school at the University of Santo Tomas (1950–1954). He earned his Bachelor of Arts, at UST (1954–1958) magna cum laude, and his Bachelor of Laws (LL.B.) degree from the University of Santo Tomas Faculty of Civil Law (1958–1962), cum laude. He passed the Philippine Bar Examination in September 1962 with 79.5% bar rating.

== Career ==
Benipayo has practiced law for several years. From February, 1963 to December, 1972, he was Associate Attorney of the Jose W. Diokno Law Office, and Senior Partner, from January 1, 1973, to October 5, 1974, of the Reyes & Benipayo Law Office. He was appointed District Judge; V-EJ CFI, Malolos, Bulacan from October 6, 1974, to July 2, 1976. He became a District Judge, CFI, Manila from July 3, 1976, to January 17, 1983, and President Judge, RTC, Manila From January 18, 1973, to February 3, 1987.

From February 4, 1987, to October 29, 1996, he was an Associate Justice of the Philippine Court of Appeals, the second highest judicial court in the Philippines, next only to the Supreme Court. On October 30, 1996, to February 15, 2001, Benipayo was later appointed as Court Administrator of the Supreme Court of the Philippines, an office tasked to oversee the operations of the highest judicial court in the country. From February 16, 2001, to June 5, 2002, he was later appointed as Chairman of the Philippine Commission on Elections, an independent agency handling all local and national elections in the country. He was succeeded by Benjamin Abalos. Failing to get the Senate of the Philippines Commission of Appointment's confirmation, Benipayo was not re-appointed Chair of the COMELEC and instead was named Solicitor General by President Gloria Macapagal Arroyo, on October 16, 2002, as the official lawyer of the Philippine government and all its branches. In April 2006, Benipayo tendered his resignation from this post.

The Judicial and Bar Council nominated Benipayo for the Supreme Court of the Philippines Associate Justice post, 7 times, but he failed to sit upon the coveted golden throne. On April 1, 2006, Alfredo L. Benipayo tendered his resignation amidst a series of controversies.

== Academe ==
Benipayo has been teaching law as an associate professor at the University of Santo Tomas Faculty of Civil Law (since 1963) and other law schools and bar review centers in the country. In 2007, he was appointed as Dean of the Faculty. He is also the Chairman of the Remedial Law Department at the Philippine Judicial Academy, the official training school of justices, judges, and judiciary candidates in the country.

Preceded by Harriet Demetriou	COMELEC Chairman; 2001–2001	Succeeded by Benjamin Abalos
