= Bernardo P. Pardo =

Filipino judge (1932–2025)

The Honorable Bernardo Pardo
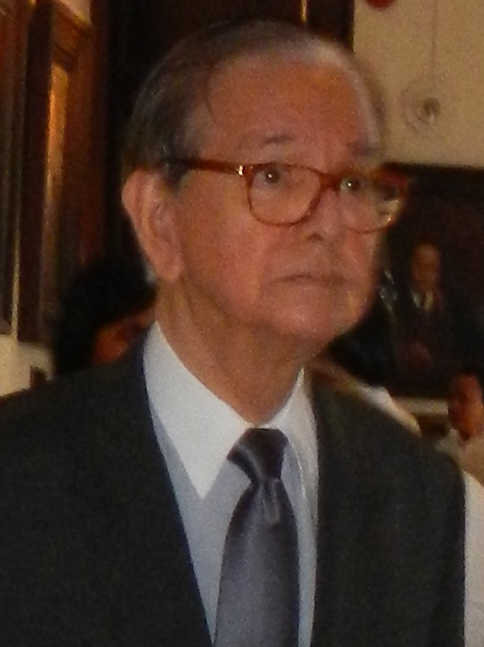

142nd Associate Justice of the Supreme Court of the Philippines
- In office September 30, 1998 – February 11, 2002
- Appointed by: Joseph Estrada
- Preceded by: Ricardo J. Francisco
- Succeeded by: Alicia Austria-Martinez

Chairman of the Commission on Elections
- In office February 17, 1995 – October 8, 1998
- Appointed by: Fidel Ramos
- Preceded by: Christian Monsod
- Succeeded by: Luzviminda Tancangco

Personal details
- Born: February 11, 1932 Manila, Philippine Islands
- Died: December 10, 2025 (aged 93)
- Spouse: Zenaida C. de Dios
- Profession: Lawyer

Bernardo Pardo (February 11, 1932 – December 10, 2025) was an associate justice of the Supreme Court of the Philippines and a Comelec Chairman. He was appointed by President Joseph Estrada.

== Early life and education ==
Pardo was born in Manila, to San Isidro, Nueva Ecija natives, Dr. and Mrs. Leopoldo G. Pardo, and was married to Zenaida C. De Dios, with whom he had four children.

He graduated high school at Letran College, with honors, in 1950. He was a graduate of Law from the University of Santo Tomas in 1955, and passed the bar examinations with a bar rating of 81.55%, on March 6, 1956. He was a fellow at the Academy of American and International Law, at the University of Texas, in 1978.

== Associate Justice ==
Pardo practiced law, by having been a lawyer in Jose W. Diokno Law Office, 1955–1961. He was Solicitor, in the Office of the Solicitor General, 1971–1974. He was Acting City Judge, Manila, 1965–1967. He was CFI Judge of Caloocan, from 1974 to 1983, RTC Judge of Manila, Br. 43, from 1983 to 1993, and CA Justice from 1993 to 1995. He was promoted to Chair of the COMELEC from 1995 until his appointment to the Supreme Court in 1998.

He was appointed by Joseph Estrada on September 30, 1998. He retired on February 11, 2002.

== Death ==
Pardo died on December 10, 2025, at the age of 93.

== See also ==
- Commission on Elections (Philippines)

Preceded by Christian S. Monsod	COMELEC Chairman; February 1995 – October 1998	Succeeded by Luzviminda Tancangco
