= Luzviminda Tancangco =

Chairman of the Commission on Elections
- Acting
- In office October 8, 1998 – January 10, 1999
- Appointed by: Joseph Estrada
- Preceded by: Bernardo P. Pardo
- Succeeded by: Harriet Demetriou

Commissioner of the Commission on Elections
- In office August 5, 1998 – February 2, 2004
- Appointed by: Joseph Estrada

Personal details
- Born: Bustos, Bulacan
- Affiliation: Tau Gamma Sigma

Luzviminda Gaba Tancangco is the first non-lawyer woman commissioner of the Philippine Commission on Elections. She was its second female acting chairperson (1998–1999) after Haydee Yorac.

== Service ==
She served from 1998 to 2004, and is one of the six women to have been appointed to the Commission as of 2014.

== Controversies ==
GMANews.TV reported that in August 2002, "NAMFREL and other civil society organizations" filed an "impeachment complaint" against "COMELEC Commissioner Luzviminda Tancangco", and that the complaint was "endorsed by Rep. Monico Puentevella". The Congress of the Philippines dismissed the complaint on February 3, 2003 and found it "not sufficient in substance". Ms. Tancangco continued to serve on the COMELEC until February 2, 2004.

Government offices
Preceded by Bernardo P. Pardo	COMELEC Chairman; October 08, 1998– January 10, 1999	Succeeded by Harriet Demetriou
