= Catholic Secular Forum =

Mumbai-based Catholic institution

Catholic Secular Forum (CSF) is a Mumbai-based Catholic institution. As of 2008 the General Secretary was Joseph Dias, who believes that “India is not yet culturally or socially ready for such freedoms that West or Americas have [sic].”

The organization has been outspoken on a range of issues, with a particular focus on arts and media. For example, the CSF said that "The Da Vinci Code is offensive as it hit certain basic foundations of the religion."

In 2006, the group opposed the cover artwork of the American thrash metal band Slayer's album, Christ Illusion.

In 2012, the group opposed the Hindi film Kyaa Super Kool Hain Hum over the use of the name "Rosemary Maarlo", which translates from the Hindi "रोज़ मेरी मार लो" to "screw me every day please".

In 2015, the group opposed a play called Agnes of God in Mumbai. The play is a story of a novice nun called Agnes who gives birth and then insists the child is the result of a virgin conception. It was written by American playwright John Pielmeier in 1979. A letter signed by 70 prominent Indian citizens, including Christians, condemned the CSF's call for a ban.

== Controversies ==
=== FIRs against Sanal Edamaruku ===
During the Weeping crucifix in Mumbai, Sanal Edamaruku provided evidence that the water stemmed from a faulty sewage system and accused Latin Christian priests of regularly scamming devotees and defrauding miracles to make money in order to build bigger and newer churches or convents, and mocked the Pope as "anti-science". In response to these statements, the Catholic Secular Forum filed 17 first information reports (FIRs) against Edamaruku under IPC section 295-A, a blasphemy law of India.

Other Christian organizations in India disagreed with the Catholic Secular Forum's actions. The Roman Catholic Archdiocese of Bombay asked for the prosecution to drop the charges. The All India Catholic Union said the law was being applied incorrectly. Colin Gonsalves, the founder of the India Center for Human Rights and Law, stated that in his opinion no criminal offence had been committed.

As of 2014, the Catholic Secular Forum still held the position that they would call for Edamaruku's prosecution if he ever returned to India.

=== Misuse of donor funds ===
In 2014, Joseph Dias was charged by the Economic Offences Wing (EOW) of Mumbai police for misusing INR 2.2 crore of funds that were donated to build an old age home.
