= Offending religious feelings (Philippines) =

Philippine blasphemy law

In the Philippines, offending religious feelings is a blasphemy law-related offense under Article 133 of the Revised Penal Code, where it is called "offending the religious feelings" (emphasis added). It is a criminal offense which could only be committed if done in a place of worship or during a religious ceremony and if the act is considered "notoriously offensive to the feelings of the faithful".

== Provision ==
The offending religious feelings provision is stated in article 133 of the Revised Penal Code of 1930 which came into effect in 1932. There is a second religious offense under the same law which is interruption of religious worship stated in Article 132.

Offending the religious feelings. - The penalty of arresto mayor in its maximum period to prision correccional in its minimum period shall be imposed upon anyone who, in a place devoted to religious worship or during the celebration of any religious ceremony shall perform acts notoriously offensive to the feelings of the faithful.

— Art. 133, Revised Penal Code (1930)

As noted in the provision both conditions must be present in order to consider an act to be in violation of the "offending religious feelings" clause:

- The act should be committed in a place of worship or during a religious ceremony
- "notoriously offensive to the faithful"

Lawyer Chel Diokno names the following acts as "notoriously offensive" a mockery of dogma, a mockery of the religious ceremony, or toying with or destruction of an object of veneration.

Another similar provision in the same penal code is Article 201 which penalizes performances which offends "any race or religion"

== Cases ==
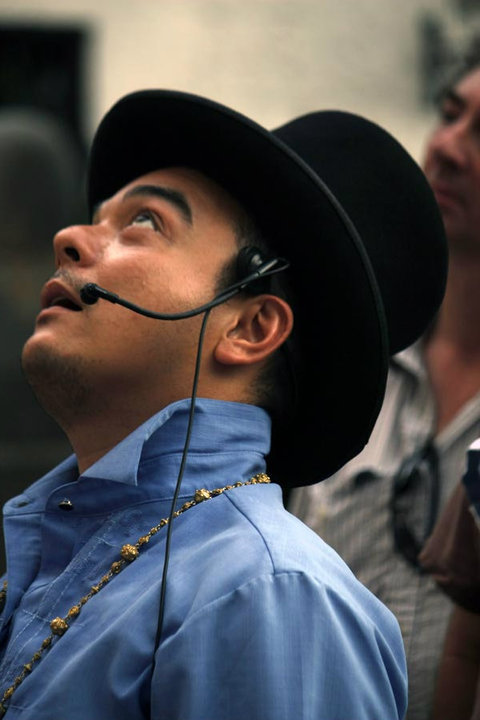
Carlos Celdran was convicted for "offending religious feelings" in 2019.

- Pre-World War II – A case involving a non-Catholic man buried with Catholic rites in a Catholic cemetery. The decision was authored by Justice Jose P. Laurel.
- Mandoriao (1953) – Mandoriao was convicted in a lower court for climbing up a stage in a religious rally organized by the Iglesia ni Cristo to engage with a debate with a minister. The man's conviction was overturned through an appeal, with the judge ruling that a religious rally held in a public plaza is not a religious ceremony.
- Anthony James and Nerissa Walker (2008) – British missionary Anthony James Walker and his Filipino wife were charged for "offending religious feelings" and disrupting a religious service over a commotion at a Christian service organized by the Bread of Life Ministries in Quezon City. Walker expressed his disagreement regarding doctrine with the presiding pastor.
- Carlos Celdran (2010) – for holding a sign with the text "Damaso", in reference to the antagonist priest of the same name in nationalist writer José Rizal's novel Noli Me Tángere at the Manila Cathedral during an ecumenical service in 2010. The stunt was in protest of the Catholic Church's alleged interference on the passage of the Reproductive Health Bill (now Responsible Parenthood Act of 2012). He was convicted in 2019.
- Winston Cabading (2022) – for statements allegedly against the Mary, Mediatrix of All Grace, a Marian apparition in Lipa, Batangas. Cabading is a Catholic priest and an exorcist who has insisted on the Vatican's stance that the apparition is non-miraculous. The case was filed by Mediatrix devotee Harriet Demetriou for his statements suggesting that the apparition is demonic in a conference and online show. (See Mediatrix of All Grace offending religious feelings case)
- Pura Luka Vega (2023) – for performing in drag dressed as Jesus Christ to the tune of a Tagalog rock remix version of the Lord's Prayer and again as the Black Nazarene while lip-syncing to a Taylor Swift song. They (Note: Luka does not identify with any gender label, but prefers the pronouns they/them.) were condemned by several personalities and Christian religious organizations and declared persona non grata by several local government units. (Note: Multiple sources:) Luka was arrested on October 4, 2023 and again on February 29, 2024 on several counts of violation of Article 133 ("acts notoriously offensive to the feelings of the faithful") and also of obscenity and immoral doctrines in violation of Article 201 of the Revised Penal Code in relation to the Cybercrime Prevention Act of 2012 filed against them by several sectarian groups.

== Attempts to repeal ==
There has been calls to repeal the offending religious feelings provision from the Revised Penal Code. It has been argued that it is unconstitutional contrary to the 1987 Constitution's non-establishment clause stating "no law shall be made respecting an establishment of religion, or prohibiting the free exercise thereof."

Carlos Celdran attempted to get the offending religious feelings provision ruled as unconstitutional in his own legal case.

During the 18th Congress, Senator Leila de Lima and House of Representatives member Edcel Lagman for Albay 1st District filed measures proposing the abolishment of the offending religious feelings from the Revised Penal Code. Lagman argued that the provision has been unconstitutional, as early as the 1935 iteration.

Christian Monsod, one of the framers of the 1987 Constitution called for the abolishment of the "offending religious feelings" provision believing it to be "too overbroad" and was a "throwback to the age of Church intolerance and oppression" which prevailed in the Spanish colonial era.

== See also ==
- Separation of church and state
- Freedom of religion in the Philippines
- Offending religious feelings (Poland) – similar provision in Poland
