= Harriet Demetriou =

Filipino lawyer

Chair of the Commission on Elections
- In office January 11, 1999 – January 21, 2001
- President: Joseph Estrada
- Preceded by: Luzviminda Tancangco
- Succeeded by: Alfredo Benipayo

Associate Justice of the Sandiganbayan
- In office August 28, 1995 – February 14, 1998
- President: Fidel V. Ramos
- Preceded by: Bienvenido Vera Cruz
- Succeeded by: Rodolfo Palattao

Harriet Obias Demetriou is a Filipino lawyer and retired judge. She served as the chairperson of the Commission on Elections (COMELEC) from 1999 to 2001, the first woman to serve in that post. Prior to that, she was an associate justice of the Sandiganbayan, serving from 1995 to 1998. As presiding judge of the Pasig regional trial court, she presided over the trial for the murders of Eileen Sarmenta and Allan Gomez, in which Calauan, Laguna mayor Antonio Sanchez and his accomplices were convicted in 1995.

== Career ==
=== Regional Trial Court judge ===
Demetriou, the then-judge of Pasig regional trial court, handed down the March 1995 verdict against former Calauan, Laguna mayor Antonio Sanchez and six others (then-PNP Calauan Deputy Chief George Medialdea, Luis Corcolon, Rogelio "Boy" Corcolon, Zoilo Ama, Baldwin Brion, and Pepito Kawit) for the rape-slay of 21-year-old Mary Eileen Sarmenta and the killing of 19-year-old Allan Gomez in June 1993.

=== Chair of the Commission on Elections ===
In 1998, Demetriou was appointed by President Joseph Estrada to be his chief presidential legal adviser. On January 11, 1999, President Estrada appointed her as Chair of the Commission on Elections. After the Second EDSA Revolution in January 2001 that led to Estrada's overthrow, Demetriou tendered her courtesy resignation which was accepted by succeeding president Gloria Macapagal Arroyo.

=== Later legal career ===
Demetriou was the lead counsel for the core officers of the Magdalo Group, who led the siege to the Oakwood hotel in Makati on July 27, 2003.

== Personal life ==
Demetriou is Roman Catholic, and is a devotee of the Our Lady, Mary, Mediatrix of All Grace. In 2022, she sued exorcist priest Winston Cabading for offending religious feelings over the priest's alleged mockery of the Marian image which is not recognized by the Holy See. On January 24, 2024, prosecutors dismissed the case for "insufficiency of evidence, since her complaint has no basis and there is no proof or document to support her claims."

On March 19, 2024, in a circular, Archbishop Gilbert Garcera of the Roman Catholic Archdiocese of Lipa stated that the Dicastery for the Doctrine of the Faith upon the request of Bishop Pablo Virgilio David, revealed the 1951 decree rejecting the Mediatrix apparition, “in which Sister Mother Mary Cecilia of Jesus, OCD, then the superior of the convent where the known events occurred, confessed guiltily to having deceived the faithful about the alleged apparitions in Lipa and consequently asked for forgiveness”. Demetriou continued to express skepticism over the letter.

== See also ==
- COMELEC

Legal offices
Preceded by Bienvenido Vera Cruz	Associate Justice of the Sandiganbayan; 1995–1998	Succeeded by Rodolfo Palattao
Preceded by Luzviminda Tancangco	COMELEC Chairman; 1999–2001	Succeeded by Alfredo Benipayo
