= Antonio Sanchez (murderer) =

Filipino convicted rapist-murderer and former politician

- Sanchez in c. 1993

Mayor of Calauan
- In office February 2, 1988 – August 13, 1993
- Succeeded by: Editha Sanchez
- In office June 30, 1980 – March 26, 1986 (Note: At this time, after the 1986 EDSA Revolution, President Corazon Aquino forced the resignation of all local government unit heads and appointed officers in charge in their place.)

Vice Mayor of Calauan
- In office January 1, 1972 – June 30, 1980

Personal details
- Born: Antonio Leyza Sanchez; May 10, 1946 Laguna, Philippines
- Died: March 27, 2021 (aged 74) New Bilibid Prison, Muntinlupa, Philippines
- Spouse: Editha Vito-Sanchez
- Domestic partner: Elvira Sanchez
- Children: 3
- Parent(s): Modesto del Valle Sanchez; Potenciana Leysa
- Occupation: Politician
- Criminal information
- Status: Died in prison
- Convictions: Rape with homicide (7 counts) (Eileen Sarmenta and Allan Gomez); Murder (2 counts) (Nelson and Rickson Peñalosa)
- Penalty: 9 counts of reclusion perpetua (40 years imprisonment); total 360 years imprisonment and ₱12.67 million in damages

Details
- Victims: 4
- Span of crimes: 1991–1993
- Locations: Calauan, Laguna, Philippines

Antonio Leyza Sanchez (May 10, 1946 – March 27, 2021) was a Filipino politician who served as mayor of Calauan, Laguna from 1980 to 1986 and from 1988 to 1993. He was convicted of seven counts of rape with homicide as the mastermind of the 1993 murders of Eileen Sarmenta and Allan Gomez, both students of the University of the Philippines Los Baños (UPLB). He was also convicted for the 1991 murders of Nelson and Rickson Peñalosa, a father and son pair who were supporters of his political rival.

== Political career ==
As mayor of Caluan from 1980 to 1981, Sanchez was entitled to a maximum salary of P17,724 a month, from 1981 to 1986, P26,388 a month, and from 1988, only P10,443 as Calauan was downgraded to a 5th class municipality, and yet his income was "grossly disproportionate" to his lifestyle.

Before Eileen Sarmenta was raped and killed and Allan Gomez was tortured and shot to death, Antonio Sanchez, then mayor of Calauan town in Laguna, was already being tried for two counts of murder.

On April 13, 1991, father and son Nelson and Rickson Peñalosa were shot to death by the mayor’s henchmen. Nelson was then a political leader and supporter of Sanchez’s political opponent.

== Crimes ==
On the night of June 28, 1993, Eileen Sarmenta and Allan Gomez, students of the University of the Philippines, Los Baños (UPLB), were abducted at gunpoint by men working for Antonio Sanchez, the mayor of Calauan, Laguna. The students were brought to Sanchez's farm in Barangay Curba, where both were bound and gagged. Court records showed Sanchez's men also brought Gomez along "to avoid complications". The students were brought inside a resthouse, where Sarmenta was taken into Sanchez's room while Gomez was beaten by Luis Corcolon, Rogelio "Boy" Corcolon, Zoilo Ama and George Medialdea and thereafter thrown out of the resthouse.

Pepito Kawit struck Allan Gomez's diaphragm with the butt of an Armalite, causing Gomez to fall against a cement box. Brion thought Gomez was already dead, but Kawit said that his death would come later. Aurelio Centeno joined Sanchez's personal aides Edwin Cosico and Raul Alorico to watch television at the adjacent resthouse. Alorico told Centeno that Sanchez had been eagerly waiting for the group and worried that they would not arrive.

At around 1:00 a.m. the next day, a crying Sarmenta was dragged out of the resthouse by Luis and Medialdea, still bound and gagged and now stripped of her shorts. Sanchez, clad merely in a white polo shirt, appeared and thanked Luis and Medialdea for the gift. He is alleged to have stated: "I am through with her. She's all yours." When asked what would happen to Gomez, Medialdea assured the mayor that they would also kill him for full measure. The students were then loaded in a Tamaraw van by the appellants and headed for Calauan, followed closely by the ambulance. Kawit finished off Gomez with a single gunshot from his Armalite.

The men then stopped at a sugarcane field at Sitio Paputok, Mabacan, Calauan, and gang-raped Sarmenta. Kawit invited Centeno to join the assault, but Centeno refused as he could not, in conscience, bear the crime being committed. Despite Sarmenta's pleas to spare her life, Luis Corcolon fired his baby Armalite at her, and ordered Centeno to get rid of her body.

Following separate investigations by different law enforcement agencies, prosecutors pursued charges against Sanchez and his men, but did not include Teofilo "Kit" Alqueza, son of Gen. Dictador Alqueza, as respondents. Sanchez had claimed Alqueza was the mastermind behind the incident.

=== Conviction ===
On March 14, 1995, Pasig Judge Harriet Demetriou concluded the 16-month Sarmenta-Gomez murder trial with the finding that Sanchez and several henchmen (only some of whom were policemen) were guilty of seven counts of rape with homicide for the rape and killing of Sarmenta and the killing of Sarmenta's friend. Demetriou, in her 132-page decision, described the crime as being borne out of "a plot seemingly hatched in hell". At the time of his conviction, the Philippines had the death penalty, which was briefly reinstated due to public anger over crime. Demetriou indicated that she would have sentenced both Sanchez and his bodyguard to deaths were it not for the fact that the murders were committed barely six months before the law went into effect on December 31, 1993.

Sanchez was serving seven counts of reclusión perpetua (40 years for each count) for the crimes until his death. On January 25, 1999, the Supreme Court of the Philippines affirmed the decision of the Regional Trial Court. On August 29, 1999, Sanchez was sentenced to two counts of reclusion perpetua by the Supreme Court for the 1991 murders of Nelson and Rickson Peñalosa.

=== Release order controversy ===
A report by GMA News showed that Sanchez could have walked free in August 2019, according to a document bearing the signature of Bureau of Corrections director Nicanor Faeldon.

The document said the release order was for one Antonio Leyza Sanchez, "who was found to have served 40 years upon retroactive application of RA No. 10592 and was certified to have no other legal cause to be further detained, shall be released from confinement." RA 10592 is the law allowing convicts an early release based on good conduct time allowance (GCTA).

Sanchez's kin had said that they were informed about Sanchez's impending release, but public outrage prompted the government to review the GCTA law.

== Personal life and death ==
Sanchez was the son of Juan Brion, a former mayor of Calauan. Antonio was married to Editha, who succeeded him as mayor of Calauan following his imprisonment. He had three children, one of whom, Ave Marie Tonee, became a municipal councilor of Calauan.

In his later years, Sanchez suffered from various health issues including a kidney problem, a cataract, gastroenteritis, chronic kidney disease, hypertension, and benign prostatic hypertrophy. He died at the New Bilibid Prison Hospital on March 27, 2021.

After an autopsy was conducted, Sanchez's remains were brought to his hometown in Calauan, Laguna on March 30, and he was later buried at Calauan Cemetery on April 7, 2021.

== Portrayal in popular culture ==
Sanchez' case was the inspiration for the 1993 film Humanda Ka Mayor!: Bahala Na Ang Diyos. The film, produced by Regal Entertainment and Golden Lions Productions, is based on Sanchez's account and criminal activities (with his name in the film changed to "Mayor Miguel Beltran" portrayed by Dick Israel).

The 2024 Metro Manila Film Festival entry Uninvited, starring Vilma Santos, was loosely inspired by the Sanchez case.
