= Revised Penal Code =

Criminal code of the Philippines

Philippine Legislature
- Long title: An Act Revising the Penal Code and other Penal Laws
- Citation: Act No. 3815
- Territorial extent: Philippines
- Enacted by: Governor-General of the Philippines with the advice and consent of the Philippine Legislature
- Enacted: December 8, 1930
- Signed: December 8, 1930
- Commenced: January 1, 1932

Amended by
- Presidential Decree No. 1602 (Gambling); Presidential Decree No. 1613 (Arson); Presidential Decree No. 1744 (Arson)

Keywords
- Criminal law
- Status: Amended

The Revised Penal Code contains the general penal laws of the Philippines. First enacted in 1930, it remains in effect today, despite several amendments thereto. It does not comprise a comprehensive compendium of all Philippine penal laws. The Revised Penal Code itself was enacted as Act No. 3815, and some Philippine criminal laws have been enacted outside of the Revised Penal Code as separate Republic Acts.

== Historical background ==
The Revised Penal Code supplanted the 1870 Spanish Código Penal, which was in force in the Philippines (then an overseas province of the Spanish Empire up to 1898) from 1886 to 1930, after an allegedly uneven implementation in 1877. The new Code was drafted by a committee created in 1927, and headed by Judge Anacleto Díaz, who would later serve on the Supreme Court. Rather than engage in a wholesale codification of all penal laws in the Philippines, the committee instead revised the old Penal Code and included all other penal laws only insofar as they related to the Penal Code.

== Features ==
The Revised Penal Code criminalizes a whole class of acts that are generally accepted as criminal, such as the taking of a life whether through murder or homicide, rape, robbery theft, and treason. The Code also penalizes other acts that are considered criminal in the Philippines, such as adultery, concubinage, and abortion. It expressly defines the elements that each crime comprises, and the existence of all these elements has to be proven beyond reasonable doubt in order to secure a conviction.

Not all crimes in the Philippines are penalized under the Code; certain crimes, such as the illegal possession of firearms, are penalized under special legislation contained in Republic Acts. The most notable crimes now excluded from the Revised Penal Code are those concerning illegal drug use or trafficking, which are penalized instead under the Dangerous Drugs Act of 1972 and later the Comprehensive Dangerous Drugs Act of 2002.

One distinct aspect of the Revised Penal Code centers on its classification of aggravating, exempting and mitigating circumstances, the appreciation of which affects the gradation of penalties. Penalties under the Revised Penal Code are generally divided into three periods – the minimum period, the medium period, and the maximum period. In addition to establishing the elements of the crime, the prosecution may also establish the presence of aggravating circumstances in order to set the penalty at the maximum period, or mitigating circumstances to reduce the penalty to its minimum period. The presence of both aggravating and mitigating circumstance, or the absence of such circumstances, may result in the imposition of the penalty in its medium period.

Several provisions of the Revised Penal Code have also been amended through Republic Acts. One of the more consequential amendments came in 1997, with the passage of Republic Act No. 8353, the Anti-Rape Law of 1997. Prior to the 1997 amendments, rape had been classified as a crime against chastity and was defined as "having carnal knowledge of a woman" under enumerated circumstances that indicated lack of consent. Under the amendments, rape was reclassified as a crime against persons. The definition was further expanded from mere "carnal knowledge of a woman" and now included "an act of sexual assault by inserting his penis into other person's mouth or anal orifice, or any instrument or object, into the genital or anal orifice of another person." Additional circumstances by which the victim would be deemed incapable of giving valid consent were also integrated into this new definition of rape.

With the abolition of the death penalty in 2006, the highest penalty currently possible under the Revised Penal Code is reclusión perpetua, which ranges from 20 years and 1 day to 40 years' imprisonment. The penalty of life imprisonment is not provided for in the Revised Penal Code, although it is imposed by other penal statutes such as the Comprehensive Dangerous Drugs Act.

Republic Act 10951, signed by president Rodrigo Duterte in 2017, updated the fines and penalties to the law. Previously, the law mandated fines ranging from five to 100,000 pesos; the new law updated the fines, ranging from 1,000 pesos for other coercions and unjust vexations, up to 4 million for treason. The law also amends the length of incarceration for malversation of public funds.

== Preliminary article ==
It states that the law shall be known as the "Revised Penal Code."

== Book One ==
A preliminary article states when it takes effect (on January 1, 1932), and where the law can be enforced, which includes the Philippine archipelago, and on a Philippine ship or airship, among others.

=== Title One: Felonies and criminal liability ===
Chapter One defines what a felony is, which are acts and omissions punishable by law, either by means of deceit, or by fault. It defines who is criminally liable, whether a felony is consummated, frustrated or attempted, when conspiracy and proposal to commit felonies are punishable, which felonies are light, less grave and grave.

The succeeding chapters list which circumstances justify, exempt, mitigate and aggravate criminal liability.

=== Title Two: Persons criminally liable ===
This title discusses who are the persons liable. These include the principals, accomplices and the accessories, with the latter classification not used for light felonies.

=== Title Three: Penalties ===
All penalties relating to death are commuted to reclusión perpetua.

==== Length of incarceration ====
Name	Type	Entire length	Minimum length	Medium length	Maximum length	Accessory penalties
Death	Capital	Not applied; commuted to reclusión perpetua.				Perpetual absolute disqualification and that of civil interdiction during thirty years following the date of sentence
Reclusión perpetua	Afflictive	20 years and 1 day to 40 years (Note: Amended from 30 years to 40 years by Republic Act No. 7659.)				Civil interdiction for life or during the period of the sentence as the case may be, and perpetual absolute disqualification
Reclusión temporal	Afflictive	12 years and one day to 20 years	12 years and one day to 14 years and 8 months	14 years and 8 months to 17 years and 4 months	17 years 4 months and 1 day to 20 years	Civil interdiction for life or during the period of the sentence as the case may be, and perpetual absolute disqualification
Prisión mayor	Afflictive	6 years and one day to 12 years	6 years and 1 day to 8 years	8 years and 1 day to 10 years	10 years and 1 day to 12 years	If disqualification is imposed, 12 years and 1 day; Temporary absolute disqualification and that of perpetual special disqualification from the right of suffrage
Prisión correccional	Correctional	6 months and one day to 6 years	6 months and 1 day to 2 years and 4 months	2 years, 4 months and 1 day to 4 years and 2 months	4 years, 2 months and 1 day to 6 years	Suspension from public office, from the right to follow a profession or calling, and that of perpetual special disqualification from the right of suffrage, if the duration of said imprisonment shall exceed eighteen months.
Suspension	Correctional	6 months and one day to 6 years	6 months and 1 day to 2 years and 4 months	2 years, 4 months and 1 day to 4 years and 2 months	4 years, 2 months and 1 day to 6 years	If suspension is imposed, 6 years
Destierro	Correctional	6 months and one day to 6 years	6 months and 1 day to 2 years and 4 months	2 years, 4 months and 1 day to 4 years and 2 months	4 years, 2 months and 1 day to 6 years	Any person sentenced to destierro shall not be permitted to enter the place or places designated in the sentence, nor within the radius therein specified, which shall be not more than 250 and not less than 25 kilometers from the place designated.
Arresto mayor	Correctional	1 month and 1 day to 6 months	1 month to 2 months	2 months and 1 day to 4 months	4 months and 1 day to 6 months	Suspension of the right to hold office and the right of suffrage during the term of the sentence
Arresto menor	Light	1 day to 30 days	1 day to 10 days	11 days to 20 days	21 days to 30 days	Suspension of the right to hold office and the right of suffrage during the term of the sentence

==== Other penalties ====
- Public censure (also a light penalty)
- Fines (also an afflictive penalty)
- Civil interdiction: Deprive the offender during the time of his sentence of the rights of parental authority, or guardianship

==== Accessory penalties ====
- Perpetual or temporary absolute disqualification
  - The deprivation of the public offices and employments which the offender may have held even if conferred by popular election.
  - The deprivation of the right to vote in any election for any popular elective office or to be elected to such office, and the disqualification for the offices or public employments and for the exercise of any of the rights mentioned.
  In case of temporary disqualification, this deprivation and disqualification shall last during the term of the sentence.
  - The loss of all rights to retirement pay or other pension for any office formerly held.
- Perpetual or temporary special disqualification:
  - The deprivation of the office, employment, profession or calling affected;
  - The disqualification for holding similar offices or employments either perpetually or during the term of the sentence according to the extent of such disqualification.
- Perpetual or temporary special disqualification for the exercise of the right of suffrage
  - Deprive the offender perpetually or during the term of the sentence, according to the nature of said penalty, of the right to vote in any popular election for any public office or to be elected to such office. Moreover, the offender shall not be permitted to hold any public office during the period of his disqualification.
- Suspension from any public office, profession or calling, or the right of suffrage
  - Disqualify the offender from holding such office or exercising such profession or calling or right of suffrage during the term of the sentence

==== Impossible crime ====
Article 59 has a provision for "impossible crimes". These are acts that satisfy the following:

- The person intending to commit an offense has already performed the acts
- The crime was not produced by reason of the fact that the act intended was by its nature one of impossible accomplishment, or
- The means employed by such person are essentially inadequate to produce the result desired by him

Example are stealing one's property, using a toy gun to kill someone, or adding a benign substance to poison someone.

The penalty is arresto mayor or a fine between 200 and 500 pesos.

=== Title Four: Extinction of criminal liability and civil liability ===
==== Extinction of criminal liability ====
This discusses when criminal liability is extinguished. These include by death of the convict, service of the sentence, by amnesty, and by absolute pardon, among others.

==== Prescription of crimes ====
This discusses when crimes can no longer be prosecuted, from the time the crime is discovered by the offended party, the authorities, or their agents.

Penalty	Length of time
Death, reclusión perpetua or reclusión temporal	20 years
Correctional penalty, except arresto mayor	10 years
Arresto mayor	5 years
Libel and other similar offenses	1 year
Oral defamation and slander	6 months
Light offenses	2 months

=== Title Five: Civil liability ===
The law states that "every person criminally liable for a felony is also civilly liable."

== Book Two ==
The code classifies crimes into different titles, each divided to one or more chapters, all of these in Book Two of the code.

=== Title One: Crimes against national security and the law of nations ===
- "Treason" is defined as "any person who, owing allegiance to (the United States or) the Government of the Philippine Islands, not being a foreigner, levies war against them or adheres to their enemies, giving them aid or comfort within the Philippine Islands or elsewhere"
- "Espionage" is defined as:
  1. Without authority therefor, enters a warship, fort, or naval or military establishment or reservation to obtain any information, plans, photographs, or other data of a confidential nature relative to the defense of the Philippine Archipelago; or
  2. Being in possession, by reason of the public office he holds, of the articles, data, or information referred to in the preceding paragraph, discloses their contents to a representative of a foreign nation.
- "Flight to enemy country", known elsewhere as "desertion", is defined as "any person who, owing allegiance to the Government, attempts to flee or go to an enemy country when prohibited by competent authority"
- "Piracy" is defined as "any person who, on the high seas, shall attack or seize a vessel or, not being a member of its complement nor a passenger, shall seize the whole or part of the cargo of said vessel, its equipment, or personal belongings of its complement or passengers."
  - "Qualified piracy" is defined as those who commit any of the crimes referred to in the preceding article, under any of the following circumstances:
    1. Whenever they have seized a vessel by boarding or firing upon the same;
    2. Whenever the pirates have abandoned their victims without means of saving themselves; or
    3. Whenever the crime is accompanied by murder, homicide, physical injuries or rape.

Art.	Crime	Aggravating, exempting and mitigating circumstances	Fine is not more than (unless specified)	Arresto menor			Arresto mayor			Prisión correccional			Prisión mayor			Reclusión temporal			Reclusión perpetua	Death
Art.	Crime	Aggravating, exempting and mitigating circumstances	Fine is not more than (unless specified)	Min	Med	Max	Min	Med	Max	Min	Med	Max	Min	Med	Max	Min	Med	Max	Reclusión perpetua	Death
114	Treason		₱4,000,000																Yes	
115	Conspiracy to commit treason		₱2,000,000										Yes							
115	Proposal to commit treason		₱1,000,000							Yes										
117	Espionage	If a public officer											Yes							
117	Espionage	All other cases								Yes										
118	Inciting to war or giving motives for reprisals	If a public officer														Yes				
118	Inciting to war or giving motives for reprisals	If a private individual											Yes							
119	Violation of neutrality									Yes										
120	Correspondence with hostile country	If prohibited by the government								Yes										
120	Correspondence with hostile country	If correspondence was carried on in ciphers or conventional signs											Yes							
120	Correspondence with hostile country	If information given might be useful to the enemy														Yes				
120	Correspondence with hostile country	If information given might be useful to the enemy, and offender intended to aid the enemy														Yes				
121	Flight to enemy country						Yes													
122	Piracy in general and mutiny on the high seas																		Yes	
123	Qualified piracy															Yes				

=== Title Two: Crimes against the fundamental laws of the state ===
- "Arbitrary detention" is defined as detention of a person by a public officer without legal grounds.
- "Expulsion", or "deportation" elsewhere, is defined as "any public officer or employee who, not being thereunto authorized by law, shall expel any person from the Philippine Islands or shall compel such person to change his residence."
- Violation of domicile, or "trespassing" elsewhere, is defined as "any public officer or employee who, not being authorized by judicial order, shall enter any dwelling against the will of the owner thereof, search papers or other effects found therein without the previous consent of such owner, or having surreptitiously entered said dwelling, and being required to leave the premises, shall refuse to do so
- "Offending the religious feelings" is defined as "anyone who, in a place devoted to religious worship or during the celebration of any religious ceremony shall perform acts notoriously offensive to the feelings of the faithful."

Art.	Crime	Aggravating, exempting and mitigating circumstances	Fine is not more than (unless specified)	Arresto menor			Arresto mayor			Prisión correccional			Prisión mayor			Reclusión temporal			Reclusión perpetua	Death
Art.	Crime	Aggravating, exempting and mitigating circumstances	Fine is not more than (unless specified)	Min	Med	Max	Min	Med	Max	Min	Med	Max	Min	Med	Max	Min	Med	Max	Reclusión perpetua	Death
124	Arbitrary detention	Detention has not exceeded three days							Yes											
124	Arbitrary detention	Detention is more than three days, but less than 15 days									Yes									
124	Arbitrary detention	Detention is more than 15 days, but less than six months											Yes							
124	Arbitrary detention	Detention has exceeded more than six months														Yes				
125	Delay in the delivery of detained persons to the proper judicial authorities.		Same as above penalties for arbitrary detention.																	
126	Delaying release		Same as above penalties for arbitrary detention.																	
127	Expulsion									Yes										
128	Violation of domicile	If committed at night-time, or if any papers or effects not constituting evidence of a crime be not returned immediately after the search made by the offender									Yes									
128	Violation of domicile	All other cases								Yes										
129	Search warrants maliciously obtained and abuse in the service of those legally obtained		₱200,000						Yes											
130	Searching domicile without witnesses							Yes												
131	Prohibition, interruption and dissolution of peaceful meetings									Yes										
132	Interruption of religious worship	If committed with violence or threats									Yes									
132	Interruption of religious worship	All other cases								Yes										
133	Offending the religious feelings								Yes											

=== Title Three: Crimes against public order ===
- Rebellion or insurrection is committed by rising publicly and taking arms against the Government for the purpose of removing from the allegiance to said Government or its laws, the territory of the Philippine Islands or any part thereof of any body of land, naval or other armed forces, or of depriving the Chief Executive or the Legislature, wholly or partially, of any of their powers or prerogatives
- Sedition is committed by persons who rise publicly and tumultuously in order to attain by force any of the following:
  - To prevent the promulgation or execution of any law or the holding of any popular election;
  - To prevent the Insular Government, or any provincial or municipal government or any public officer thereof from freely exercising its or his functions, or prevent the execution of any administrative order;
  - To inflict any act of hate or revenge upon the person or property of any public officer or employee;
  - To commit, for any political or social end, any act of hate or revenge against private persons or any social class; and
  - To despoil, for any political or social end, any person, municipality or province, or the Insular Government or the Government of the United States, of all its property or any part thereof.
- Acts tending to prevent the meeting of the Legislature and similar bodies occurs when any person who by force or fraud prevents the meeting of either of the Houses of the Legislature or of any provincial board or municipal council
- Violation of parliamentary immunity occurs when any person who shall use force, intimidation, threats, or fraud to prevent any member of either House of the Legislature from attending the meetings thereof, from expressing his opinions or casting his vote.
  - For public officers or employees, it also occurs while the Legislature is in session, knowingly arrest or search any member thereof, except in case such member has committed a crime punishable under this Code by a penalty higher than prision mayor.
- Illegal assemblies are any meeting attended by armed persons for the purpose of committing any of the crimes punishable under this Code, or of any meeting in which the audience is incited to the commission of the crime of treason, rebellion or insurrection, sedition, or assault upon a person in authority or his agents.
- Illegal associations are associations totally or partially organized for the purpose of committing any of the crimes punishable under this Code or for some purpose contrary to public morals.
- Direct assaults are, without a public uprising, shall employ force or intimidation for the attainment of any of the purposes enumerated in defining the crimes of rebellion and sedition, or shall attack, employ force or seriously intimidate or resist any person in authority or any of his agents, while engaged in the performance of official duties, or on occasion of such performance.
- Indirect assaults are defined as "any person who shall make use of force or intimidation upon any person coming to the aid of the authorities or their agents on occasion of the commission" of direct assault.
- Disobedience to summons is defined as any person who, having been duly summoned to attend as a witness before either House of the Legislature, or before any committee thereof, refuses, without legal excuse, to obey such summons, or being present before any such body or committee refuses to be sworn or placed under affirmation or to answer any legal inquiry or to produce any books, papers, documents, or records in his possession, when required by them to do so in the exercise of their functions.
- Resistance and disobedience to a person in authority occurs when "any person... resist or seriously disobey any person in authority, or the agents of such person, while engaged in the performance of official duties".
- Tumults and other disturbances of public order occurs when "any person who shall cause any serious disturbance in a public place, office, or establishments, or shall interrupt or disturb public performances, functions or gatherings, or peaceful meetings"
- Unlawful use of means of publication occurs when:
  - Any person who by means of printing, lithography, or any other means of publication, shall maliciously publish as news any false news which may endanger the public order or cause damage to the interest or credit of the State;
  - Any person who by the same means, shall encourage disobedience to the law or to the constituted authorities or praise, justify or extol any act punished by law;
  - Any person who shall maliciously publish any official resolution or document without proper authority, or before they have been published officially; or
  - Any person who shall print or publish books, pamphlets, periodicals, or leaflets which do not bear the real printer's name.
- Alarms and scandals occur when:
  - Any person who within any town or public place, shall discharge any firearm, rocket, firecracker, or other explosive calculated to cause alarm or danger;
  - Any person who shall instigate or take an active part in any charivari or other disorderly meeting offensive to another or prejudicial to public tranquility;
  - Any person who, while wandering about at night or while engaged in any other nocturnal amusements, shall disturb the public peace; or
  - Any person who while intoxicated or otherwise, shall cause any disturbance or scandal in public places, provided that the circumstances of the case shall not make the provisions of article 153 applicable.
- Delivering prisoners from jails occurs when a "person who shall remove from any jail or penal establishment any person confined therein or shall help the escape of such person."
- Evasion of service of sentence occurs when "any convict who shall evade service of his sentence by escaping during the term of his imprisonment by reason of final judgment"

Art.	Crime	Aggravating, exempting and mitigating circumstances	Fine is not more than (unless specified)	Arresto menor			Arresto mayor			Prisión correccional			Prisión mayor			Reclusión temporal			Reclusión perpetua	Death
Art.	Crime	Aggravating, exempting and mitigating circumstances	Fine is not more than (unless specified)	Min	Med	Max	Min	Med	Max	Min	Med	Max	Min	Med	Max	Min	Med	Max	Reclusión perpetua	Death
134–135	Rebellion or insurrection	Offender promotes, maintains, or heads	₱20,000										Yes							
134–135	Rebellion or insurrection	Offender merely participating or executing the commands of others											Yes							
134-A	Coup d'etat	Offender leads or in any manner directs or commands others																	Yes	
134-A	Coup d'etat	If a public officer participates, or executes directions or commands of others														Yes				
134-A	Coup d'etat	If not a public officer, and participates, or executes directions or commands of others													Yes					
136	Conspiracy and proposal to commit coup d'etat		₱1,000,000												Yes					
136	Conspiracy and proposal to commit rebellion		₱1,000,000									Yes								
136	Conspiracy and proposal to commit insurrection		₱400,000								Yes									
137	Disloyalty of public officers or employees									Yes										
138	Inciting a rebellion or insurrection												Yes							
139–140	Sedition	If leader	₱2,000,000										Yes							
139–140	Sedition	Other participants	₱1,000,000									Yes								
141	Conspiracy to commit sedition		₱400,000								Yes									
142	Inciting to sedition		₱400,000									Yes								
143	Act tending to prevent the meeting of the Assembly and similar bodies		₱40,000 to ₱400,000							Yes										
144	Disturbance of proceedings		₱200,000				Yes													
145	Violation of parliamentary immunity												Yes							
146	Illegal assemblies	If leader										Yes								
146	Illegal assemblies	If present					Yes													
146	Illegal assemblies	If present, and armed								Yes										
147	Illegal associations	If founders, directors, and presidents	₱200,000							Yes										
147	Illegal associations	If members					Yes													
148	Direct assaults	If assault is committed with a weapon, or against a person of authority	₱200,000								Yes									
148	Direct assaults	All other cases	₱100,000							Yes										
149	Indirect assaults		₱100,000							Yes										
150	Disobedience to summons		₱40,000 to ₱200,000				Yes													
151	Resistance and disobedience to a person in authority	Resist or seriously disobey	₱100,000				Yes													
151	Resistance and disobedience to a person in authority	Not of a serious nature	₱2,000 to ₱20,000	Yes																
153	Tumultuous disturbance or interruption liable to cause disturbance	If serious disturbance	₱200,000					Yes												
153	Tumultuous disturbance or interruption liable to cause disturbance	If serious disturbance is of tumultuous character									Yes									
153	Tumultuous disturbance or interruption liable to cause disturbance	If offender make any outcry tending to incite rebellion or sedition or in such place shall display placards or emblems					Yes													
153	Tumultuous disturbance or interruption liable to cause disturbance	If offender buries with pomp the body of a person who has been legally executed	₱40,000	Yes																
154	Unlawful use of means of publication and unlawful utterances		₱40,000 to ₱200,000				Yes													
155	Alarms and scandals		₱40,000	Yes																
156	Delivery of prisoners from jails	If offender removes from any jail or penal establishment any person confined therein or shall help the escape of such person, by means of violence, intimidation, or bribery							Yes											
156	Delivery of prisoners from jails	If by other means					Yes													
157	Evasion of service of sentence	If convict escaped									Yes									
157	Evasion of service of sentence	If convict escaped via unlawful entry										Yes								
157	Evasion of service of sentence	If convict violated conditions of pardon								Yes										

=== Title Four: Crimes against public interest ===
Art.	Crime	Aggravating, exempting and mitigating circumstances	Fine is not more than (unless specified)	Arresto menor			Arresto mayor			Prisión correccional			Prisión mayor			Reclusión temporal			Reclusión perpetua	Death
Art.	Crime	Aggravating, exempting and mitigating circumstances	Fine is not more than (unless specified)	Min	Med	Max	Min	Med	Max	Min	Med	Max	Min	Med	Max	Min	Med	Max	Reclusión perpetua	Death
161	Counterfeiting the great seal of the Government of the Philippine Islands, forging the signature or stamp of the Chief Executive															Yes				
162	Using forged signature or counterfeit seal or stamp												Yes							
163	Making and importing and uttering false coins	If coinage of the Philippines	₱400,000										Yes							
163	Making and importing and uttering false coins	If counterfeit is from a foreign country	₱200,000							Yes										
164–165	Mutilation of coins	With connivance	₱400,000							Yes										
164–165	Mutilation of coins	Without connivance					Yes													
166	Forging treasury or bank notes on other documents payable to bearer; importing, and uttering such false or forged notes and documents	if the document is an obligation or security of the Philippines	₱2,000,000													Yes				
166	Forging treasury or bank notes on other documents payable to bearer; importing, and uttering such false or forged notes and documents	if the document is an obligation or security of a banking institution	₱1,000,000												Yes					
166	Forging treasury or bank notes on other documents payable to bearer; importing, and uttering such false or forged notes and documents	if the document is an obligation or security of a foreign government	₱1,000,000											Yes						
166	Forging treasury or bank notes on other documents payable to bearer; importing, and uttering such false or forged notes and documents	if the document is an obligation or security of a foreign bank	₱400,000										Yes							
167	Counterfeiting, importing and uttering instruments not payable to bearer		₱1,200,000								Yes									
170	Falsification of legislative documents		₱1,200,000									Yes								
171	Falsification by public officer, employee or notary or ecclesiastic minister		₱1,000,000										Yes							
172	Falsification by private individual and use of falsified documents		₱1,000,000							Yes										
173	Falsification of wireless, cable, telegraph and telephone messages	Creation of dispatch									Yes									
173	Falsification of wireless, cable, telegraph and telephone messages	Usage of dispatch							Yes											
174	False medical certificates, false certificates of merits or service, etc.	If physician or surgeon, or if a public officer	₱200,000						Yes											
174	False medical certificates, false certificates of merits or service, etc.	If a private individual					Yes													
175	False medical certificates, false certificates of merits or service, etc.	Usage of certificates		Yes																
176	Manufacturing and possession of instruments or implements for falsification	Making or introduction	₱1,000,000								Yes									
176	Manufacturing and possession of instruments or implements for falsification	Usage							Yes											
178	Using fictitious name and concealing true name.	If offender publicly use a fictitious name for the purpose of concealing a crime, evading the execution of a judgment or causing damage	₱100,000				Yes													
178	Using fictitious name and concealing true name.	If offender conceals his true name and other personal circumstances	₱40,000	Yes																
179	Illegal use of uniforms or insignia						Yes													
180	False testimony against a defendant	If the defendant was sentenced to death														Yes				
180	False testimony against a defendant	if the defendant shall have been sentenced to reclusión temporal or reclusión perpetua											Yes							
180	False testimony against a defendant	If the defendant shall have been sentenced to any other afflictive penalty	₱200,000							Yes										
180	False testimony against a defendant	If the defendant shall have been sentenced to a correctional penalty or a fine, or shall have been acquitted	₱200,000				Yes													
181	False testimony favorable to the defendants	If the prosecution is for a felony punishable by an afflictive penalty	₱200,000						Yes											
181	False testimony favorable to the defendants	Any other case					Yes													
182	False testimony in civil cases	If amount is more than one million pesos	₱1,000,000							Yes										
182	False testimony in civil cases	If amount is less than one million pesos or cannot be estimated	₱200,000					Yes												
183	False testimony in other cases and perjury in solemn affirmation								Yes											
184	Offering false testimony in evidence		Depends on the penalties for any of the false testimony crimes.																	
185	Machinations in public auctions									Yes										
186	Monopolies and combinations in restraint of trade	If affects any food substance, motor fuel or lubricants, or other articles of prime necessity												Yes						
186	Monopolies and combinations in restraint of trade	If other products or service								Yes										
187	Importation and disposition of falsely marked articles or merchandise made of metals		₱40,000							Yes										
188	Subsisting and altering trade-mark, trade-names, or service marks		₱50 to ₱2,000							Yes										
189	Unfair competition, fraudulent registration of trade-mark, trade-name or service mark, fraudulent designation of origin, and false description		₱50 to ₱2,000							Yes										

=== Title Five: Crimes relative to opium and other prohibited drugs ===
Articles 190 to 194 were repealed by Comprehensive Dangerous Drugs Act of 2002.

=== Title Six: Crimes against public morals ===
Articles 195 to 199, which cover gambling, have been repealed by Presidential Decree 1602 as amended by Republic Act 9287.

Art.	Crime	Aggravating, exempting and mitigating circumstances	Fine is not more than (unless specified)	Arresto menor			Arresto mayor			Prisión correccional			Prisión mayor			Reclusión temporal			Reclusión perpetua	Death
Art.	Crime	Aggravating, exempting and mitigating circumstances	Fine is not more than (unless specified)	Min	Med	Max	Min	Med	Max	Min	Med	Max	Min	Med	Max	Min	Med	Max	Reclusión perpetua	Death
200	Grave scandal (Note: The penalty also includes public censure.)						Yes													
201	Immoral doctrines, obscene publications and exhibitions and indecent shows		₱20,000										Yes							
202	Prostitution	If recidivist	₱20,000 to ₱200,000					Yes												
202	Prostitution	All other cases	₱20,000	Yes																

=== Title Seven: Crimes committed by public officers ===
For purposes of this section, and elsewhere when cited, a public officer is a anyone who takes part in public functions of the government of the Philippines.

Other crimes committed by public officers are included in the Anti-Graft and Corrupt Practices Act, and other laws.

Crime	Aggravating, exempting and mitigating circumstances	Fine is not more than (unless specified)	Suspension or disqualification	Arresto menor			Arresto mayor			Prisión correccional			Prisión mayor			Reclusión temporal			Reclusión perpetua	Death
Crime	Aggravating, exempting and mitigating circumstances	Fine is not more than (unless specified)	Suspension or disqualification	Min	Med	Max	Min	Med	Max	Min	Med	Max	Min	Med	Max	Min	Med	Max	Reclusión perpetua	Death
Knowingly rendering unjust judgment			Perpetual absolute disqualification										Yes							
Judgment rendered through negligence			Temporary special disqualification				Yes													
Unjust interlocutory order	All other cases		Suspension				Yes													
Unjust interlocutory order	If offender have acted by reason of inexcusable negligence or ignorance, and order was manifestly unjust		Suspension																	
Malicious delay in the administration of justice										Yes										
Prosecution of offenses; negligence and tolerance			Suspension							Yes										
Betrayal of trust by an attorney or solicitor, or revelation of secrets		₱40,000								Yes										
Direct bribery	Agrees to perform the crime in connection with his duties, in consideration with an offer	Not less than the value of the gift and not more than three times such value	Special temporary disqualification							Yes										
Direct bribery	If the gift was accepted by the officer in consideration of the execution of an act which does not constitute a crime, and the officer executed said act	Not less than the value of the gift and not more than twice such value	Special temporary disqualification							Yes										
Direct bribery	If the gift was accepted by the officer in consideration of the execution of an act which does not constitute a crime, and the officer did not execute said act	Not less than the value of the gift and not more than twice such value	Special temporary disqualification						Yes											
Direct bribery	If the object for which the gift was received or promised was to make the public officer refrain from doing something which it was his official duty to do	Not less than the value of the gift and not more than three times such value	Special temporary disqualification					Yes												
Indirect bribery							Yes													
Frauds against the public treasury and similar offenses		₱40,000 to ₱2,000,000									Yes									
Other frauds			Temporary special disqualification in its maximum period to perpetual special disqualification																	
Prohibited transactions		₱40,000 to ₱2,000,000										Yes								
Possession of prohibited interest by a public officer		₱40,000 to ₱200,000						Yes												
Malversation of public funds or property	If value is less than 40,000 pesos	Equal to the amount of the funds misused or equal to the total value of the property embezzled	Perpetual special disqualification								Yes									
Malversation of public funds or property	If value is more than 40,000 pesos and less than 1,200,000 pesos	Equal to the amount of the funds misused or equal to the total value of the property embezzled	Perpetual special disqualification										Yes							
Malversation of public funds or property	If value is more than 1,200,000 pesos and less than 2,400,000 pesos	Equal to the amount of the funds misused or equal to the total value of the property embezzled	Perpetual special disqualification												Yes					
Malversation of public funds or property	If value is more than 2,400,000 pesos and less than 4,400,000 pesos	Equal to the amount of the funds misused or equal to the total value of the property embezzled	Perpetual special disqualification														Yes			
Malversation of public funds or property	If value is more than 4,400,000 pesos and less than 8,800,000 pesos	Equal to the amount of the funds misused or equal to the total value of the property embezzled	Perpetual special disqualification															Yes		
Malversation of public funds or property	If value is more than 8,800,000 pesos	Equal to the amount of the funds misused or equal to the total value of the property embezzled	Perpetual special disqualification																Yes	
Failure of accountable officer to render accounts		₱40,000 to ₱1,200,000					Yes													
Failure of a responsible public officer to render accounts before leaving the country		₱40,000 to ₱200,000	Temporary special disqualification				Yes													
Failure to make delivery of public funds or property		5% to 25% of the sum that was not delivered					Yes													
Conniving with or consenting to evasion of prisoners	If the fugitive shall have been sentenced by final judgment to any penalty		Temporary special disqualification in its maximum period to perpetual special disqualification								Yes									
Conniving with or consenting to evasion of prisoners	If the fugitive shall not have been finally convicted but only held as a detention prisoner		Temporary special disqualification							Yes										
Evasion of prisoners through negligence			Temporary special disqualification						Yes											
Escape of prisoner under the custody of a person not a public officer		Same as the evasion of prisoners for public officers, only that it is one degree lower.																		
Removal, concealment or destruction of documents	When serious damage is caused	₱200,000	Temporary special disqualification in its maximum period to perpetual disqualification										Yes							
Removal, concealment or destruction of documents	When damage is not serious	₱200,000	Temporary special disqualification in its maximum period to perpetual disqualification							Yes										
Officer breaking seal		₱400,000	Temporary special disqualification							Yes										
Opening of closed documents		₱400,000	Temporary special disqualification				Yes													
Revelation of secrets by an officer	When serious damage is caused	₱400,000	Perpetual special disqualification								Yes									
Revelation of secrets by an officer	When damage is not serious	₱100,000	Temporary special disqualification							Yes										
Public officer revealing secrets of private individual		₱200,000					Yes													
Open disobedience to a judgment		₱200,000	Temporary special disqualification in its maximum period					Yes												
Disobedience to order of superior officers, when said order was suspended by inferior officer			Perpetual special disqualification							Yes										
Refusal of assistance of a public officer	When serious damage is caused	₱200,000	Perpetual special disqualification					Yes												
Refusal of assistance of a public officer	When damage is not serious	₱100,000						Yes												
Refusal to discharge elective office		₱200,000					Yes													
Maltreatment of prisoners	If the purpose of the maltreatment is to extort a confession, or to obtain some information from the prisoner	₱100,000	Temporary special disqualification										Yes							
Maltreatment of prisoners	All other cases										Yes									
Anticipation of duties of a public office		₱100,000	Suspension																	
Prolonging performance of duties and powers of a public officer		₱100,000	Special temporary disqualification in its minimum period							Yes										
Abandonment of office or position of a public officer	If abandoned top evade discharge of the duties preventing, prosecuting or punishing any of the crime									Yes										
Abandonment of office or position of a public officer	All other cases						Yes													
Usurpation of legislative powers		₱200,000								Yes										
Usurpation of executive functions								Yes												
Usurpation of judicial functions								Yes												
Disobeying request for disqualification		₱100,000					Yes													
Orders or requests by executive officers to any judicial authority		₱100,000					Yes													
Unlawful appointments		₱200,000					Yes													
Abuses against chastity by public officers	If against the wife, daughter, sister of relative within the same degree by affinity of any person in the custody of such warden or officer,		Temporary special disqualification							Yes										
Abuses against chastity by public officers	All other cases										Yes									

=== Title Eight: Crimes against persons ===
Crime	Aggravating, exempting and mitigating circumstances	Fine is not more than (unless specified)	Arresto menor			Arresto mayor			Prisión correccional			Prisión mayor			Reclusión temporal			Reclusión perpetua	Death
Crime	Aggravating, exempting and mitigating circumstances	Fine is not more than (unless specified)	Min	Med	Max	Min	Med	Max	Min	Med	Max	Min	Med	Max	Min	Med	Max	Reclusión perpetua	Death
Parricide																		Yes	
Murder															Yes				
Homicide															Yes				
Frustrated parricide, murder or homicide		Same as respective punishments, only that it is one degree lower.																	
Death caused in a tumultuous affray	If it cannot be ascertained who actually killed the deceased, but the person or persons who inflicted serious physical injuries can be identified											Yes							
Death caused in a tumultuous affray	If it cannot be determined who inflicted the serious physical injuries								Yes										
Physical injuries inflicted in a tumultuous affray	If serious physical injuries are inflicted upon the participants thereof and the person responsible thereof cannot be identified	Same as respective punishments, only that it is one degree lower.																	
Physical injuries inflicted in a tumultuous affray	When the physical injuries inflicted are of a less serious nature and the person responsible therefore cannot be identified					Yes													
Giving assistance to suicide	If person successfully kills oneself														Yes				
Giving assistance to suicide	If a person merely assisted											Yes							
Giving assistance to suicide	If person failed in killing oneself						Yes												
Discharge of firearms	Unless it is an attempted or frustrated parricide, murder or homicide								Yes										
Infanticide	If committed by mother of the child for the purpose of concealing her dishonor									Yes									
Infanticide	If committed by maternal grandparents											Yes							
Infanticide	All other cases	Same as parricide or murder																	
Abortion	If violence upon the person of the pregnant woman was done														Yes				
Abortion	If without violence upon and without the consent of the woman											Yes							
Abortion	If the woman consented									Yes									
Unintentional abortion	If violence was done								Yes										
Abortion practiced by the woman herself of by her parents	If practiced upon herself or consent to another person									Yes									
Abortion practiced by the woman herself of by her parents	If practiced upon herself to conceal dishonor								Yes										
Abortion practiced by the woman herself of by her parents	If practiced by her parents for concealing her dishonor									Yes									
Abortion practiced by a physician or midwife and dispensing of abortives	If violence upon the person of the pregnant woman was done																Yes		
Abortion practiced by a physician or midwife and dispensing of abortives	If without violence upon and without the consent of the woman													Yes					
Abortion practiced by a physician or midwife and dispensing of abortives	If the woman consented										Yes								
Abortion practiced by a physician or midwife and dispensing of abortives	If pharmacist who, without the proper prescription from a physician shall dispense any abortive	₱100,000			Yes														
Dueling	If adversary was killed														Yes				
Dueling	If no physical injuries inflicted					Yes													
Challenging to a duel									Yes										
Mutilation	If victim was deprived either totally or partially, or some essential organ of reproduction.														Yes				
Mutilation	All other cases						Yes												
Serious physical injuries	If the injured person shall become insane, imbecile, impotent, or blind											Yes							
Serious physical injuries	If person injured shall have lost the use of speech or the power to hear or to smell, or shall have lost an eye, a hand, a foot, an arm, or a leg or shall have lost the use of any such member, or shall have become incapacitated for the work									Yes									
Serious physical injuries	If the person injured shall have become deformed, or shall have lost any other part of his body, or shall have lost the use thereof, or shall have been ill or incapacitated for the performance of the work								Yes										
Serious physical injuries	If the physical injuries inflicted shall have caused the illness or incapacity for labor of the injured person for more than thirty days						Yes												
Administering injurious substances or beverages		Same as serious physical injuries.																	
Less serious physical injuries	If the physical injuries inflicted shall have caused the illness or incapacity for labor of the injured person for 10 days or more					Yes													
Less serious physical injuries	If manifest intent to insult or offend the injured person, or under circumstances adding ignominy to the offense	₱50,000				Yes													
Less serious physical injuries	Inflicted upon the offender's parents, ascendants, guardians, curators, teachers, or persons of rank, or persons in authority								Yes										
Slight physical injuries and maltreatment	If the offender has inflicted physical injuries which shall incapacitate the offended party for labor from one to nine days, or shall require medical attendance		Yes																
Slight physical injuries and maltreatment	If it caused physical injuries which do not prevent the offended party from engaging in his habitual work nor require medical assistance	₱40,000	Yes, or fine.																
Slight physical injuries and maltreatment	If the offender shall ill-treat another by deed without causing any injury		Yes, or fine																
Rape, when offender has carnal knowledge of a woman	All other cases																	Yes	
Rape, when offender has carnal knowledge of a woman	If done with a deadly weapon																	Yes	
Rape, when offender has carnal knowledge of a woman	If victim became insane																	Yes	
Rape, when offender has carnal knowledge of a woman	If rape is attempted and homicide is committed																	Yes	
Rape, when offender has carnal knowledge of a woman	If rape and homicide is committed																		Yes
Rape, when offender has carnal knowledge of a woman	When the victim is under eighteen (18) years of age and the offender is a parent, ascendant, step-parent, guardian, relative by consanguinity or affinity within the third civil degree, or the common-law spouse of the parent of the victim																		Yes
Rape, when offender has carnal knowledge of a woman	When the victim is under the custody of the police or military authorities or any law enforcement or penal institution																		Yes
Rape, when offender has carnal knowledge of a woman	When the rape is committed in full view of the spouse, parent, any of the children or other relatives within the third civil degree of consanguinity																		Yes
Rape, when offender has carnal knowledge of a woman	When the victim is a religious engaged in legitimate religious vocation or calling and is personally known to be such by the offender																		Yes
Rape, when offender has carnal knowledge of a woman	When the victim is a child below seven years old																		Yes
Rape, when offender has carnal knowledge of a woman	When the offender knows that he is afflicted with the Human Immuno-Deficiency Virus/Acquired Immune Deficiency Syndrome or any other sexually transmissible disease and the virus or disease is transmitted to the victim																		Yes
Rape, when offender has carnal knowledge of a woman	When committed by any member of the Armed Forces of the Philippines or para-military units thereof or the Philippine National Police or any law enforcement agency or penal institution, when the offender took advantage of his position to facilitate the commission of the crime																		Yes
Rape, when offender has carnal knowledge of a woman	When by reason or on the occasion of the rape, the victim has suffered permanent physical mutilation or disability																		Yes
Rape, when offender has carnal knowledge of a woman	When the offender knew of the pregnancy of the offended party at the time of the commission of the crime																		Yes
Rape, when offender has carnal knowledge of a woman	When the offender knew of the mental disability, emotional disorder and/or physical handicap of the offended party																		Yes
Rape, if inserting his penis into another person's mouth or anal orifice, or any instrument or object, into the genital or anal orifice of another person	Whenever the rape is committed with the use of a deadly weapon or by two or more persons											Yes							
Rape, if inserting his penis into another person's mouth or anal orifice, or any instrument or object, into the genital or anal orifice of another person	When by reason or on the occasion of the rape, the victim has become insane														Yes				
Rape, if inserting his penis into another person's mouth or anal orifice, or any instrument or object, into the genital or anal orifice of another person	If rape is attempted and homicide is committed														Yes				
Rape, if inserting his penis into another person's mouth or anal orifice, or any instrument or object, into the genital or anal orifice of another person	If rape and homicide is committed																	Yes	
Acts of lasciviousness									Yes										

=== Title Nine: Crimes against personal liberty and security ===
Crime	Aggravating, exempting and mitigating circumstances	Fine is not more than (unless specified)	Arresto menor			Arresto mayor			Prisión correccional			Prisión mayor			Reclusión temporal			Reclusión perpetua	Death
Crime	Aggravating, exempting and mitigating circumstances	Fine is not more than (unless specified)	Min	Med	Max	Min	Med	Max	Min	Med	Max	Min	Med	Max	Min	Med	Max	Reclusión perpetua	Death
Kidnapping and serious illegal detention	If committed for the purpose of extorting ransom																		Yes
Kidnapping and serious illegal detention	All other cases																	Yes	
Slight illegal detention	If offender released victim within three days of detention, did not attain purpose, and before proceedings against him	₱100,000										Yes							
Slight illegal detention	All other cases														Yes				
Unlawful arrest		₱100,000			Yes														
Kidnapping and failure to return a minor																			
Inducing a minor to abandon his home	If offender is parent of the minor	₱40,000				Yes													
Inducing a minor to abandon his home	All other cases	₱100,000							Yes										
Slavery	If purpose is for illegal trafficking													Yes					
Slavery	All other cases											Yes							
Child labor									Yes										
Services rendered under compulsion in payment of debt								Yes											
Abandonment of person in danger and abandonment of one's own victim						Yes													
Abandoning a minor	If minor died	₱100,000								Yes									
Abandoning a minor	If minor was merely in danger	₱100,000						Yes											
Abandoning a minor	All other cases	₱100,000				Yes													
Abandonment of minor by person entrusted with his custody		₱100,000				Yes													
Exploitation of minors		₱100,000							Yes										
Qualified trespass to dwelling	If committed by violence or intimidation	₱200,000								Yes									
Qualified trespass to dwelling	All other cases	₱200,000				Yes													
Other forms of trespass		₱40,000	Yes																
Light threats						Yes													
Other light threats		₱40,000	Yes																
Grave coercions		₱100,000							Yes										
Light coercions		₱15,000				Yes													
Other coercions or unjust vexations		₱1,000 to ₱40,000	Yes																
Compulsory purchase of merchandise and payment of wages by means of tokens		₱40,000 to ₱100,000				Yes													
Formation, maintenance and prohibition of combination of capital or labor through violence or threats		₱60,000				Yes													
Discovering secrets through seizure of correspondence	If secrets were revealed	₱100,000							Yes										
Discovering secrets through seizure of correspondence	If secrets were not revealed	₱100,000				Yes													
Revealing secrets with abuse of office	If secrets were revealed	₱100,000				Yes													
Revelation of industrial secrets		₱100,000							Yes										

=== Title Ten: Crimes against property ===
Crime	Aggravating, exempting and mitigating circumstances	Fine is not more than (unless specified)	Arresto menor			Arresto mayor			Prisión correccional			Prisión mayor			Reclusión temporal			Reclusión perpetua	Death
Crime	Aggravating, exempting and mitigating circumstances	Fine is not more than (unless specified)	Min	Med	Max	Min	Med	Max	Min	Med	Max	Min	Med	Max	Min	Med	Max	Reclusión perpetua	Death
Robbery with violence against or intimidation of persons	If the crime of homicide shall have been committed; or when the robbery shall have been accompanied by rape or intentional mutilation or arson																	Yes	
Robbery with violence against or intimidation of persons	If serious physical injuries have been inflicted															Yes			
Robbery with violence against or intimidation of persons	If physical injuries have been inflicted														Yes				
Robbery with violence against or intimidation of persons	If light physical injuries have been inflicted													Yes					
Robbery with violence against or intimidation of persons	All other cases										Yes								
Attempted and frustrated robbery																	Yes		
Brigandage	If not acts cannot be punished by higher penalties											Yes							
Brigandage	If acts can be punished by higher penalties	The higher penalties will then be followed.																	
Aiding and abetting a band of brigands												Yes							
Theft	If value is more than 2,200,000 pesos													Yes					
Theft	If value is more than 1,200,000 pesos but less than 2,200,000 pesos											Yes							
Theft	If value is more than 20,000 pesos but less than 600,000 pesos									Yes									
Theft	If value is more than 5,000 pesos but less than 20,000 pesos								Yes										
Theft	If value is more than 500 pesos but less than 5,000 pesos							Yes											
Theft	If value is less than 500 pesos					Yes													
Theft	If value is less than 500 pesos, and enter an enclosed estate or a field where trespass is forbidden or which belongs to another and without the consent of its owner		Yes																
Theft	If value is less than 500 pesos, and if offender under the impulse of hunger, poverty, etc.		Yes																
Theft of the property of the National Library and National Museum		₱40,000 to ₱100,000				Yes													
Occupation of real property or usurpation of real rights in property		₱15,000																	
Altering boundaries or landmarks		₱20,000	Yes																
Fraudulent insolvency	If a merchant											Yes							
Fraudulent insolvency	If not a merchant										Yes								
Swindling (estafa)	If value is more than 4,400,000 pesos													Yes					
Swindling (estafa)	If value is more than 2,400,000 pesos but less than 4,400,000 pesos										Yes								
Swindling (estafa)	If value is more than 1,200,000 pesos but less than 2,400,000 pesos								Yes										
Swindling (estafa)	If value is more than 40,000 pesos but less than 1,200,000 pesos						Yes												
Swindling (estafa)	If value is less than 40,000 pesos					Yes													
Other forms of swindling		Not less than the value of damage caused				Yes													
Swindling a minor						Yes													
Other deceits, including fortune-telling		₱40,000				Yes													
Removal, sale or pledge of mortgaged property						Yes													
Destructive arson																	Yes		
Other forms of arson	Varying circumstances									Yes									
Malicious mischief (property damage)	If damage exceeds 200,000 pesos								Yes										
Malicious mischief (property damage)	If damage exceeds 40,000 pesos, but less than 200.000 pesos					Yes													
Malicious mischief (property damage)	If damage is less than 40,000 pesos		Yes																
Other mischiefs	If damage exceeds 200,000 pesos						Yes												
Other mischiefs	If damage exceeds 40,000 pesos, but less than 200.000 pesos					Yes													
Other mischiefs	If damage is less than 40,000 pesos, or if it cannot be estimated		Yes																
Damage and obstruction to means of communication	If it caused an accident											Yes							
Damage and obstruction to means of communication	All other cases									Yes									
Destroying or damaging statues, public monuments or paintings	Destroy or damage statues or any other useful or ornamental public monument						Yes												
Destroying or damaging statues, public monuments or paintings	Destroy or damage any useful or ornamental painting of a public nature	₱40,000	Yes																

=== Title Eleven: Crimes against chastity ===
Crime	Aggravating, exempting and mitigating circumstances	Fine is not more than (unless specified)	Suspension or disqualification	Arresto menor			Arresto mayor			Prisión correccional			Prisión mayor			Reclusión temporal			Reclusión perpetua	Death
Crime	Aggravating, exempting and mitigating circumstances	Fine is not more than (unless specified)	Suspension or disqualification	Min	Med	Max	Min	Med	Max	Min	Med	Max	Min	Med	Max	Min	Med	Max	Reclusión perpetua	Death
Adultery											Yes									
Concubinage	If the husband									Yes										
Concubinage	If the concubine	The penalty shall be destierro																		
Qualified seduction	All other cases									Yes										
Qualified seduction	If seduced his sister or descendant										Yes									
Simple seduction							Yes													
Acts of lasciviousness with the consent of the offended party							Yes													
Corruption of minors	If a public officer		Temporary absolute disqualification										Yes							
Corruption of minors	All other cases												Yes							
White slave trade														Yes						
Forcible abduction																Yes				
Consented abduction										Yes										

=== Title Twelve: Crimes against civil status of persons ===
Crime	Aggravating, exempting and mitigating circumstances	Fine is not more than (unless specified)	Suspension or disqualification	Arresto menor			Arresto mayor			Prisión correccional			Prisión mayor			Reclusión temporal			Reclusión perpetua	Death
Crime	Aggravating, exempting and mitigating circumstances	Fine is not more than (unless specified)	Suspension or disqualification	Min	Med	Max	Min	Med	Max	Min	Med	Max	Min	Med	Max	Min	Med	Max	Reclusión perpetua	Death
Simulation of births, substitution of one child for another and concealment or abandonment of a legitimate child	If physician or public officer	₱200,000	Temporary special disqualification										Yes							
Simulation of births, substitution of one child for another and concealment or abandonment of a legitimate child	All other cases	₱200,000																		
Usurpation of civil status	If done with the intent to defraud the offended part												Yes							
Usurpation of civil status	All other cases										Yes									
Bigamy													Yes							
Marriage contracted against provisions of laws	If either of the contracting parties shall obtain the consent of the other by means of violence, intimidation or fraud											Yes								
Marriage contracted against provisions of laws	All other cases										Yes									
Premature marriages							Yes													

=== Title Thirteen: Crimes against honor ===
Crime	Aggravating, exempting and mitigating circumstances	Fine is not more than (unless specified)	Arresto menor			Arresto mayor			Prisión correccional			Prisión mayor			Reclusión temporal			Reclusión perpetua	Death
Crime	Aggravating, exempting and mitigating circumstances	Fine is not more than (unless specified)	Min	Med	Max	Min	Med	Max	Min	Med	Max	Min	Med	Max	Min	Med	Max	Reclusión perpetua	Death
Libel means by writings or similar means		₱40,000 to ₱1,200,000							Yes										
Threatening to publish libelous statements and offer to present such publication for a compensation		₱40,000 to ₱400,000				Yes													
Prohibited publication of acts referred to in the course of official libel proceedings		₱40,000 to ₱200,000				Yes													
Slander	If of insulting nature							Yes											
Slander	Not of insulting nature	₱20,000	Yes																
Slander by deed	If of serious nature							Yes											
Slander by deed	Not of serious nature	₱20,000	Yes																
Incriminating innocent person			Yes																
Intriguing against honor		₱20,000	Yes																

=== Title Fourteen: Quasi-offenses (criminal negligence) ===
Crime	Aggravating, exempting and mitigating circumstances	Fine is not more than (unless specified)	Arresto menor			Arresto mayor			Prisión correccional			Prisión mayor			Reclusión temporal			Reclusión perpetua	Death
Crime	Aggravating, exempting and mitigating circumstances	Fine is not more than (unless specified)	Min	Med	Max	Min	Med	Max	Min	Med	Max	Min	Med	Max	Min	Med	Max	Reclusión perpetua	Death
Imprudence and negligence	If intentional act caused a grave felony						Yes												
Imprudence and negligence	If imprudent act caused a grave felony					Yes													
Imprudence and negligence	If act caused damage to property	An amount equal to the value of said damages to 3 times such value																	
Imprudence and negligence	If imprudent act caused some wrong, and if done maliciously, would have been a light felony	₱40,000																	

=== Title Fifteen: Final provisions ===
This includes provisions on crimes committed prior to the code to be applied under the laws at that time, and a repealing clause.

=== Other penalties ===
- Qualified bribery: If any public officer is entrusted with law enforcement and he refrains from arresting or prosecuting an offender who has committed a crime punishable by reclusión perpetua and/or death in consideration of any offer, promise, gift or present, he shall suffer the penalty for the offense which was not prosecuted.
  - If it is the public officer who asks or demands such gift or present, he shall suffer the penalty of death.
- Corruption of public officials: The same penalties on the person corrupted except those of disqualification and suspension, shall be imposed upon any person who shall have made the offers or promises or given the gifts or presents as described in the preceding articles. (Chapter 2, Section 2.)
- Death or physical injuries inflicted under exceptional circumstances
  - Any legally married person who having surprised his spouse in the act of committing sexual intercourse with another person, shall kill any of them or both of them in the act or immediately thereafter, or shall inflict upon them any serious physical injury, shall suffer the penalty of destierro.
  - If he shall inflict upon them physical injuries of any other kind, he shall be exempt from punishment.
- Dueling, if causing injury, will be treated as if it's a normal crime (as serious physical injuries or assault)
- Grave threats: The penalty next lower in degree than that prescribed by law for the crime be threatened to commit, if the offender shall not have attained his purpose, the penalty lower by two degrees shall be imposed.

== Amendments ==
The code has been amended and repealed multiple times:

- Commonwealth Act No. 616, criminalized espionage
- Republic Act No. 10, criminalized usurpation of public authority
- Republic Act No. 1700, outlawed the Communist Party of the Philippines and its successors (later repealed by Republic Act No. 7636)
- Republic Act No. 3019, created the Anti-Graft and Corrupt Practices Act
- Republic Act No. 4200, criminalized wiretapping
- Republic Act No. 6425, criminalized illegal drugs (later amended by Republic Act No. 9165, otherwise known as the Comprehensive Dangerous Drugs Act of 2002)
- Republic Act No. 6539, criminalized carnapping (later amended by Republic Act No. 10883, otherwise known as the New Anti-Carnapping Act of 2016)
- Presidential Decree No. 90, criminalized rumor-mongering
- Presidential Decree No. 449, regulated cockfights
- Presidential Decree No. 483, criminalized sports betting, point shaving, match fixing and the like
- Presidential Decree No. 519, outlawed pinball machines
- Presidential Decree No. 532, criminalized highway robbery
- Presidential Decree No. 749, granted immunity to givers of bribes
- Presidential Decree No. 818, increased penalties for estafa
- Presidential Decree No. 1602, increased penalties for illegal gambling (later amended by Republic Act No. 9287)
- Presidential Decree No. 1613, amended the law on arson
- Presidential Decree No. 1866, regulated firearms (later amended by Republic Act No. 10591, otherwise known as the Comprehensive Firearms and Ammunition Regulation Act)
- Republic Act No. 6968, criminalized coup d'etats
- Republic Act No. 8353, amended the law on rape and increased the penalties for it
- Republic Act No. 9208, established the Intellectual Property Office
- Republic Act No. 9262, criminalized violence against women and their children
- Republic Act No. 9287, criminalized human trafficking (later expanded by Republic Act No. 10364, otherwise known as the Expanded Anti-Trafficking in Persons Act of 2012)
- Republic Act No. 9372 or the Human Security Act, criminalized terrorism (later amended by Republic Act No. 11479, otherwise known as the "Anti-Terrorism Act of 2020")
- Republic Act No. 9851, criminalized crimes against international humanitarian law, genocide and crimes against humanity
- Republic Act No. 10158, decriminalized vagrancy
- Republic Act No. 10175, criminalized acts in cyberspace via the Cybercrime Prevention Act of 2012
- Republic Act No. 10592, amended the law on increasing the good conduct time allowance for prisoners (this remained controversial after the near-release of former Calauan, Laguna mayor Antonio Sanchez, the mastermind in the June 1993 rape-slay of UPLB college student Mary Eileen Sarmenta and killing of her companion Allan Gomez)
- Republic Act No. 10951, updated the values of damages in certain crimes, and the value of fines

== See also ==
- Philippine legal codes
- List of Philippine laws
