= Carlos Celdran =

Filipino artist, tour guide and cultural activist (1972–2019)

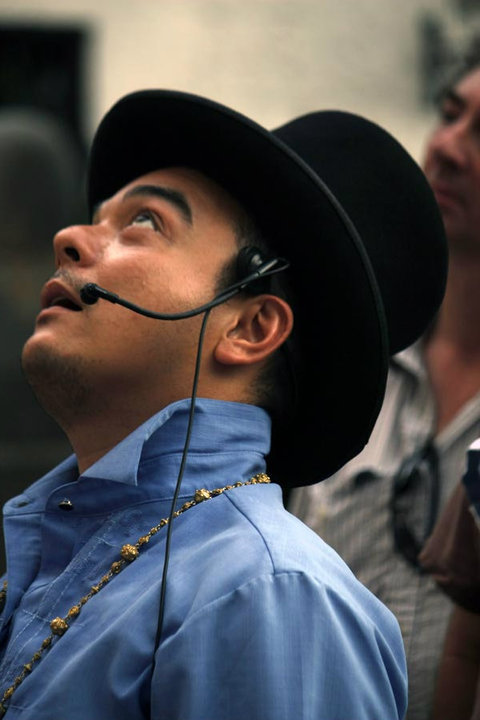
- Celdran on December 20, 2010
- Born: John Charles Edward Pamintuan Celdran; November 10, 1972; Manila, Philippines
- Died: October 13, 2019 (aged 46); Madrid, Spain
- Resting place: Santuario de San Antonio, Makati, Metro Manila, Philippines
- Education: University of the Philippines Diliman; Rhode Island School of Design
- Occupations: Cultural activist; cartoonist; performance artist; tour guide; segment TV host
- Spouse: Tesa Celdran

John Charles Edward "Carlos" Pamintuan Celdran (November 10, 1972 – October 13, 2019) was a Filipino artist, tour guide, segment TV host and cultural activist. He was known for "Walk This Way", a guided tour of the Manila districts of Intramuros, Binondo, and Quiapo using a combination of music, visuals, and history lectures to immerse tourists into what life was like during the Spanish and American colonization periods of the Philippines. He was also known for engaging in a controversial protest, known colloquially as his "Dámaso stunt", in the Manila Cathedral in September 2010, leading to his arrest for "offending religious feelings" as per Article 133 of the Revised Penal Code. In January 2019, the conviction forced Celdran to go on self-exile in Madrid, Spain, where he died of cardiac arrest on October 13 of that year.

== Early life and education ==
Celdran was born as John Charles Edward Pamintuan Celdran, was raised in Dasmariñas Village in Makati. He self-identified as a Catholic, educated by priests when he was a boy.

Celdran graduated from high school at Colegio San Agustin – Makati. He graduated from the University of the Philippines Diliman with a fine arts degree, and from the Rhode Island School of Design with honors and a performance art degree in the 1990s, during which time he also worked various jobs "from cheese-counter boy to fish-station boy, from production assistant of a performance group, to technical director of a dance company".

== Career ==
Celdran began his career as a cartoonist. At age 14, he worked under cartoonist Nonoy Marcelo and would deliver works to the latter’s offices in Business Day and Manila Chronicle. He secured the stint through the connections of the husband of his aunt Patis Tesoro. Celdran joined the Samahang Kartunista ng Pilipinas, a guild of Filipino cartoonists, and became its youngest member. His stint as a cartoonist lasted until he moved to the United States for his college education.

Upon his return to the Philippines, Celdran worked as a tour guide. His well-known and longest-running tour, If These Walls Could Talk, ran 17 years. As part of the guided tour in Manila’s Spanish-era walled city of Intramuros, Celdran would sing, dance, and discuss the history of the place clad in costume.

Another work of Celdran was the one-man show Livin' La Vida Imelda that centered on the lavish lifestyle of Imelda Marcos, the wife of deposed dictator President Ferdinand Marcos. The show was produced by Ma-Yi Theater Company, directed by Ralph Peña at Theater Row's Clurman Theater in New York City and other places outside the Philippines such as Toronto, Ontario, Canada; Copenhagen, Denmark; and Penang, Malaysia. After moving to Madrid, he started the Jose Rizal Walking Tour of Madrid, which took tourists to places where Filipino writer and revolutionary hero José Rizal had frequently visited during his study in the Spanish capital, and provided insights on how Rizal's experience is linked to the Philippine Revolution.

In 2018, Celdran directed and produced the first Manila Biennale in Intramuros, which featured local and international artists.

== Activism ==
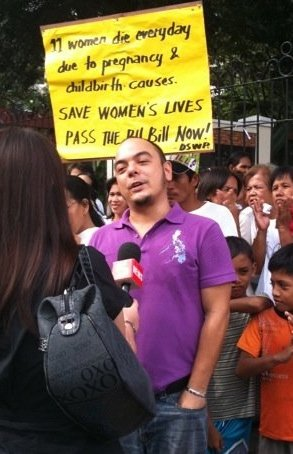
Celdran being interviewed by the media in 2009

=== "Dámaso stunt" ===
Celdran made national headlines after he interrupted an ecumenical meeting that was held in the Manila Cathedral in September 2010, in protest of the Philippine Catholic Church's perceived interference with the passage of the enacted Reproductive Health Bill. He wore a José Rizal outfit, raised a placard that read "Damaso" at the altar, and is quoted as saying "Stop getting involved in politics!" Celdran's stunt, known colloquially as his "Dámaso stunt", led to his arrest for "offending religious feelings" as per Article 133 of the Revised Penal Code. In January 2019, Celdran went into political exile in Madrid, Spain where he resided until his death.

In October 2019, Albay Representative Edcel Lagman (an author of the RH Bill) filed House Bill No. 5170 (the "Carlos Celdran Bill") in Congress, which seeks to repeal Article 133 and, according to Lagman, would uphold the right to freedom of speech and expression guaranteed by the Constitution, and the separation of church and state in the Catholic-majority nation. A petition was also launched at Change.org to push the bill's ratification.

=== Other ===
Celdran also opposed the construction of the Torre de Manila as it obstructed the line of sight behind the Rizal Monument.

== Death ==
Celdran died of cardiac arrest on October 13, 2019, in Madrid, Spain. His widow, Tesa Celdran, confirmed his death.

== See also ==
- Freedom of religion in the Philippines
