= Reclusión perpetua =

Type of judicial punishment in certain Spanish-speaking countries

Reclusión perpetua (Spanish, from Latin: reclusio perpetua, lit. 'permanent imprisonment') is a type of sentence of imprisonment in the Philippines, Argentina, and several other Spanish-speaking countries.

== Laws by region ==
=== Philippines ===
In the Philippines, it is one of two severe penalties, the other being life imprisonment, implemented to replace the death penalty and is in legal parlance near-synonymous with life imprisonment. However, there are some important distinctions between the two terms:

- Unlike life imprisonment, reclusión perpetua carries a maximum sentence of 40 years. (Note: Despite the sentence being indefinite, 20 to 40 years, the maximum period is to be served full term.)
- Reclusión perpetua is prescribed for crimes punishable by the Revised Penal Code, while life imprisonment is imposed on offenses punishable by special laws.
- Reclusión perpetua carries the accessory penalty in which, as defined by Philippine law, the prisoner is barred for life from holding political office. Life imprisonment does not carry this penalty.

Reclusión perpetua is the penalty handed down to inmates convicted of a capital crime (in which case they will be ineligible for parole) as well as what the Republic Act 7659 designates as "heinous crimes" once punishable by death:

- Treason
- Piracy in general and mutiny on the high seas in Philippine waters
- Qualified piracy
- Qualified bribery
- Qualified trafficking
- Parricide
- Murder
- Infanticide
- Kidnapping and serious illegal detention
- Robbery with violence against or intimidation of persons
- Destructive arson
- Rape

The Supreme Court of the Philippines has ruled that the Expanded Good Conduct Time Allowance (GCTA) Law also allows heinous crimes convicts (i.e., those sentenced to reclusión perpetua) to avail for good conduct time credit for early release.
