= Christian Monsod =

Filipino politician

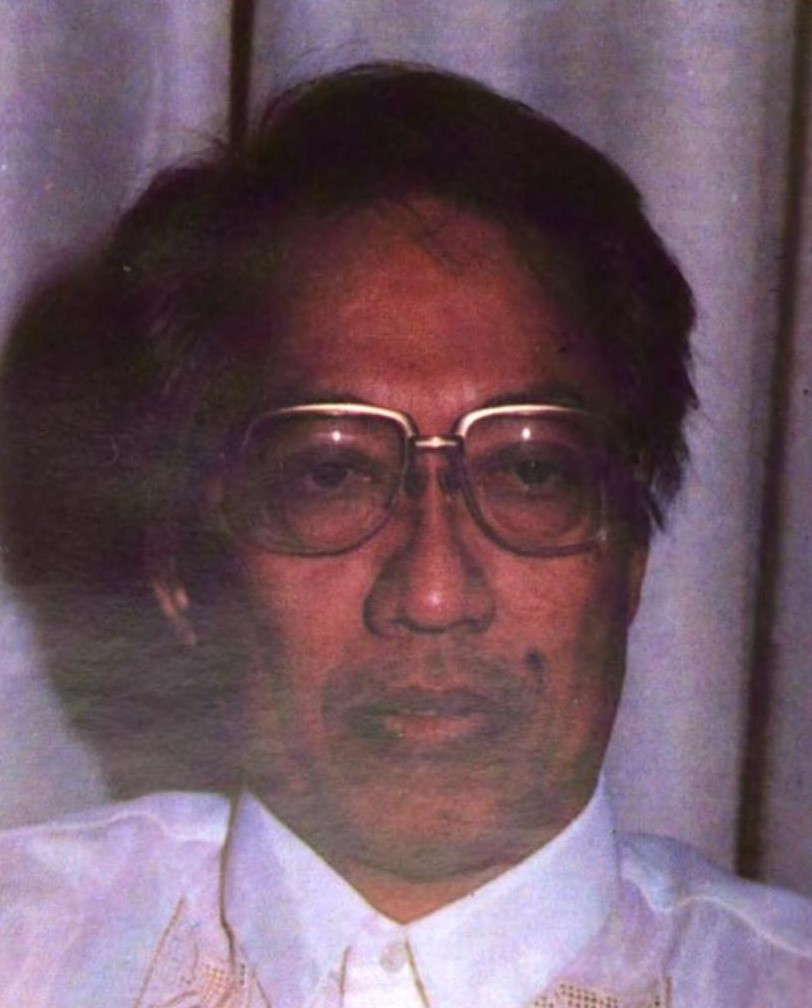
- Monsod from the Official Directory of the Constitutional Commission, c. 1986

Chairperson of the Commission on Elections
- In office June 6, 1991 – February 15, 1995
- Appointed by: Corazon Aquino
- Preceded by: Haydee Yorac
- Succeeded by: Bernardo P. Pardo

Member of the Philippine Constitutional Commission
- In office June 2, 1986 – October 15, 1986
- President: Corazon Aquino

Personal details
- Born: Christian Santos Monsod; July 16, 1936 (age 90) Parañaque, Philippines
- Spouse: Solita Collas
- Children: 5
- Profession: Lawyer

Christian Santos Monsod (born July 16, 1936) is a Filipino lawyer who served as chair of the Commission on Elections (COMELEC). He was one of the framers of the 1987 Constitution of the Philippines. He is the founder and honorary chair of the Legal Network for Truthful Elections (LENTE) and pioneer of the National Citizens' Movement for Free Elections (NAMFREL).

== Early life and education ==
Monsod graduated from the University of the Philippines College of Law. He is a member of the Upsilon Sigma Phi. He passed the bar examinations in 1960.

== Career ==
Monsod worked for his father upon passing the bar. He worked for the World Bank Group from 1963 to 1970, and worked there as an operations officer for about two years in Costa Rica and Panama, negotiating loans and coordinating legal, economic, and project work of the bank. Upon returning to the Philippines in 1970, he worked with the Meralco Group and was chief executive officer of an investment bank and subsequently of a business conglomerate. In 1975, he was awarded the Ten Outstanding Young Men (TOYM) Award for Finance.

He was secretary-general of NAMFREL during the 1986 Philippine presidential election and eventually as its national chair in 1987. During the Corazon Aquino administration, he was appointed chair of the Commission on Elections. Monsod was formerly co-chair of the Bishops Businessmen's Conference for Human Development and has worked with underprivileged sectors, such as farmer and urban poor groups, in initiating, lobbying for, and engaging in affirmative action for the agrarian reform law and lately the urban land reform bill. Since 1986, he has rendered services to various companies as a legal and economic consultant or chief executive officer.

In 1995, he received The Outstanding Filipino (TOFIL) Award for government service and received an honorary Doctorate of Laws from the Ateneo de Manila University. In 2012, he received the Joe C. Baxter Award for his work on election administration.

== Personal life ==
He is married to economist Solita "Winnie" Collas. They have five children.
