= PDP–Laban =

Dutertist populist political party in the Philippines

Partido Demokratiko Pilipino-Lakas ng Bayan
- Party seal
- Abbreviation: PDP-Laban
- President: Sebastian Duterte
- Chairperson: Alfonso Cusi (Acting) (Note: Incumbent chairperson Rodrigo Duterte is detained by the International Criminal Court)
- Secretary-General: Aimee Torrefranca-Neri
- Founders: Nene Pimentel (PDP); Ninoy Aquino (Laban)
- Founded: February 1983; 43 years ago (merger); February 6, 1982 (PDP); 1978 (Laban)
- Merger of: PDP and Laban
- Headquarters: 2/F Doña Elena Tower, Santa Mesa, Manila
- Think tank: PDP–Laban Federalism Institute
- Membership (2021): 100,000
- Ideology: Populism; Federalism; Since 2015: Dutertismo; Sinophilia; Historical: Aquinoism; Social democracy
- Political position: Syncretic
- National affiliation: RAGE Coalition (since 2026) Former: UNIDO (1982–1986); Laban (1987); PDP–Lakas (1988); Koalisyong Pambansa (1992); Lakas–Laban (1995); LAMMP (1998); PPC (2001); KNP (2004); Genuine Opposition (2007); Team PNoy (2013); Coalition for Change (2016–2022); UniTeam (2022–2024); DuterTen (2024–2025)
- Colors: Yellow, dark blue, and red
- Senate: 3 / 24
- House of Representatives: 1 / 318
- Provincial Governors: 4 / 82
- Provincial Vice Governors: 3 / 82
- Provincial Board Members: 14 / 840

Website
- pdplaban.org.ph

The Partido Demokratiko Pilipino-Lakas ng Bayan (PDP-Laban, lit. 'Philippine Democratic Party-Strength of the Nation'), is a Dutertist populist political party in the Philippines founded in 1982. The party is the result of a merger between Partido Demokratiko Pilipino (PDP) and Lakas ng Bayan (Laban). It was part of the country's ruling party coalition from 1986 to 1992 under the administration of Corazon Aquino and served as the country's ruling party from 2016 to 2022 under the administration of Rodrigo Duterte.

Nominally democratic socialist and social democratic, the party has shifted considerably since its first period in power during the 1980s and 1990s. Since Chairman Duterte's election as president, the PDP is generally seen as having strayed from its initial social democratic objectives and shifted toward populism and Dutertismo. Officially, Chairman Duterte has branded himself, and by extension the party, as occupying the centre-left to left-wing. However, the PDP's policies between 2016 and 2022, including the Philippine drug war and proposals to reinstate the death penalty, have led the party to be labelled as populist, syncretic, or "ideologically malleable." Duterte has been described by many observers as a right-wing populist, while the party itself has been described as synthesizing left-wing populist rhetoric with right-wing populist policy.

== History ==
=== 1983–1988 ===
The party now known as PDP–Laban is the result of a merger between the Partido Demokratiko Pilipino and Lakas ng Bayan.

==== Partido Demokratiko Pilipino (PDP) ====
Partido Demokratiko Pilipino (PDP) was founded on February 6, 1982, in Cebu City by Aquilino "Nene" Pimentel Jr. and a group of protesters against the authoritarian government of Ferdinand Marcos, the 10th president of the Philippines, and his ruling party, the Kilusang Bagong Lipunan (KBL). These protesters included the leaders of Cebu City, Davao City and Cagayan de Oro, such as former Cebu 2nd district congressman Antonio Cuenco as the convention's first chairman, Ribomapil Holganza, as the convention's first secretary-general, Zafiro L. Respicio, Rey Magno Teves, Cesar R. Ledesma, Samuel Occeña, Crispin Lanorias and Mords Cua.

Ribomapil Holganza, then the party's Secretary-General, with the support of the other Visayas delegates, proposed the name Katipunan, in honor of the historic Filipino nationalist movement. The convention, however, decided against name proposed by Holganza and decided to retain the name Pilipino Democratic Party. The delegates also created the party's official logo which included the image of Lapu-Lapu as a symbol of the party's adherence to Filipino individualism. The Lapu-Lapu image continues to be a prominent figure in PDP–Laban's logo to this day. The delegates also decided that the Filipino version Partido Demokratiko Pilipino may be used alongside the English version Pilipino Democratic Party.

PDP appealed to the non-communist left, particularly through its emphasis on social democratic principles and organizational participation rather than political personalities Political scientist Alex Magno described PDP as "more advanced… in its analysis of Philippine society and the ills that beset it" compared with the mainstream anti-Marcos groups. PDP was also unique at its time for operating "on the basis of organizational initiative rather than, merely on the basis of personal loyalty to politician-personalities"; and for requiring prospective members to attend a seminar to learn the party's ideology.

==== Merger into PDP–Laban and 1986 snap election ====
In early 1982, talks began between Pimentel Jr. and former senator Benigno Aquino Jr. on the possible merge of PDP with Lakas ng Bayan (LABAN; lit. 'People's Power'), the party founded by Aquino in 1978 for the Interim Batasang Pambansa elections. In a letter sent by Aquino to Senator Lorenzo Tañada dated March 16, Aquino stressed the "umbrella organization" status of LABAN rather than as a political party, being composed of members coming from other political parties. Furthermore, Aquino thought that the merger was not a wise move, given: 1) LABAN's more established name compared to PDP, which was just recently organized; 2) the aforementioned "umbrella organization" status compared to PDP's nature as a political party, and; 3) that some members of LABAN may find the rules of PDP questionable. However, despite these initial concerns, in February 1983, PDP formally merged with LABAN. The merger was complementary, as PDP was mass-based and had its bailiwick in Visayas and Mindanao, while LABAN was composed of traditional politicians and had its bailiwick in Luzon and Metro Manila.

In August 1983, Aquino was assassinated. This, along with an economic crisis, plunged Marcos' popularity and sparked protests. In the parliamentary election of 1984, PDP–Laban and the United Nationalist Democratic Organization (UNIDO) were the major opposition groups. PDP–Laban won six seats. That same year, in anticipation of a snap election, influential opposition figures convened to select a common presidential candidate. Pimentel was included in their shortlist of eleven possible standard bearers. However, UNIDO nominated Salvador Laurel as their presidential candidate. In October 1985, Chino Roces launched the Cory Aquino for President Movement (CAPM), which aimed to nominate Aquino's widow, Corazon, as the opposition's presidential candidate. PDP–Laban was a strong supporter of the movement. In November 1985, Marcos called for a snap presidential election. Later that month, the opposition parties including PDP–Laban formed a new coalition called Laban ng Bayan. Laurel eventually gave way and became Corazon Aquino's running mate under the UNIDO-Laban ng Bayan coalition.

PDP–Laban then aligned itself with UNIDO, which became the main group and leader of the coalition that opposed Marcos. After the People Power Revolution of 1986, which saw Aquino and Laurel proclaimed president and vice president respectively, PDP–Laban continued its alliance with UNIDO until the latter's dissolution in 1987.

==== Laban ng Demokratikong Pilipino split ====
Before the 1988 local elections, some senators including Aquilino Pimentel Jr. criticized the party along with Lakas ng Bansa for their loosening policy towards accepting members of the Kilusang Bagong Lipunan (KBL), a party which was largely composed of Marcos loyalists and sympathizers. In 1988, PDP–Laban was split into two factions: the Pimentel Wing led by Pimentel and the Cojuangco Wing led by Peping Cojuangco The Cojuangco Wing and the Lakas ng Bansa party of House Speaker Ramon Mitra, Jr. merged on September 16, 1988, to form the Laban ng Demokratikong Pilipino (LDP).

After the merger, the prominence of PDP–Laban greatly fell, and the party was not a major party until the 2016 presidential election with the campaign of eventual winner Rodrigo Duterte.

=== 1988–2016 ===
In the Senate, Aquilino Pimentel Jr. had been the person most associated with the party, with him serving multiple terms in the Senate. After he retired, his son Koko Pimentel won an electoral protest to enter the Senate in 2011.

PDP–Laban has become associated with the Binay dynasty of Makati, with Jejomar Binay as its mayor and his allies holding the two districts of Makati in the House of Representatives. Other strongholds of the party include Davao City, where Rodrigo Duterte won multiple terms as mayor.

On July 1, 2015, as part of his bid for the 2016 presidential election, then-Vice President Binay resigned as party chairman and formed the United Nationalist Alliance (UNA). Since then, Senator Aquilino "Koko" Pimentel III headed the party as its national president.

=== Duterte era (2016–2022) ===
PDP–Laban logo from 2017 to 2024

The party was re-grouping, and there are some movements of expansion especially in Mindanao, where it originated, particularly in the Davao region. Two of the party's founders, Crispin Lanorias and Cesar Ledesma, are again active in recent party activities. After the 2016 elections, PDP–Laban signed a coalition agreement with the Nacionalista Party, Lakas–CMD, National Unity Party and the Nationalist People's Coalition, witnessed by then president-elect Rodrigo Duterte.

Immediately after the May 2016 elections, several representatives from other parties moved to PDP–Laban, notably: Geraldine Roman (Bataan), Alfred Vargas (Quezon City), and Ansaruddin Adiong (Lanao del Sur). The party's presence in the House of Representatives eventually grew from three members in the 16th Congress, to 123 members in the current 17th Congress. By April 2018, 300,000 politicians had joined the party, according to Koko Pimentel.

Reacting to the influx of new members, party founder Nene Pimentel urged members to question the motivations of new incoming politicians and ensure they are interested in the party's ideals. He stated that these new members might only be interested in identifying with the current administration, in order to boost their chances of winning in the upcoming 2019 elections.

PDP–Laban plans to learn from the Chinese Communist Party (CCP). It is set to send some of its members to the CCP's school in Fujian for "policy training" to learn more on how the party is organized. The Filipino party also established ties with United Russia, Russia's ruling party, in October 2017. PDP–Laban has also expressed interest in sending a delegation to the Workers' Party of Korea, which is the ruling party of North Korea. A four-member delegation is set to meet with the North Korean party in July 2018.

==== 2018 leadership crisis ====
On July 23, 2018, the same day as Duterte's third State of the Nation Address, an internal leadership dispute within the House of Rpresentatives' majority resulted in former President and current Pampanga Representative Gloria Macapagal Arroyo becoming Speaker of the House, replacing Pantaleon (Bebot) Alvarez. The resolution was adopted that same night with 184 voting in favor and 12 abstaining. Arroyo was previously a member of Lakas–CMD, before switching to PDP–Laban in 2017.

Some representatives, including Deputy Speaker Rolando Andaya (Camarines Sur), had been eyeing to shift towards other political parties after Arroyo's ascendance to the House's leadership. Andaya also had said that some lawmakers might join Lakas–CMD, Arroyo's former party, and merge with Sara Duterte-Carpio's Hugpong ng Pagbabago (HNP). Duterte-Carpio denied rumors that members of PDP–Laban were seeking to move into HNP, which is a regional party based in Davao Region.

Succeeding these events, a faction sought to unseat PDP–Laban's high-ranking officials. Willy Talag, president of the party's Makati city council and chair of the membership committee of the NCR Chapter, said during an assembly of the party on July 27 that PDP–Laban's current leaders have committed violations, including holding mass oath-taking of members “without proper basic seminar” and swearing-in officials that are “involved in illegal drugs." The faction elected Rogelio Garcia and Talag as party president and chairman, respectively, removing Senator Aquilino "Koko" Pimentel III and Rep. Pantaleon Alvarez from their respective positions.

Koko Pimentel dismissed the election of new leaders, disowning the group and assembly, and called the event an "unofficial, unauthorized, rogue assembly using the name of PDP–Laban". Sen. Pimentel, who has personally dismissed the election, together with PDP–Laban vice chairman and Department of Energy Sec. Alfonso Cusi, and Rep. Alvarez have notified members that the supposed national assembly was not officially sanctioned by the party. Special Assistant to the President Bong Go said in an interview with CNN Philippines that Chairman Duterte is set to meet the two factions, in an effort to unite the party.

==== 2019 general election ====
Months later, on November 30, the Commission on Elections (COMELEC) released a statement recognizing Pimentel's group as the legitimate leadership of PDP–Laban. Following this, Pimentel has said that his faction will not recognize candidates from the Garcia wing.

The party secured three new seats in the Senate after winning the 2019 general election, with Bato dela Rosa, Francis Tolentino, and Bong Go joining the upper house, increasing the number of PDP–Laban senators to five. Meanwhile, the party kept its majority in the House of Representatives, forming a coalition with the Nacionalista Party, Nationalist People's Coalition, Lakas–CMD, some members of the Liberal Party, and several party-lists.

In 2020, amidst the COVID-19 pandemic, Manny Pacquiao was installed as party president, replacing Pimentel.

==== 2021 party faction dispute and 2022 election ====
The party logo being used by both factions during the 2021 leadership dispute.

The former official logo of the party from 1983 to 2016, which contains an illustration of Lapu-Lapu. The current logo included the figure on top of a clenched fist. The Pacquiao-Pimentel wing of the party reused this version of the logo during the 2021 leadership dispute.

Manny Pacquiao was elected to the position of PDP–Laban president in December 2020 under an acting capacity. An internal rift in within the party started in early 2021, when Pacquiao criticized Philippine President Rodrigo Duterte's policy regarding the South China Sea dispute, finding Duterte's response against China's assertions of its claim in the area as lacking. Duterte, also the PDP–Laban chairman, rebuked Pacquiao's criticisms and took offense to a statement attributed to Pacquiao that his administration was more corrupt than his predecessors. Pacquiao also came into conflict with PDP–Laban vice chairman Alfonso Cusi.

On July 17, 2021, amidst the split between Pacquiao and Cusi, Alfonso Cusi was elected as the party's president in a meeting attended by President Duterte.

On September 9, 2021, the Cusi-led faction of PDP–Laban would nominate Duterte as their vice presidential nominee for the 2022 election but without a standard bearer for the presidency. However, during the filing of candidacies, Duterte backed down from running as vice president. On September 19, 2021, the Pacquiao-led Pimentel faction of PDP–Laban formally nominated Pacquiao as their presidential candidate for 2022. During the filing of the candidacy, Pacquiao announced that Lito Atienza will be his running mate. Both ran under the Osmeña-founded PROMDI on the ballot.

On October 8, 2021, senators Bato dela Rosa and Bong Go filed their candidacy for president and vice president, respectively, as standard bearers for the Duterte-Cusi faction. On November 13, 2021, dela Rosa withdrew his candidacy with Go taking his place as the faction's presidential nominee. One month after, Go also withdrew his candidacy, leaving the Duterte-Cusi faction without a nominee in the 2022 election.

On January 21, 2022, the Duterte-Cusi faction announced Sara Duterte as their adopted candidate for vice president; the Cusi wing later supported her running mate, Bongbong Marcos, a son of a former President Ferdinand Marcos, on March 22, 2022. The endorsement of Marcos by the Cusi wing is criticized by both Pimentel and the original members of the party as PDP–Laban was established to oppose the Marcos dictatorship.

The Pimentel-Pacquiao faction meanwhile maintained that Pacquiao and Atienza are the "genuine" standard bearers of PDP–Laban.

On May 5, 2022, PDP–Laban has been declared by the Commission on Elections as the "dominant majority party" for the 2022 elections. The Comelec en banc made the decision despite the pending leadership dispute within the ruling party.

The party's two factions have both applied for accreditation as the dominant majority party, thus, PDP–Laban “shall be treated as one single political party for purposes of determining the dominant majority party," as stated in the COMELEC's Resolution No. 10787 which was promulgated on May 4. In the same issuance, COMELEC also declared the Nacionalista Party (NP) as the "dominant minority party." As the dominant majority, PDP–Laban will be entitled to 5th copy of the election returns and 7th copy of the certificates of canvass, as well as getting preference in the deployment of election watchers.

On May 6, 2022, days before the 2022 elections, the COMELEC recognized the Duterte-Cusi faction as the legitimate and official PDP–Laban.

=== Post-Duterte administration ===
Following the end of Chairman Rodrigo Duterte's term as president on June 30, 2022, PDP–Laban saw the departure of its members for the majority Lakas–CMD or the ruling Partido Federal ng Pilipinas, which is headed by Duterte's successor, Bongbong Marcos.

On April 19, 2024, during the party's national council meeting held at the Nustar Resort and Casino in Cebu City,it was announced that it would field incumbent Senators Ronald Dela Rosa, Bong Go, and Francis Tolentino and actor Phillip Salvador for the 2025 Philippine Senate election. Tolentino later resigned from the party in mid-2024 over difference on stance in the South China Sea dispute, leaving Dela Rosa, Go, and Salvador for renomination on September 20. Party Vice Chairman Alfonso Cusi clarified that "Laban" would be retained in the official party name to avoid complications with the Commission on Elections in the 2025 elections.

Koko Pimentel, the leader of the opposing faction, criticized the rebranding, suggesting that the Duterte-Cusi faction should have created a new party instead, as he believes their actions aimed to erase the party's identity as a "left-of-center" organization. On September 5, 2024, Davao City Mayor Sebastian Duterte, son of Party Chairman Rodrigo Duterte, joined the party as its new member and executive vice chairperson.

On September 20, 2024, PDP-Laban formally formed an alliance for the 2025 elections with Partido para sa Demokratikong Reporma, Pederalismo ng Dugong Dakilang Samahan and the Mayor Rodrigo Roa Duterte-National Executive Coordinating Committee (MRRD-NECC). Greco Belgica and Pantaleon Alvarez signed the agreement. In October 2024, the initial senatorial nominees—Ronald Dela Rosa, Bong Go, and Phillip Salvador—filed their candidacies for the Senate. Singer Jimmy Bondoc, former Cagayan Economic Zone Authority administrator & CEO Raul Lambino, and lawyer Jayvee Hinlo also filed as the additional senatorial candidates representing the party. Independents Victor Rodriguez, Rodante Marcoleta, and Apollo Quiboloy were also added into the lineup, ending up with nine senatorial candidates. Eric Martinez, the party vice president for Luzon and independent senatorial candidate, opted not to be included in the slate as he intends to "discharge any political bandages." The party launched their senatorial slate's campaign on February 13, 2025, at the Club Filipino in San Juan, Metro Manila. On April 10, 2025, pediatrician and content creator Richard Mata (an independent candidate and Bong Go's uncle) officially joined the slate, completing the "Duter-Ten" lineup (the word "Duter-Ten" is a portmanteau of "Duterte" and "ten", a reference to a ten PDP candidates approved and supported by the former president Rodrigo Duterte). On May 10, 2025, two days before the midterm elections, former Alyansa para sa Bagong Pilipinas senatorial candidates Camille Villar and re-electionist and presidential sister Imee Marcos were accepted as the party's guest candidates.

On July 8, 2025, the Supreme Court recognized the Cusi-Matibag faction as the legitimate grouping of the PDP-Laban.

Mayor Sebastian Duterte (center) with Senator Bong Go and Senator Robin Padilla after he appointed as President of the PDP in April 2026.

On April 11, 2026 Sebastian Duterte officially became the party president of the PDP-Laban replacing senator Robin Padilla. The next day on April 12, 2026, the party along with the Reform PH Party and Partido para sa Demokratikong Reporma formed the RAGE Coalition.

On May 10, 2026, PDP-Laban warned that congressmen who will vote to impeach Sara Duterte on May 11, 2026 will be black listed, not allowed to cross into the party, no political refuge, no political endorsements from the party, and will not be allowed to run under the party and when necessary, the party will file their own candidate in the congressman's district.

== Ideology and platform ==
Historically, PDP–Laban claimed to be a centre-left or left-wing party that describes itself as a democratic socialist, social-democratic, and populist party. In spite of this, the party is seen as having little to do with the Western concept of democratic socialism. According to scholar Joseph Chinyong Liow, PDP-Laban operates as do many Philippine political parties: "weak, ideologically malleable, and often merely vehicles of personal ambitions", centered around Rodrigo Duterte specifically. Chinyong Liow describes the synthesis of the party under Chairman Duterte of left-wing populist rhetoric, such as poverty reduction and consensus decision-making, and right-wing populist actions, such as the Philippine drug war launched upon Duterte taking office. The party has also recently taken influence from the Chinese Communist Party.

It has adopted a preference for bilateral dialogue with China when it comes to resolving the South China Sea dispute.

The party also has federalist tendencies. The party advocates a transition to a federal, presidential form of government from the current unitary presidential system through a revision of the present 1987 Constitution of the Philippines. According to self-published materials, the party seeks a peaceful and democratic way of life characterized by "freedom, solidarity, justice, equity, social responsibility, self-reliance, efficiency and enlightened nationalism". It has touted as its five guiding principles the following: theism, authentic humanism, enlightened nationalism, democratic socialism, and consultative and participatory democracy. The context of its espoused ideology has been in dispute, however, due to the party's recent pro-China, pro-Russia and North Korea-friendly stance since Chairman Duterte's rise in the party.

== Symbols ==
From the 1980s, the 'Laban' or 'L' sign was a hand gesture used by the party, along with other members of the UNIDO coalition, which originally supported Corazon Aquino. This was done by raising the thumb and index finger over the forehead, forming a letter "L' shape. This was popularized during the People Power Revolution. During the campaign and presidency of Rodrigo Duterte, the Laban sign fell into disuse within PDP–Laban and was replaced with a clenched fist, a gesture popularized by Duterte. The clenched fist was later included in the party's current logo.

== Party officials ==
As of August 2026:

- President: Davao City Mayor Sebastian Duterte
- Executive Vice President: Atty. Jimmy Bondoc
- Chairman: Former Philippine President Rodrigo Duterte
- Vice Chairman: Former Energy Secretary Alfonso Cusi
- Vice President for NCR: Penny Belmonte
- Vice President for Luzon: Joseph Edward Villareal
- Vice President for Visayas: Former Cebu City Mayor Mike Rama
- Vice President for Mindanao: Representative Shirlyn Bañas-Nograles
- Vice President for International Relations: Atty. Raul Lambino
- Secretary-General: Atty. Wendel Avisado
- Treasurer: Atty. Aimee Torrefranca-Neri
- Auditor: Senator Bong Go
- Executive Director: Joseph “Joy” Encabo

=== Party presidents ===
Image	Name	Political office	Start of term	End of term
	Koko Pimentel	President of the Senate of the Philippines	Early 2010s	December 3, 2020
	Manny Pacquiao	Senator of the Philippines	December 3, 2020	July 17, 2022
	Alfonso Cusi	Secretary of Energy	July 17, 2022	August 29, 2022
	Jose Alvarez	House representative from Palawan's 2nd congressional district	September 29, 2022	June 10, 2024
	Robin Padilla	Senator of the Philippines	July 24, 2024	April 11, 2026
	Sebastian Duterte	Mayor of Davao City	June 16, 2025 (Acting)	April 11, 2026 (Acting)
	Sebastian Duterte	Mayor of Davao City	April 11, 2026	Incumbent

== Elected members ==
=== 20th Congress (2025–present) ===
==== Senators ====
Name	Took office	Bloc
Ronald "Bato" dela Rosa	June 30, 2019	Minority
Bong Go	June 30, 2019	Minority
Robin Padilla	June 30, 2022	Minority

==== District Representatives ====
Name	District	Took office	Bloc
Shirlyn Bañas-Nograles	General Santos's lone congressional district	June 30, 2025	Majority

==== Governors ====
Name	Province	Took office
Angelica Amante	Agusan del Norte	June 30, 2022
Melecio Go	Marinduque	June 30, 2025
Humerlito Dolor	Oriental Mindoro	June 30, 2019
Pam Baricuatro	Cebu	June 30, 2025

== Candidates for Philippine general elections ==
=== 2016 ===
==== Presidential ticket ====
- Rodrigo Duterte for president (formally announced candidacy on November 21, 2015 and officially filed Certificate of Candidacy on November 27 and December 8) – WON
- Martin Diño (Note: Diño earlier stated that should he withdraw his intention to run for president, Davao City Mayor Rodrigo Duterte would be his substitute.) (filed his candidacy on October 16, 2015, withdrawn on October 29)
- Alan Peter Cayetano for vice president (Note: Guest candidate; a member of the Nacionalista Party)

=== 2019 ===
==== Senatorial candidates ====
- Ronald dela Rosa – WON
- Bong Go – WON
- Dong Mangudadatu – LOST
- Koko Pimentel – WON
- Francis Tolentino – WON

=== 2022 ===
The party under Cusi wing endorsed the UniTeam ticket of Bongbong Marcos for president and Sara Duterte for vice president. Senator Ronald dela Rosa filed his candidacy as the party's official candidate for president but withdrew shortly thereafter.

==== Senatorial candidates ====
===== Cusi faction =====
Candidate	Party	Position	Elected
Robin Padilla	PDP–Laban	Actor and TV Host	Yes
Salvador Panelo	PDP–Laban	Former Chief Presidential Legal Counsel (2016–2021)	No
*~~Rodante Marcoleta~~ (later withdrawn)	PDP–Laban	Member of the House of Representatives from SAGIP Partylist	
Rey Langit	PDP–Laban	Broadcast Journalist	No
Astra Pimentel-Naik	PDP–Laban	Former Executive Director of the Commission on Filipinos Overseas (2018–2021)	No
John Castriciones	PDP–Laban	Former Secretary of Agrarian Reform (2017–2021)	No
Greco Belgica	PDDS	Former Chairman of the Presidential Anti-Corruption Commission (2021)	No

===== Pacquiao faction =====
Candidate	Party	Position	Elected
Lutgardo Barbo	PDP–Laban	Secretary to the Senate	No

=== 2025 ===
==== Senatorial candidates ====
Candidate	Party	Position	Elected
Jimmy Bondoc	PDP	Former Member of Board of Directors of Philippine Amusement and Gaming Corporation (2021–2022)	No
Ronald dela Rosa	PDP	Incumbent senator	Yes
Bong Go	PDP	Incumbent senator	Yes
Jayvee Hinlo	PDP	Former Commissioner of the Presidential Anti-Corruption Commission (2021–2022)	No
Raul Lambino	PDP	Former Chief Executive Officer of the Cagayan Economic Zone Authority (2017–2022)	No
Rodante Marcoleta	Independent	Member of the House of Representatives from SAGIP Partylist	Yes
Imee Marcos	Nacionalista (Note: Guest candidate)	Incumbent senator	Yes
Richard Mata	Independent	None (physician)	No
Apollo Quiboloy	Independent	Former spiritual adviser to President Rodrigo Duterte (2016–2022)	No
Vic Rodriguez	Independent	Former Executive Secretary (2022)	No
Phillip Salvador	PDP	None (actor)	No
Camille Villar	Nacionalista	Member of the House of Representatives from Las Piñas' at-large district	Yes

== Election results ==
=== Presidential and vice presidential elections ===
Year	Presidential election				Vice presidential election			
Year	Candidate	Votes	Vote share	Result	Candidate	Votes	Vote share	Result
1986	Corazon Aquino (UNIDO)	7,909,320 (Note: In the nullified COMELEC vote, Aquino received 9,291,716 votes.)	51.74% (Note: In the nullified COMELEC vote, Aquino received 46.10%)	Disputed (Note: Aquino assumes the presidency)	None, Aquino's running mate was Salvador Laurel (UNIDO)			Disputed (Note: Laurel assumes the vice presidency)
1992	None; Pimentel's running mate was Jovito Salonga (Liberal)			Lost	Nene Pimentel	2,023,289	9.91%	Lost
1998	None			—N/a	None			—N/a
2004	None			—N/a	None			—N/a
2010	None; Binay's running mate was Joseph Estrada (PMP)			Lost	Jejomar Binay	14,645,574	41.65%	Won
2016	Rodrigo Duterte	16,601,997	39.01%	Won	None; Duterte's running mate was Alan Peter Cayetano (Nacionalista)			Lost
2022	None; endorsed Bongbong Marcos (PFP) (Note: Marcos and Duterte were endorsed by the Duterte-Cusi wing, while Pacquiao and Atienza ran under the Pimentel wing.)			Won	None; endorsed Sara Duterte (Lakas–CMD)			Won
2022	Manny Pacquiao (PROMDI)	3,663,113	6.81%	Lost	None; Pacquiao's running mate was Lito Atienza (PROMDI)			Lost

=== Legislative elections ===
==== Batasang Pambansa ====
Batasang Pambansa
Year	Leader	Seats won	Votes	Share	Result	+/–
1984	Nene Pimentel	6 / 197	1,344,607	2.27%	Minority	N/A

==== Congress ====
House elections	Seats won	+/–	Result	Senate elections	Seats won	Seats after	+/–	Result
1987	43 / 200	▲37	Majority	1987	Participated under Lakas ng Bayan	3 / 24	N/A	Majority
1992	Participated under Koalisyong Pambansa		Minority	1992	Participated under Koalisyong Pambansa	1 / 24	▼2	Lost
1995	1 / 204	N/A	Minority	1995	0 / 12	0 / 24	▼1	Lost
1998	0 / 258	▼1	Lost	1998	1 / 12	1 / 24	▲1	Majority
2001	1 / 256	▲1	Minority	2001	1 / 13	2 / 24	▲1	Minority
2004	2 / 261	▲1	Minority	2004	Participated under Koalisyon ng Nagkakaisang Pilipino	1 / 24	▼1	Minority
2007	5 / 270	▲3	Minority	2007	0 / 12	1 / 24	Steady	Minority
2010	2 / 286	▼3	Minority	2010	0 / 12	0 / 24	▼1	Lost
2013	0 / 292	▼1	Lost	2013	1 / 12	1 / 24	▲1	Majority
2016	3 / 297	▲3	Majority	2016	Did not participate	2 / 24	Steady	Majority
2019	82 / 304	▲79	Majority	2019	4 / 12	5 / 24	▲3	Majority
2022	66 / 316	▼22	Majority	2022	1 / 12	4 / 24	Steady	Split
2025	2 / 317	▼64	Majority	2025	2 / 12	3 / 24	▼1	Majority

== See also ==
- Laban ng Demokratikong Pilipino
- Rodrigo Duterte
