= L sign =

The L sign may refer to:

- Loser (hand gesture)
- Laban sign
