= Duterte fist =

Hand gesture

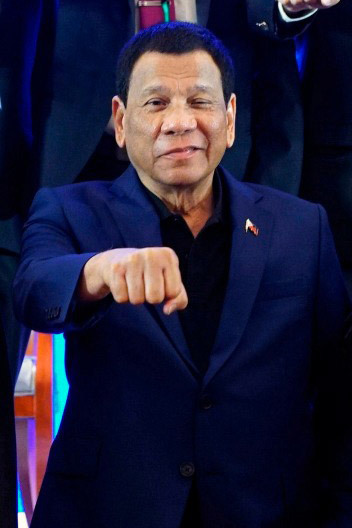
President Rodrigo Duterte with his signature gesture in April 2019

The Duterte fist (or Duterte fist bump) is a hand gesture made by raising a clenched fist at chest or eye level. The gesture serves as a signature political symbol of Philippine president Rodrigo Duterte, his administration and allies, and his supporters.

== Usage ==
During meetings with Duterte, some visitors and personalities would often pose for photos with Duterte doing the signature fist gesture; these included Chinese actor Jackie Chan, Chinese tycoon Jack Ma, Hollywood actor Steven Seagal, Japanese Prime Minister Shinzo Abe, and Malaysian Prime Minister Mahathir Mohamad.

Some critics of Duterte view the fist gesture to represent Duterte's war on drugs. During his visit to the Philippines in 2017, Australian spy chief Nick Warner has been criticized for doing the fist gesture alongside Duterte in a photo shoot; US President Donald Trump was also warned from doing the gesture during his planned trip to the Philippines later that year. Supreme Court Associate Justice Rodil Zalameda in 2019 was also criticized for doing the gesture moments after being appointed by Duterte over concerns of independence of the judiciary from the executive department.

The Duterte fist was included in the new logo of Duterte's party, PDP-Laban, as part of the party's rebranding of itself in Duterte's image since 2016.

== Online use ==
The Fisted Hand Sign Emoji (U+1F44A 👊 FISTED HAND SIGN) has been used to represent the gesture in social media.

== Gallery ==
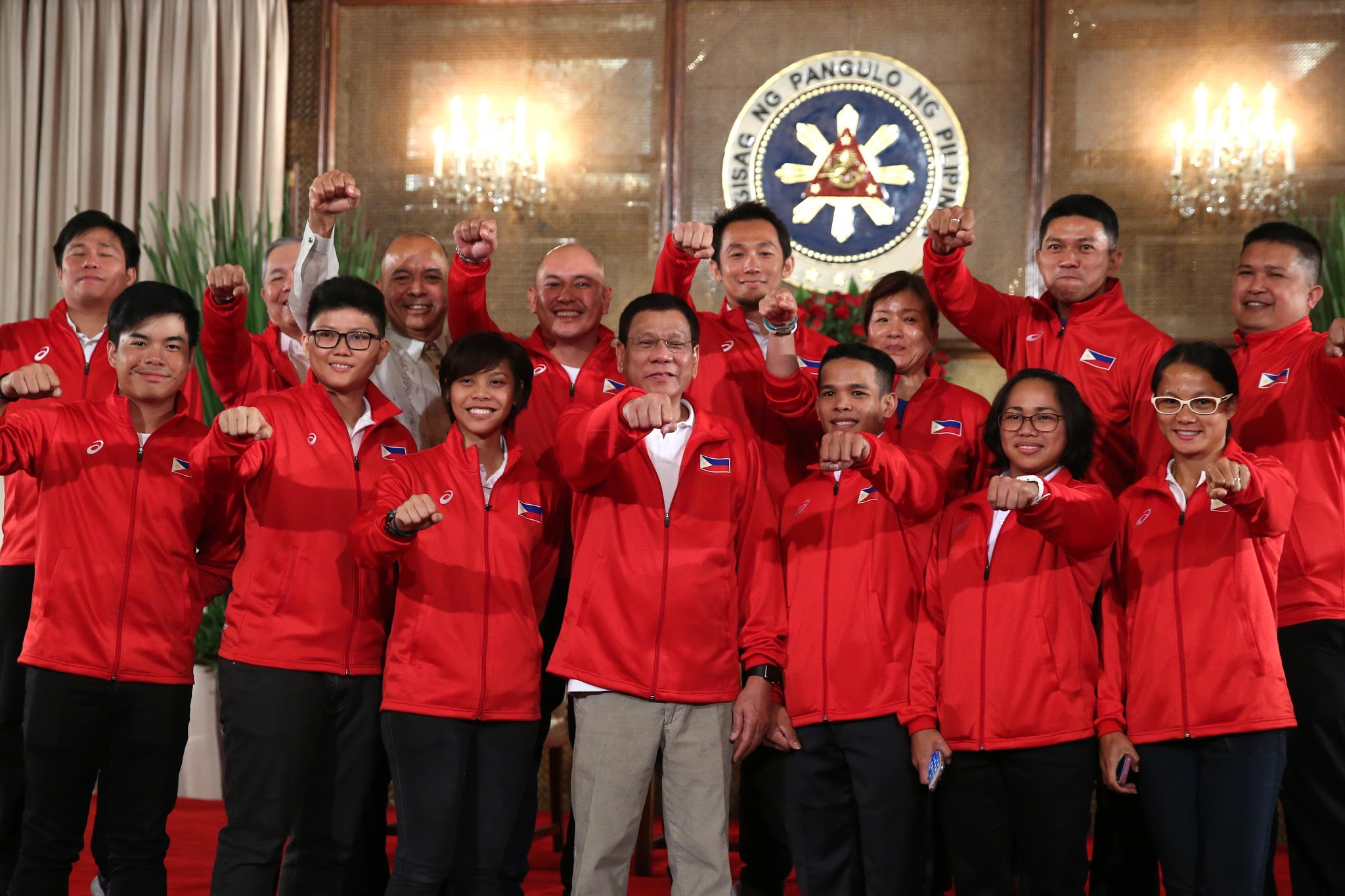
Duterte with the Philippine delegation to the 2016 Summer Olympics

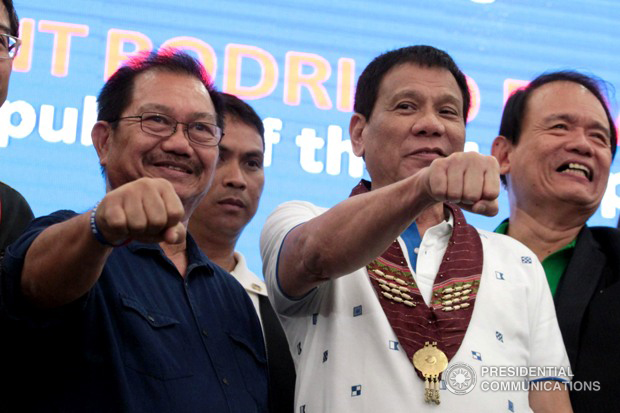
Rodrigo Duterte (right) and Emmanuel Piñol (left) doing the Duterte fist

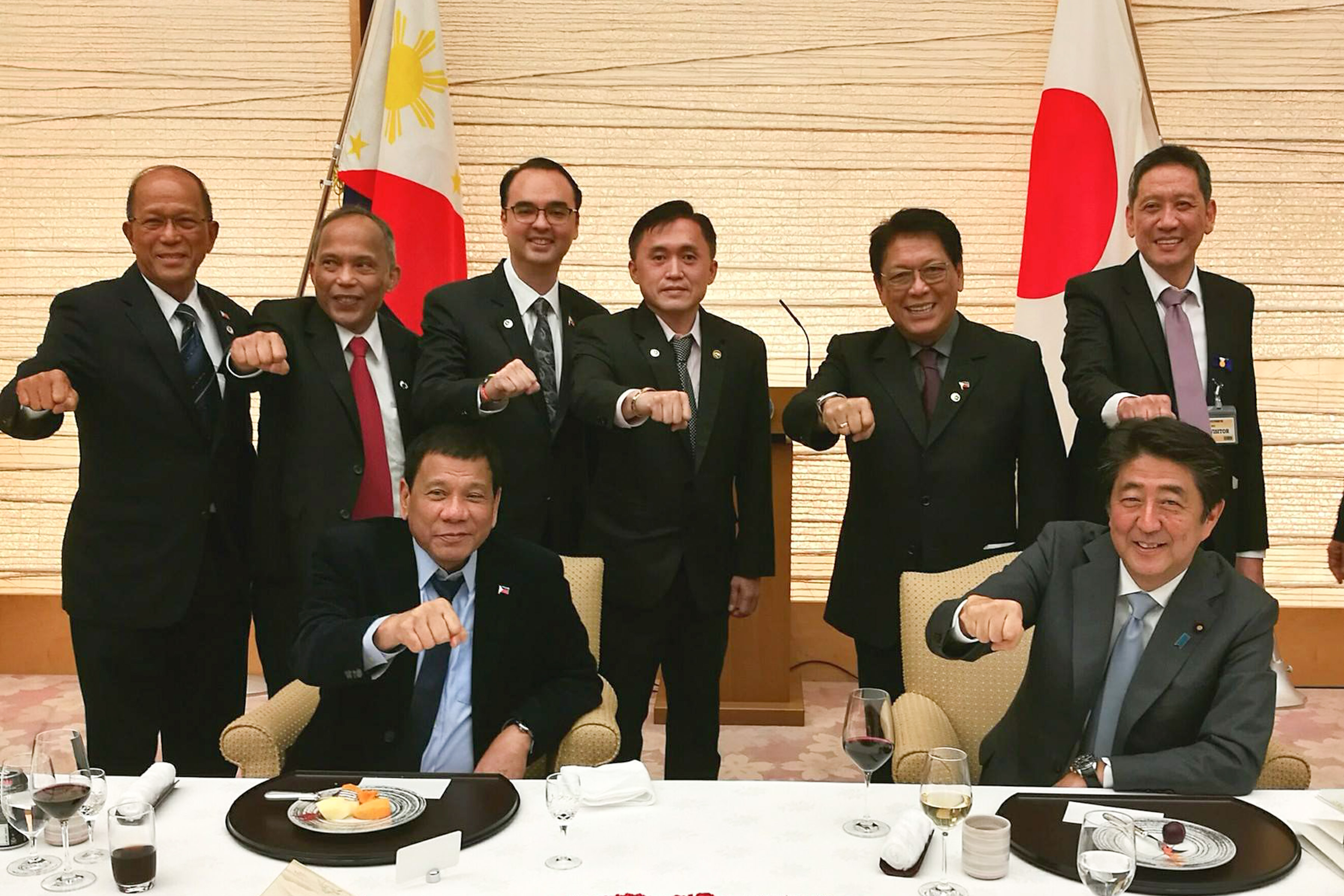
Duterte with Japanese Prime Minister Shinzo Abe and other Japanese and Philippine officials

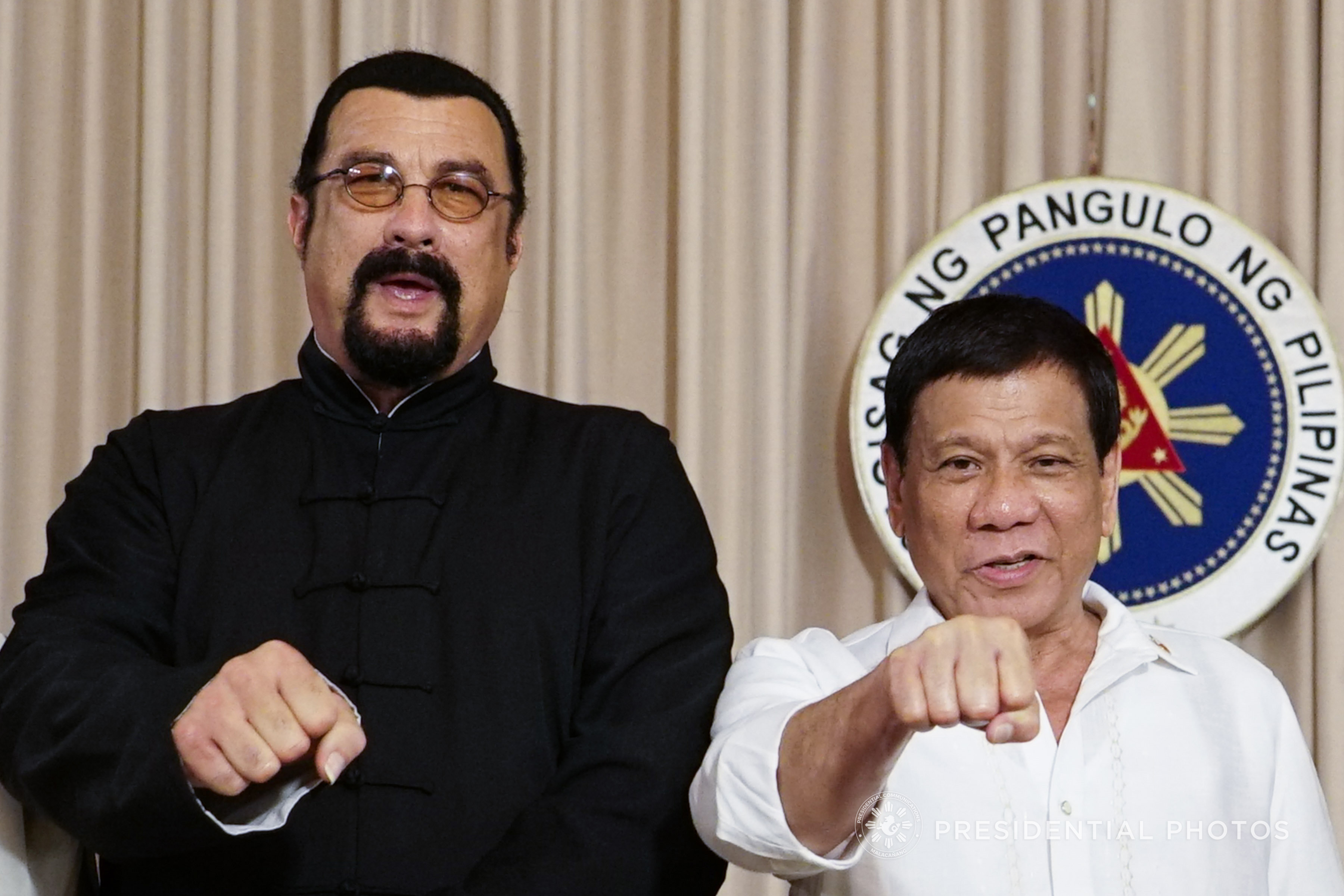
Duterte (right) does his signature pose with actor Steven Seagal in Malacañang Palace on October 12, 2017.

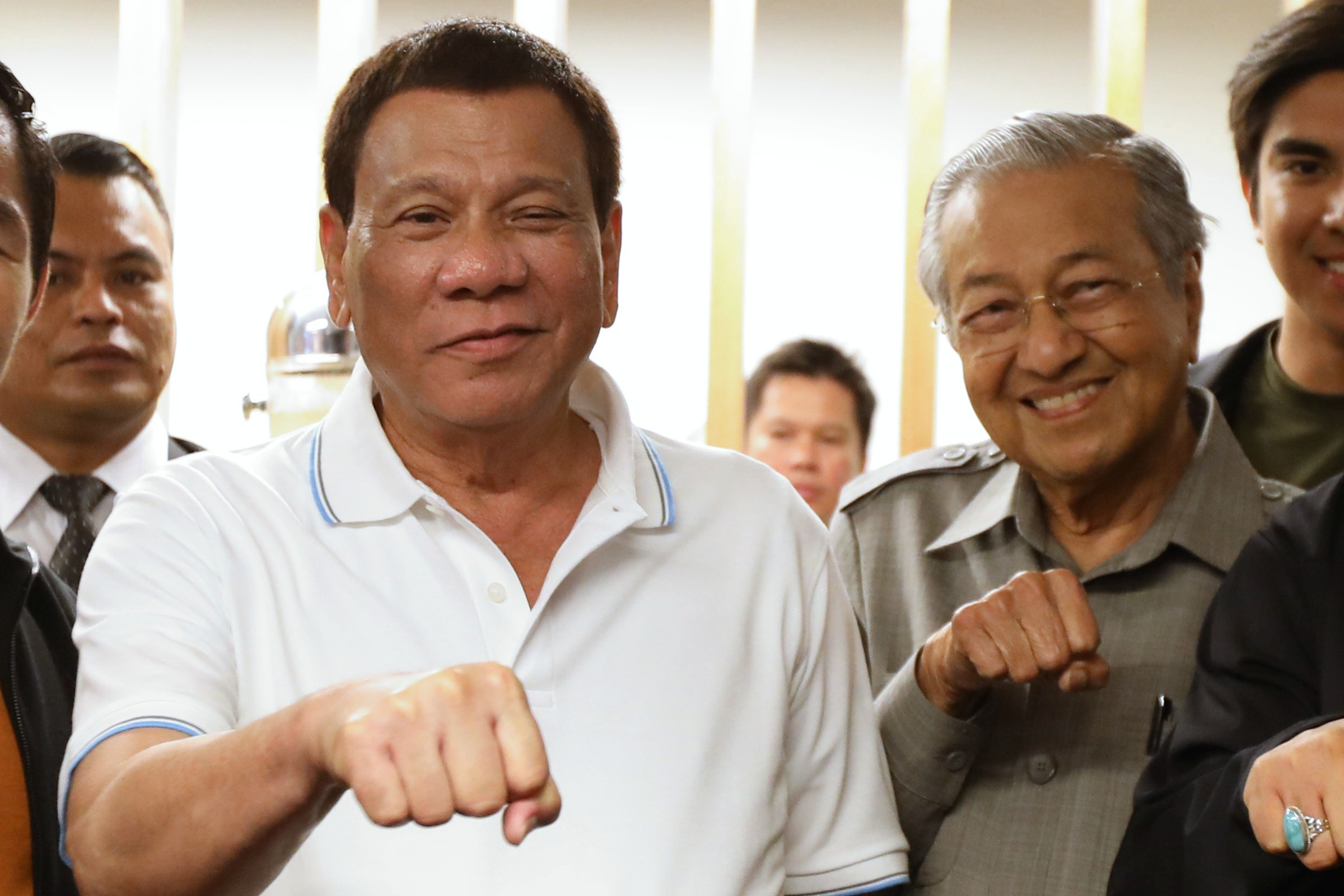
Duterte strikes his signature pose with Malaysia Prime Minister Mahathir Mohamad

Rodrigo Duterte (center) with his daughter Sara Duterte (left) and Bong Go (right) strikes their signature pose

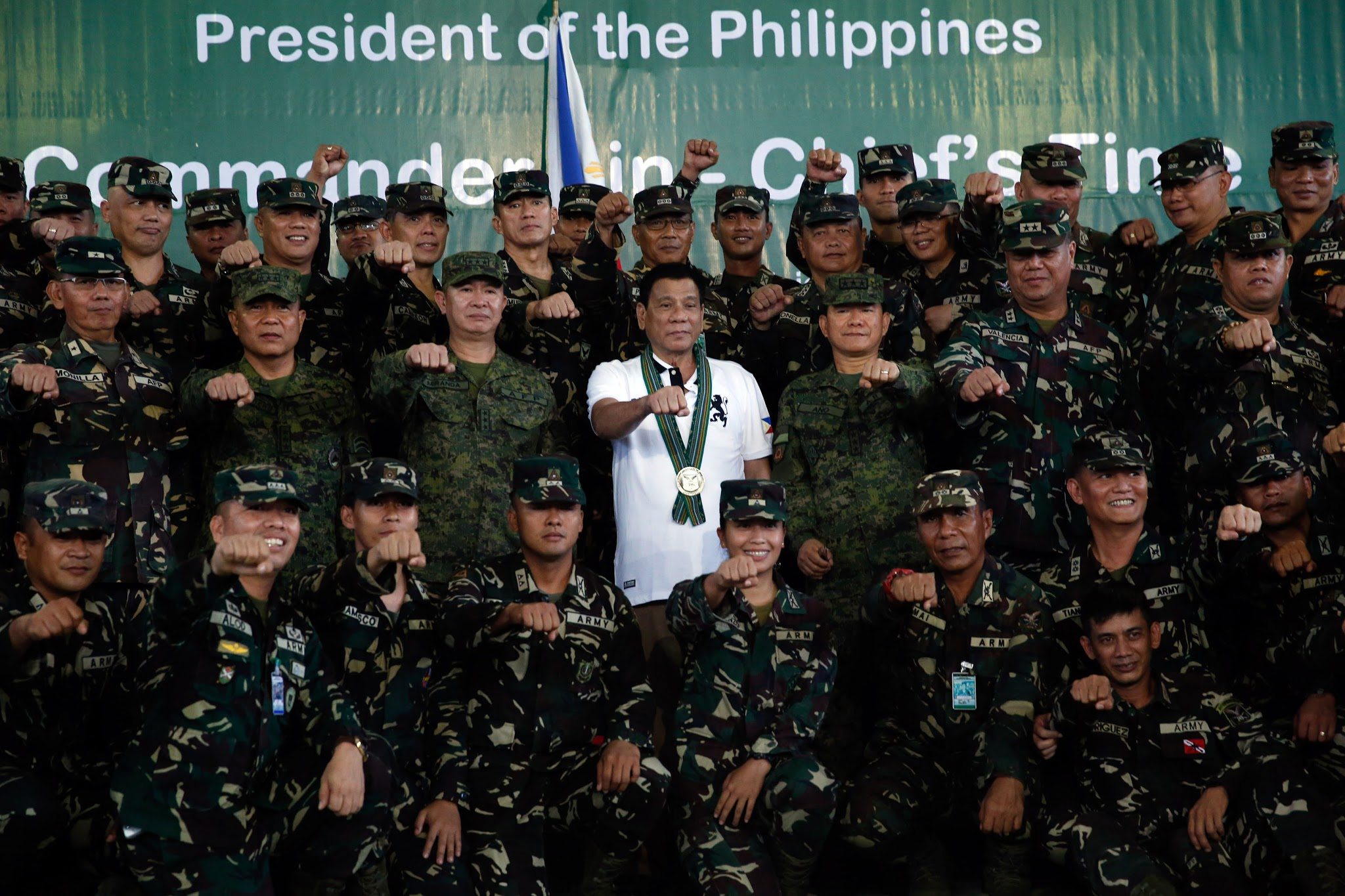
Duterte with the soldiers at the 10th Infantry Division

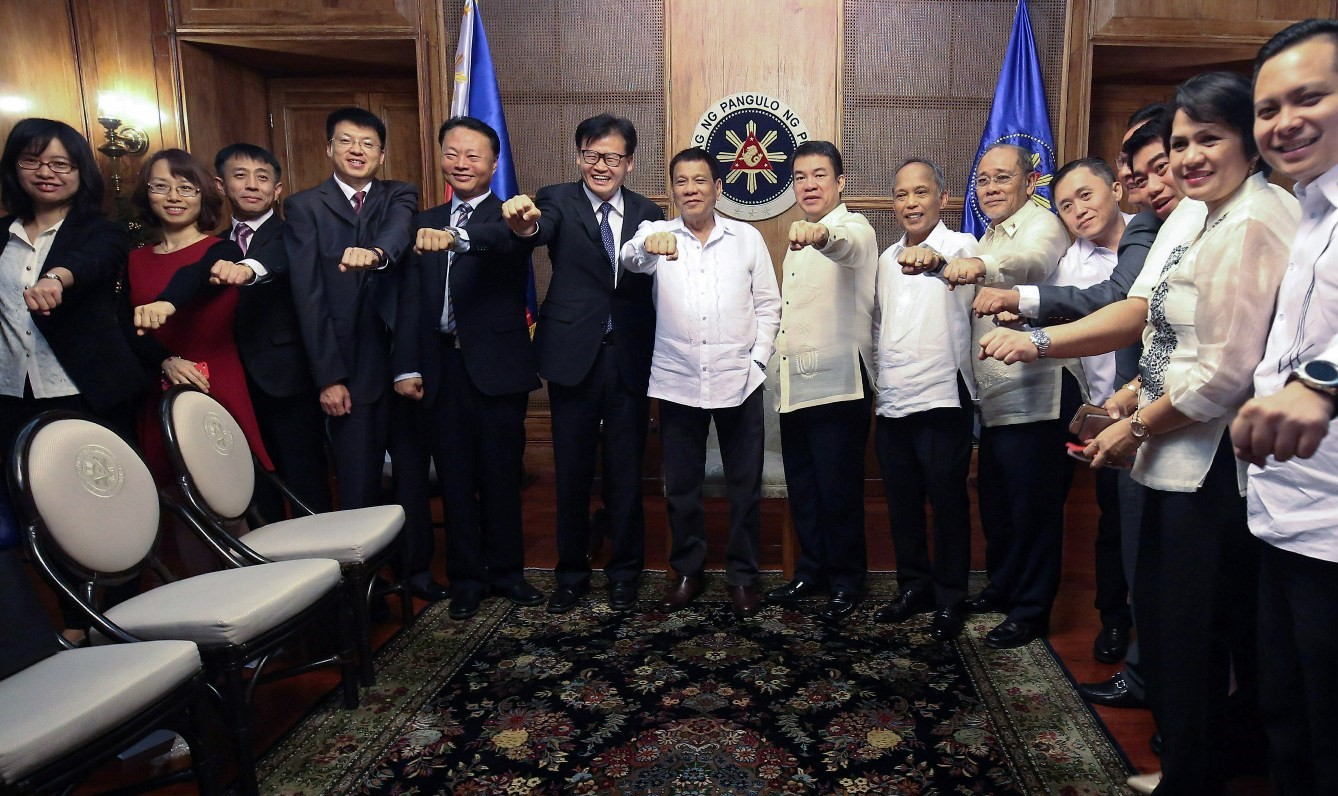
Duterte with Chinese government officials

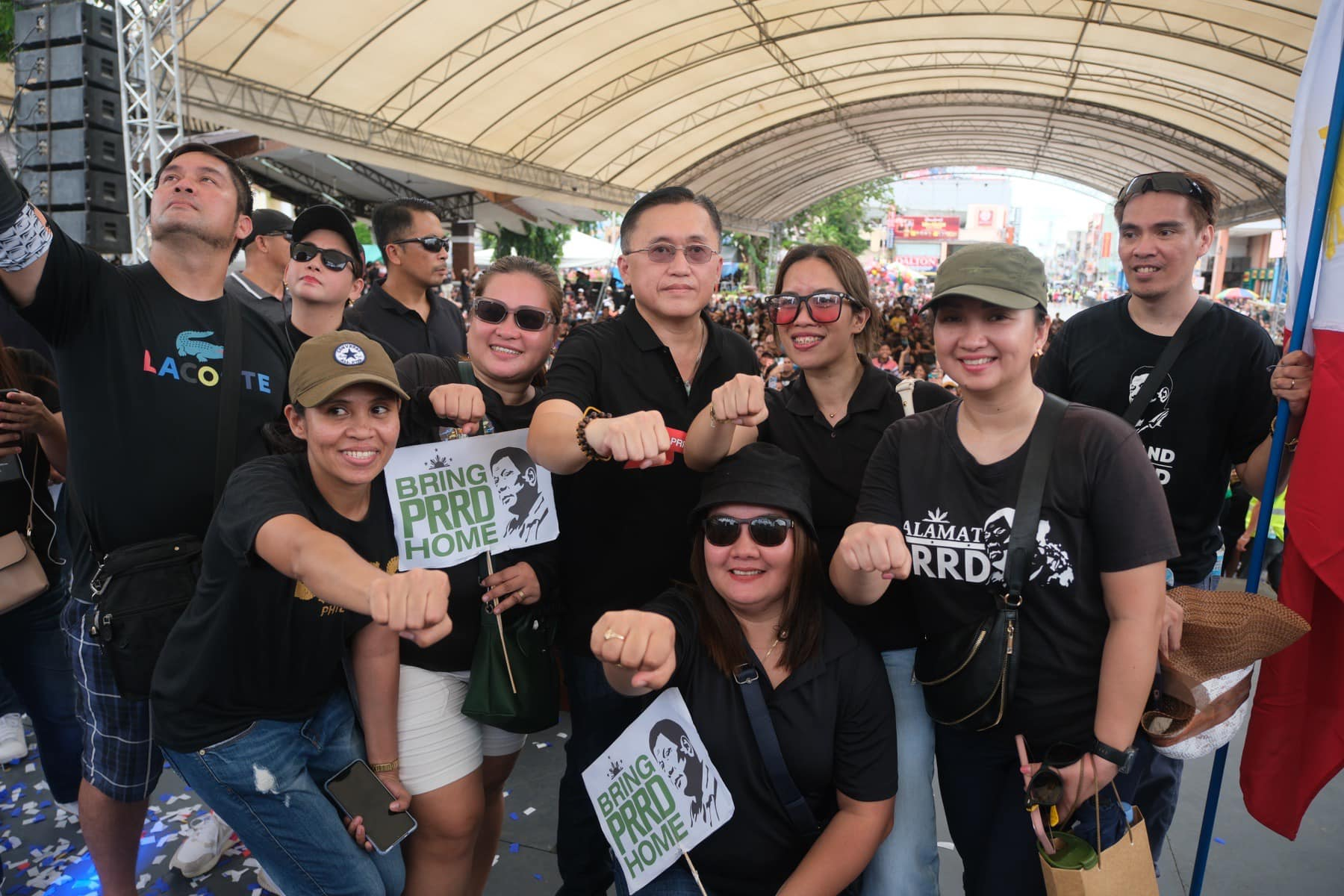
Senator Bong Go with Duterte's supporters protesting Duterte's arrest under an International Criminal Court arrest warrant

== See also ==
- Finger gun § Brazil
- Faz o L
- Laban sign
