= Nelson J. Celis =

Filipino lawyer, COMELEC Commissioner

Nelson Java Celis
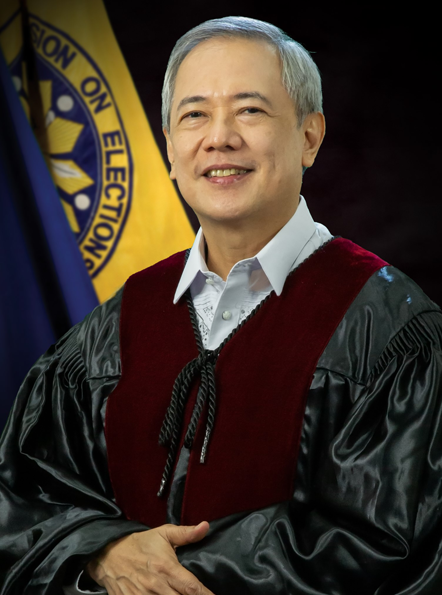
- Official portrait, 2023

Commissioner of the Commission on Elections
- Incumbent
- Assumed office August 15, 2022
- Appointed by: Bongbong Marcos
- Preceded by: Aimee Torrefranca-Neri

Personal details
- Born: Nelson Celis
- Education: Don Bosco Technical College
- Occupation: Election official, engineer, columnist
- Profession: Electronics and communications engineer
- Known for: Advocacy for clean and automated elections

Nelson Java Celis is a Filipino engineer, columnist, and election official serving as a commissioner of the Commission on Elections of the Philippines since 2022. He is known for his advocacy of clean and honest elections and his involvement in the development of the country’s automated election system.

== Early life and education ==
Celis earned his degree in electronics and communications engineering from Don Bosco Technical College.

== Career ==
=== Involvement with the Commission on Elections ===
From 2006 to 2008, Celis served as lead consultant to then-Comelec commissioner Resurreccion Borra, providing inputs on the implementation of the poll body’s automated election system (AES) project. He also made recommendations to the Comelec Advisory Council on the conduct of automated polls.

He is a former lead consultant of ex-Comelec chairman Resurreccion Borra until 2008.

From 2009 to 2010, Celis was co-convener of AES Watch, an election watchdog advocating for clean and honest automated elections. Since 2011, he has served as the group’s spokesperson.

On August 15, 2022, President Bongbong Marcos appointed Celis to the Commission on Elections to fill one of two remaining vacancies. His term is set to expire in February 2029.

=== Journalism and public commentary ===
Celis writes the column Let’s Face It for The Manila Times, where he discusses election technology and policy. He has written in favor of exploring a hybrid election system as an alternative to the existing AES.

=== Private sector ===
Celis has held senior positions in the private sector, including chief information officer of Megalink and the Philippine Veterans Bank, general manager of a technology company, and managing director of his own cybersecurity firm. He is a founding director of the National Association of Data Protection Officers of the Philippines.

=== Academia ===
Celis has lectured at De La Salle University and was formerly the dean of the business school at the Pamantasan ng Lungsod ng Maynila.
