= Faz o L =

Informal slogan of Lula da Silva's 2022 presidential campaign

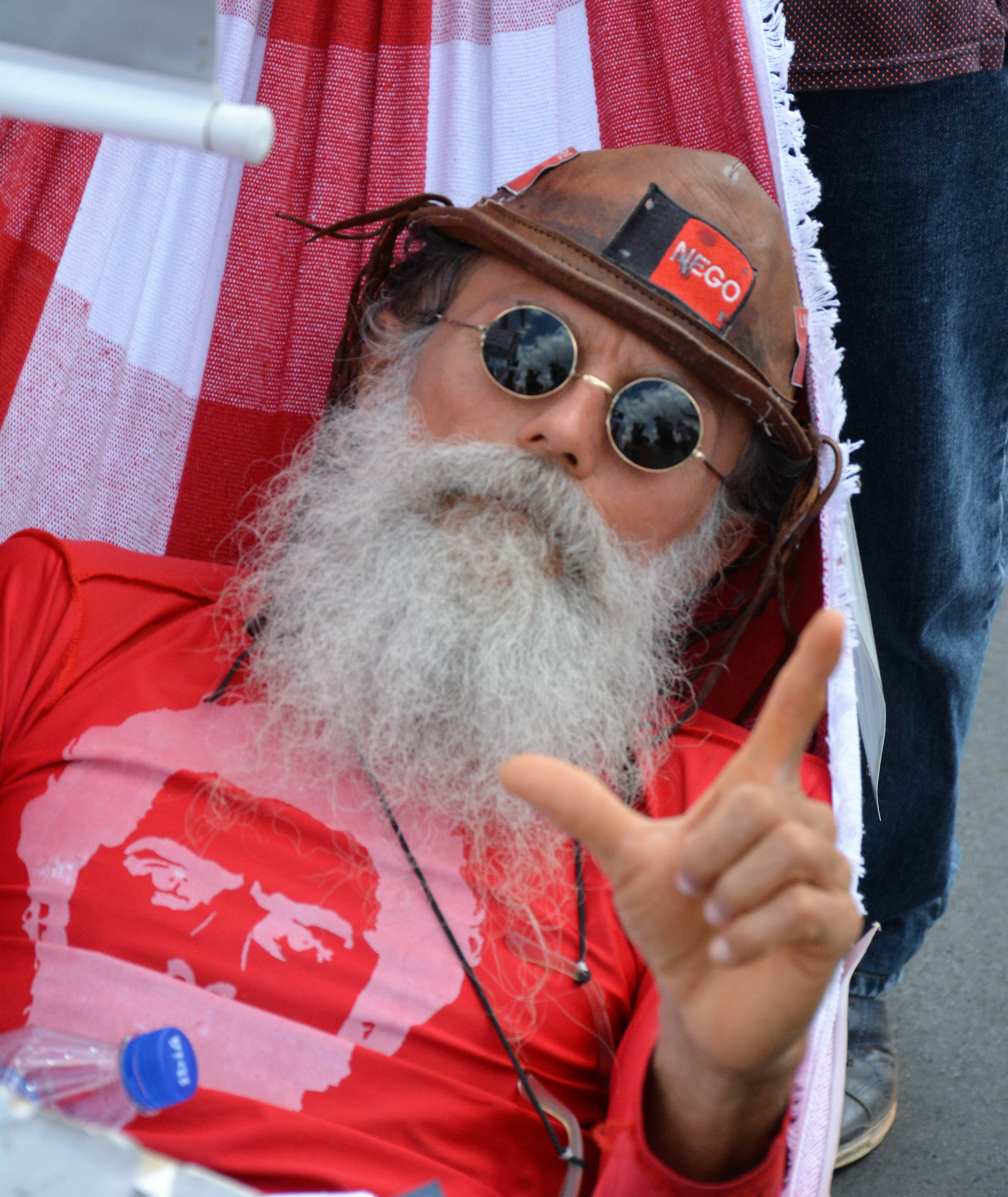
Sympathizer of the Workers' Party doing the L gesture in 2018

"Faz o L" (Portuguese pronunciation: [ˈfa(j)z u ˈɛli], literally "do the L") is an informal mobilization slogan, and a reference to the hand gesture that was the hallmark of President Luiz Inácio Lula da Silva's 2022 campaign. It has become a target of dispute between supporters of both Lula and his Workers' Party and of former president Jair Bolsonaro (Lula's main opponent in the 2022 election) on social media. On one side, Lula's supporters have been using the phrase to praise his management and mark contrasts with the previous administration; on the other, supporters of former president Bolsonaro have adopted the term ironically to criticize measures announced by the new government.

According to David Nemer, a professor of media studies at the University of Virginia in the U.S. and an expert on Bolsonaro's WhatsApp groups, the slogan works as a meme, a way of bringing together various meanings. It has a sense of validation of the vote for both Lula's supporters and the other side, tends to reinforce bubbles, and is a way of keeping mobilization. By functioning as a meme, it facilitates digital communication.

It has been reported that, after Lula's election, it has been the opposition to the president, mainly Bolsonarists, who had adopted the expression the most. Notwithstanding, as of November 2026, the gesture was adopted by several left-wing parties worldwide, as a symbol of resistance against the far-right ascension.

== Use of the slogan ==
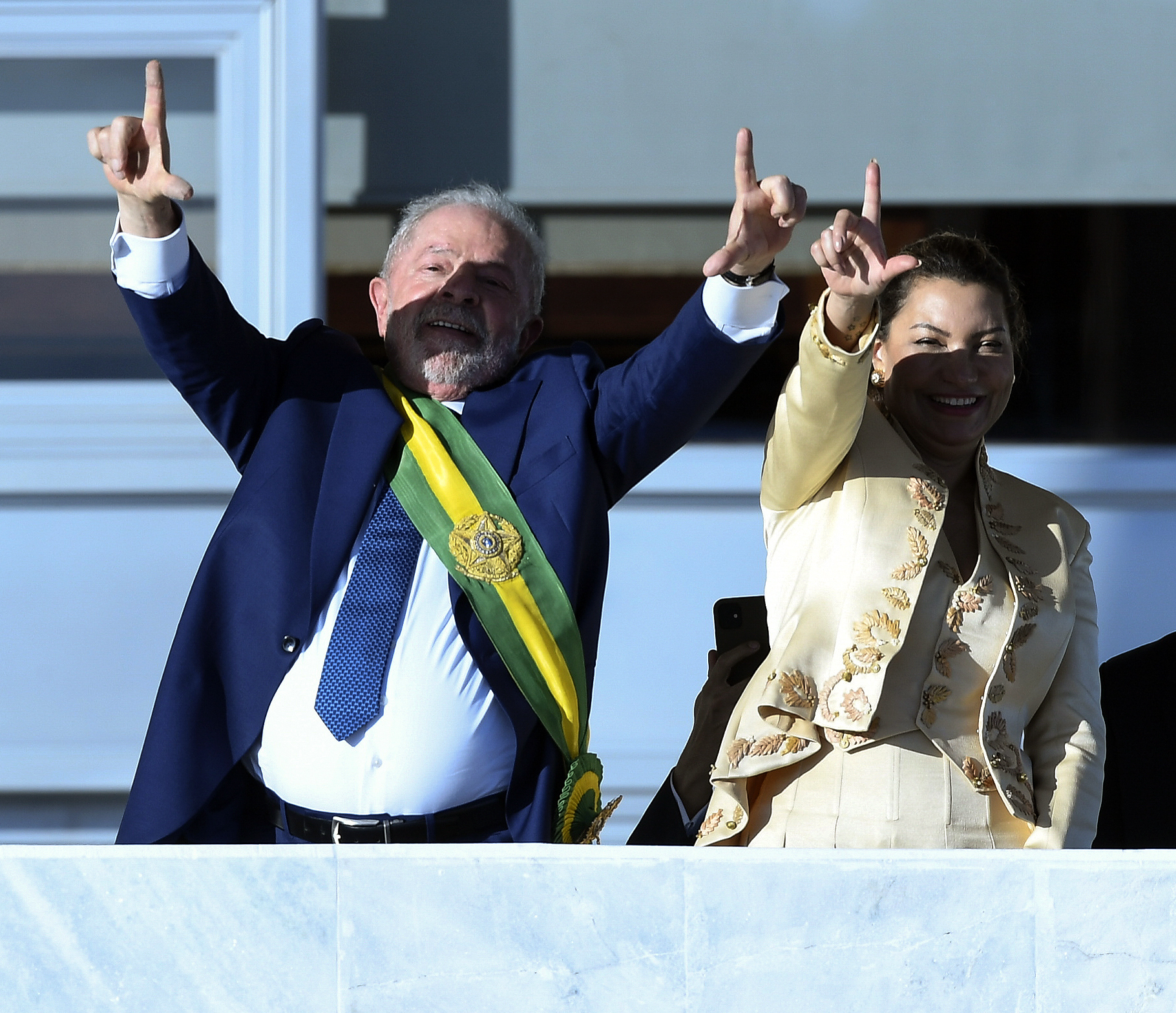
Lula and Janja doing the L on January 1, 2023

=== By supporters of Lula government ===
Supporters of the Workers' Party (PT) candidate use the phrase to praise his administration and highlight contrasts with the previous administration. They also started using the phrase to react to the ironies from the Bolsonarist camp.

Letícia Lourenço, a digital influencer who supports the Brazilian Workers' Party, spoke out after her house was shot five times in the Canaã neighborhood of Ipatinga, Minas Gerais. "I have seen comments from totally unnecessary people saying 'now do the L'. I will continue to do the L, because whoever did this to me did not do the L", she said.

=== By non-supporters of Lula government ===
The slogan "faz o L" used during the successful electoral campaign of Lula's Workers' Party in 2022 has been appropriated by disinformation campaigns falsely attributing actions of previous governments to Lula's second presidency. These campaigns use neologisms like fazueli, fazuele, fazoele, and fazoeli, and focus on issues such as new taxes, reduction of social benefits, and changes in labor laws.

For instance, an image that became viral in March 2023 of a gas station banner claiming that the rising fuel prices are due to taxes from Lula government and asking those who did the L to complain to the Workers' Party is false. The image, which was digitally altered, was actually from 2015 and originally stated that customers should complain to Dilma about the price increase. The photo was taken at a gas station in Ponta Grossa, Paraná, and the fact was caused by tax increases announced by the then Minister of Finance, Joaquim Levy. The goal of the post, shared by Eduardo Bolsonaro and others, was to blame PT for the fuel price increase due to recent government tax changes. This content had broad reach on social media. On Twitter, one post showing the image had 556,000 views, 28.9 thousand likes, and 4.7 thousand retweets.

On March 18, 2023, the Workers' Party presented a criminal complaint against the mayor of Divinópolis, Gleidson Azevedo (PSC), after the municipal executive linked President Luiz Inácio Lula da Silva to a supposed increase in homicides in the city. In an interview with the Gatilho Podcast on March 9, Azevedo was asked about an increase in crime rates in Divinópolis, and replied "Faz o L." The criminal complaint lists three crimes allegedly committed by Azevedo in his statement—slander, insult, and dereliction of duty in relation to combating crime in the municipality.

In contrast to its use by opponents of Lula da Silva's government, other politicians have cited the phrase against a third camp. One example is João Amoêdo, a Brazilian businessman and founder of the libertarian right-wing political party Novo, who caused a stir when he publicly declared his support for then-candidate Luiz Inácio Lula da Silva. In 2022, after the presidential election, he stated with a smile on his face, "They ask me to do the L, but I am not going to do the L. I wanted to remove the B [for Bolsonaro], and the mission was accomplished."

A false arrest warrant against Superior Electoral Court president and Supreme Federal Court justice Alexandre de Moraes inserted into the Brazilian national prison database in January 2023, instead of ending with publique-se e intime-se ("be published and be notified") as is customary, contained the mocking phrase publique-se, intime-se e faz o L ("be published, be notified, and do the L"). Hacker Walter Delgatti Neto was arrested and charged with creating the false arrest warrant; he claims the idea came from Deputy Carla Zambelli.

=== Worldwide ===
Following Lula's victory on the runoff of the 2026 Brazilian presidential general election, a direct consequence of the popular movement that arose after losing against senator Flávio Bolsonaro in the first round, the "do the L" gesture was considered by several political leaders as an symbol of resistance against far-right ascension worldwide. Left-wing leaders, such as Spanish prime minister Pedro Sánchez, Barcelona mayor Ada Colau, and Mexican president Claudia Sheinbaum did the gesture in antifascist protests and speeches, while encouraging a similar movement to that that occurred in Brazil in their countries.

== See also ==
- Finger gun § Brazil
- Laban sign, a Filipino political hand gesture similar to Faz o L
- Loser (hand gesture)
- Duterte fist
