= Marlon S. Casquejo =

The Honorable Marlon Casquejo

Commissioner of the Commission on Elections
- In office June 19, 2019 – February 3, 2025
- Appointed by: Rodrigo Duterte
- President: Rodrigo Duterte
- Preceded by: Hon. Christian Lim
- Succeeded by: Hon. Noli R. Pipo

Personal details
- Born: Marlon Sabucido Casquejo Davao City, Philippines
- Education: University of San Carlos (B.S. Computer Engineering); Ateneo de Davao University (LLB)
- Occupation: Lawyer
- Profession: Government official

Marlon Sabucido Casquejo is a Filipino lawyer and government official who served as a commissioner of the Commission on Elections (COMELEC) from 2018 until 2025.

== Early life and education ==
Casquejo hails from Davao City, Philippines. He earned his bachelor's degree in Computer Engineering from the University of San Carlos in Cebu City, and completed his law degree at Ateneo de Davao University in 2000.

== Career ==
Prior to becoming commissioner, Casquejo held various positions within the COMELEC, including Assistant Regional Election Director for Region XI (Davao Region), Provincial Election Supervisor for Davao del Norte, and City Election Officer for the 3rd district of Davao City.

He was appointed as COMELEC commissioner by President Rodrigo Duterte in 2018, serving until his retirement on February 3, 2025. During his tenure, he headed the commission's Second Division.
