= Ribomapil Holganza Sr. =

Philippine politician (1935-2015)

- Born: Ribomapil Estrelloso Holganza; April 26, 1935; Dumanjug, Cebu, Philippine Islands
- Died: January 25, 2015 (aged 79); Cebu City, Philippines
- Education: University of San Carlos (LL.B.)
- Political party: PDP-Laban
- Spouse: Rosie Sanchez
- Children: 6

Ribomapil Estrelloso Holganza, Sr. (April 26, 1935 – January 25, 2015), widely known as Dodong Holganza, was a Filipino activist and politician who served as a leader of the opposition against the 10th President of the Philippines Ferdinand Marcos on his native province of Cebu.

As a founding member of the political party PDP–Laban, Holganza was involved with several opposition groups in the Visayas and Mindanao that helped gather support for the overthrow of President Marcos during the EDSA People Power Revolution in 1986.

== Political career ==
Ribomapil E. Holganza was born in Dumanjug, Cebu, and studied law at the University of San Carlos. After graduating from law school, Holganza entered politics, where he served as city administrator of Cebu City and as secretary to Sergio Osmeña Jr. By the early 1970s, Holganza, along with several other activists in Cebu, organized what was then an unpopular opposition coalition against the ruling administration of President Ferdinand Marcos in his hometown.

In 1982, Holganza, together with political activists from the Visayas and Mindanao, including Aquilino Pimentel Jr. and Antonio Cuenco, founded the primary opposition party PDP–Laban (then known merely as Partido Demokratiko Pilipino before its eventual merger with LABAN) and served as its first Secretary-General. PDP-Laban would go on to elect the next president of the Philippines after the 1986 Philippine presidential election with its standard bearer Corazon Aquino.

== Christmas Day Detainees ==
On December 25, 1982, while serving as secretary-general of PDP-Laban, Holganza and his son were arrested by pro-Marcos forces during a raid in Cebu City and were subsequently incarcerated on charges of rebellion until his release in 1985. During the period of their incarceration, Holganza and his son earned the nickname "Christmas Day Detainees" from the press.

The arrest of Holganza, as well as the assassination of Ninoy Aquino in 1983, helped galvanize support for the opposition groups in Cebu which, along with other events simultaneously occurring throughout the country, eventually led to the broader People Power Revolution in 1986, and the subsequent assumption of Corazon Aquino of the presidency.

== Later life and death ==
After the People Power Revolution, Holganza left politics and retired in Bantayan Island, Cebu, with his family. Holganza died suddenly after a stroke on January 25, 2015, at the age of 79.

His death was mourned by many of Cebu's local politicians. Edgardo Labella, who later served as mayor of Cebu City said, "Dodong will always be remembered as one of those who vigorously fought against the dictatorship while many others who claimed to be liberators sought refuge and enjoyed comfort in the land of milk and honey, so to speak. I fervently hope students of Philippine History will always remember his name alongside the likes of Inday Nita [Daluz] and Sen. José W. Diokno." Antonio Cuenco, Holganza's former colleague in PDP-Laban said, "May his bravery in the fight to restore democracy in the country serve as an inspiration to the young people."

Holganza was married to Rosie Sanchez-Holganza, who came from a Mestizo landowning family in northern Cebu. He has six children with his wife Rosie, including Ribomapil Holganza, Jr. who was a member of the Provincial Board of the Province of Cebu and a former president of the Federation of the Association of Barangay Councils, Rico Rey Holganza, a lawyer and former district collector for the Bureau of Customs in Cebu, Rosemarie Holganza-Borromeo, a journalist and former news chief of ABS-CBN, Dr. Rori Holganza-Mercado, Dr. Rhona Holganza-De Paul, and Ruby Holganza-Ortiz, a barangay captain in Bantayan, Cebu.

== Legacy ==
In 2010, Holganza was honored by the Weslaco, Texas, city council, which declared September 30 as Ribomapil Holganza Day in recognition of his role in restoring freedom and democracy in the Philippines.
