= Commission on Elections (Philippines) =

Philippine independent constitutional commission

Commission on Elections Komisyon sa Halalan
- Official seal

- Palacio del Gobernador, head office
- Abbreviation: COMELEC
- Predecessor: Department of Interior
- Formation: August 22, 1940; 86 years ago
- Headquarters: Palacio del Gobernador
- Location: General Luna Street corner Andres Soriano Jr. Avenue, Intramuros, Manila
- Members: 1 chairperson, 6 commissioners
- Chairperson: George Erwin M. Garcia
- Budget: ₱14.6 billion (2021)
- Employees: 4,836 (2024)
- Website: www.comelec.gov.ph

The Commission on Elections (Filipino: Komisyon sa Halalan), abbreviated as COMELEC, is one of the three constitutional commissions of the Philippines. Its principal role is to enforce all laws and regulations relative to the conduct of elections in the Philippines.

The other two Constitutional Commissions are the Commission on Audit and Civil Service Commission.

== Functions ==
According to Article IX-C, Section 2 of the 1987 Constitution of the Philippines, the Commission on Elections (COMELEC) shall exercise the following powers and functions:

1. Enforce and administer all laws and regulations relative to the conduct of an election, plebiscite, initiative, referendum, and recall.
2. Exercise exclusive original jurisdiction over all contests relating to the elections, returns, and qualifications of all elective regional, provincial, and city officials, and appellate jurisdiction over all contests involving elective municipal officials decided by trial courts of general jurisdiction, or involving elective barangay officials decided by trial courts of limited jurisdiction. Decisions, final orders, or rulings of the commission on election contests involving elective municipal and barangay offices shall be final, executory, and not appealable.
3. Decide, except those involving the right to vote, all questions affecting elections, including determination of the number and location of polling places, appointment of election officials and inspectors, and registration of voters.
4. Deputize, with the concurrence of the President, law enforcement agencies and instrumentalities of the Government, including the Armed Forces of the Philippines, for the exclusive purpose of ensuring free, orderly, honest, peaceful, and credible elections.
5. Register, after sufficient publication, political parties, organizations, or coalitions which, in addition to other requirements, must present their platform or program of government; and accredit citizens’ arms of the Commission on Elections. Religious denominations and sects shall not be registered. Those which seek to achieve their goals through violence or unlawful means, or refuse to uphold and adhere to this Constitution, or which are supported by any foreign government shall likewise be refused registration. Financial contributions from foreign governments and their agencies to political parties, organizations, coalitions, or candidates related to elections constitute interference in national affairs, and, when accepted, shall be an additional ground for the cancellation of their registration with the commission, in addition to other penalties that may be prescribed by law.
6. File, upon a verified complaint, or on its own initiative, petitions in court for inclusion or exclusion of voters; investigate and, where appropriate, prosecute cases of violations of election laws, including acts or omissions constituting election frauds, offenses, and malpractices.
7. Recommend to the Congress effective measures to minimize election spending, including limitation of places where propaganda materials shall be posted, and to prevent and penalize all forms of election frauds, offenses, malpractices, and nuisance candidacies.
8. Recommend to the President the removal of any officer or employee it has deputized, or the imposition of any other disciplinary action, for violation or disregard of, or disobedience to its directive, order, or decision.
9. Submit to the President and the Congress a comprehensive report on the conduct of each election, plebiscite, initiative, referendum, or recall.

== History ==
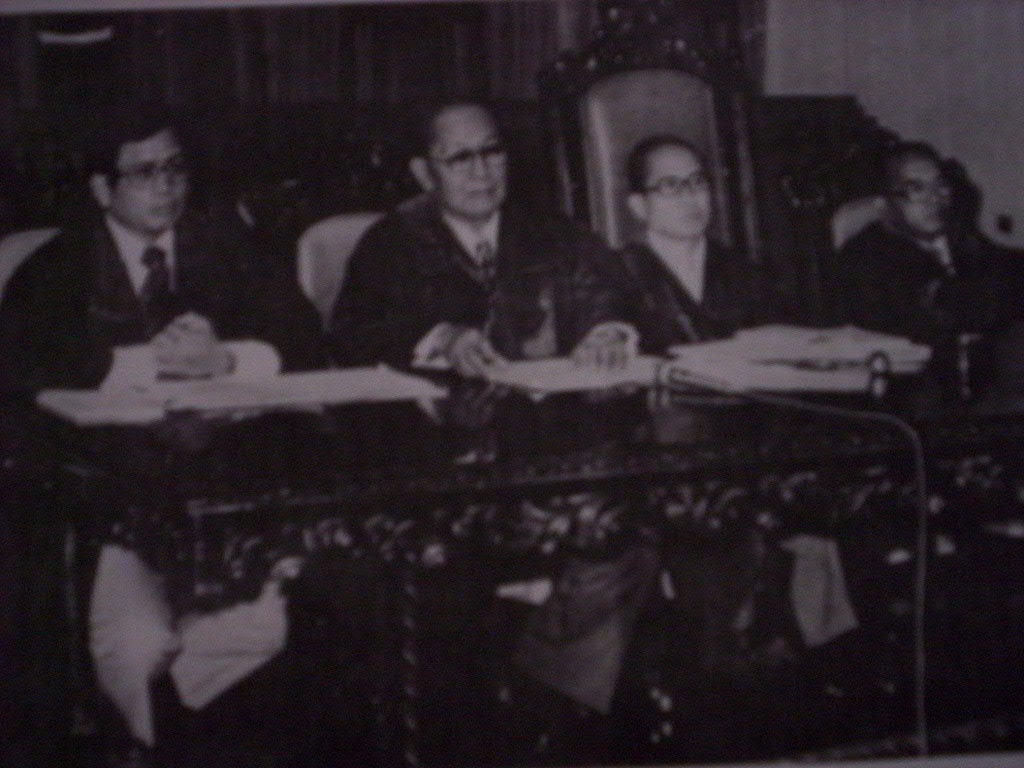
The 1978 Commission was composed of [from left] Commissioners Flores A. Bayot, Venancio Duque, Chairman Leonardo B. Perez, Commissioners Domingo Pabalete and Vicente Santiago (not in the photo).

=== Predecessor ===
==== The Executive Bureau ====
The COMELEC was created by a 1940 amendment to the 1935 Constitution of the Philippines. Prior to the creation of the COMELEC, supervision over the conduct of elections was vested by law in the Executive Bureau under the Department of Interior and, later directly by the same department. The secretary of interior saw to it that local authorities performed the ministerial duties assigned to them by the Election Code. He decided administrative questions concerning elections. The courts, however, exercised exclusive and final jurisdiction over questions affecting the right to vote as well as contested elections of local elective officials. Elections contests involving members of the National Assembly were judged solely by an electoral commission composed of three justices of the Supreme Court and six members of the National Assembly.

=== A statutory commission ===
In view, however, of the close official ties between the president and the secretary of interior, there was always the danger of a partisan secretary of the interior exploiting his powers and influence to ensure the victory of his party at the polls. As a consequence, the constitution was amended in 1940 to create an independent Commission on Elections, composed of a chairman and two other members, to take over the functions of the secretary of the interior relative to elections. But since the amendments could not be effective in time for the 1940 elections, the National Assembly, by Commonwealth Act No. 607, created a Commission on Elections, giving thereto the same powers which the Commission on Elections could have under the amended constitution. The statutory commission supervised the conduct of the December 10, 1940, local Philippine elections.

=== Creation of the Commission ===
The constitutional amendment creating the Commission on Elections was finally approved on December 2, 1940. On June 21, 1941, Commonwealth Act No. 657 was enacted reorganizing the Commission on Elections as a constitutional entity. The members of the statutory commission continued as members of the constitutional commission.

The chairman and members of the commission had a fixed term of nine years each – a member being replaced every three years except in the first commission. They could be removed from office only by impeachment. They were provided with fixed salaries which could neither be increased nor diminished during their term of office. These were safeguards to ensure the independence of the commission.

The administrative control of elections exercised by the secretary of interior was transferred to the Commission on Elections. The commission was vested with the exclusive charge of enforcing and administering all laws relative to elections and the power to decide all questions affecting elections, except those involving the right to vote, which were left to final judicial determination. The courts and electoral tribunals retained their original powers over election contests.

=== Membership expansion ===
The 1973 Constitution enlarged the membership of the commission from three to nine members but reduced their terms of office from nine years to seven years. As in the 1935 Constitution, the chairman and commissioners had staggered terms of office and could be removed from office only by impeachment.

First to serve in the Commission on Elections under the 1973 Constitution were former Senator Leonardo B. Perez, as chairman, and Venacio S. Duque, Flores A. Bayot, Jose M. Mendoza, Fernando R. Veloso, Lininding Pangandaman, Venancio L. Yaneza and Casimiro R. Madarang Jr. as commissioners. Commissioner Pangandaman, the first Muslim commissioner of the COMELEC, was appointed ambassador by President Ferdinand Marcos even before the expiration of his term. His unexpired term was taken over by Commissioner Hashim R. Abubakar.

On May 17, 1980, Chairman Perez (who was later appointed minister of political affairs by President Marcos) and Commissioners Duque and Bayot, after completing their seven-year term, retired. Commissioner Santiago succeeded Perez, and the following were appointed commissioners: Domingo C. Pabalete; Victorino A. Savellano; Jaime C. Opinion; Noli Sagadraca; Romeo Firme: Luis Lardizabal and Ide C. Tillah. With Commissioner Lardizabal the membership of the commission was thus increased to eight, one short of the full complement of nine.

Upon the retirement of Commissioners Firme, Tillah and Lardizabal on May 17, 1983, the Commission on Elections was composed of only five members. On March 21, 1983, two new members were appointed by President Marcos, namely: Froilan Bacungan and Ramon H. Felipe Jr. With the retirement of Chairman Santiago and Commissioners Pabalete and Sagadraca on May 17, 1984, Savellano was appointed chairman. Three new members were appointed on July 27, 1985, namely: Commissioners Quirino A. Marquinez, Mangontawar Guro and Mario D. Ortiz. On January 31, 1986, Commissioners Ruben C. Agpalo and Jaime Layosa were appointed to finally complete the required membership of nine.

=== After the 1986 EDSA People Power Revolution ===
After the tumultuous February 7, 1986 snap elections and the People Power Revolution, Chairman Savellano and all the commissioners of the COMELEC tendered their courtesy resignations which, except those of Commissioners Bacungan and Felipe, were accepted by President Corazon C. Aquino.

On April 11, 1986, Commissioner Felipe was appointed acting chairman. On July 23, 1986, he took his oath of office as permanent chairman, together with Commissioners Leopoldo Africa, Haydee Yorac, Andres Flores, Anacleto Badoy, and Dario Rama as members of the "new" Commission on Elections. On February 15, 1988, Hilario G. Davide Jr. was appointed chairman, with Alfredo E. Abueg Jr., Haydee B. Yorac, Leopoldo L. Africa, Andres R. Flores, Dario C. Rama and Magdara B. Dimaampao as commissioners. Commissioner Haydee B. Yorac was appointed as acting chairman when Hilario G. Davide Jr. was appointed chairman of the Presidential Fact Finding Commission in December 1989, pursuant to Administrative Order No. 146. On June 6, 1991 Christian Monsod was appointed by President Aquino as chairman of the commission to serve the unexpired term of Davide.

When Monsod retired on February 15, 1995, President Fidel V. Ramos appointed Court of Appeals Justice Bernardo Pardo as chairman of the commission. Pardo's term was cut short when he was appointed by President Joseph Estrada as associate justice of the Supreme Court in October 1998. Commissioner Luzviminda Tancangco was appointed acting chairman of the commission.

On January 11, 1999, President Estrada appointed Sandiganbayan Justice Harriet Demetriou as chairman of the commission. After the events of January 17 to 20, 2001 that led to the ouster and resignation of President Estrada from power, Demetriou tendered her courtesy resignation which was accepted by President Gloria Macapagal Arroyo.

On February 19, 2001, President Arroyo appointed Justice Alfredo Benipayo as chairman of the commission. However, the Commission on Appointments did not confirm his appointment due to opposition of some commissioners led by Luzviminda Tancangco. On June 5, 2002, President Arroyo appointed Metropolitan Manila Development Authority chairman and former Mandaluyong mayor Benjamin S. Abalos Sr. to replace Benipayo. On January 26, 2008, Gloria Macapagal Arroyo appointed former Supreme Court associate justice Jose Melo, 77, to replace Chair Abalos. The United Opposition (UNO) opposed Melo's appointment. However, Melo needed to be confirmed by the Commission on Appointments (CA), so Commissioner Romeo A. Brawner was appointed ad interim acting chairman on February 2, 2008, and stayed as chairman until Melo was confirmed by the CA. On March 25, 2008, former Supreme Court justice Jose Melo was sworn in as new chairman of the COMELEC by acting chair Romeo A. Brawner. Melo's ad interim appointment (Congress was not in session) was sent by Malacañang to the Commission on Appointments.

On May 29, 2008, Romeo A. Brawner died from a massive heart attack. Brawner, appointed to the COMELEC to replace the controversial Virgilio Garcillano, was supposed to end his term on February 2, 2011. Gloria Macapagal Arroyo, on July 2, 2008, appointed former acting judge (Br. 74, RTC, Malabon) Leonardo Leonida and retired justice of the Court of Appeals Lucenito Tagle as commissioners of the Commission on Elections. On November 7, 2008, President Gloria Macapagal Arroyo appointed Armando Velasco as new election commissioner, and reappointed bypassed commissioners Leonardo L. Leonida and Lucenito N. Tagle. Eduardo Ermita stated "Velasco replaced COMELEC commissioner and former Iligan City Judge Moslemen Macarambon Jr. whose appointment had been bypassed several times by the Commission on Appointments (CA)."

=== 2007 impeachment complaint ===
On September 27, 2007, Iloilo Vice Governor Rolex Suplico filed a 69-page impeachment complaint (3:00 p.m.) against COMELEC chairman Benjamin Abalos Sr. before the House of Representatives of the Philippines regarding the ZTE national broadband network (NBN) deal. It was endorsed by Representatives Teofisto Guingona III of Bukidnon and Teodoro Casiño of Bayan Muna (People First), and Zamboanga City Representative Ma. Isabelle Climaco. Affidavits of Romulo Neri and Jose de Venecia III supported the complaint. On October 1, 2007, COMELEC chairman Benjamin Abalos Sr. faced with an impending impeachment case, resigned in a press conference. The COMELEC appointed Resurreccion Z. Borra as acting chairman. Abalos stated: "I'm resigning... effective immediately." "However," Abalos added during the news conference, "let not my detractors feast on this declaration. I'm not admitting guilt for any wrongdoing." An impeachment complaint against COMELEC chairman Abalos was formally filed before the House of Representatives after Neri, former chief of the National Economic Development Authority (NEDA), accused Abalos of attempting to bribe him.

== Organization ==
COMELEC Hymn
Anthem of the Commission on Elections. Written and composed by Rolando G. de Castro and Oliver M. Astadan in 1988.

The commission proper is the policy-making body composed of the chairman and six commissioners who must be natural-born citizens of the Philippines; at least thirty-five years of age at the time of their appointment; holders of a college degree, with a majority of them, including the chairman, members of the Philippine Bar who have been engaged in the practice of law for at least ten years; and must not have been a candidate for any elective position in the immediate preceding elections. The chairman and the commissioners are appointed by the president, with the consent of the Commission on Appointments and hold office for seven years, without reappointment. Since 1987, the terms start and end on February 2. Among the first appointees in 1987, three members served for seven years (ended in 1994), two others served for five years (ended in 1992), and two others served for three years (ended in 1989).

The chairman acts as the presiding officer and chief executive officer of the commission. Assisting the commission are an executive director and deputies, 17 regional election directors, provincial election supervisors and election officers in cities and municipalities. The COMELEC has more than 15,000 employees.

The commissioners exercise quasi-legislative and quasi-judicial functions either en banc or in division. They also perform such other functions as may be assigned by the commission or the chairman.

=== Current composition ===
Current composition
Position	Division	Picture	Name	Tenure started	Tenure scheduled to end	Appointed by
Chairman			George Garcia	July 22, 2022	February 2, 2029	Bongbong Marcos
Commissioner	2nd		Nelson J. Celis	August 11, 2022	February 2, 2029	Bongbong Marcos
Commissioner	1st		Ernesto Ferdinand P. Maceda Jr.	October 6, 2022	February 2, 2029	Bongbong Marcos
Commissioner	1st		Aimee Ferolino-Ampoloquio	November 24, 2020	February 2, 2027	Rodrigo Duterte
Commissioner	2nd		Rey E. Bulay	November 11, 2021	February 2, 2027	Rodrigo Duterte
Commissioner	1st		Norina Tangaro-Casingal	February 10, 2025	February 2, 2032	Bongbong Marcos
Commissioner	2nd		Noli Pipo	February 10, 2025	February 2, 2032	Bongbong Marcos

=== Former members ===
During the 1935 constitution, the commission was composed of three members, with one chairman and two commissioners, each having nine-year terms with no reappointments. Among the first three members appointed, the first had a nine-year term, the second had a six-year term, and the last had a three-year term, all starting in the commission's reorganization on June 21, 1941, via Commonwealth Act No. 657.

Starting with the 1973 constitution, the commission was composed of nine members, with one chairman and eight commissioners, each having seven-year terms with no reappointments. Among the first nine members appointed, the first three had seven-year terms, the next three had five-year terms, and the last three had three-year terms, all starting in 1973. The commission never reached its full complement of nine members during the operation of the 1973 constitution until January 1986, a few weeks before the People Power Revolution.

Image	Chairman	Term began	Term ended	Appointed by	Electoral exercises oversaw
	Pedro Concepcion	September 1, 1940	May 11, 1941	Manuel L. Quezon	none
	Jose López Vito	May 13, 1941	May 7, 1947	Manuel L. Quezon	1941 election, 1946 election, 1947 plebiscite
	Vicente de Vera	May 9, 1947	April 10, 1951 (Note: Died in office)	Manuel Roxas	1949 election
	Domingo Imperial	August 14, 1951	March 31, 1958 (Note: Resigned mid-term, or was rejected by the Commission on Appointments)	Elpidio Quirino	1953 election, 1957 election
	Jose Carag	May 19, 1958	June 20, 1959	Carlos P. Garcia	none
	Sixto Brillantes Sr.	June 20, 1959	May 12, 1960	Carlos P. Garcia	none
	Gaudencio Garcia	May 12, 1960	June 20, 1962	Carlos P. Garcia	1961 election
	Juan Borra	August 2, 1962	June 20, 1968	Diosdado Macapagal	1965 election
	Manuel Arranz	October 18, 1968	June 2, 1969	Ferdinand Marcos	1967 plebiscite
	Jaime Ferrer	June 10, 1969	May 28, 1973	Ferdinand Marcos	1969 election, 1970 constitutional convention election, January 1973 plebiscite
	Leonardo Perez	May 29, 1973	May 17, 1980	Ferdinand Marcos	July 1973 referendum, 1975 referendum, 1976 referendum, 1977 referendum, 1978 election
	Vicente Santiago Jr.	May 17, 1980	May 17, 1985	Ferdinand Marcos	1981 plebiscite, 1981 election and referendum, 1984 plebiscite, 1984 election
	Victorino Savellano	May 20, 1985	March 24, 1986	Ferdinand Marcos	1986 election
	Ramon Felipe Jr.	July 11, 1986	February 3, 1988	Corazon Aquino	1987 plebiscite, 1987 election
	Hilario Davide Jr.	February 15, 1988	January 12, 1990	Corazon Aquino	1988 local elections
	Christian Monsod	June 6, 1991	February 15, 1995	Corazon Aquino	1992 election
	Bernardo P. Pardo	February 17, 1995	October 7, 1998	Fidel V. Ramos	1995 election, 1998 election
	Harriet Demetriou	January 11, 1999	January 21, 2001	Joseph Estrada	none
	Alfredo Benipayo	February 15, 2001	June 5, 2002	Gloria Macapagal Arroyo	2001 election
	Benjamin Abalos	June 17, 2002	October 1, 2007	Gloria Macapagal Arroyo	2004 election, 2007 election
	Jose Melo	March 25, 2008	January 15, 2011	Gloria Macapagal Arroyo	2010 election
	Sixto Brillantes Jr.	January 17, 2011	February 2, 2015	Benigno Aquino III	2013 election
	Andres Bautista	April 28, 2015	October 23, 2017	Benigno Aquino III	2016 election
	Sheriff Abas	May 23, 2018	February 2, 2022	Rodrigo Duterte	2019 election
	Saidamen Pangarungan	March 8, 2022	June 1, 2022 (Note: Resigned mid-term, bypassed or was rejected by the Commission on Appointments)	Rodrigo Duterte	2022 election

Image	Commissioner	Term began	Term ended	Appointed by
	Jose C. Abreu	September 1, 1940	October 11, 1944	Manuel L. Quezon
	Rufino Luna	September 1, 1940	July 12, 1945	Manuel L. Quezon
	Francisco Enage	July 12, 1945	November 9, 1949	Sergio Osmeña
	Vicente de Vera	July 12, 1945	April 8, 1951	Sergio Osmeña
	Leopoldo Rovira	May 22, 1947	September 10, 1954	Manuel Roxas
	Rodrigo Perez Jr.	December 8, 1949	June 21, 1956	Manuel Roxas
	Gaudencio Garcia	May 18, 1955	June 20, 1962 (Note: Subsequently appointed as chairman)	Ramon Magsaysay
	Sixto Brillantes Sr.	December 20, 1956	June 20, 1965	Ramon Magsaysay
	Genaro Visarra	May 12, 1960	November 10, 1962	Carlos P. Garcia
	Cesar Miraflor	November 11, 1962	June 20, 1971	Diosdado Macapagal
	Gregorio Santayana	June 26, 1965	May 31, 1966	Diosdado Macapagal
	Francisco Ortega	December 25, 1966	March 20, 1967	Ferdinand Marcos
	Manuel Arranz	August 27, 1967	June 2, 1969	Ferdinand Marcos
	Jaime N. Ferrer	May 23, 1969	May 28, 1973	Ferdinand Marcos
	Lino M. Patajo	June 16, 1969	May 31, 1973	Ferdinand Marcos
	Jose M. Mendoza	September 6, 1971	May 17, 1973	Ferdinand Marcos
	Lininding Pangandaman	May 29, 1973	November 15, 1973	Ferdinand Marcos
	Flores A. Bayot	May 30, 1973	May 17, 1980	Ferdinand Marcos
	Venancio R. Yaneza	May 30, 1973	May 17, 1980	Ferdinand Marcos
	Casimiro R. Madarang Jr.	May 30, 1973	May 17, 1980	Ferdinand Marcos
	Fernando R. Veloso	May 30, 1973	May 17, 1980	Ferdinand Marcos
	Venancio S. Duque	June 1, 1973	May 17, 1980	Ferdinand Marcos
	Domingo C. Pabalate	May 17, 1978	May 17, 1985	Ferdinand Marcos
	Vicente M. Santiago Jr.	May 17, 1978	May 17, 1985	Ferdinand Marcos
	Victorino A. Savellano	May 17, 1980	May 17, 1987	Ferdinand Marcos
	Jaime C. Opinion	May 17, 1980	May 17, 1987	Ferdinand Marcos
	Noli M. Sagadraca	May 17, 1980	May 17, 1985	Ferdinand Marcos
	Romeo N. Firme	May 17, 1980	May 17, 1983	Ferdinand Marcos
	Ide C. Tillah	May 17, 1980	May 17, 1983	Ferdinand Marcos
	Luis L. Lardizabal	May 17, 1980	May 17, 1983	Ferdinand Marcos
	Froilan M. Bacungan	March 21, 1984	May 17, 1990	Ferdinand Marcos
	Ramon H. Felipe Jr.	March 21, 1984	May 17, 1990	Ferdinand Marcos
	Mario D. Ortiz	July 30, 1985	July 23, 1986	Ferdinand Marcos
	Mangontawar B. Guro	July 30, 1985	April 11, 1986	Ferdinand Marcos
	Quirino A. Marquinez	August 1, 1985	July 23, 1986	Ferdinand Marcos
	Ruben Agpalo	January 2, 1986	July 23, 1986	Ferdinand Marcos
	Jaime J. Layosa	January 29, 1986	July 23, 1986	Ferdinand Marcos
	Leopoldo L. Africa	June 14, 1986	February 15, 1991	Corazon Aquino
	Haydee Yorac (Note: Concurrently served as acting chairman)	July 15, 1986	February 11, 1993	Corazon Aquino
	Dario C. Rama	July 16, 1986	February 15, 1993	Corazon Aquino
	Anacleto D. Badoy Jr.	July 16, 1986	February 3, 1988	Corazon Aquino
	Andres R. Flores	July 17, 1986	February 15, 1991	Corazon Aquino
	Tomas V. dela Cruz	December 11, 1986	September 3, 1987	Corazon Aquino
	Alfredo Abueg Jr.	December 16, 1987	January 20, 1992	Corazon Aquino
	Magdara B. Dimaampao	February 15, 1988	February 15, 1995	Corazon Aquino
	Froilan M. Bacungan	February 15, 1988	January 12, 1990	Corazon Aquino
	Regalado Maambong	June 6, 1991	February 15, 1998	Corazon Aquino
	Vicente B. de Lima	February 7, 1992	November 4, 1994	Corazon Aquino
	Remedios S. Fernando	February 14, 1992	February 14, 1998	Corazon Aquino
	Graduacion R. Claravall	April 12, 1993	June 14, 1996	Fidel V. Ramos
	Manolo B. Gorospe	April 14, 1993	February 14, 2000	Fidel V. Ramos
	Julio F. Desamito	January 3, 1995	February 15, 2001	Fidel V. Ramos
	Teresita D. Flores	February 17, 1995	February 15, 2001	Fidel V. Ramos
	Japal M. Guiani	March 29, 1996	February 15, 2001	Fidel V. Ramos
	Amado M. Calderon	February 16, 1998	June 30, 1998	Fidel V. Ramos
	Evalyn I. Fetalino	February 16, 1998	June 30, 1998	Fidel V. Ramos
	Luzviminda Tancangco	August 5, 1998	February 2, 2004	Joseph Estrada
	Abdul Gani Marohombsar	September 7, 1998	June 3, 1999	Joseph Estrada
	Ralph C. Lantion	January 6, 2000	February 2, 2004	Joseph Estrada
	Rufino S. Javier	April 4, 2000	February 2, 2006	Joseph Estrada
	Mehol K. Sadain	July 17, 2000	February 2, 2006	Joseph Estrada
	Resurreccion Borra	February 15, 2001	February 2, 2008	Gloria Macapagal Arroyo
	Florentino A. Tuason Jr.	February 20, 2001	February 2, 2008	Gloria Macapagal Arroyo
	Virgilio Garcillano	February 12, 2004	June 10, 2005	Gloria Macapagal Arroyo
	Manuel A. Barcellona Jr.	February 12, 2004	June 10, 2005	Gloria Macapagal Arroyo
	Romeo A. Brawner Sr.	September 18, 2005	May 29, 2008	Gloria Macapagal Arroyo
	Rene V. Sarmiento	April 7, 2006	February 2, 2013	Gloria Macapagal Arroyo
	Nicodemo T. Ferrer	June 15, 2006	February 2, 2011	Gloria Macapagal Arroyo
	Moslemen T. Macarambon	November 5, 2007	October 10, 2008	Gloria Macapagal Arroyo
	Leonardo L. Leonida	July 2, 2008	February 11, 2011	Gloria Macapagal Arroyo
	Lucenito N. Tagle	July 3, 2008	February 2, 2011	Gloria Macapagal Arroyo
	Armando C. Velasco	July 3, 2008	February 2, 2013	Gloria Macapagal Arroyo
	Elias R. Yusoph	July 24, 2009	February 2, 2015	Gloria Macapagal Arroyo
	Gregorio Y. Larrazabal	October 15, 2009	February 2, 2011	Gloria Macapagal Arroyo
	Christian Robert S. Lim	April 7, 2011	February 2, 2018	Benigno Aquino III
	Augusto C. Lagman	June 3, 2011	April 16, 2012	Benigno Aquino III
	Grace Padaca	October 8, 2012	June 11, 2014	Benigno Aquino III
	Luie Tito F. Guia	April 15, 2013	February 2, 2020	Benigno Aquino III
	Al Parreño	April 15, 2013	February 2, 2020	Benigno Aquino III
	Arthur D. Lim	July 25, 2014	February 2, 2018	Benigno Aquino III
	Sheriff M. Abas	April 28, 2015	May 23, 2018	Benigno Aquino III
	Rowena Guanzon	April 28, 2015	February 2, 2022	Benigno Aquino III
	Antonio Kho Jr.	July 11, 2018	February 2, 2022	Rodrigo Duterte
	George Garcia	March 8, 2022	June 1, 2022	Rodrigo Duterte
	Aimee Torrefranca-Neri	March 8, 2022	June 1, 2022	Rodrigo Duterte
	Socorro B. Inting	April 17, 2018	February 2, 2025	Rodrigo Duterte
	Marlon S. Casquejo	June 19, 2018	February 2, 2025	Rodrigo Duterte

== Issues and incidents ==
=== ZTE broadband contract controversy ===
In August 2007, Nueva Vizcaya Rep. Carlos Padilla delivered a privilege speech alleging that Comelec chairman Benjamin Abalos brokered for the national broadband network (NBN) project. Padilla claimed that Abalos met with officials of the Chinese firm ZTE Corp., which got the US$329 million contract for the broadband project.

Abalos denied brokering for the National Broadband Network project despite admitting he knew some officials in ZTE Corp. He admitted to making four trips to China and playing golf there. He also admitted that ZTE officials, who he said were his golf buddies, hosted and paid for the trips.

Jose de Venecia III, son of House Speaker Jose de Venecia Jr., alleged that Abalos offered him US$10 million to withdraw his proposal on the NBN project. De Venecia is a majority shareholder of Amsterdam Holdings Inc., a company that submitted an unsolicited proposal on the NBN project. De Venecia also claimed that Abalos asked for money from the ZTE Corp. officials.

=== Hello Garci scandal ===
Abalos was mentioned in the "Hello Garci" tape, which refers to the alleged wiretapped conversations where vote rigging in the 2004 elections was discussed by, among others, a woman presumed to be President Gloria Arroyo and a man presumed to be COMELEC Commissioner Virgilio Garcillano.

=== Mega Pacific ===
Abalos was the COMELEC chair when the election body approved a P1.3-billion contract with the Mega Pacific Consortium for the purchase of automated counting machines, which the Supreme Court in January 2004 declared as void because of "clear violation of law and jurisprudence" and "reckless disregard of COMELEC's own bidding rules and procedure."

On January 21, 2004, Senator Aquilino Pimentel Jr. filed criminal and administrative charges before the Ombudsman against Abalos and other commissioners in connection with the deal. Abalos described the charges as a "demolition job."

Pimentel accused Abalos and the other commissioners of committing an act of impropriety when they and their wives traveled to Seoul, South Korea to visit the plant of the maker of the counting machines a few months before the bidding for the contract started. Pimentel said he received information that the Korean company paid for the plane tickets and hotel accommodations for the trip.

However, Abalos claimed that the expenses for the trip were paid for out of the P1 million he won in a golf tournament in Wack Wack Golf and Country Club.

On September 27, 2006, the Ombudsman, in a resolution, absolved all respondents involved in the Mega Pacific controversy of all administrative and criminal liabilities "for lack of probable cause." It also reversed its June 28 resolution which contained factual findings that can be used by the House of Representatives to initiate impeachment proceedings against COMELEC Commissioner Resureccion Borra.

=== Website hacking ===
Just six weeks before the 2016 Philippine general election, the COMELEC website was hacked by a group called "Anonymous Philippines" on the night of March 27, 2016. Anonymous Philippines asked the poll body to implement security on Precinct Count Optical Scanners (PCOS)—automated voting machines. Another group calling itself LulzSec Pilipinas, claimed to have hacked COMELEC's website, and posted its database on their Facebook account shortly after Anonymous Philippines compromised COMELEC's website. These exploits exposed voter data and the vulnerability of both voter registration data and the functionality of their website. LulzSec posts 3 mirror links on their Facebook account that can be downloaded. The incident was considered the biggest private leak data in the Philippine history and leaving millions of registered voters at risk.

The sensitive information, which included the full name, complete address, and passport number of at least 55–70 million Filipino registered voters, was leaked publicly on a website called wehaveyourdata, allegedly created by hacker LulzSec Philippines. Anyone who had access to this website could type the first name, surname, and middle name of the compromised registered voters on the search bar provided and the sensitive information would be revealed. The website was taken down by the NBI on April 22. COMELEC spokesperson James Jimenez warned the public not to use the website, warning this could be a phishing site. On April 21, COMELEC apologized for the privacy attacks by the hackers.

=== 2022 National Elections ===
==== Threat of jailing critics ====
On April 23, 2022, a few weeks before the 2022 Philippine general election, COMELEC commissioner Rey Bulay threatened with arrest individuals who would publicly state that COMELEC was biased towards a certain candidate or might be involved in election fraud.

“Iyon pong nagko-comment ng public opinion na ang Comelec ay may sina-side-an, may kinakampihan, at mandadaya, ako po ay nagwawarning sa inyo, we will not hesitate to call upon the AFP na sa panahong ito ay nasa ilalim ng control ng Comelec para patulan at ipahuli at ipakulong kayo,”

“To those issuing public opinion that Comelec is biased or that it would cause election fraud, I am warning you that we would not hesitate to call upon the Armed Forces of the Philippines, which is now under Comelec control, to round you up and have you jailed”

– Commissioner Rey Bulay said during a press briefing.

The statement was made allegedly in support of a different statement by COMELEC Commissioner Socorro Inting who in turn was commenting on a statement released by supporters of then presidential candidate and Vice-president Leni Robredo who called for COMELEC to remain nonpartisan for the sake of the elections. Commissioner Inting commented that it was simply unnecessary to call on the COMELEC to hold a “nonpartisan” election. The commissioner also noted how such statements are liable to cast doubt on the legitimacy of the commission and by extension the elections themselves. Local news agency Rappler noted that it was unclear why Commissioner Inting took offense to this statement released by the supporters of Leni Robredo, which simply reminded the commission to hold fair and safe elections.

Several lawmakers and concerned groups slammed the statement by the Comelec. Detained Senator Leila de Lima called the threat by Commissioner Bulay "uncalled for and illegal". She noted that the Armed Forces of the Philippines are only allowed to arrest individuals during times of lawless violence while under orders from the Commander-in-Chief. She noted that while COMELEC has expansive powers during an election season, this "does not include the power to use the AFP in stifling criticisms and suppressing free speech”. In a separate statement, House Assistant Minority Leader and party-list Representative France Castro called on COMELEC to withdraw its statement, calling the commission hypersensitive to criticisms thrown at it by the populace. The representative stated that citizens are well within their rights to call for "orderly, peaceful and credible elections”.

Following the backlash, Commissioner Bulay commented that his statement was only a warning, and that he was only reminding people to follow the law.

==== Red-tagging and harassment of candidates ====
Red-tagging has been used as a "weapon" against opposition candidates during election campaigns, according to media watchdogs and members of the political opposition. Red-tagging has also been used to divert public attention from economic hardships and extrajudicial killings attributed to incumbent candidates.

During the 2022 Philippine presidential election, the red-tagging of presidential candidate Leni Robredo by incumbent officials were frequently featured on the Manila Times and the Daily Tribune, according to media observers. A report by the ASEAN Parliamentarians for Human Rights said that Robredo was the "prime target of intensified disinformation and red-tagging in social media leading up to election day." The report also said that candidates and elected representatives of the Makabayan bloc were also red-tagged. Former Congress representative and senatorial candidate Neri Colmenares said that red-tagging increased during elections and targeted opposition candidates who protested the Philippine government's poor COVID pandemic response, the Anti-Terrorism Law, and the extrajudicial killing of activists. Colmenares said that candidates of the Otso Diretso senatorial slate were also red-tagged during the 2019 election campaign, and that the red-tagging died down after the election.

In February 2025, the Philippine Commission on Elections (COMELEC) issued Resolution No. 11116, which made red-tagging and discrimination during election campaigns offenses punishable with imprisonment of one to six years and disqualification from public office. COMELEC Chair George Erwin Garcia said that the policy is based on the Supreme Court ruling that defined red-tagging as an act that threatens individuals.

In March 2025, during the campaign for the 2025 Philippine general election, Bayan Muna party-list nominee Neri Colmenares filed a complaint urging COMELEC to investigate allegations of red-tagging and vilification constituting "massive and widespread black propaganda" and the destruction of campaign materials. Vote Report PH noted reports of red-tagging, harassment, and disinformation prior to the elections, alongside vote buying and abuse of government resources in campaigns.

The International Coalition for Human Rights in the Philippines stated that red-tagging was the most common election violation as of April 30, 2025, making up 78.7% of the election violations it had recorded. "This level of systematic red-tagging is not only a violation of human rights, it's a coordinated effort to intimidate and discredit democratic actors," the group said.

=== Election of Alice Guo ===
The role of the Comelec was put into scrutiny in 2024 when Alice Guo was elected as mayor of Bamban, Tarlac in the 2022 election. Guo is alleged to be a Chinese citizen in the Senate inquiry, consequentially putting the validity of her election as mayor. Comelec was questioned on why Guo's candidacy was not disputed at the time with the election body stating it cannot on its own or motu proprio question the eligibility of candidates. Someone else has to file a formal petition. Comelec opened its own investigation in July 2024. Guo was removed from office by the Ombudsman over her links to illicit activities of Philippine Offshore Gaming Operators (POGOs).

The same still applies for the 2025 election, even if Guo did sought reelection. The controversy also led to the Comelec to decide to publish online all the certificates of candidacies of aspirants for the 2025 election.

== See also ==
- Election commission
- Presidential Electoral Tribunal
- Senate Electoral Tribunal
- House of Representatives Electoral Tribunal
