= Laban sign =

Filipino hand gesture

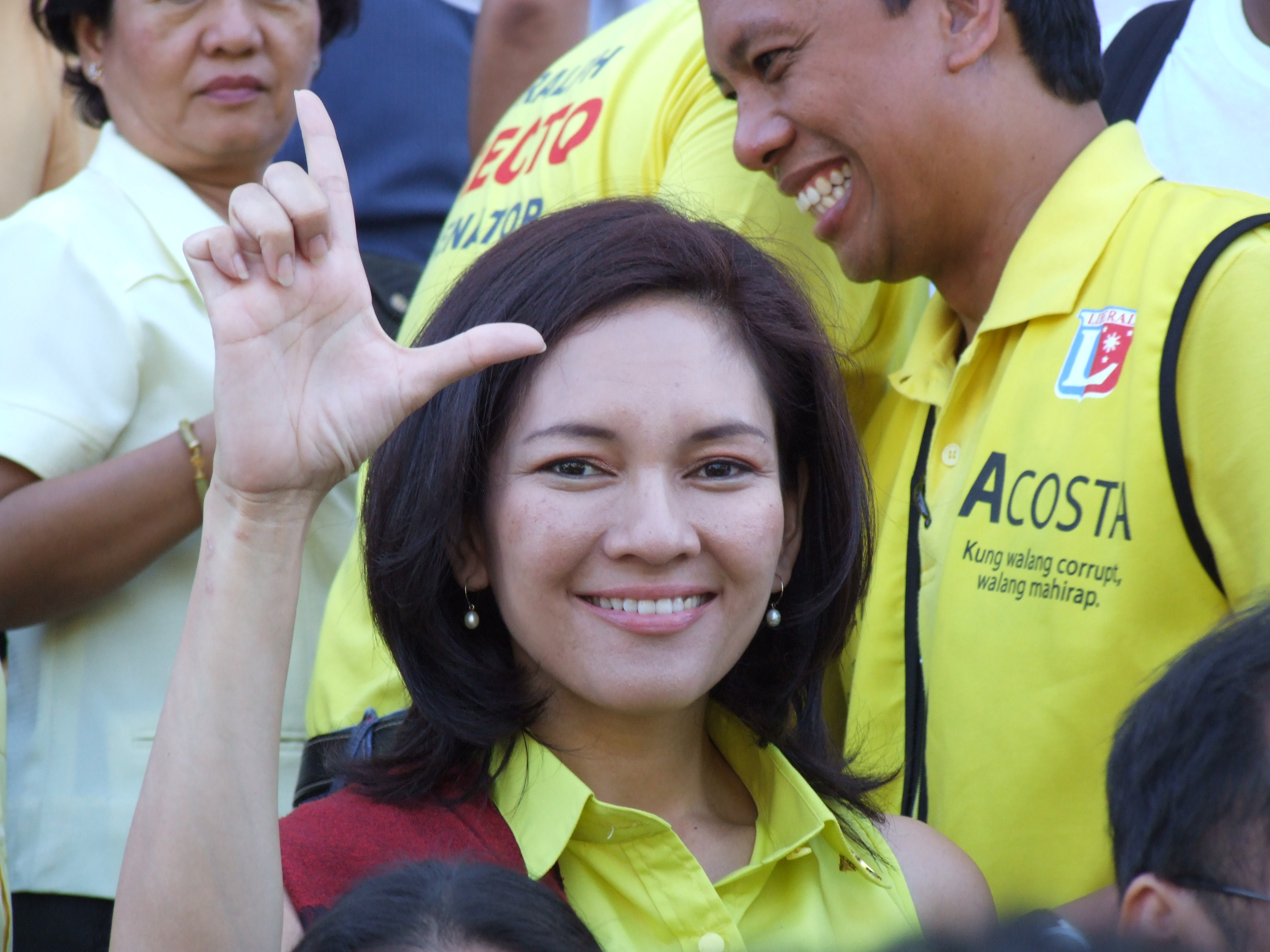
Risa Hontiveros displaying Corazon Aquino's iconic laban (fight) hand symbol after joining the Liberal Party in their campaign in the 2010 elections.

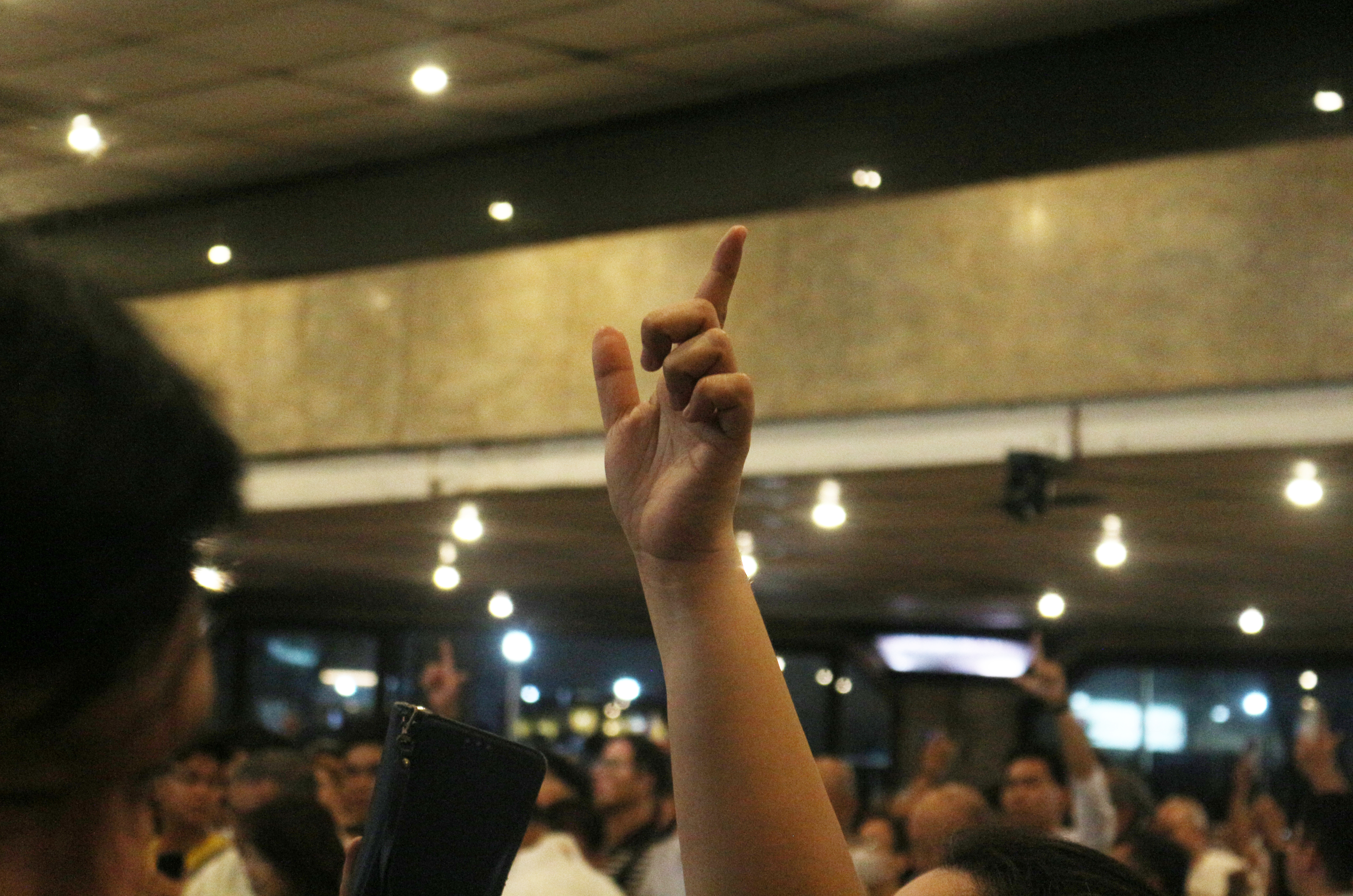
Massgoers raise the Laban sign during Bayan Ko at the EDSA Shrine, marking the 40th anniversary of the People Power Revolution.

The Laban sign is a Filipino hand gesture made by extending the thumb horizontally and the index finger pointing up, leaving the other fingers closed to create the letter L, which stands for laban (Filipino for "fight"). It is sometimes mistaken for the mildly offensive Western "loser" and "raised gun" gestures, to which it is unrelated.

== Background and usage ==
The term "LABAN" is an abbreviation of Lakas ng Bayan ("People's Power"), a former political coalition organised by opposition Senator Benigno S. Aquino Jr. for the 1978 Interim Batasang Pambansa regional elections.

The gesture was popularized in 1983 during Senator Aquino's funeral, and the 1986 People Power Revolution that his assassination had precipitated. The Laban sign branding was bestowed on Ninoy's widow, Cory Aquino, along with the color yellow by Public Relations practitioner Reli German.

In 2009, the Laban sign was again widely seen during the funeral of Cory Aquino, and the subsequent presidential campaign of their son, President Benigno Aquino III, before the 2010 Philippine elections. In 2021, upon announcing the presidential bid of Vice President Leni Robredo for the upcoming 2022 elections, the gesture was associated with her campaign.

In June 12, 2026, Senator Alan Peter Cayetano invoked the Laban sign amidst a Senate leadership crisis during a Facebook livestream and his removal as Senate president on June 3, he insist that he remains Senate president. The August Twenty-One Movement criticized Cayetano for appropriating the gesture for his political gain.

== See also ==
- Faz o L, a Brazilian political hand gesture similar to Laban sign
- Loser (hand gesture)
- Duterte fist
