= Loser (hand gesture) =

Hand gesture used as a taunt

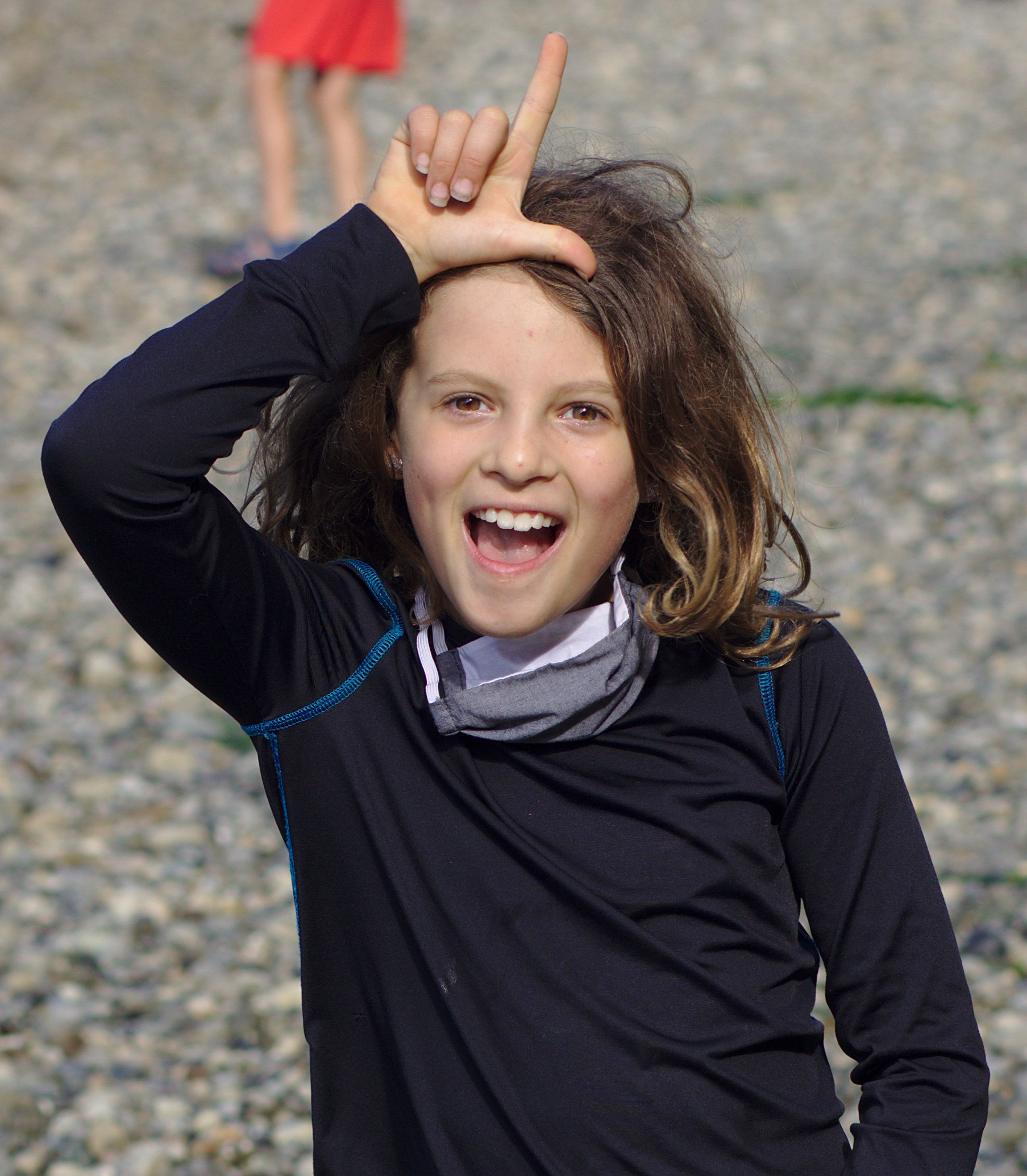
Child making the loser gesture

The loser is a hand gesture made by extending the right thumb and index fingers, leaving the other fingers closed to create the letter L, interpreted as "loser", and generally given as a demeaning sign. Sometimes this is accompanied by raising the hand to the giver's forehead. The gesture was popular in the 1990s, partly popularized by the 1994 movie Ace Ventura: Pet Detective.

== Usage of an "L" hand sign in specific contexts ==
In Brazil, the "L" is the political symbol of voting in Lula da Silva for president. Also, in Brazil, Germán Cano, soccer player from Fluminense, use the L to commemorate when he scores a goal. Also in Brazil, an "L" handsign is used for cheering for Brazilian e-sports players from LOUD organization (e.g. during "VCT 2023: LOCK // IN" event in São Paulo).

In Poland, the "L" denotes allegiance to the Legia Warszawa football club. In the Philippines, the Laban sign is a political hand gesture which creates a letter "L" that stands for laban (Filipino for "fight").
