= Aimee Torrefranca-Neri =

Filipina lawyer

The Honorable Aimee Torrefranca-Neri
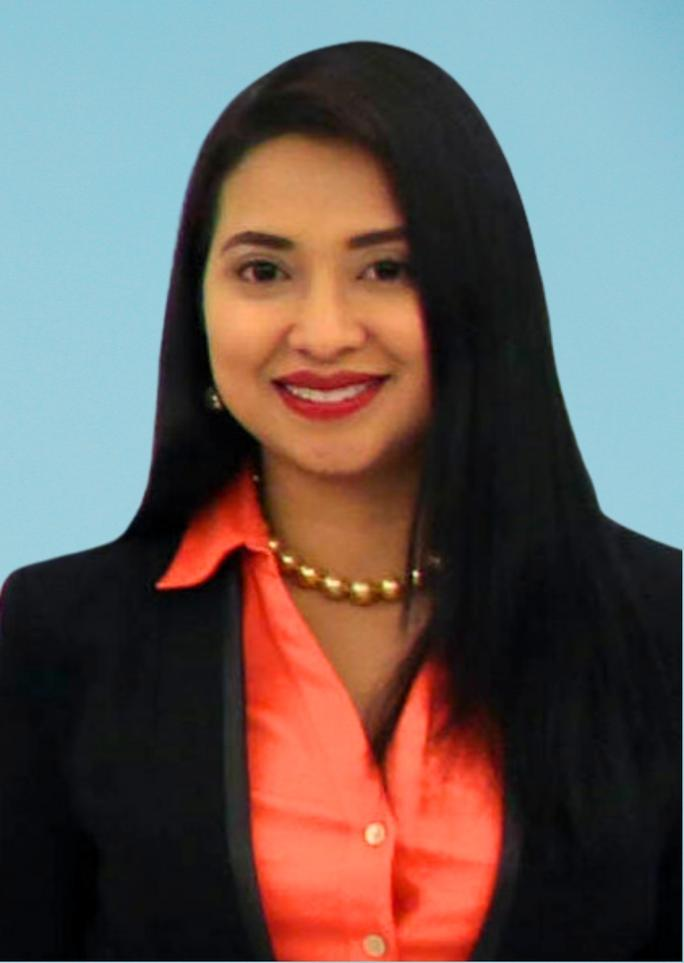
- Torrefranca-Neri in 2017

Commissioner of the Commission on Elections
- In office March 8, 2022 – June 2, 2022
- President: Rodrigo Duterte

Personal details
- Born: Aimee Torrefranca
- Party: Partido Demokratiko Pilipino
- Profession: Lawyer

Aimee Torrefranca-Neri is a Filipina lawyer. She served as Commissioner of the Philippine Commission on Elections or COMELEC from March 8, 2022, until June 2, 2022. Prior to being appointed in the COMELEC, she served as the assistant secretary of the Philippine Department of Justice in 2016, as deputy commissioner of the Philippine Bureau of Immigration in 2017, and as undersecretary of the Philippine Department of Social Welfare and Development in 2018.

== Early career ==
During her stint at the Mayor's Office of Davao City, she was a special counsel for violence against women and children.

== Career ==
In 2022, President Duterte appointed Torrefranca-Neri along with two other commissioners to the Philippine Commission on Elections. Torrefranca-Neri failed to retain her post after the Commission on Appointments bypassed her appointment.

== Controversies ==
Torrefranca-Neri was allegedly a "fixer" while working as assistant secretary of the Philippine Department of Justice under the Duterte administration. Filipino lawyer Ferdinand Topacio claims that convicted drug lord Herbert Colanggo bribed Torrefranca-Neri 10 million pesos to "fix" a robbery case before the Philippine Supreme Court.
