= Finger gun =

Hand gesture

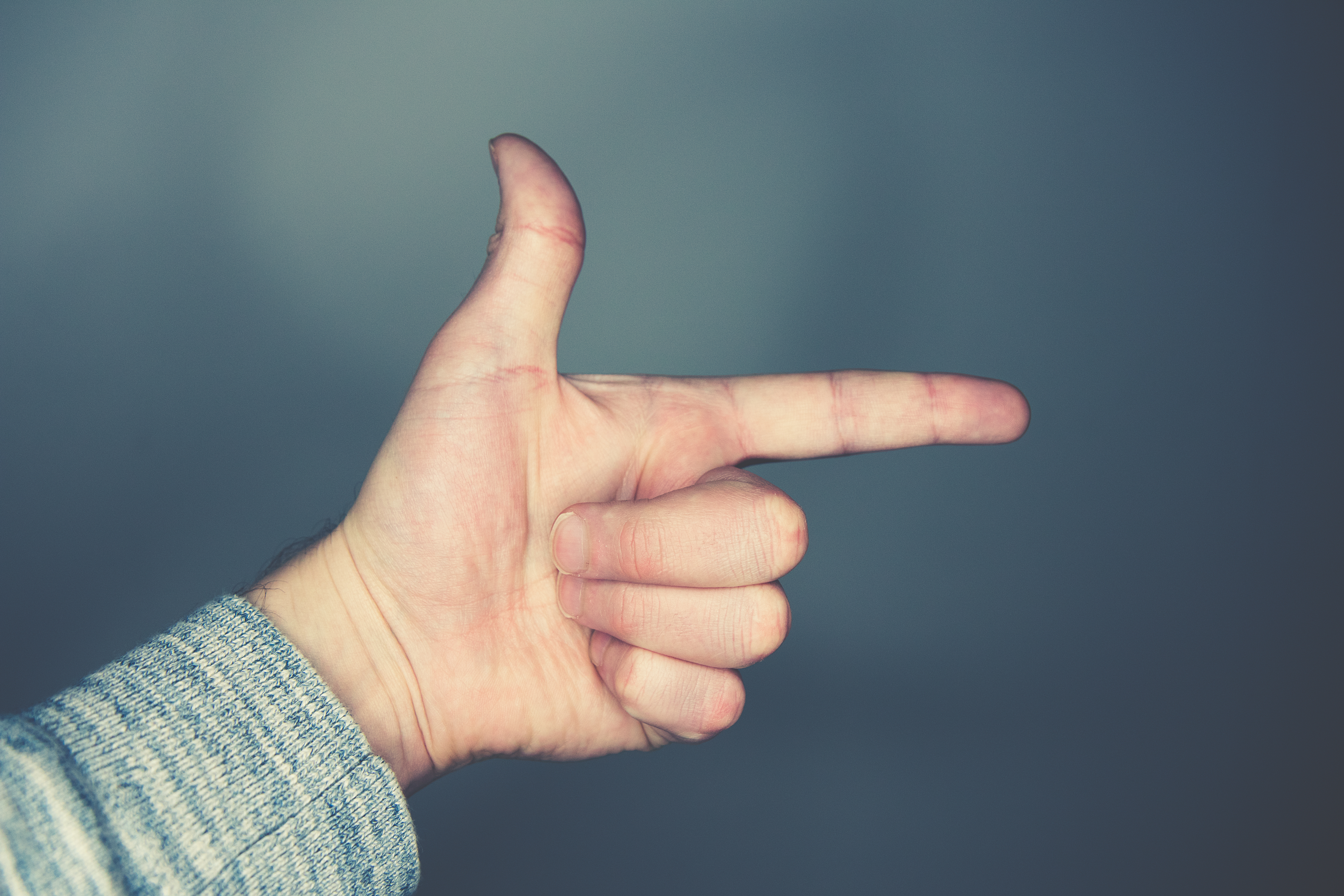
The finger gun gesture

The finger gun is a hand gesture in which a person will use their hand to mimic a handgun, raising their thumb above their fist to act as a hammer, and one or two fingers extended perpendicular to it acting as a barrel. The middle finger can also act as the trigger finger or part of the barrel itself. The finger can be swung upward to emulate muzzle rise. An optional clicking of the fingers or making firing sounds with the mouth can be included when forming the "gun" to emphasise the gesture. The gesture can be intended to be a friendly gesture or a threat, among other meanings, depending on context.

== Variations ==
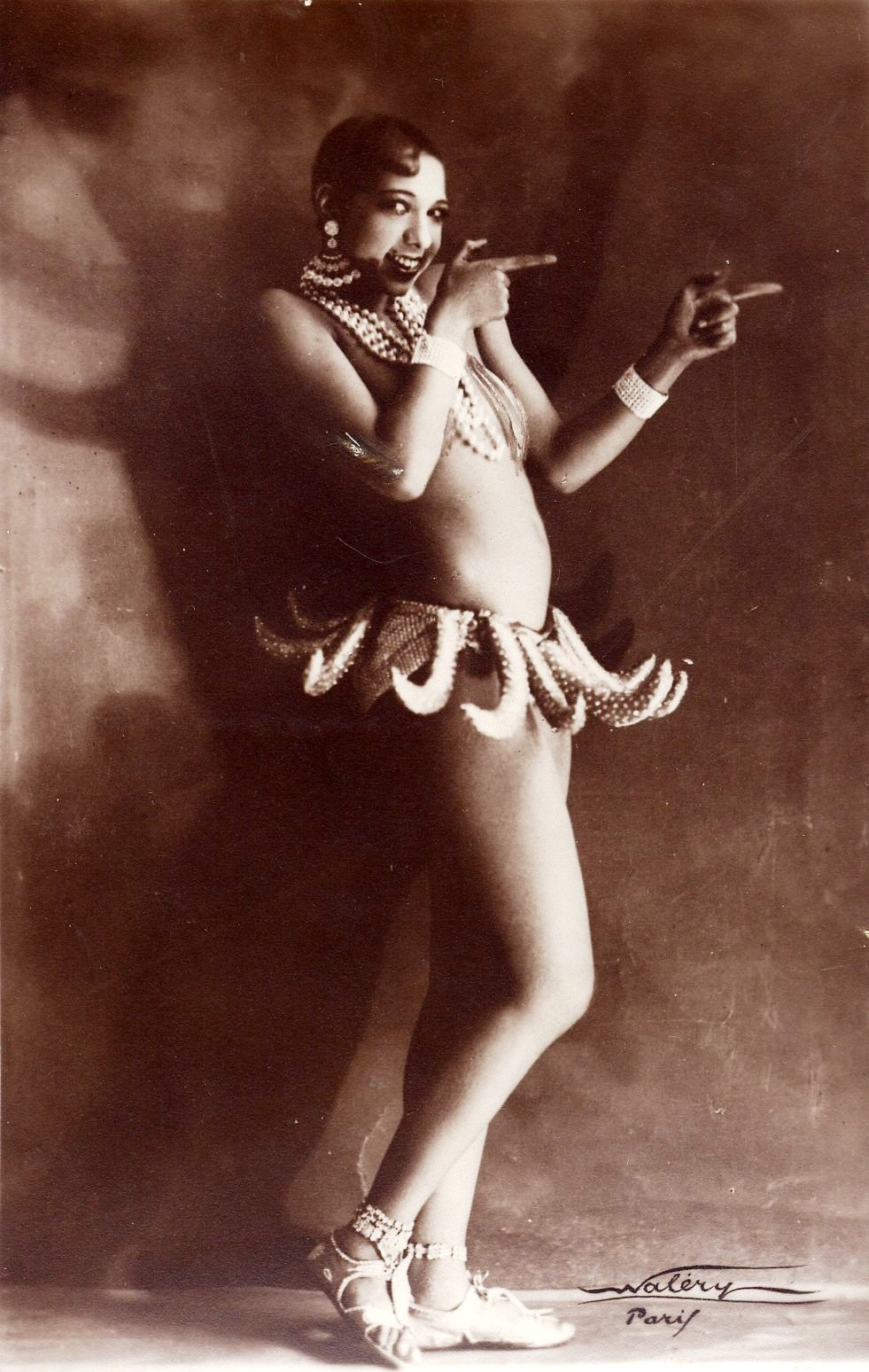
Josephine Baker making playful finger guns with both hands, 1927

One or two "finger guns" can be used to express a greeting or to acknowledge something as funny, clever, or insightful, like Gotcha! or What's up?

A single "finger gun" pointed to the side of one's own head is sometimes used to indicate a desire to be put out of one's misery, either from boredom, exasperation, or to express one's dislike for a situation. A finger gun is typically pointed at another person and can be used as a threatening or insulting gesture, as to suggest that they could or should be shot.

== Laws and rulings ==
In 2019, the Superior Court of Pennsylvania ruled that using a "gun-like hand gesture", "imitating the firing and recoiling of a gun" as intimidation, is a crime of disorderly conduct.

=== In schools ===
Children, teenagers and teacher's assistants have occasionally been punished or removed from school for making the gesture. In some cases, this was because authority figures interpreted it as a signal for threatening real violence, while in others they interpreted it as unacceptably supportive of gun violence in general. These have often been labeled as "ridiculous" by most commentators.

In 2006, Fahim Ahmad allegedly made the gesture when speaking about the possibility of Canadian Security Intelligence Service agents coming to his apartment, which was used as evidence of his conspiracy to commit terrorism by a police informant.

=== In sports ===
The finger gun gesture has been ruled to be unsportsmanlike conduct in sports leagues, making a player liable to be ejected. Brandon Jennings of the Washington Wizards was ejected from a game and fined $35,000 by the National Basketball Association (NBA) after he made finger guns during an altercation with Jared Dudley of the Phoenix Suns during a game in 2017; Dudley was also ejected and fined the same amount. In 2024, George Pickens of the Pittsburgh Steelers was penalized for unsportsmanlike conduct after he directed finger guns at the stands in Cincinnati, drawing a rebuke from his coach, Mike Tomlin. The Pennsylvania Interscholastic Athletic Association (PIAA) announced in 2025 that any basketball player who simulates a weapon, including finger guns, would be penalized, such as by being given a technical foul or ejected from a game. Ja Morant, an NBA player for the Memphis Grizzlies who had previously been suspended by the league for posting videos in which he wielded real firearms, was fined $75,000 in 2025 after repeatedly making finger-gun gestures after making three-pointers. The league had warned Morant after he made the gesture in a previous game, then fined him after he continued making the gesture in his next game.

== Politics ==
=== Brazil ===
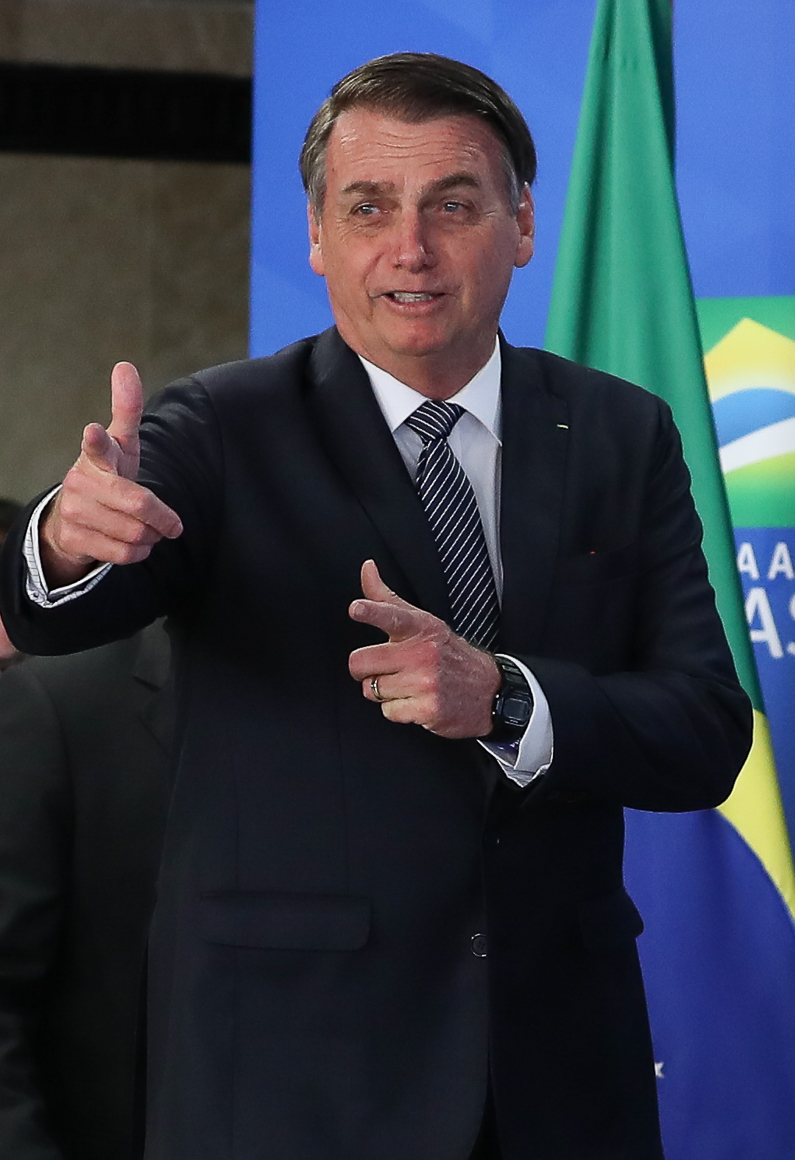
Jair Bolsonaro making the finger gun gesture

Former president of Brazil Jair Bolsonaro usually makes the finger gun gesture when alluding to his ideas of changing the gun control laws to make weapons more accessible to the regular citizen. This gesture became a symbol of the Bolsonarism, being used by supporters of the ideology.

On 27 September 2019, Jair Bolsonaro's son, deputy Eduardo Bolsonaro (PSL), posed for a photo in front of the Non-Violence sculpture at the United Nations headquarters in New York City making the finger gun gesture.

== In popular culture ==
In cinema, the gesture has been used extensively, often for comedic effect, and two well-known cases are those in the Italian film Where Are You Going on Holiday? in 1978, in which it is done by the character played by Elisabetta Pozzi, and in the 1985 film The Breakfast Club, in which it is used by actress Ally Sheedy. Additional examples include Death Wish, The Losers, The Expendables 2, Crank, Better Call Saul, Taxi Driver, Gran Torino, Reservoir Dogs, Ferris Bueller's Day Off, Spring Breakers and Scott Pilgrim vs. the World. The finger gun is used multiple times by the titular character from the TV series Veronica Mars. It is also famously used in both UK and U.S. versions of The Office. The gesture is also used as a technique in YuYu Hakusho by the main character, Yusuke Urameshi, whereby he can shoot spirit energy out of his index finger, the Spirit Gun. Makima from Chainsaw Man also utilizes a finger gun to launch an invisible force. In Bean: The Ultimate Disaster Movie, Mr Bean, after pretending to carry a concealed weapon in front of a police officer and being ordered at gunpoint to take it out and place it on the floor, reaches into his pocket before pulling his hand out while making the finger gun gesture.

The covers of several video games in the Borderlands series feature a masked character pointing finger guns at his own head. In the 2007 video game Team Fortress 2, the Heavy can use a finger gun as a taunt kill, killing anyone in front of him when he 'fires' it. As part of an April Fools' Day update in the 2017 video game Fortnite Battle Royale, a pistol known as "Finger Guns" was added as a joke.

== See also ==
- Pointing, a similar hand gesture
