= Apostolic Nunciature to the Philippines =

Vatican ambassador in Manila

Apostolic Nunciature in the Philippines
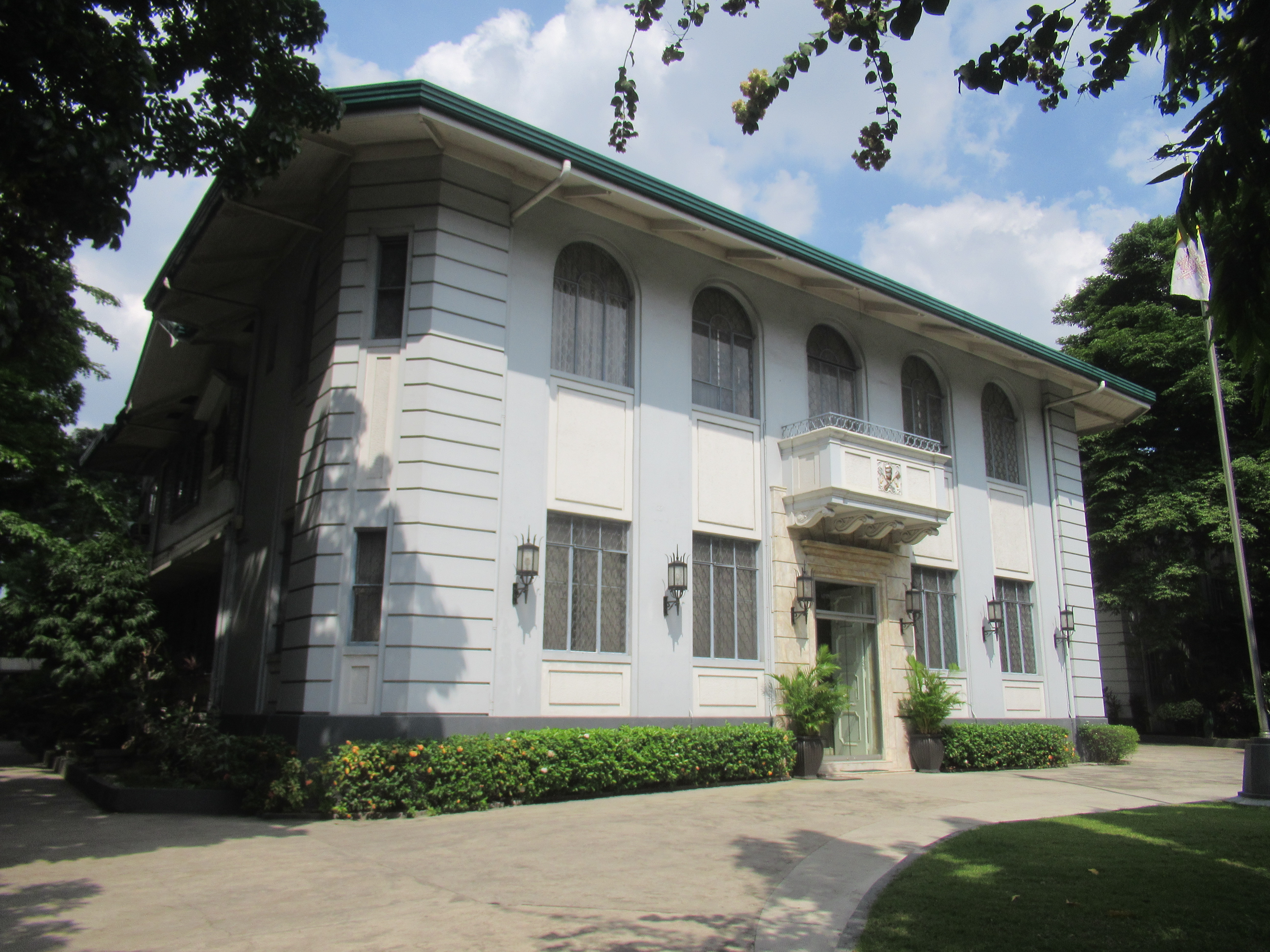
- Address: 2140 Taft Avenue, Malate, Manila, Philippines
- Coordinates: 14°34′9.8616″N 120°59′32.6796″E
- Apostolic Nuncio: Most Rev. Charles John Brown, DD

The Apostolic Nunciature in the Philippines is a top-level diplomatic mission assigned by the Holy See to the Philippines, located at 2140 Taft Avenue, Malate, Manila.

Diplomatically, an apostolic nuncio may be equivalent to an ambassador, and often carries the ecclesial title of archbishop. The nuncio works closely with the Archdiocese of Manila, and is by custom the dean of the diplomatic corps.

== History ==
The Apostolic Nunciature in the Philippines was erected circa 1899. Though the official residence of the nuncio is located in Manila, he is not subject to the Archdiocese of Manila but directly to the Pope like other bishops and archbishops, including those who are cardinals, as he is the Pope's representative in the Philippines.

=== World War II ===
When the Philippines was caught in World War II following the commencement of the Japanese invasion of East Asia, communication between the Holy See and the Philippine Delegation (Msgr. Guglielmo Piani, SDB), or any of the other delegations of the region, was not permitted. However, the Apostolic Delegation in Tokyo (Msgr. Paolo Marella) was permitted to communicate with the censored delegations.

In 1943, the Second Philippine Republic was inaugurated. In a letter dated October 14, 1943 (the day of the inauguration), the newly elected president of the puppet government, Jose P. Laurel, wrote to Luigi Cardinal Maglione, the Vatican secretary of state:

I have the honor to inform your excellency that of october fourteenth nineteen hundred and forty three the Philippines proclaimed her independence and declared herself a sovereign nation and organised a Government republican in form.' In comunicating [sic] the foregoing to your excellency, I desire to take advantage of the opportunity to express my sincere desire that there shall exist between the two countries the most cordial relation of amity and friendship. With the assurance your excellency of my most distinguished consideration.

Although Cardinal Maglione received the telegram, he told the Japanese ambassador to the Holy See, Ken Harada, that as long as the war continued, the Holy See would not recognize any new states, including the new Philippine Republic. Harada acknowledged the Holy See's decision and did not pursue the matter further. Later, Cardinal Maglione directed Msgr. Piani, through Msgr. Marella, to continue to pursue and protect the interests of the Catholic religion in the country. He added that the local bishops are permitted to deal with local ecclesiastical affairs as long as they are not diplomatic in character. However, they could, if necessary, appeal to the authorities on affairs that are purely ecclesiastical.

The apostolic delegation helped clear up a misunderstanding that Msgr. Paul Taguchi, archbishop of Osaka, visited Manila not to supplant the authority of the archbishop of Manila, but to establish contacts with the Catholics of that city.

Rumors were also spreading that Pope Pius XII had personally communicated a telegram to Laurel. Maglione clarified via a letter to the Apostolic Delegate in London that since the Holy See did not recognize any new states for the duration of the war, no such telegram was ever sent.

== Role in the hierarchy: vicariates ==
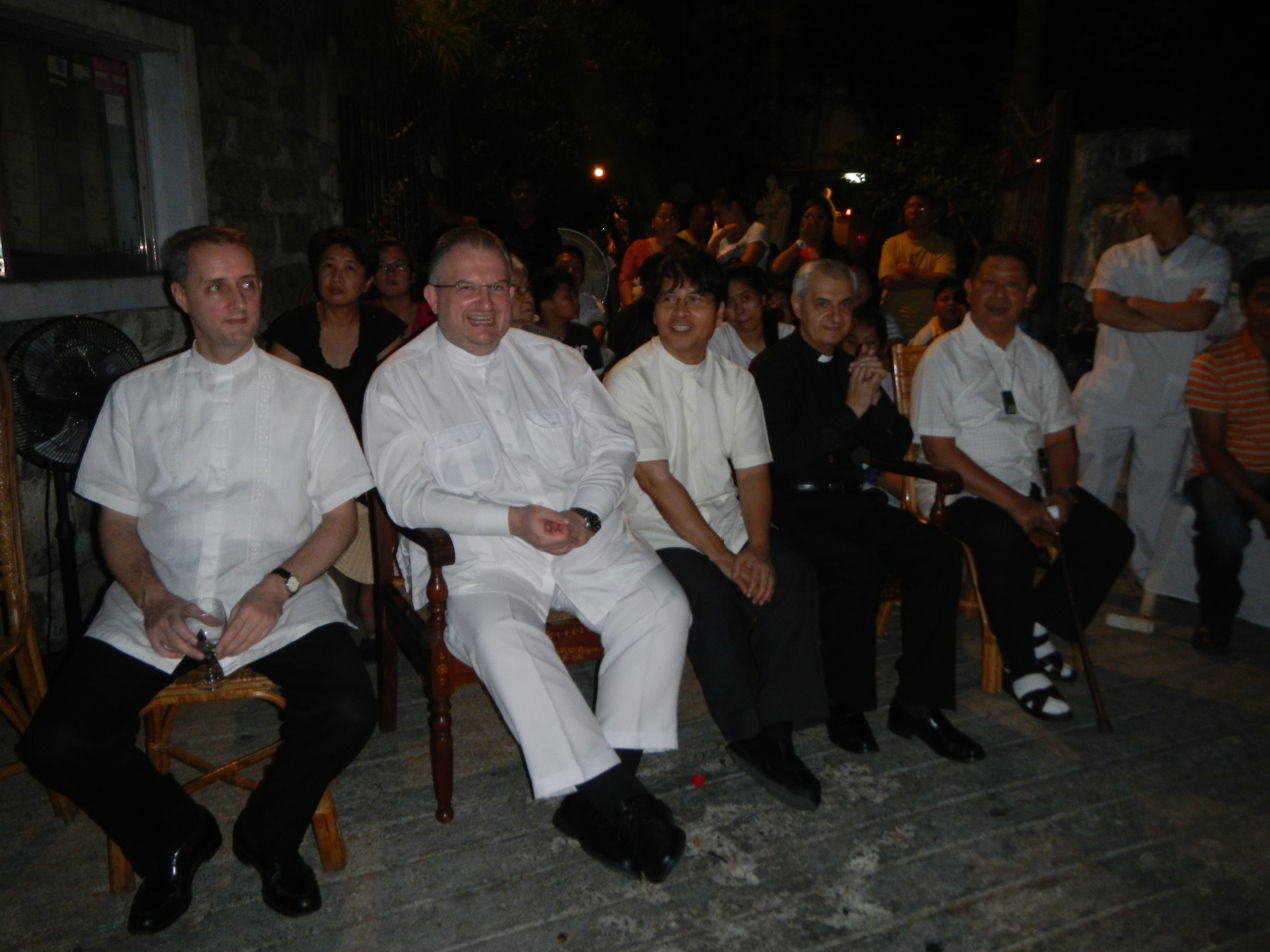
Monsignor Giuseppe Pinto, Apostolic Nuncio to the Philippines (fourth from left seated), at the Good Friday processions of Baliuag, Bulacan

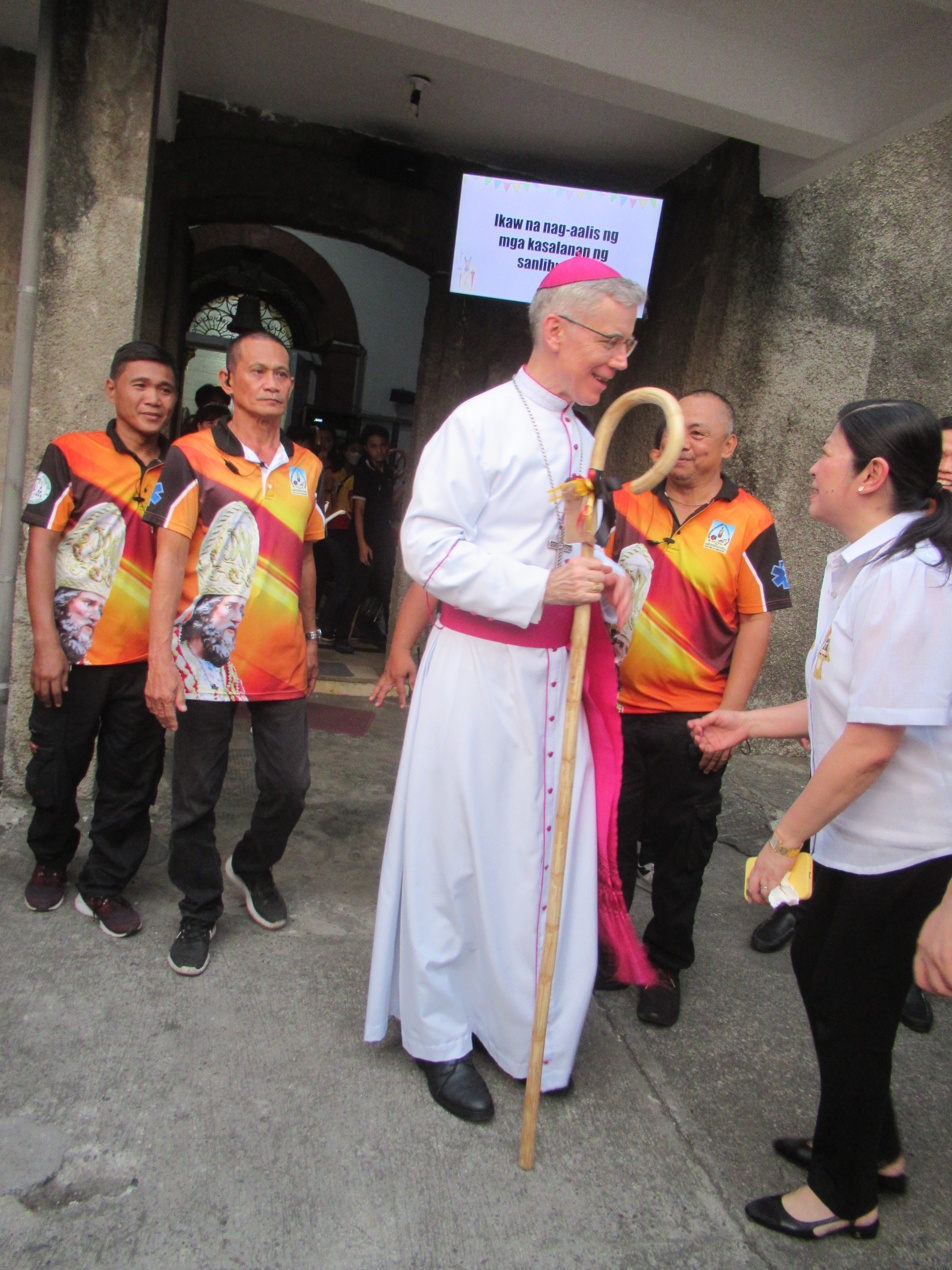
Archbishop Charles John Brown, Fiesta

As an apostolic vicar, the nuncio also serves a role in the hierarchy of the Catholic Church. An apostolic vicariate is a territorial jurisdiction established in areas which do not have a diocese and the nuncio serves as metropolitan to these vicariates.

In the Philippines, the apostolic vicariates are:

- Apostolic Vicariate of Bontoc-Lagawe
- Apostolic Vicariate of Jolo
- Apostolic Vicariate of Puerto Princesa
- Apostolic Vicariate of San Jose in Mindoro
- Apostolic Vicariate of Tabuk
- Apostolic Vicariate of Taytay

== List of papal representatives to the Philippines ==
=== Apostolic delegates ===
In 1899 a papal legation with the rank of apostolic delegation in the Philippines was established. There have been seven apostolic delegates of the Philippines, until the Vatican promoted the papal legation in the Philippines to the status of apostolic nunciature on August 9, 1951.

No.	Picture	Name	Born	Died	Term	Coat of arms
1.		Placide Louis Chapelle	August 28, 1842; Fraissinet-de-Lozère, Lozère, France	August 09, 1905; New Orleans, Louisiana, United States	September 28, 1899 – April 30, 1901	
2.		Donato Sbarretti	November 12, 1856; Montefranco, Italy	April 01, 1939; Rome, Italy	September 16, 1901 – December 26, 1902	
3.		Giovanni Battista Guidi	April 26, 1852; Collepardo, Italy	July 22, 1904; Manila, Philippines	September 25, 1902 – June 22, 1904	
4.		Ambrose Agius, O.S.B	September 17, 1856; Alexandria, Egypt	December 13, 1911; Manila, Philippines	September 05, 1904 – December 13, 1911	
5.		Giuseppe Petrelli	February 14, 1873; Montegiorgio, Italy	April 29, 1962; Lima, Peru	May 30, 1915 – May 27, 1921	
6.		Guglielmo Piani, S.D.B.	September 16, 1875; Martinengo, Italy	September 27, 1956; Mexico City, Mexico	March 17, 1922 – October 05, 1948	
7.		Egidio Vagnozzi	February 26, 1906; Rome, Italy	December 26, 1980; Rome, Italy	March 09, 1949 – August 09, 1951	

=== Apostolic nuncios ===
No.	Picture	Name	Born	Died	Term	Coat of arms
7.		Egidio Vagnozzi	February 26, 1906; Rome, Italy	December 26, 1980; Rome, Italy	August 09, 1951 – December 16, 1958	
8.		Salvatore Siino	October 05, 1904; Capaci, Italy	October 08, 1963; Rome, Italy	March 14, 1959 – October 08, 1963	
9.		Carlo Martini	October 01, 1913; Cadeo, Italy	July 16, 1986; Piacenza, Italy	November 29, 1963 – August 05, 1967	
10.		Carmine Rocco	April 12, 1912; Camigliano, Italy	May 12, 1982; Rome, Italy	September 16, 1967 – May 22, 1973	
11.		Bruno Torpigliani	April 15, 1915; Asciano, Italy	May 02, 1990; Asciano, Italy	June 06, 1973 – April 10, 1990	
12.		Gian Vincenzo Moreni	January 29, 1932; Montichiari, Italy	March 03, 1999; Montichiari, Italy	September 08, 1990 – March 03, 1999	
13.		Antonio Franco	March 24, 1937; Puglianello, Italy	November 15, 2026; Puglianello, Italy	April 06, 1999 – January 21, 2006	
14.		Fernando Filoni	April 15, 1946; Manduria, Italy		February 25, 2006 – June 09, 2007	
15.		Edward Joseph Adams	August 24, 1944; Philadelphia, Pennsylvania, United States		September 03, 2007 – February 22, 2011	
16.		Giuseppe Pinto	May 26, 1952; Noci, Italy		May 10, 2011 – July 01, 2017	
17.		Gabriele Giordano Caccia	February 24, 1958; Milan, Italy		September 12, 2017 – November 16, 2019	
18.		Charles John Brown	October 13, 1959; New York City, New York, United States		September 28, 2020	

== See also ==
- Holy See–Philippines relations
- List of diplomatic missions of the Holy See
- List of diplomatic missions in the Philippines
- Foreign relations of the Holy See
- Foreign relations of the Philippines
- Catholic Church in the Philippines
- Embassy of the Philippines to the Holy See
