= Rufino Santos =

Filipino archbishop and cardinal (1908–1973)

His Eminence Rufino Jiao Santos
- Cardinal, Archbishop of Manila
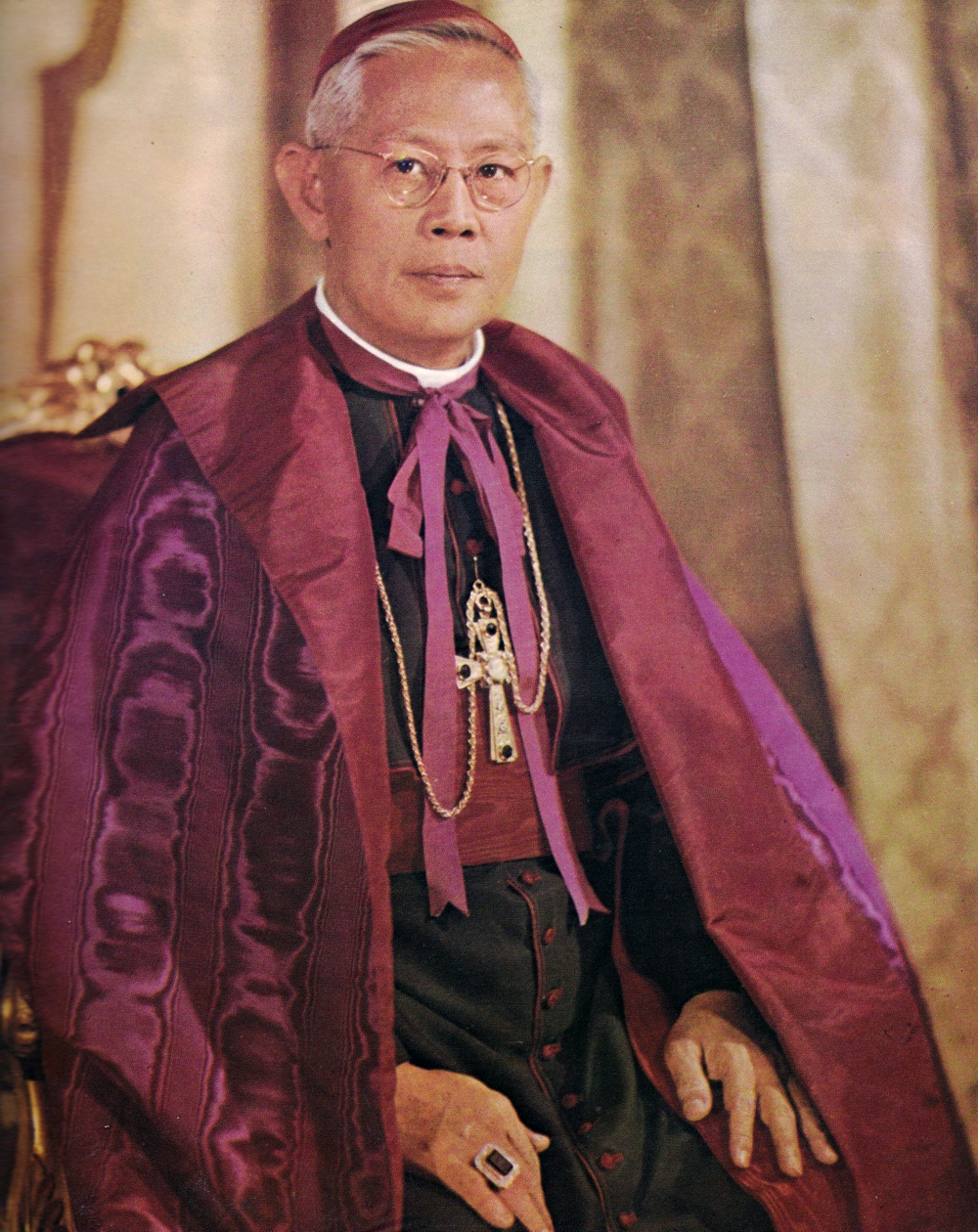
- Province: Manila
- See: Manila
- Appointed: February 10, 1953
- Installed: March 25, 1953
- Term ended: September 3, 1973
- Predecessor: Gabriel M. Reyes
- Successor: Jaime Sin
- Other post: Cardinal-Priest of Santa Maria ai Monti
- Previous posts: Auxiliary Bishop of Manila (1947–53); Apostolic Administrator of Lipa (1950–53); Apostolic Administrator of Infanta (1950–53); Archdiocese of Manila Military Ordinariate (1951–73)

Orders
- Ordination: October 25, 1931
- Consecration: October 24, 1947 by Michael J. O'Doherty
- Created cardinal: March 28, 1960 by Pope John XXIII
- Rank: Cardinal-Priest

Personal details
- Born: Rufino Jiao Santos; August 26, 1908 Guagua, Pampanga, The Philippine Islands
- Died: September 3, 1973 (aged 65) Manila, Philippines
- Buried: Crypt at the Manila Cathedral
- Denomination: Roman Catholic
- Parents: Gaudencio Santos; Rosalia Jiao
- Motto: Caritas in Dilectione "Charity in Love"
- Coat of arms

Styles of Rufino J. Cardinal Santos
- Reference style: His Eminence
- Spoken style: Your Eminence
- Religious style: Monsignor
- Informal style: Cardinal
- See: Manila

Rufino Jiao Santos (August 26, 1908 – September 3, 1973) was the 29th archbishop of Manila from February 10, 1953, until his death on September 3, 1973, and was the first Filipino elevated to the rank of cardinal.

== Early life and education ==
Born in Barrio Sto. Niño, Guagua, Pampanga, Santos was the fourth of seven children of Gaudencio Santos, an overseer of farmland near Mount Arayat, and Rosalia Jiao y Romero. Rufino's three older brothers were Manuel, Emiliano, and Quirino; his three sisters were Clara, Jovita, and Exequiela. Santos, nicknamed "Pinong", grew up in a house located 30 meters (98 ft) from what is now the Immaculate Conception Parish. He was active in church activities as an acolyte and was later a choir member of the Manila Cathedral School. Two factors influenced his priestly vocation: his stint as an altar server and the encouragement of Jose Tahon, the Manila Cathedral's parish priest.

He entered San Carlos Seminary on July 25, 1921, and earned a baccalaureate in canon law in 1929 and a doctorate in sacred theology in July 1931 at the Pontificia Universita Gregoriana. In 1927, the 19-year-old Santos and Leopoldo A. Arcaira, 24—both outstanding students of San Carlos Seminary—were the first recipients of scholarships to the Pontifical Gregorian University in Rome, Italy.

== Ordination and priesthood ==
Santos was granted a papal dispensation to be ordained below the canonical age of 24. On October 25, 1931, two months shy of his 23rd birthday, Rufino J. Santos was ordained a priest at the Basilica of Saint John Lateran in Rome. He then served as an assistant parish priest in Imus, Cavite, and as a parish priest in Marilao, Bulacan.

His eventual successor as archbishop, Cardinal Gaudencio Rosales, said of his actions during the Second World War:

"Santos saved the life of Manila Archbishop Michael O'Doherty by admitting to the Japanese Army that it was he, as a secretary of the archbishop, who donated food to the poor, including Filipino guerrillas. Refusing to collaborate with the Japanese Army, Santos was sentenced to death but was plucked out by the Combined American and Filipino liberation forces on the night of his execution."

== Auxiliary bishop of Manila ==
On August 19, 1947, Santos was appointed an auxiliary bishop of the Archdiocese of Manila and the titular bishop of Barca in modern Libya, and was ordained on October 24 of the same year. From 1950 to 1953, he served as apostolic administrator of the Diocese of Lipa, Diocese of Lucena and of the Prelature of Infanta, pending the appointment of their respective bishops. On December 21, 1950, Santos was appointed the first bishop of the Philippine Military Ordinariate.

== Archbishop of Manila ==
Santos was appointed Archbishop of Manila on February 10, 1953, and was installed on March 25 of the same year. Pope John XXIII made him a cardinal on March 28, 1960, making him the first native Filipino to attain the rank. Santos paved the way for the founding of Catholic Charities (later known as Caritas Manila) and the reconstruction of St. Paul Hospital (now the Cardinal Santos Medical Center), which was originally established by the Maryknoll Sisters but had been damaged by American bombardment during the Second World War. Santos also re-instituted the Philippine Trust Company and the Catholic Travel Office.

During his years in Manila, he rebuilt the Manila Cathedral, which had been destroyed by Allied bombardment during the 1945 Liberation of Manila. It was dedicated on December 10, 1958.

As the metropolitan archbishop of Manila, he was one of the 49 bishops and archbishops from the Philippines to attend the Second Vatican Council, thus making him a council father. He was a member of the conservative wing of the Council known as the Coetus Internationalis Patrum, and greatly contributed to the drafting of documents about the Blessed Virgin Mary in the field of Mariology.

Being the first Filipino Cardinal, Santos became the first Filipino to participate as a cardinal elector in the 1963 conclave that elected Pope Paul VI.

Santos served as archbishop of Manila until 1973. During his tenure, he hosted the visit of Pope Paul VI to the Philippines for the Asian Bishops' Meeting.

Santos established the church-run Radio Veritas and built several important structures, including the Our Lady of Guadalupe Minor Seminary in Makati; the Pius XII Catholic Center in Paco, Manila; and Villa San Miguel, the archbishop's palace in Mandaluyong.

He also founded the Pontificio Collegio Filippino, a college for diocesan priests from the Philippines studying at pontifical universities in Rome, Italy, which was formally established as an institution with pontifical rights by Pope John XXIII on June 29, 1961, through the papal bull Sancta Mater Ecclesia.

== Death ==
Gaudencio Rosales noted that Santos was a diabetic and suffered from a malignant brain tumor.

He died in Manila on September 3, 1973, aged 65. Following his death, a diplomatic report from the United States Embassy in Manila assessed his activities:

Santos' opposition to "Social Action" programs, which he frequently expressed in heavy-handed fashion, did much to perpetuate the Catholic Church's image as a conservative organization, allied with the country's economic and social elite.

His remains lie at the crypt under the main altar of the Manila Cathedral, along with his predecessors: Michael J. O'Doherty and Gabriel M. Reyes, and his successor, Cardinal Jaime Sin. Santos is the most recent Archbishop of Manila to die while in office. (Note: Jaime Sin retired from office in 2003 before dying in 2005. Gaudencio Rosales, who is still living, retired from office in 2011. Luis Antonio Tagle, also living, left the Archdiocese of Manila after being appointed Prefect of the Congregation for the Evangelization of Peoples in 2020.)

== Legacy ==
Santos, the first Filipino cardinal, became the 29th archbishop of Manila in a post-war scenario that saw a nation plagued by: a high dependency on the upper class for the country's social, economic, and political growth; growing inequality in the distribution of wealth; and critical unfairness in labor, land, and tenancy—all catalysts for the resurgence of the communist movement. It was to this disparate social order that Santos spoke upon his installation:

I have thought of organizing a social welfare for uplifting the spirit and soul of these unfortunate members of our community. The Archdiocese will lead in this undertaking with an initial amount of fifty to one hundred thousand pesos. Then I expect the more fortunate of the faithful in the Archdiocese to contribute their help in the amount of 1 peso a month for the same purpose, in order that we may budget some two hundred to two hundred fifty thousand pesos a year for buying food, clothing and medicines for distribution among our poor brethren, and the education of their children.

This plan took shape soon after when the cardinal appointed an eleven-member administrative board on October 1, 1953. The establishment of Caritas Manila (first known as Catholic Charities) brought structure and organization to the implementation of the church's charitable works in the Archdiocese of Manila.

The initial years were largely a period of identifying those who needed help the most, prioritizing and allocating medical aid, food, and clothing when needed. These were superseded by programs that harnessed talents and opened up work opportunities for Manila's marginalized populations, such as educational assistance and job placement programs. Nonetheless, it was medical assistance, crisis intervention, and emergency relief that had the greatest impact, reaching thousands of the sick and indigent. While Santos was sometimes criticized for his conservatism on social issues and his business acumen, his vision and altruism were instrumental in the success of Caritas Manila, widely considered his most noteworthy accomplishment.

=== Birth centennial ===
The CBCP announced that Cardinal Gaudencio Rosales would lead the August 26, 2008, centennial rites for Santos at his hometown's Immaculate Conception Parish Church in Sto. Nino, Guagua. Gloria Macapagal Arroyo led the event by unveiling a historical marker and a 6 ft (1.8 m) statue of Santos (sculpted by Edillardo Paras), donated by Cesar L. Villanueva's wife, Arlyn Sicangco-Villanueva, president of Holy Angel University in Angeles City. The rites also included the exhibit of Cardinal Santos memorabilia, loaned by the Archdiocese of Manila and the Kapampangan Museum at Clark. The bronze statue sits atop a 7 ft (2.1 m) concrete pedestal outside the Rufino J. Cardinal Santos Convention Hall adjacent to the parish church. Villanueva also presented the President with a copy of the book "Padre Pinong, the First Filipino Cardinal" authored by Francis Musni.

On September 3, 2018, his 45th death anniversary, a Mass and the ceremonial tradition of the raising of the galero were officiated by then-Archbishop of Manila, Cardinal Luis Antonio Tagle, to commemorate Santos's legacy and prepare for the 60th anniversary of the renovation of the post-war Manila Cathedral.

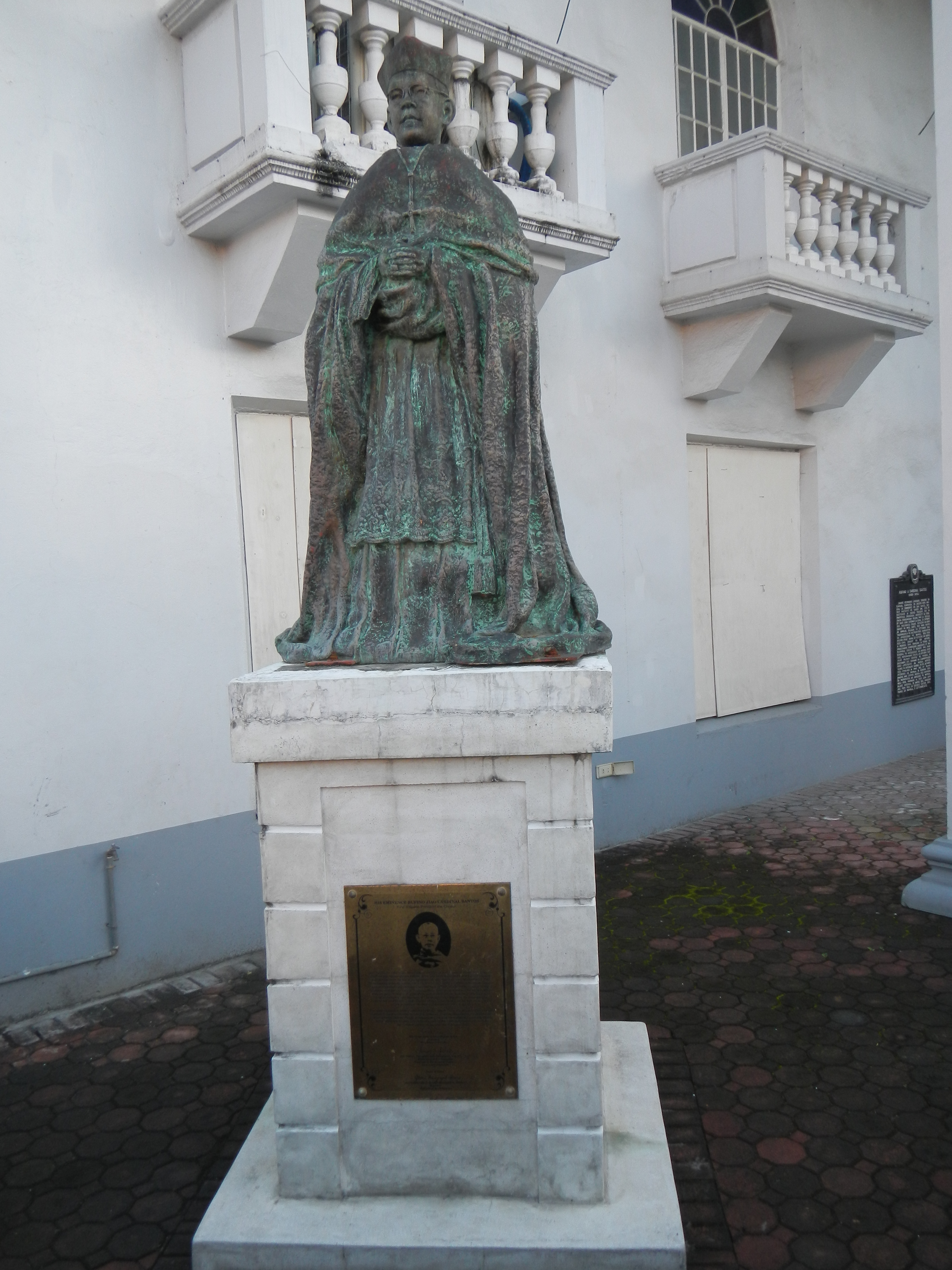
Monument of Rufino Cardinal Santos (Guagua, Pampanga).

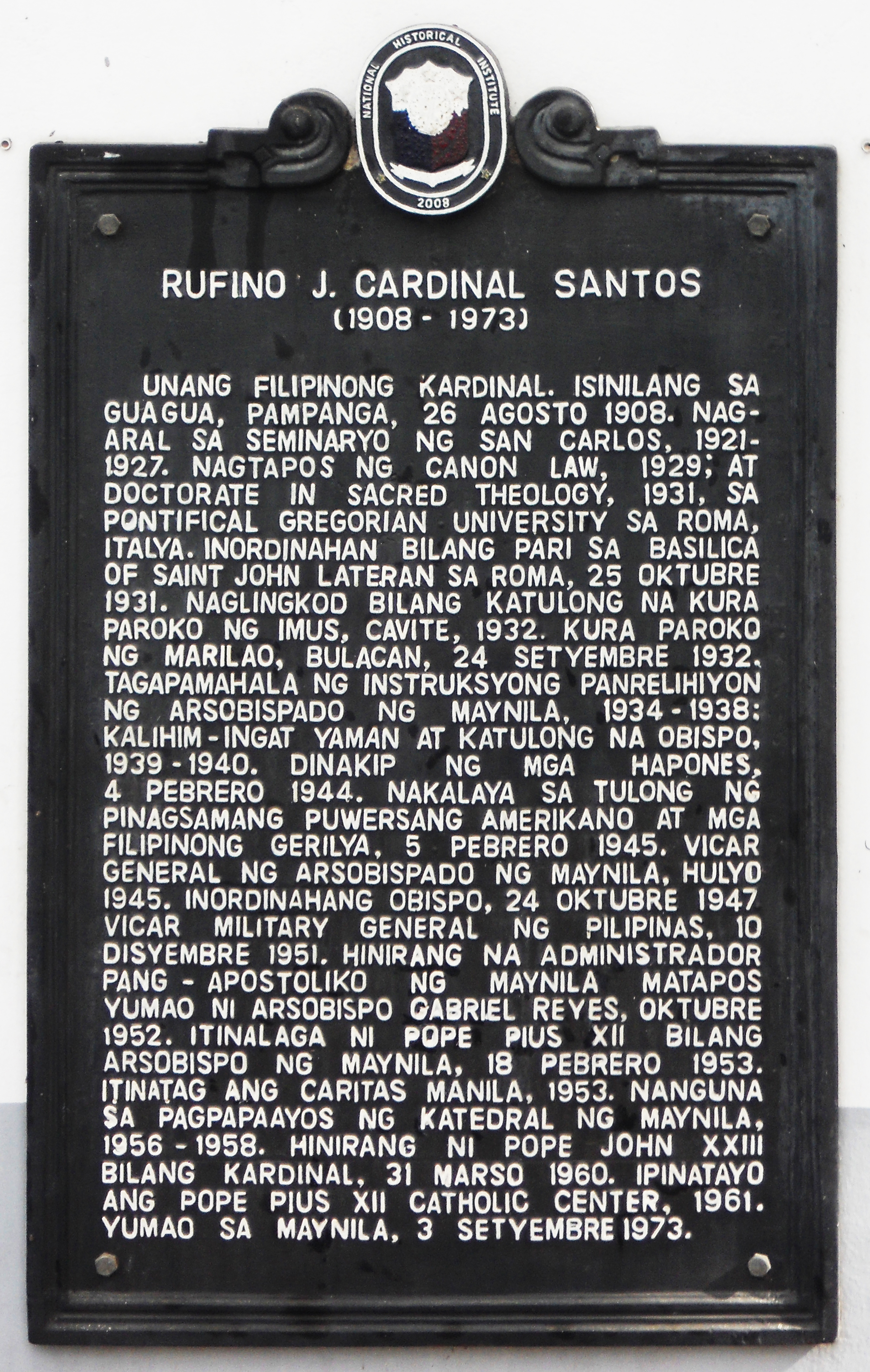
Cardinal Santos Historical Marker

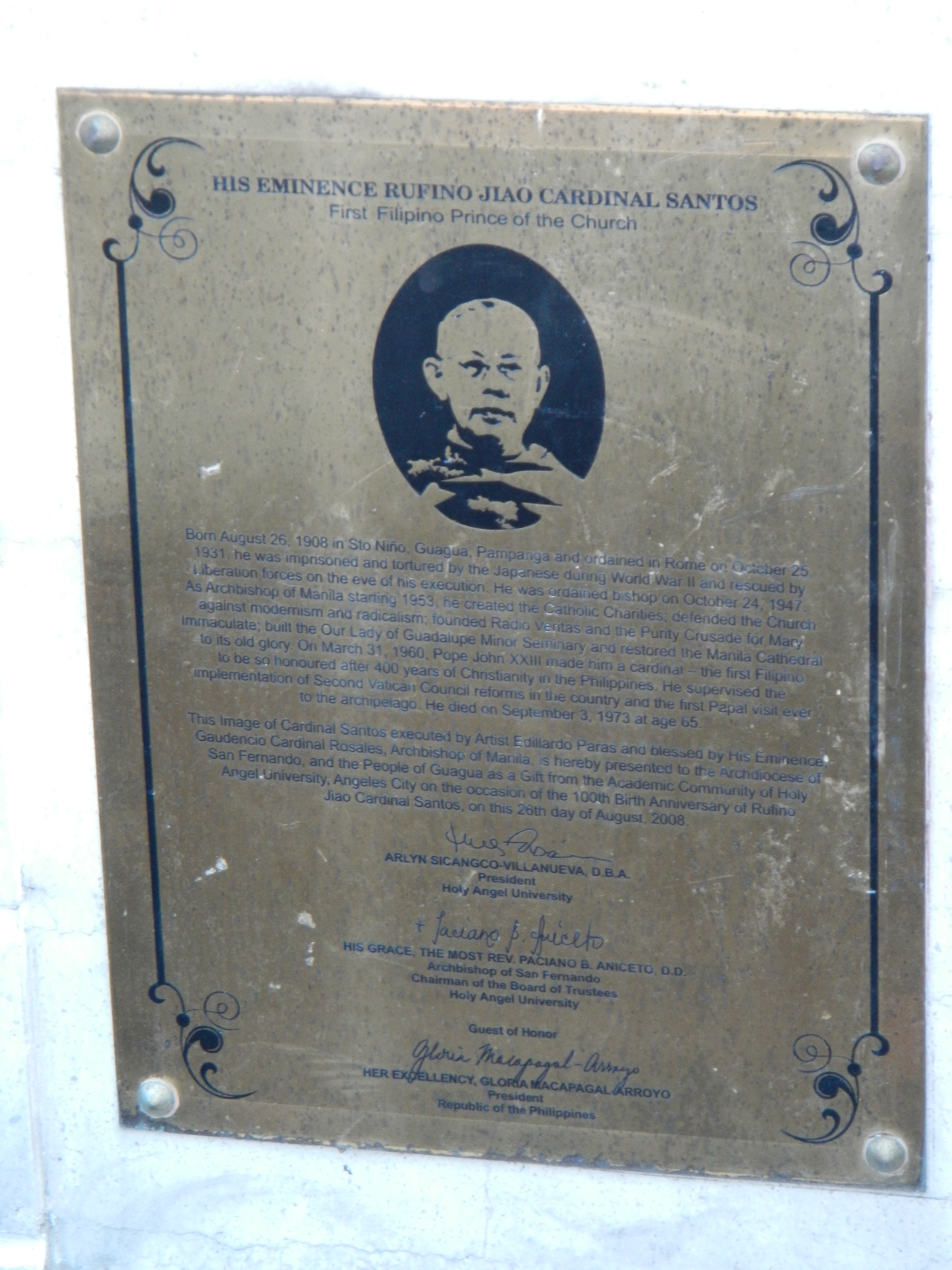
Marker (in Capt. Ruben P. Sonco Freedom Square).

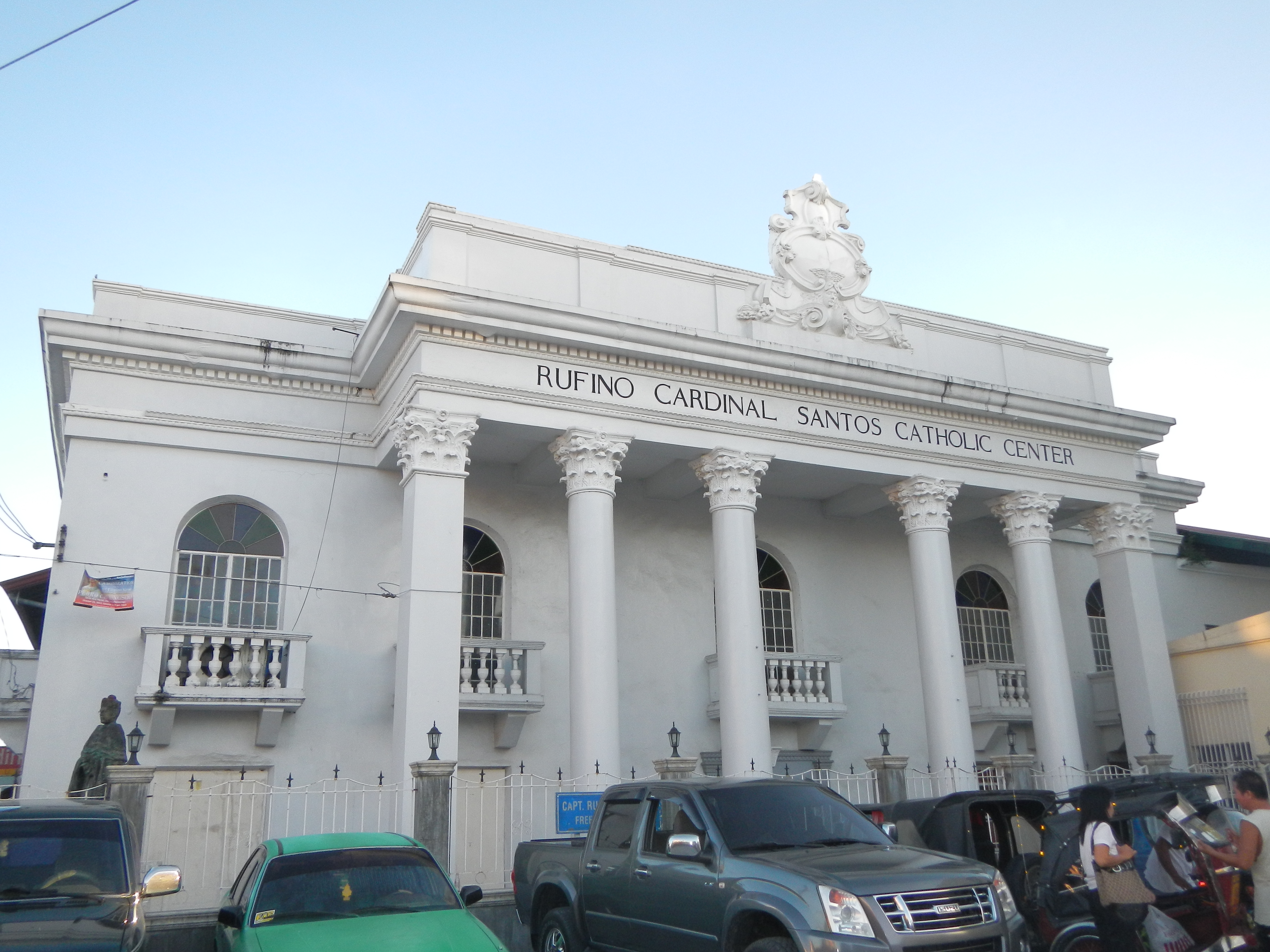
Rufino Cardinal Santos Catholic Center

== See also ==
- Jose Maria Delgado, first ambassador of the Philippines to the Vatican

== Notes ==
Catholic Church titles
New title	Archdiocese of Manila Military Ordinary; 1951–1973	Succeeded by Mariano Gaviola
Preceded by Gabriel Reyes	Archbishop of Manila; 1953–1973	Succeeded by Jaime Sin
New title	Cardinal-priest of Santa Maria ai Monti; 1960–1973	Succeeded by Jaime Sin
