= Antonio C. Delgado =

Filipino businessman and diplomat

Philippines Ambassador to the Vatican
- In office 1982–1988

Personal details
- Born: December 21, 1917 San Pablo, Laguna, Philippine Islands
- Died: December 7, 1992 (aged 74) Makati, Philippines
- Education: University of Santo Tomas (BS)

Antonio Concepcion Delgado (December 21, 1917 – December 7, 1992) was a Filipino industrialist and civic leader who served as the Philippine Ambassador to the Vatican and acting president of the Philippine Chamber of Industries.

== Early life ==
Antonio Delgado was born in San Pablo, Laguna, and was the fourth of eight children of physician Jose Maria Delgado (the first Philippine ambassador to the Vatican) and Felisa Concepcion.

Delgado graduated as valedictorian from San Beda College in 1933 and received his Bachelor of Science in Mining Engineering, magna cum laude, from the University of Santo Tomas in 1937. He served in the Philippine Army and was a guerrilla fighter during World War II. In 1945, he married Nellie Chuidian, and they had four children: Jose Roberto, Lolita, Jose Antonio, and Jose Eduardo.

On July 28, 1963, Jose Antonio died along with the rest of the Philippine contingent to the 11th World Scout Jamboree in Marathon, Greece, 19 other Boy Scouts, three Scoutmasters, and a Chaplain, when their plane crashed in the Indian Ocean off the coast of Bombay, India. His parents established the Jose Antonio Delgado Memorial Foundation, Inc., known as the Ala-Ala Foundation, with the insurance money.

== Business ==
In 1946, Delgado founded ACD, Inc., and in 1949, he established Delgado Brothers, Inc., which became the largest fully integrated transportation company in the Philippines. He founded nine other companies:

- Caltex Floating Station (CFS)
- Delgado Stevedoring (DelSteve)
- Delgado Overland Corporation (DelLand)
- Delgado Brokerage Corporation (DelBroCO)
- Delgado Air Cargo (DelAir)
- Delgado Shipyard Corporation (DelYard)
- United Services Corporation (DelTrade)
- Wood-Mosaic (Phil), Inc.
- Delgado Brothers Hotel Corporation, (DBHC) which owned the Manila Hilton. It was the first 5-star hotel in the Philippines and the tallest building in the country from the late 1960s into the 1970s.

In the 1950s, Delgado became director of the Private Development Corporation of the Philippines (PDCP), Meralco, First United Bank and the Philippine Radio Educational and Information Center (Radio Veritas).

In the 1960s, Delgado was elected to the Philippine Chamber of Industries as President, to the Industrial Finance Committee as Chairman and to the Chamber of Commerce as a Member.

== Recognitions ==
Delgado received awards from various organizations:

- Silver Buffalo Award, Boy Scouts of America, 1970
- Bronze Wolf Award, World Organization of the Scout Movement, 1971, conferred at the 22nd World Scout Conference in Otaniemi, Finland
- Golden Pheasant Award, Scout Association of Japan, 1973
- Silver Tamaraw for Scouting volunteers, Boy Scouts of the Philippines
- Silver Fir Medal of Merit, Boy Scouts of Austria
- Bronze Usa and Gold Medal of Merit, Boy Scouts of the Philippines
- Presidential Gold Plaque, for services rendered for the 10th World Scout Jamboree
- Knight of the Equestrian Order of the Holy Sepulchre of Jerusalem
- Grand Cross "Pro Melitense," Sovereign Military Order of Malta
- Pilgrim Medal (Jerusalem) of Pope Leo XII
- Doctorate in Canon Law and Civil Law, Honoris Causa, Pontifical Lateran University

== Scouting ==
At 15 years old, Delgado was a member of the Boy Scouts of the Philippines contingent to the 4th World Scout Jamboree in Gödöllő, Hungary in 1933. Thirty-five years later, he became President of the Boy Scouts of the Philippines. At the 1971 World Scout Conference in Tokyo, Japan, he became the first Asian to be elected Chairman of the World Scout Committee.

The Boy Scouts of the Philippines state that Delgado conceived the World Scout Emblem as the first Asian World Scout Committee Chairman (from 1971 to 1973). However, the design was introduced at the 8th World Scout Jamboree in 1955, based on a 1939 earlier design by J. S. Wilson.

His son, industrialist Jose Eduardo Delgado, was a member of the National Executive Board of the Boy Scouts of the Philippines.

== Faith ==
Antonio Delgado served as Philippine Ambassador to the Holy See from 1975 to 1982, just as his father, Jose Maria Delgado, did from 1957 to 1961. Delgado searched for a possible first Filipino Saint. He believed in the cause of Lorenzo Ruiz, who was executed in Japan in the 17th century and worked for the beatification of Ruiz and his companions by Pope John Paul II in Manila on February 18, 1981. This was the first time in centuries that such rites were held outside Rome. Delgado retired in 1982 and subsequently served as Ambassador of the Sovereign Military Order of Malta to the Philippines from 1982 to 1988. He authored The Making of the First Filipino Saint in 1982, which was published in 1987. Delgado commissioned the Vatican Mosaic Studio to create an image of Saint Lorenzo Ruiz that is now installed at the Altar of the Martyrdom, St. Peter's Basilica in the Vatican.

== Death ==
Delgado died December 7, 1992, of natural causes at home in Makati, Metro Manila, 14 days before his 75th birthday.
