= Embassy of the Philippines, Holy See =

Diplomatic mission of the Philippines to the Holy See

Embassy of the Philippines to the Holy See Pasuguan ng Pilipinas sa Banal na Luklukan Legatio Philippinarum ad Sanctam Sedem Ambasciata delle Filippine presso la Santa Sede

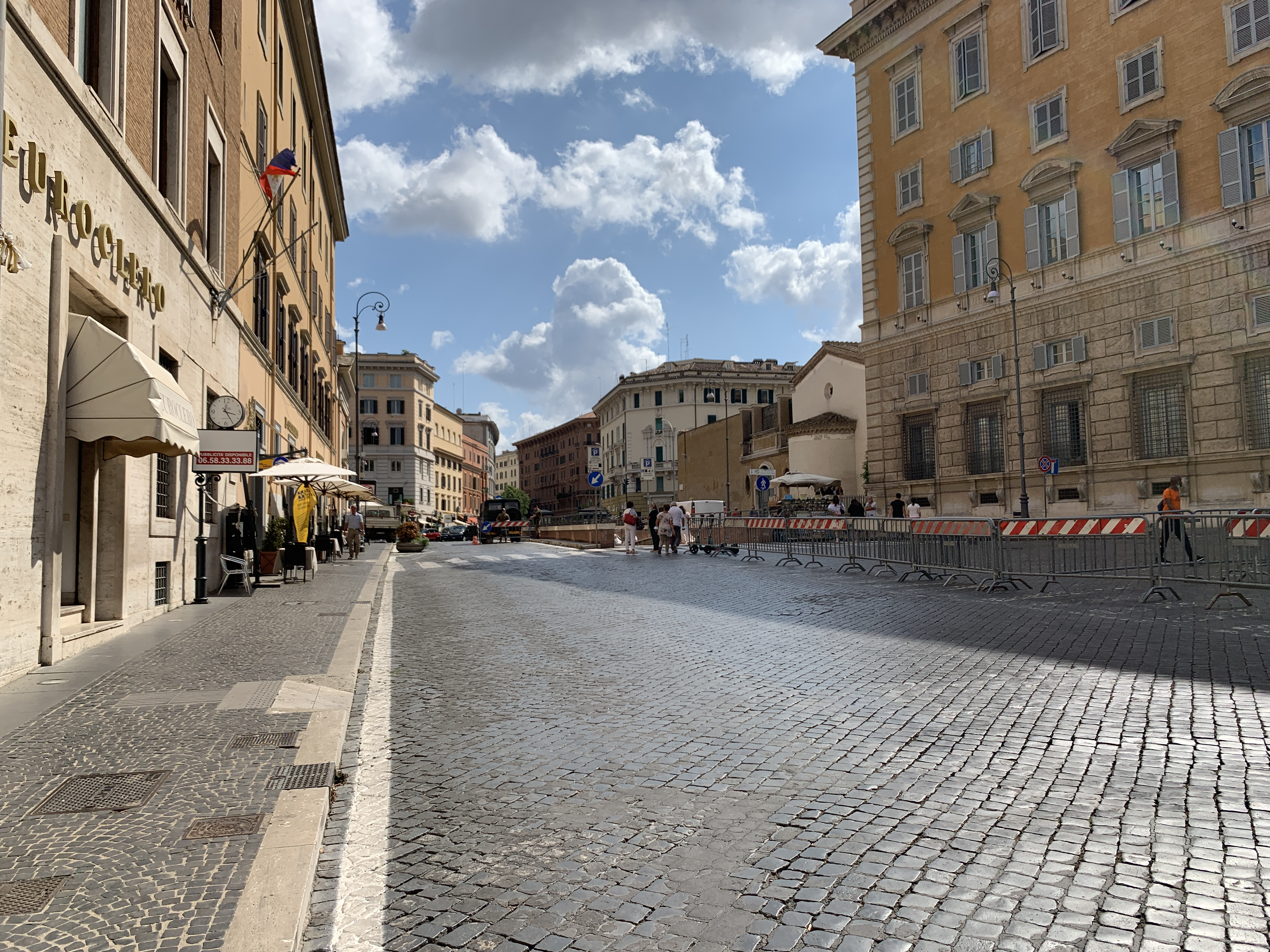
- Location: Rome (Italy)
- Address: Via Paolo VI, 29
- Coordinates: 41°54′3.7″N 12°27′24.8″E
- Ambassador: Raphael Perpetuo M. Lotilla
- Website: vaticanpe.dfa.gov.ph

The Embassy of the Philippines to the Holy See is the diplomatic mission of the Republic of the Philippines to the Holy See, the central government of Vatican City and the Roman Catholic Church. Opened in 1957, it is located along Via Paolo VI in the rione of Borgo, part of Municipio I in central Rome along the border between Italy and Vatican City, and across from St. Peter's Square.

It is distinct from the larger Embassy of the Philippines in Rome, the Philippines' diplomatic mission to Italy.

== History ==
Although diplomatic relations between the Philippines and the Holy See were established on April 8, 1951, the Philippines did not immediately open a separate mission to the Holy See. While a mission had been planned since at least 1949, on January 5, 1951 President Elpidio Quirino signed Executive Order No. 351, placing the Holy See under the jurisdiction of the Philippine Embassy in Madrid. Manuel Moran, who was the Philippines' first ambassador to Spain, was accredited on June 4, 1951 as the country's first ambassador to the Holy See.

Quirino's successor, Ramon Magsaysay, would attempt to establish a separate embassy, with Moran continuing to serve as ambassador to the Holy See even though his term as ambassador to Spain ended in 1953. Financial difficulties, however, prevented the setup of an actual chancery as the Senate refused to approve in 1955 a $24,000 (equivalent to $231,861 in 2020) budget allocation for an embassy to the Holy See; the bulk of the allocation intended for the Holy See instead went to establishing the future embassy in Cairo, which Magsaysay's budget originally did not ask for.

A resident embassy was only established in 1957 during the presidency of Carlos P. Garcia, Magsaysay's successor and a strong supporter of an embassy to the Holy See, despite Congress only granting the mission a budgetary allocation of $9,410 (equivalent to $86,708 in 2020) instead of the $33,000 (equivalent to $304,077 in 2020) originally requested. José María Delgado, a former Grand Knight of the Knights of Columbus and one of four candidates who Magsaysay had considered for ambassador, would become the first resident ambassador to the Holy See. Delgado would later depart Manila to assume his post on August 16, 1957.

== Staff and activities ==
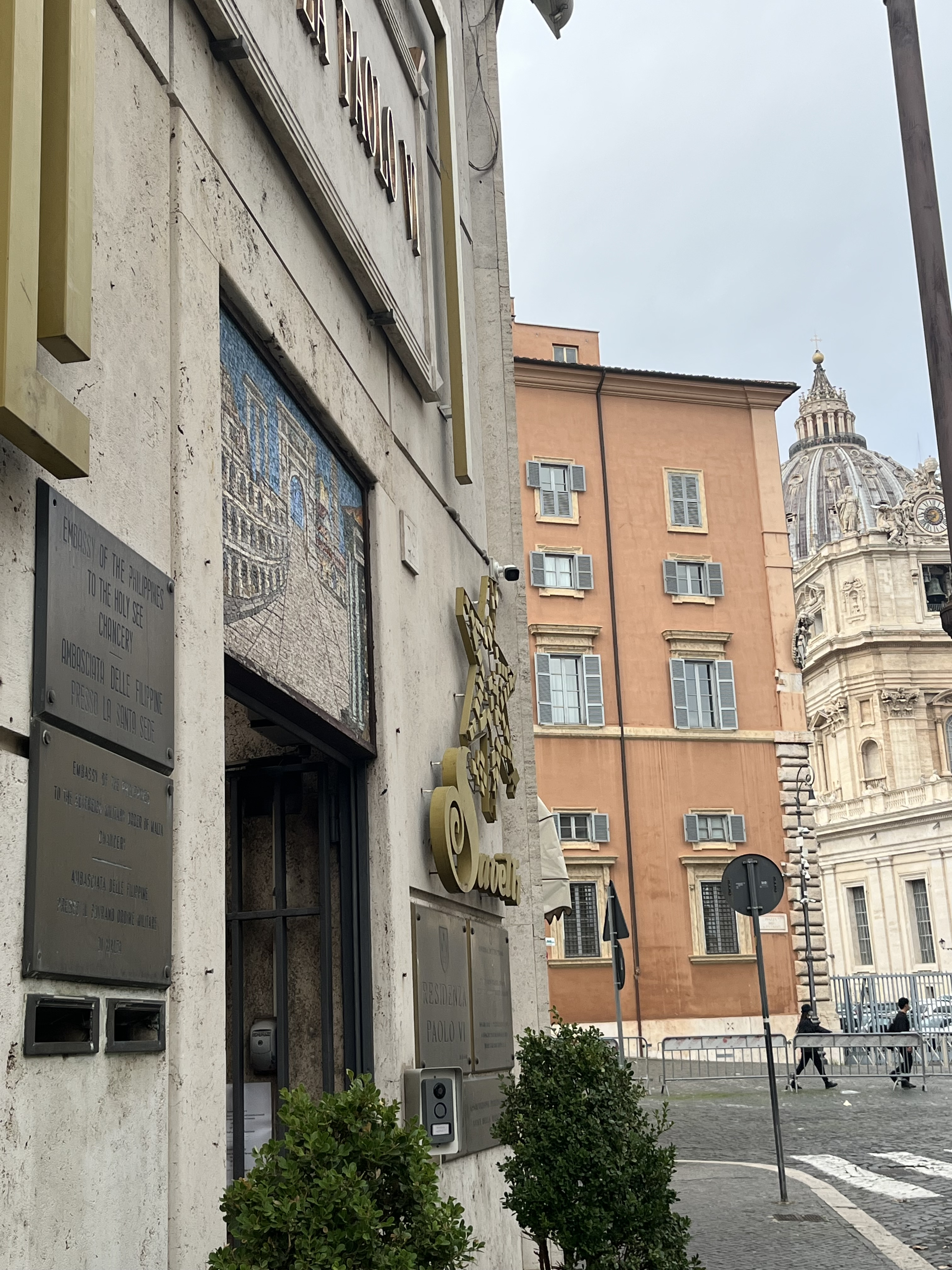
Entrance to the embassy together with the dome of St. Peter's Basilica

The Philippine Embassy to the Holy See is headed by Ambassador Raphael Perpetuo M. Lotilla, who was appointed to the position by President Bongbong Marcos on February 27, 2026. Prior to his appointment as ambassador, Lotilla, a lawyer and businessman by profession, served as Secretary of the Department of Environment and Natural Resources. His appointment was confirmed by the Commission on Appointments on March 11, 2026, and he presented his credentials to Pope Leo XIV on July 1, 2026.

Notable diplomats who have been deployed to the embassy as ambassadors to the Holy See include Mercedes Arrastia-Tuason, whose husband is the cousin of First Gentleman Jose Miguel Arroyo, Henrietta de Villa, co-founder of the Parish Pastoral Council for Responsible Voting, and Cristina Ponce Enrile, wife of Juan Ponce Enrile. Ambassadors to the Holy See have traditionally been political appointees, with the first career diplomat, Grace R. Princesa, only having been appointed to the ambassadorship in 2018.

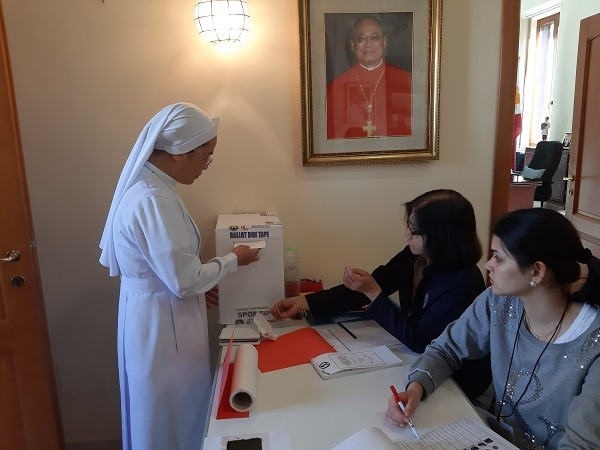
A nun voting at the embassy during the 2019 general election

The Philippines is one of the world's largest Catholic countries, and as such this informs the embassy's functions and activities: during her ambassadorship, Princesa outlined the embassy's work as being a ministry "of presence, smile [sic] and good examples". Its offices are kept busy year-round by the many requests for assistance from Filipino pilgrims to Catholic pilgrimage sites in both Italy and the Vatican, and its consular section, separate from that of the Philippine Embassy in Rome which caters to the broader population of Filipino Italians, serves the more than 3,000 Filipino religious serving in Italy, even maintaining a separate polling center exclusive to them during elections. Its cultural activities are similarly informed by the Catholic faith, including organizing the first Filipino nativity scene at St. Peter's Square, and arranging a visit to Santa Pudenziana for the Holy See's diplomatic corps and the Filipino community in Italy, although some of its activities, such as erecting a statue of José Rizal at Piazzale Manila in Rome, are secular in nature. The embassy likewise works closely with the Pontificio Collegio Filippino, where some of its events are held, and it also exercises jurisdiction over the Philippines' relationship with the Sovereign Military Order of Malta.

Of all the embassies in Rome, the Philippine Embassy to the Holy See is the mission located closest to St. Peter's Square. It has used this to its advantage: during de Villa's ambassadorship, its restrooms were opened on Wednesdays, the day of the weekly Papal Audience, to Filipino pilgrims visiting the Vatican, and staff members would arrange stacks of rosaries brought by Overseas Filipino Workers by the windows so that they would be "blessed by the Pope" as he was speaking to the crowds at St. Peter's Square.

== See also ==
- Holy See–Philippines relations
- List of diplomatic missions of the Philippines
- Apostolic Nunciature to the Philippines
- Catholic Church in the Philippines
