= Cardinal Santos Medical Center =

- Colinas Verdes Hospital Managers Corporation

Geography
- Location: San Juan, Metro Manila, Philippines
- Coordinates: 14°35′51.4″N 121°02′45.3″E

Organization
- Care system: Private
- Religious affiliation: Roman Catholic (Archdiocese of Manila)

Services
- Emergency department: Yes
- Beds: 300

History
- Former name: Cardinal Santos Memorial Hospital (1974–1988)
- Opened: August 15, 1974; 52 years ago

Links
- Website: cardinalsantos.com.ph
- Lists: Hospitals in the Philippines

The Cardinal Santos Medical Center (CSMC) is a hospital in San Juan, Metro Manila, Philippines.

== History ==
=== St. Paul's Hospital ===
The Cardinal Santos Medical Center (CSMC) traces its roots to the St. Paul's Hospital of Manila which was established by the Maryknoll Sisters. The hospital was destroyed during the Battle of Manila of 1945 during World War II.

=== Establishment ===
The CSMC considers August 15, 1974 as its foundation date. The Roman Catholic Archdiocese of Manila (RCAM) led by Cardinal Rufino Santos offered financial support for the reconstruction of the hospital. Santos died in 1973, with the rebuilt hospital inaugurated in 1974 as Cardinal Santos Memorial Hospital to commemorate the clergyman.

=== Under HMI (1988–2008) ===
The hospital became the Cardinal Santos Medical Center (CSMC) on August 1, 1988 with the Hospital Managers, Inc. (HMI) taking over the hospital. While the property the CSMC stands on remained under the ownership of RCAM, HMI was tasked to operate the institution until July 31, 2008.

=== Under MPIC (since 2008) ===
The Medical Doctors Inc. (MDI) took over the CSMC in August 2008 as the RCAM looks for a long term operator for the hospital. The MDI is also the owner and operator of Makati Medical Center. The Metro Pacific Investments Corporation (MPIC) is already a partial owner of MDI at the time with 33 percent stake.

The Colinas Verdes Hospital Managers Corp. (CVHMC), a subsidiary of MDI was named operator of the CSMC starting from March 1, 2009 for a period of 20 years.

The MPIC initiated a full acquisition of CVHMC which was completed in November 2011.

== Facilities ==
The CSMC has a bed-capacity of 300.
