= Jeremiah James Harty =

Roman Catholic archbishop (1853–1927)

His Excellency, The Most Reverend Jeremiah James Harty
- Archbishop-Bishop of Omaha
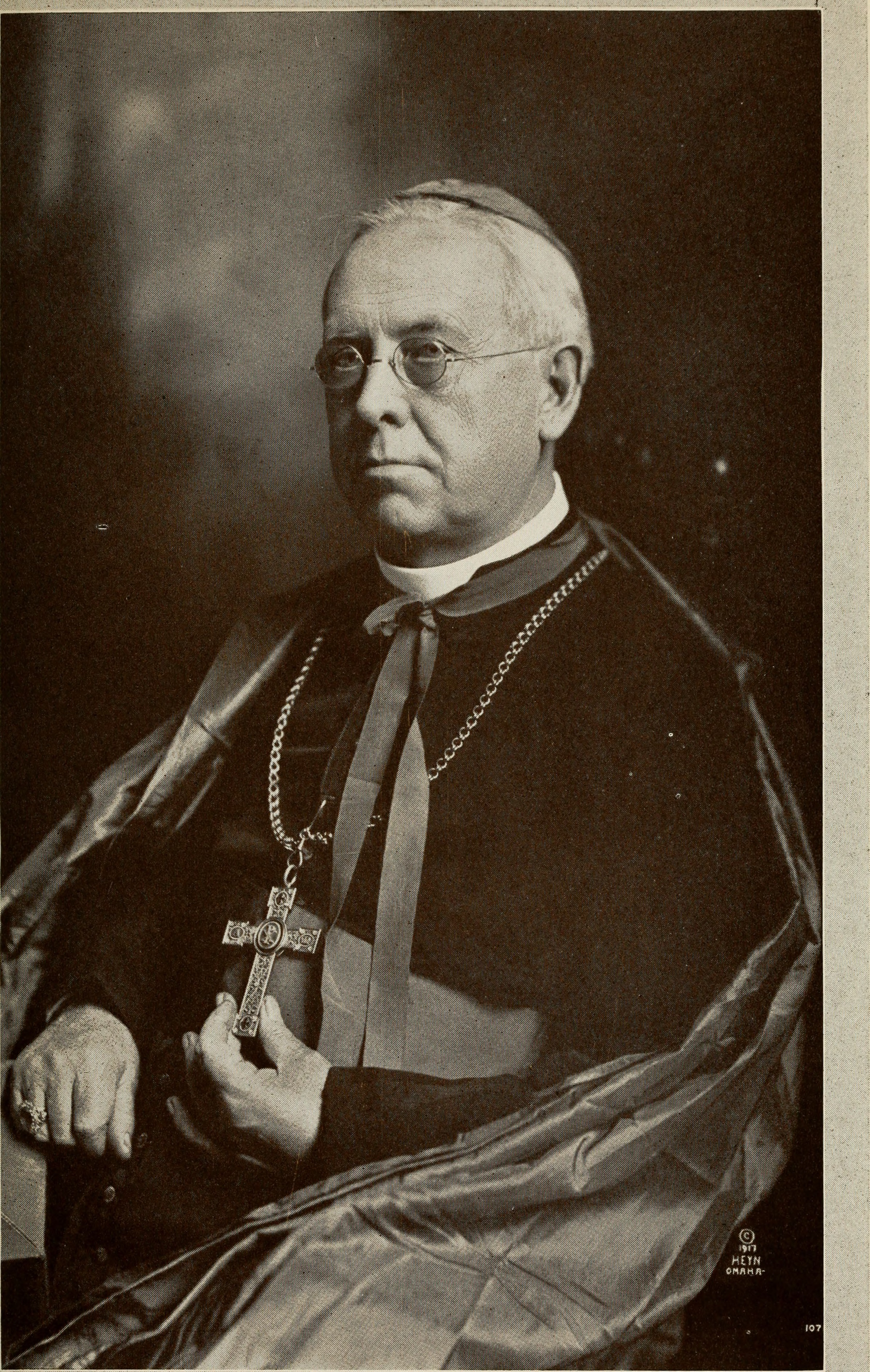
- Harty, c. 1917
- See: Diocese of Omaha
- Installed: May 16, 1916
- Term ended: October 29, 1927
- Predecessor: Richard Scannell
- Successor: Joseph Rummel
- Other post: Archbishop of Manila (1903–1916)

Orders
- Ordination: April 28, 1878
- Consecration: August 15, 1903 by Francesco Satolli

Personal details
- Born: November 5, 1853 St. Louis, Missouri, US
- Died: October 29, 1927 (aged 73) Los Angeles, California
- Denomination: Catholic Church
- Motto: Pax (Peace)
- Coat of arms

Jeremiah James Harty (November 5, 1853 – October 29, 1927) was an American prelate of the Catholic Church. He served as the 26th archbishop of the Archdiocese of Manila in the Philippines from 1903 to 1916. He later served as bishop (with the personal title of archbishop known as archbishop ad personam) of the Diocese of Omaha in Nebraska from 1916 until he died in 1927.

== Biography ==
=== Early life ===
Jeremiah Harty was born in St. Louis, Missouri, to Andrew and Julia (née Murphy) Harty, who were Irish immigrants. He was educated by the Christian Brothers in grade school and by the Jesuits in high school. He attended St. Louis University, from where he graduated in 1872. He studied theology at St. Vincent's College in Cape Girardeau.

=== Priesthood ===
Harty was ordained to the priesthood for the Archdiocese of St. Louis by Archbishop Patrick Ryan on April 28, 1878. His first assignment was as assistant pastor of St. Lawrence O'Toole Parish in St. Louis. He then served a pastoral role at St. Bridget Parish, where he remained until he became the founding pastor of St. Leo Parish in 1888.

=== Archbishop of Manila ===
On June 6, 1903, Harty was appointed Archbishop of Manila by Pope Leo XIII. He was the first American to be named to that position. He received his episcopal consecration on August 15, 1903, in Rome from Cardinal Francesco Satolli, with Archbishops Diomede Panici and Amilcare Tonietti serving as co-consecrators, in Rome.

During his term, Harty was increasingly troubled by the propagation of the Protestant faith in the Philippines, which was being introduced by the Thomasites, and was gaining a foothold among Filipinos because of the strong anti-friar sentiments that existed at that time. Due to the lack of Catholic educational institutions in the country, Harty, an alumnus of a Christian Brother school in St. Louis, Missouri, appealed to the Superior-General of the Institute of the Brothers of the Christian Schools in 1905 for the establishment of a De La Salle school in the Philippines. However, Harty's request was denied due to lack of funds. Nonetheless, Harty continued to appeal for the establishment of additional Catholic schools in the country to Pope Pius X including, among others, St. Theresa's College Manila. On March 10, 1911, the La Salle Generalate sent Brothers Blimond Pierre, Aloysius Gonzaga, and Augusto Correge to the Philippines, where they established De La Salle College in Paco, the first Christian Brother school in the country.

=== Bishop of Omaha ===
On May 16, 1916, Harty was appointed bishop of what was then the Diocese of Omaha with the personal title of archbishop. He filled the vacancy of Bishop Richard Scannell, who died on January 8, 1916. In 1917, Harty expressed skepticism of Father Edward J. Flanagan and his establishment of Boys Town, a home for troubled boys in Boys Town, Nebraska. However, Harty would later endorse the goals of Boys Town. The actor Minor Watson portrayed the Bishop of Omaha in the 1938 film Boys Town.

On October 29, 1927, Jeremiah Harty died at age 73.

Catholic Church titles
Preceded by Bernardino Nozaleda y Villa	Archbishop of Manila; 1903–1916	Succeeded by Michael J. O'Doherty
Preceded by Richard Scannell	Archbishop of Omaha; 1916–1927	Succeeded by Joseph Francis Rummel
