= Andrés Ferrero =

Spanish Catholic prelate

His Excellency Andrés Ferrero y Malo de San José
- Bishop of Jaro, Philippines
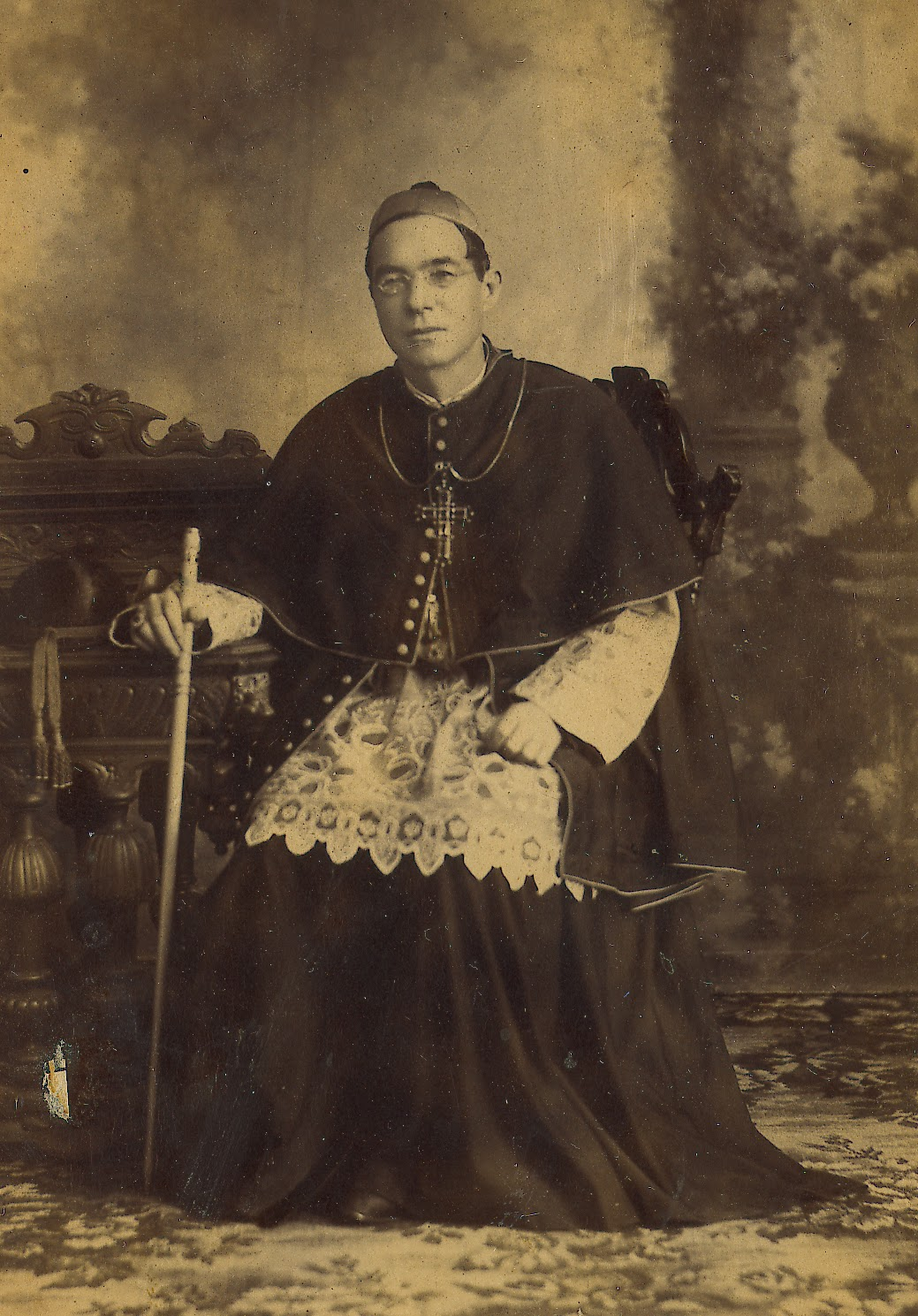
- Appointed: 24 March 1898
- Predecessor: Leandro Arrúe Agudo, O.A.R.
- Successor: Frederick Z. Rooker
- Previous posts: Professor of Philosophy, Dogmatic Theology, and Moral Theology at the Augustinian Recollects Seminaries in Monteagudo and Marcilla, Navarre (1869–1873); Parish Priest of Pontevedra, Negros Occidental (1875–1882, 1888–1894, 1897-1896); Prior of the Recoletos in Intramuros (1882–1885); Vicar Provincial from 5 September 1885 and Provincial Council (1885–1888), St. Nicolas Province of the Order of Augustinian Recollects; Prior Provincial ad triennium (1894–1897), St. Nicolas Province.

Orders
- Ordination: 18 December 1869
- Consecration: 13 November 1898 by: Consecrator: Archbishop Bernardino Nozaleda y Villa, O.P., Archdiocese of Manila; Co-consecrators: Bishop Bernabé García Cezón, O.P., Titular Bishop of Byblus

Personal details
- Born: Andrés Ferrero y Malo de San José; 30 November 1846 Arnedo, La Rioja, Spain
- Died: 22 December 1909 (aged 63) Marcilla, Navarre, Spain
- Denomination: Roman Catholic
- Motto: Tu vero vigila in omnibus labora (2 Tim 4:5)
- Coat of arms

Andrés Ferrero y Malo de San José, O.A.R. (1846-1909), was an Augustinian Recollect, who became the third Bishop of Jaro, Philippines, from 24 March 1898 to 27 October 1903.

== Formation and Priestly Ministry ==
Portrait of Andrés Ferrero (1895), by Francisco Martínez Lorenzo, a Spanish-Manilan painter. Church of Santa Eulalia, Arnedo

Styles of Andrés Ferrero y Malo de San José, O.A.R.
- Reference style: His Excellency
- Spoken style: Your Excellency
- Religious style: Bishop

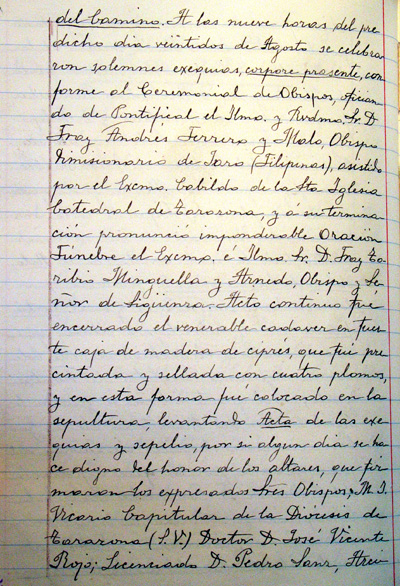
Register (dated 22 August 1906) of the solemn Pontifical Mass in the Convent of the Augustinian Recollects in Marcilla, Navarre, Spain, which was presided by Bishop Andrés Ferrero for the funeral of his batch mate and future saint, Bishop Ezequiél Moreno y Díaz.

Andrés Ferrero was born in Arnedo, La Rioja, Spain, on 30 November 1846. He took his monastic vow as an Augustinian Recollect in Order's Novitiate House at the Shrine of Nuestra Señora del Camino of Monteagudo (Navarre), in 1865. and received the ordination to the priesthood four years later, on 18 December 1869. He was in the batch of St. Ezequiél Moreno.

After his ordination, Fray Ferrero as appointed professor in the Recollect's formation house in Monteagudo, teaching philosophy, dogma, and moral theology. Later, he also taught in the Order's Seminary in Marcilla, Navarre. Four years later, he was sent to the Philippines. Arriving in June 1873, his first mission was to become the Superior of San Sebastian Convent in Manila.

In order to prepare him to the mission of evangelizing the natives of Visayas, he was later sent to Panglao, Bohol to study the local languages. Fray Ferrero spent most of his time in preaching the Catholic faith to the people of Pontevedra, Negros Occidental, where he was assigned three times (1875–1882, 1888–1894, 1897–1896), dedicating a total of fourteen years in this parish Negros. In Pontevedra, he constructed the church and its rectory, as well as the cemetery. In between these terms as parish priest in Negros, Fray Ferrero was chosen for other responsibilities in the St. Nicolas Province of his Order, serving as Prior of the Recoletos in Intramuros (1882–1885), Vicar Provincial from 5 September 1885 and Provincial Council (1885–1888). He was also elected as Prior Provincial ad triennium (1894–1897) by the Recoletos Provincincial Chapter of 1894.

== Ministry as Bishop of Jaro ==
Fray Andrés Ferrero was appointed Bishop of Jaro at the onset of the Spanish–American War. He was appointed by Pope Leo XIII, on 24 March 1898. However, he was not consecrated (in Manila) until 13 November of that year. By that time Manila already fell into the hands of the Americans, and Governor-General Diego de los Ríos already transferred the Spanish Capital to Iloilo City, where Philippine Revolution has already reached full-blown. He was only able to take canonical possession of his diocese in September 1900 amidst another revolution against the American occupation of the Islands. His diocese was undergoing critical times, and the local Church was maligned by adversaries, especially by schismatic clergy. To defend the Church, he urged his priests to keep the faith through their blameless conduct and discipline, and through helping the faithful maintain the religion and piety. He also made effort to reopen St. Vincent Ferrer Seminary for the training of future clergy of Jaro in 1902, when order was reestablished after the two revolutions.

== Last Years ==
The change of political sovereignty in the Philippines forced Bishop Ferrero to resign from his Episcopal See, on 12 June 1903, leaving his beloved flock in Panay and Negros with a heavy heart. In October 1903, traveled back to Spain. He was the last Spanish bishop of the Patronato real regime to leave the Philippines. He opted to spend the remaining years of his life in the Augustinian Recollect convent in Marcilla, Navarre, refusing any other Episcopal See offered to him. Until the last, his wish was to be reunited with the Church in the Diocese of Jaro. Bishop Andrés Ferrero died in Spain, on 22 December 1909, at the age of 63, without having seen his wish fulfilled.

Three years prior to his death, on 22 August 1906, Bishop Ferrero presided at the solemn Pontifical Mass for the funeral of his batch mate and future saint, Ezequiél Moreno y Díaz, Bishop of Pasto, Colombia.

Catholic Church titles
Preceded by Leandro Arrúe Agudo, O.A.R.	Bishop of Jaro; 24 March 1898 – 12 June 1903	Succeeded by Frederick Z. Rooker
