= Frederick Z. Rooker =

American Bishop

His Excellency Frederick Z. Rooker
- Bishop of Jaro
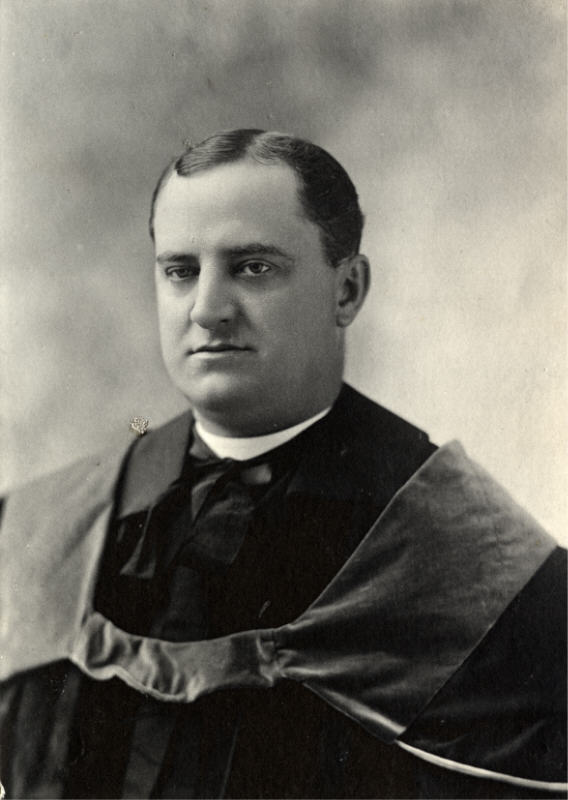
- Appointed: June 12, 1903
- Predecessor: Andrés Ferrero y Malo de San José, O.A.R.
- Successor: Dennis Joseph Dougherty
- Previous posts: Vice Rector of the Pontifical North American College (1889-1894); Secretary of the Apostolic Delegate to the United States of America (1895-1903); Lecturer, Catholic University of America(1895-1903)

Orders
- Ordination: July 25, 1888
- Consecration: June 14, 1903 by: Consecrator: Sebastiano Cardinal Martinelli, O.E.S.A, Cardinal-Priest of the Basilica of Sant'Agostino, Rome; Co-consecrators: Archbishop Nicola Giuseppe (Nicolae Iosif) Camilli, O.F.M. Conv. (Titular Archbishop of Constantia in Scythia); Bishop Raffaele Virili (Titular Bishop of Troas)

Personal details
- Born: Frederick Zadok Rooker; September 19, 1861 New York City, United States
- Died: September 18, 1907 (aged 45) Jaro, Iloilo City
- Buried: Jaro Cathedral
- Denomination: Roman Catholic
- Education: Union College; Pontifical North American College; Collegium Urbanum
- Motto: Veritatis liberabit vos
- Coat of arms

Styles of Frederick Zadok Rooker
- Reference style: His Excellency
- Spoken style: Your Excellency
- Religious style: Bishop

Frederick Zadok Rooker (1861 – 1907) was an American Catholic prelate who served as the first Bishop of Jaro from 12 June 1903 until his death on 18 September 1907.

== Biography ==
=== Early life and education ===
Rooker was born in New York City, on 19 September 1861, son of New York Tribune editor Myron Holley Rooker, who married Margaret Coleman. As a boy, he attended public school in Albany, New York. Later, he studied civil engineering and Latin at the Union College in Schenectady, New York.

At the end of his junior year studies, Frederick went to Rome to pursue formation for ordination to the priesthood at the Collegium Urbanum, which is under the immediate direction of the Propaganda Fidei (now called Congregation for the Evangelization of Peoples). From this institution he finished his doctoral degrees in Philosophy and in Theology, and was ordained a priest, on 25 July 1888.

=== Early priesthood ===
From 1889 to 1894, he served as Vice Rector of the North American College. Rooker returned to the United States of America in 1895 to work as secretary of the Apostolic Delegation in Washington, D.C. At the same time, he was selected to be the lecturer in Ethics at the newly established Social Sciences Faculty of the Catholic University of America. He held these posts until his appointment as Bishop of Jaro.

In 1901, Rooker was made a Personal Chamberlain of the Pope, advancing his title to Monsignor.

=== Episcopate ===
Rooker was appointed Bishop of Jaro, on 12 June 1903. He was consecrated by Sebastiano Cardinal Martinelli, O.E.S.A, Cardinal-Priest of the Basilica of Sant'Agostino, Rome and who was his former Superior at the Apostolic Delegation in Washington, D.C., on 14 June 1903. His Principal Co-Consecrators were Archbishop Nicola Giuseppe (Nicolae Iosif) Camilli, O.F.M. Conv. (Titular Archbishop of Constantia in Scythia) and Bishop Raffaele Virili (Titular Bishop of Troas).

==== Bishop of Jaro ====
Among the first acts of Rooker as Bishop of Jaro was to reorganize St. Vincent Ferrer Seminary after the Filipino-American War. With his help, the seminary went back to normal life at the beginning of the School Year 1904–1905, this time under the American flag. At the start of the School Year 1906–1907, the enrollment was more than six hundred students.

The Bishop also invited the Sisters of St. Paul of Chartres to serve in his Diocese, which included at that time half of the States of Visayas and of Mindanao. This Congregation developed a chain of Universities in the Philippines, which became known for training nurses. On 29 October 1904, seven sisters from Vietnam arrived to establish the first Saint Paul's school in the Philippines in Dumaguete.

The Bishop from New York also fought hard to regain the properties of the Catholic Church in his Diocese and, at one time, going to the extent of forcing the Municipal President of the town of Dumangas to hand over the keys of the old Spanish Church sequestered by the local government for use of the Aglipayans. The news that Rooker would celebrate Mass in the church the next Sunday generated some rumors of the Aglipayan threat to drive a herd of carabaos into the church during the service. Hearing this, the Americans volunteered to accompany the Bishop, who dared to celebrate the Mass with a revolver beside him on his episcopal throne. No carabao turned out and, since then, the old Spanish Church was reopened for Catholic worship service.

==== Last years ====
Another important act that Rooker accomplished as Bishop of Jaro was the immediate rebuilding of St. Vincent Ferrer Seminary after it was reduced into heaps of ashes by a fire from a candle, which was carelessly left burning in the sacristy, on 7 October 1906. The Bishop began the work of reconstruction two months after the fire. Through the financial support of the priests and the faithful of the Diocese, as well as of Rooker's many friends in America, and through a substantial financial aid from Pope Pius X, three fifths of the building was completed in less than a year. The space was already sufficient to house one hundred interns that, by 17 September 1907, a solemn inauguration of the new building was done.

The day after, on 18 September 1907, Rooker was stricken by heart attack and died hours later. His mortal remains were not brought back to his home country and were buried in Jaro Cathedral.

Catholic Church titles
Preceded by Andrés Ferrero y Malo de San José, O.A.R.	Bishop of Jaro; June 12, 1903–September 18, 1907	Succeeded by Dennis Joseph Dougherty
