= Gabriel Reyes =

Filipino Roman Catholic archbishop (1892–1952)

The Most Reverend Gabriel M. Reyes
- Archbishop of Manila
- Archbishop Gabriel M. Reyes
- Province: Manila
- See: Manila
- Appointed: October 14, 1949
- Term ended: October 10, 1952
- Predecessor: Michael J. O'Doherty
- Successor: Rufino Jiao Santos
- Previous post: Roman Catholic Archdiocese of Cebu (1934–1949)

Orders
- Ordination: March 27, 1915 by Dennis Joseph Dougherty
- Consecration: October 11, 1932 by Guglielmo Piani

Personal details
- Born: Gabriel Reyes y Martelino; March 24, 1892 Kalibo, Capiz, Captaincy General of the Philippines
- Died: October 10, 1952 (aged 60) Washington, D.C., United States
- Buried: Manila Cathedral crypt
- Denomination: Roman Catholic
- Education: St. Vincent Ferrer Seminary
- Motto: Stet Et Pascat (Ever watchful, ever caring.)
- Coat of arms

Gabriel Martelino Reyes (March 24, 1892 – October 10, 1952) was the 28th Archbishop of Manila, and the first native Filipino to hold that post. He previously served as Archbishop of Cebu from 1934 to 1949, and then served as Archbishop of Manila from 1949 until his death in 1952.

== Biography and Early Ministry ==
Gabriel M. Reyes was born on March 24, 1892, in Kalibo, Capiz. He entered St. Vincent Ferrer Seminary in Jaro, Iloilo at the age of 13, during the time of Bishop Frederick Rooker. He was ordained a priest on March 27, 1915, by Jaro Bishop Dennis Joseph Dougherty. After ordination, he was immediately appointed coadjutor parish priest, and later Parish Priest of the Jaro Cathedral.

A few months later Gabriel was sent to a very challenging mission to Balasan, Iloilo, the farthest town of Iloilo up north. As the parish priest of this town, he covered sixteen small islands with neither roads, chapels nor convents but only ruins amidst an increasing number of Aglipayan and Protestant churches. In 1918, he was transferred to be the parish priest of Capiz, Capiz. On July 20, 1920, he was chosen as the diocesan chancellor and secretary by the new bishop of Jaro, Msgr. James McClosky. He was also the parish priest of Santa Barbara, Iloilo.

In 1927, he was named the vicar general of Jaro, serving until his appointment to the episcopacy.

== Episcopacy ==
In 1932, Pope Pius XI appointed Reyes as Bishop of Cebu. He received his episcopal consecration in the Cathedral of Jaro, on October 11, 1932, from the Apostolic Delegate, Archbishop Guglielmo Piani, with Bishop McClosky and Lipa Bishop Alfredo Verzosa, as co-consecrators. Two days after, he was installed in Cebu.

On April 28, 1934, after more than three centuries, the Diocese of Cebu was elevated by Pope Pius XI into an archdiocese, with Reyes as the first archbishop. In Cebu Mons. Reyes ordained every year dozens of new candidates to the priesthood. He established the Parishes of Guadalupe, Tabuelan, Simala and Santa Lucia to add to the existing parishes, and launched an evangelization program. He also started the “Catholic Hour” over radio station DZRC, established parochial schools, and organized the Cebu archdiocesan officer newspaper Diaro-Kabuhi Sang Banua..

During World War II, Archbishop Reyes nearly lost his life after he demurred with the orders of the Japanese forces to collaborate with them. He was also placed under strict surveillance. Years later, as the Americans started to bomb Cebu City, he received reports that the Japanese plans to take him hostage, and thus he left the Archbishop's Palace minutes before his captors arrived. After the liberation of Cebu, he was feared to be killed by the Japanese, but eventually he came out from hiding and led the rebuilding of churches, schools, hospitals, and seminaries damaged by the war. It was in this context that he renovated the Cebu Cathedral, which had been bombed during World War II.

On August 25, 1949, he was appointed by Pope Pius XII as coadjutor to Manila Archbishop Michael J. O'Doherty with right of succession. On the death of the Archbishop on September 29, 1949, he took over the archiepiscopal See of Manila, being its first Filipino archbishop.

On October 14, 1949, he was installed as Archbishop of Manila and took canonical possession of this See of Manila.

As archbishop of Manila, he oversaw the construction of the new campus of San Carlos Seminary in Makati in 1951. A Catholic center he wished to build when he became archbishop of Manila was built by his successor, the Pope Pius XII Catholic Center, on U.N. Avenue in Manila.

== Death and Legacy ==
Reyes fell ill and died at the age of 60 on October 10, 1952, in Georgetown University Hospital in Washington, D.C.

He was the immediate predecessor of two Filipino prelates who became cardinals: Julio Rosales, who succeeded him in Cebu, and Rufino Santos, who succeeded him in Manila.

The Archbishop Gabriel M. Reyes Memorial Library (AGRM Library), the resource center of the Pastoral Formation Complex of San Carlos Seminary was dedicated in his honor.

In his hometown of Kalibo, a monument was erected at his birthplace, and the street fronting it was named after him. In December 2015, the monument was transferred to Pastrana Park, and was formally turned over by the Archbishop Gabriel Reyes Memorial Foundation to the local government of Kalibo on October 10, 2016, his 64th death anniversary and the foundation's 39th anniversary.

Archbishop Reyes Avenue in Cebu City is also named for him, the thoroughfare traversing Barangay Camputhaw to the junction of Barangay Kasambagan, Lahug and Barrio Luz.

Catholic Church titles
Preceded by Juan Bautista Gorordo	Archbishop of Cebu; 1932–1949	Succeeded by Julio Rosales y Ras
Preceded by Michael J. O'Doherty	Archbishop of Manila; 1949–1952	Succeeded by Rufino Jiao Santos
