= Montefranco =

- Comune
- Comune di Montefranco
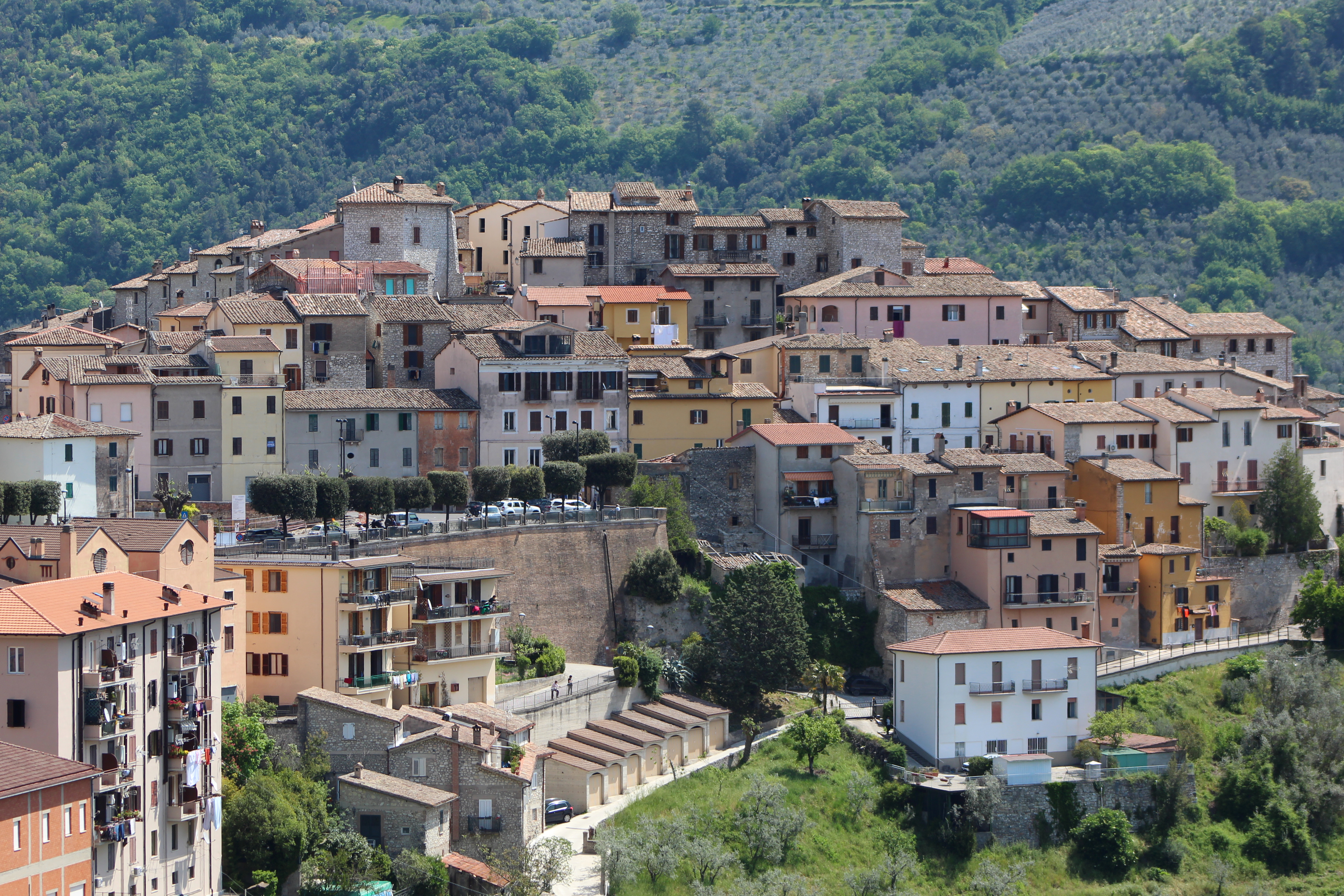
- Hilltop view of Montefranco, with houses rising above the surrounding countryside

- Location within Italy Location within Umbria
- Coordinates: 42.597075°N 12.7663°E
- Country: Italy
- Region: Umbria
- Province: Province of Terni (TR)

Area
  - Total: 10.1 km^{2} (3.9 sq mi)
- Elevation: 375 m (1,230 ft)

Population (1 January 2025)
  - Total: 1,304
  - Density: 129/km^{2} (334/sq mi)
- Time zone: UTC+1 (CET)
  - Summer (DST): UTC+2 (CEST)
- Postal code: 05030
- Dialing code: 0744

Montefranco is a comune (municipality) in the Province of Terni in the Italian region Umbria, located about 70 km southeast of Perugia and about 10 km northeast of Terni. As of 2021, Montefranco had a population of 1,255 inhabitants.

== Etymology ==
According to the 19th-century account of Adone Palmieri, the commune was formerly known as Bufechia or Bufone. After resisting the arms of Spoleto, it was granted exemption from certain tribute payments by the Dukes of Spoleto. In 1290 it is said to have taken the name Montefranco, a reference to the "franchigie" (franchise, in the sense of permission or privilege) it enjoyed thereafter.

== History ==
Montefranco was founded in 1228, when inhabitants of Arrone fled the Valnerina to escape the rule of Rainald of Urslingen, who had been ruling on behalf of Emperor Frederick II. They settled on Colle Bufone and established a new fortified community. On 7 September 1228 the new settlement formally submitted to Spoleto, and the town thereafter remained under Spoletan control for centuries. The settlers agreed to pay an annual tribute of 26 lucchesi for each household to Spoleto.

In 1258 statutes were granted to the community, a step toward local autonomy. Despite this, Montefranco's strategic position in the Valnerina continued to expose it to regional rivalries. In 1498 troops from Terni attacked the town, but the intervention of Spoleto led to the repulsion of the assailants. In 1522 Montefranco participated in the broader revolt of the castles of the Valnerina against Spoleto.

During the pontificate of Pope Paul V in the early 17th century, Montefranco was detached from Spoleto's jurisdiction. This separation proved temporary, as in 1622 Pope Urban VIII reunited it to Spoleto.

In 1798 the town was united to the Canton of Terni during the period of French-influenced Roman Republic. After the Restoration, in 1816 it was placed under the district government of Spoleto, but in 1817 it was transferred to the district of Terni. In 1827 it fell under the jurisdiction of a podestà based in Terni, within the Delegation of Spoleto and Rieti.

In 1859, Montefranco had a population of 1,228 inhabitants. In 1860, following the unification of central Italy, Montefranco became an autonomous municipality within the Kingdom of Italy.

== Geography ==
Montefranco stands at approximately 9 miles (14 km) from Terni, on a rocky height surrounded by olive groves. The River Nera flows less than 0.5 miles (0.80 km) from the town at the foot of the mountain. The municipality of Arrone lies about 1 mile (1.6 km) away.

Montefranco borders the following municipalities: Arrone, Ferentillo, Spoleto, Terni.

=== Subdivisions ===
The municipality includes the localities of Capitignano, Casa Cantoniera, Fontechiaruccia, I Monti, Montefranco, Varcone.

In 2021, 223 people lived in rural dispersed dwellings not assigned to any named locality. At the time, the most populous localities were Fontechiaruccia (483), and Montefranco proper (467).

== Economy ==
In the mid-19th century, the local economy was based primarily on agriculture, especially olive cultivation and oil production. Meadows were described as fertile, and grain milling and oil pressing were supported by several mills, including four oil mills and three grain mills. Some inhabitants were engaged in trade, and the town was said to include several families of comfortable means, though not of exceptional wealth.

== Religion and Culture ==
The parish church, equipped with an organ, is dedicated to the Assumption of the Virgin Mary. The principal popular feast was celebrated on 29 April in honor of Saint Peter Martyr. Another feast was held on 20 May for the co-patron Saint Bernardino of Siena.

=== Madonna del Carmine ===
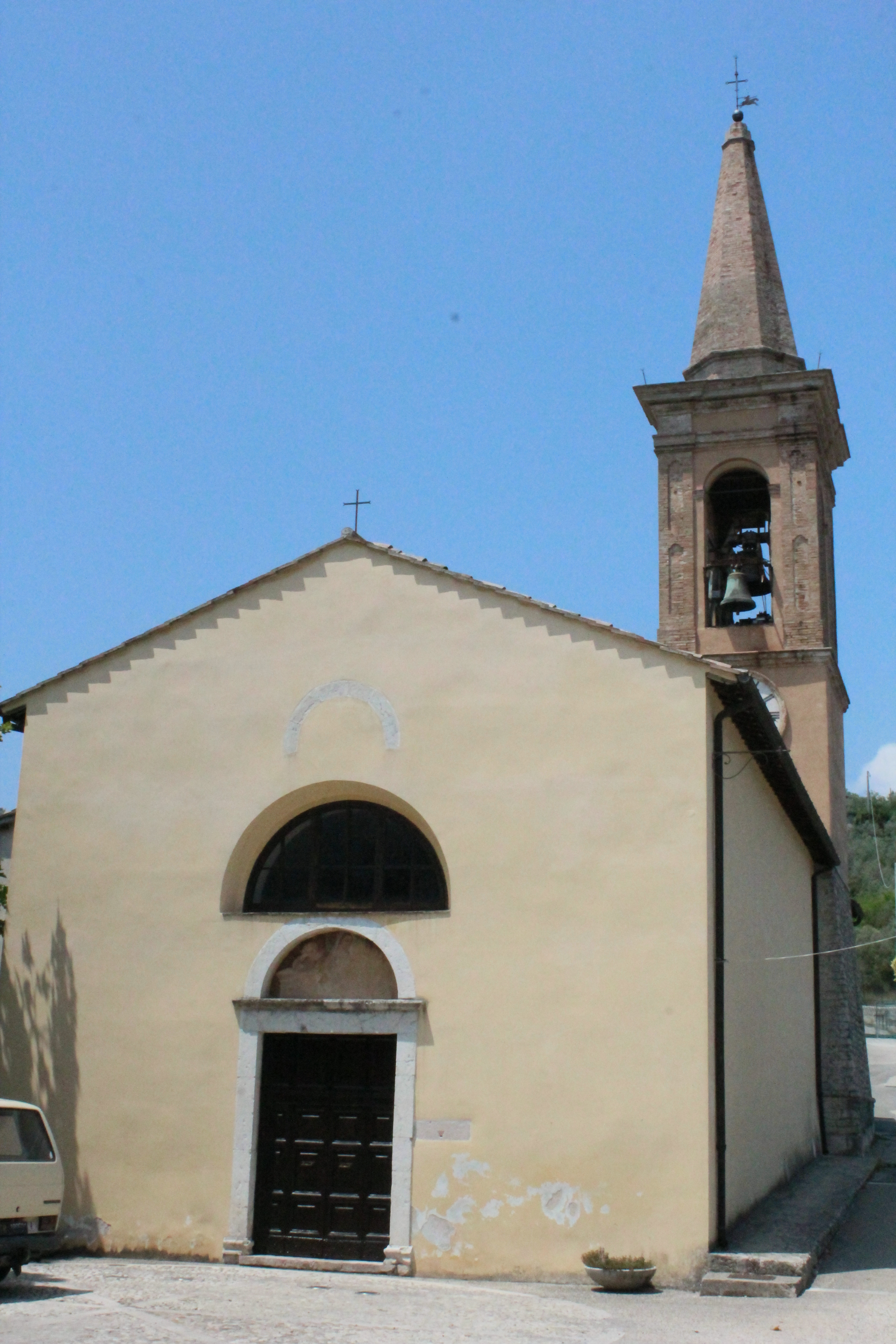
Church of the Madonna del Carmine

The church of the Madonna del Carmine features a bell tower and preserves within it 17th-century frescoes of the Umbrian school, as well as a 16th-century depiction of the Ascension.

=== San Bernardino ===
The church of San Bernardino stands a short distance from the center of Montefranco and was built on the site of an earlier Benedictine oratory. It is dedicated to the town's patron saint, who was present in Montefranco around 1444 for preaching. Constructed in 1454 and later rebuilt, the complex includes two adjoining structures and was associated with a convent of the Observant Friars. Traces of the earlier building phase remain visible on the façade. The interior consists of a single nave with a barrel vault and contains numerous frescoes dating from the 15th to the 16th century, including works attributed to Orlando Merlini.

== Notable people ==
The town is noted as the birthplace of the jurist Marroni, described in the 19th century as one of the foremost legal writers in Italy, and of the philosopher Don Giovanni Candelari. Montefranco produced several prominent medical professionals, including Doctor Moretti, chief physician of Terni, and Doctor Bonanni, chief physician of Narni. Among ecclesiastical figures associated with the town were Don Francesco Maria Micheli, then Auditor of the Apostolic Dataria, and Bernardino da Montefranco, Minister General of the Franciscan Order.
