= José María Delgado =

Filipino diplomat (1887–1978)

Dr. José María Delgado (June 20, 1887, Malolos - December 24, 1978) was the first Philippine Ambassador to the Vatican. He was the cousin of Francisco Afan Delgado, descendant of General Martín Teófilo Delgado.

== Early life ==
Delgado was born on 1887 in the Philippine city of Malolos. He was the fourth child of Juan Fausto Delgado and Eustaquia Salcedo y Concepción. He married Felisa Concepción by whom he has four boys: Jose, Jesus, Francisco, Antonio and four girls: Milagros, Pilar, Filomena, Teresita.

== Career ==
In 1923, he returned to Manila and resumed his practice with old friends and classmates, establishing his own clinic in the city. It was during this period of his life that he began teaching obstetrics, pediatrics and gynecology at the University of Santo Tomas, while lecturing on medical ethics, sociology, anthropology, apologetics and religion. This would be a career path that would continue for 27 years and would earn him the distinction of being the only layman teaching theology.

Delgado was appointed as the first resident ambassador of the Republic of the Philippines to the Holy See in 1957. A post that his son Antonio C. Delgado would also hold. Written about Ambassador Delgado in a special issue of the Manila Chronicle, January 31, 1969 by Francisco De Leon:

“Pope pius XII had assured him that the Philippines would finally get her due recognition with the appointment of the first Filipino cardinal...Pope Pius XII died a few months later. Many Filipinos back home believed that it killed the hope. Ambassador Delgado on his part, knew that the idea did not perish with the death of the pope. The appointment of a Filipino cardinal was a matter of justice. Justice may be delayed but it does not perish...in less than three years of serving as the country's Ambassador to the Vatican, the Philippines finally got her first cardinal with the appointment by Pope John XXIII of Manila archbishop Rufino Jiao Santos.”

In 1966, he authored a book "Fe Y Patria," Discursos, conferencias y articulos.

Among some of the awards received through the life of Dr. José María Delgado:

- Most Outstanding Physician by the Philippine Federation of Private Medical Practitioners
- Medal of Catholic Action of the Philippines, Pope Pius XI (1939)
- Medal of the Pilgrims to Jerusalem
- Papal Knight with decoration “Pro Ecclesia et Pontifice” (1927)
- Knight of the Grand Cross
- Order of Pius IX
- Golden Cross Award by The University of Santo Tomas

When asked about his passions, Dr. Delgado is remembered as saying: “I have three loves in this life, God, Country and Culture. Upon his passing at the age of 91 on December 24, 1978, one might say that his life was an embodiment of these passions.

== See also ==
- Rufino Jiao Santos, First Cardinal of The Republic of The Philippines
- Antonio C. Delgado, Philippine Ambassador to The Vatican
- Lorenzo Ruiz, Filipino Saint
