= Holy See–Philippines relations =

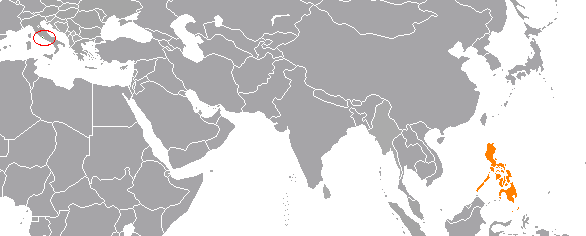

- Holy See: Philippines

Diplomatic mission
- Apostolic Nunciature to the Philippines: Embassy of the Philippines to the Holy See

Envoy
- Apostolic Nuncio Charles John Brown: Ambassador Myla Grace Ragenia C. Macahilig

Holy See–Philippines relations refers to the relations between the Holy See (Vatican City) and the Philippines. As one of two Catholic-majority countries in Asia (the other being Timor-Leste), the Philippines enjoys significant relations with the Holy See. The Holy See has a nunciature in Manila, and the Philippines has an embassy to the Holy See based in Rome.

== History ==
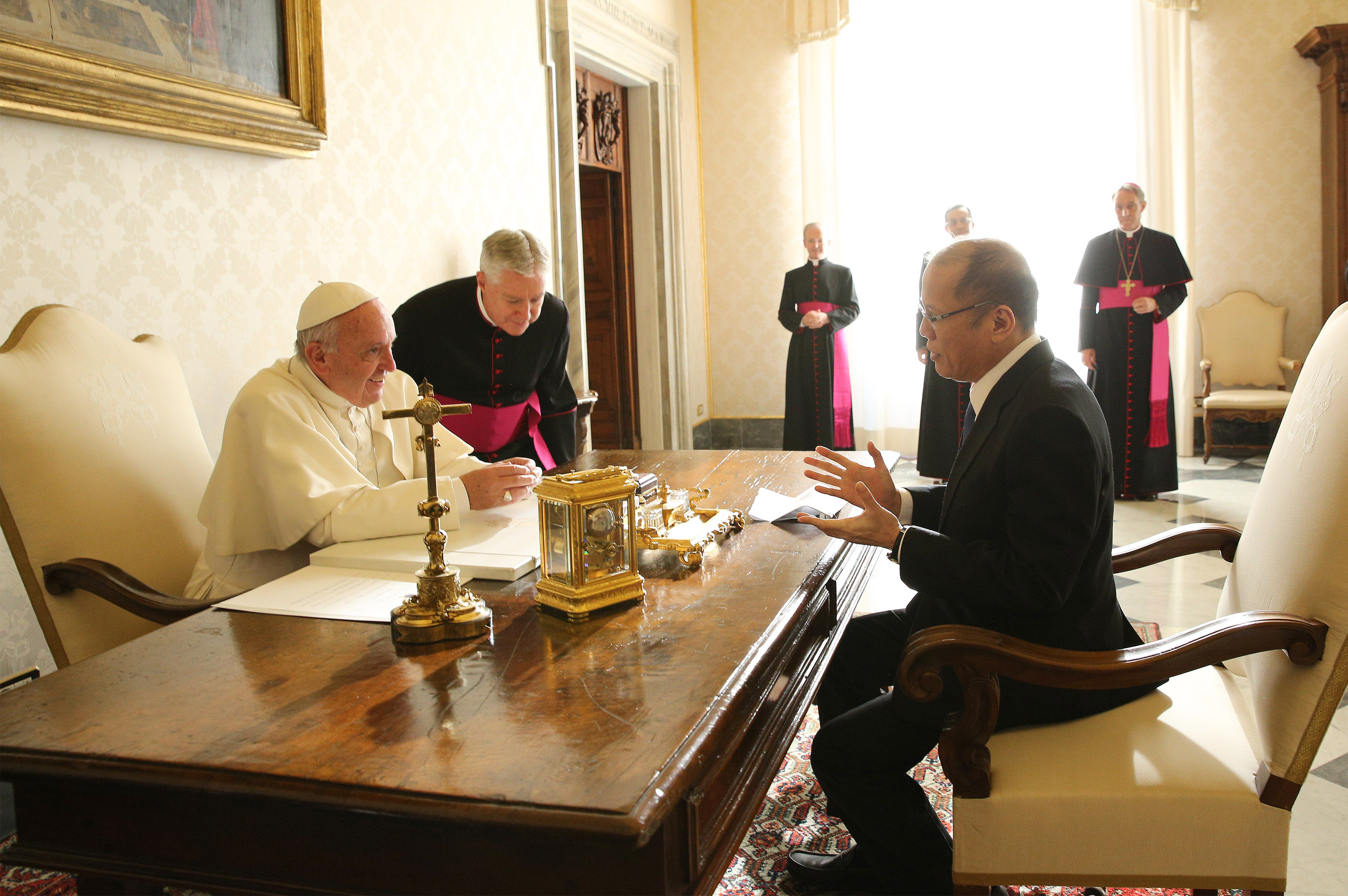
President Benigno Aquino III meets Pope Francis during his state visit to the Vatican in 2015

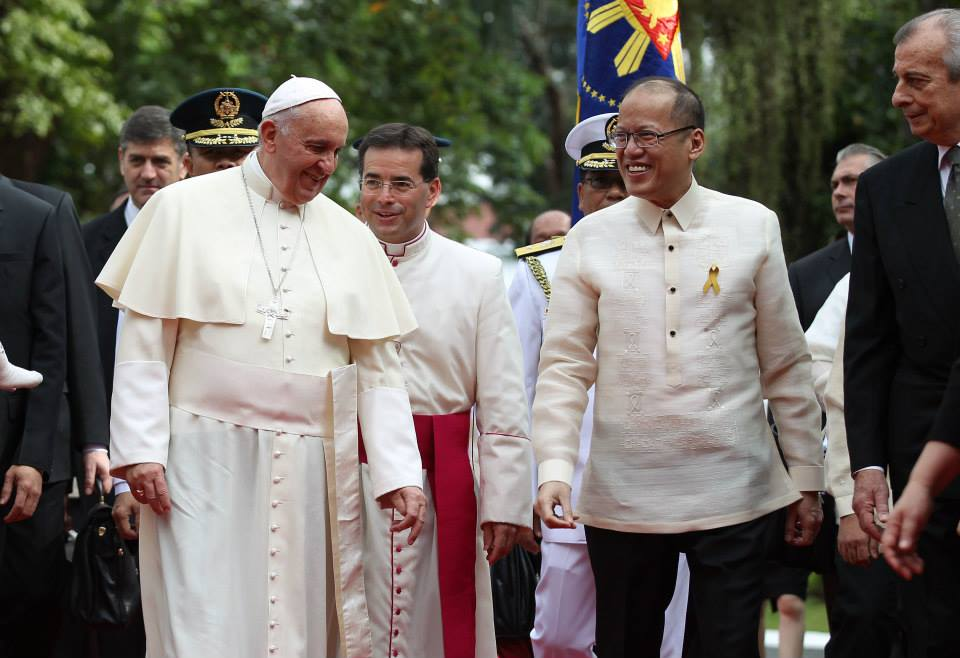
Pope Francis with President Benigno Aquino III during the Pope's visit to the Philippines, January 2015

Catholicism first arrived in the Philippines in the 16th century, with missionaries accompanying conquistadors as they annexed the islands to the Spanish Empire. By the time the Philippines regained sovereignty from the United States following the Second World War with the establishment of the Third Republic, Catholicism had already left a lasting impression on Philippine culture and society with at least seventy percent of Filipinos professing the faith.

During the administration of Philippine President Elpidio Quirino, the Apostolic Delegation of the Philippines was upgraded to a Nunciature, with Archbishop Egidio Vagnozzi becoming the first Apostolic Nuncio on 9 April 1951. The first Philippine Ambassador to the Holy See, Dr Manuel Moran, presented his credentials to Pope Pius XII on 4 June 1951.

Three popes thus far have made pastoral visits to the Philippines. Pope Paul VI visited the Philippines in 1970 and made a speech in front of students at the University of Santo Tomas (UST) in Manila. In 1981, Pope John Paul II also gave a speech at UST, and beatified the 17th century Manila native Lorenzo Ruiz a saint at Luneta Park, the first beatification made outside the Vatican. The pontiff later returned the Philippines in 1995 for the World Youth Day. On January 15–19, 2015, Pope Francis made a papal visit to the Philippines, where he gave a speech at UST and visited Tacloban, the city that was devastated by Typhoon Yolanda (Haiyan).

Three Philippine Presidents received the Pope in the Philippines during the latter's apostolic visit, namely, Ferdinand Marcos (in 1970 and 1981), Fidel V. Ramos (in 1995), and Benigno Aquino III (in 2015). On the other hand, Presidents Elpidio Quirino (in 1951), Diosdado Macapagal (1962), Gloria Macapagal Arroyo (in 2007), and Benigno Aquino III (in 2015), were received by the Pope in private audiences held in Vatican City. Arroyo attended the Funeral of Pope John Paul II in 2005; Marcos Jr. attended the Funeral of Pope Francis in 2025.

The Philippines has hosted the 1937 International Eucharistic Congress (IEC) in Manila and did so again from 25 to 31 January 2016, which was moved from the original May date per request of the Vatican. Archbishop of Cebu José S. Palma of the Catholic Bishops' Conference of the Philippines suggested to the Vatican for Pope Francis to visit the country for the event. However, Palma later confirmed that the pontiff would not visit the country for the event and the Vatican would instead send a papal envoy to participate, saying: "the IEC is the opportunity to give glory to God. Others are saying if the Pope comes people might come because of the Pope but not because of Jesus."

On December 2019, President Rodrigo Duterte conferred upon Archbishop Gabriele Giordano Caccia the Order of Sikatuna, the highest award given by the Philippines to foreign diplomats.

The diplomatic relations between the Holy See and the Philippines celebrated its 75th anniversary on 8 April 2026, with a Solemn Eucharistic Celebration at the Manila Cathedral, presided by the Apostolic Nuncio to the Philippines, Archbishop Charles John Brown, followed by a dinner reception at the Ayuntamiento de Manila. The celebration was graced by members of the Church (cardinals, archbishops and bishops of the Philippines), the diplomatic corps (ambassadors serving in the Philippines), and the Government of the Philippines, led by President Bongbong Marcos.

== See also ==
- Apostolic Nunciature to the Philippines
- Christianity in the Philippines
- Index of Vatican City-related articles
