= Michael J. O'Doherty =

Roman Catholic archbishop

The Most Reverend Michael J. O'Doherty D.D
- Archbishop of Manila
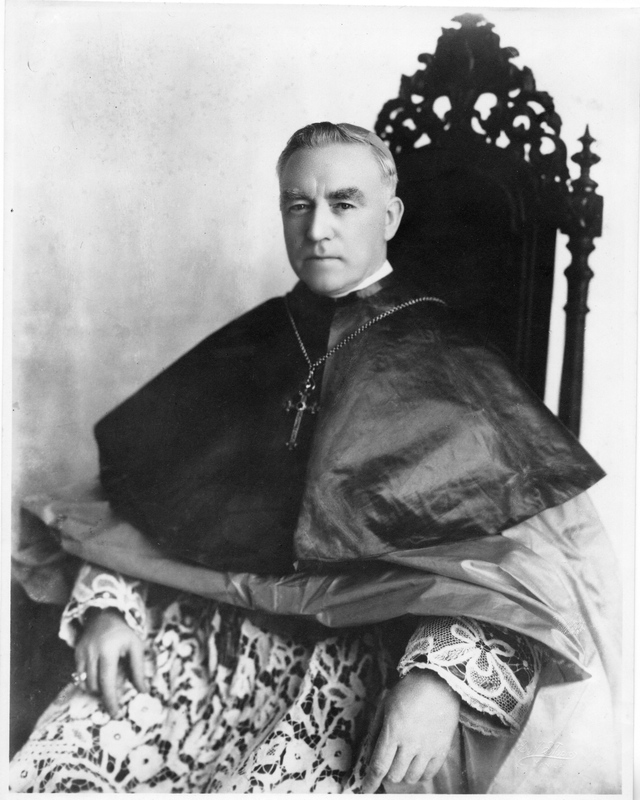
- Archbishop Michael J. O'Doherty, 1940
- Church: Manila Cathedral
- Archdiocese: Manila
- Appointed: 6 September 1916
- Term ended: 13 October 1949
- Predecessor: Jeremiah James Harty
- Successor: Gabriel M. Reyes
- Previous post: Bishop of Zamboanga

Orders
- Ordination: 18 October 1897
- Consecration: 3 September 1911 by John Healy

Personal details
- Born: 30 July 1874 Charlestown, County Mayo, Ireland
- Died: 14 October 1949 (aged 75) Manila, Philippines
- Buried: Manila Cathedral
- Denomination: Roman Catholic
- Parents: Michael J. O'Doherty (father); Julie E. O'Doherty née O'Kelly (mother)
- Education: Philosophy and Theology
- Alma mater: St. Patrick's College, Maynooth; Pontifical University of Salamanca
- Motto: Delectabor in Domino (I will delight in the Lord.)
- Coat of arms

Michael James O'Doherty (30 July 1874 – 14 October 1949) was an Irish prelate and was the 27th Archbishop of Manila in the Philippines. O'Doherty was Archbishop of Manila for 33 years from 1916 until his death in 1949, making him the longest to hold the post, serving through the difficult years of the Japanese occupation and the Second World War.

== Early life ==
Michael James O'Doherty was born in Charlestown, County Mayo, Ireland, on 30 July 1874, to Michael J. and Julie E. O'Doherty née O'Kelly.

== Education ==
He received his early education at St. Nathy's College, in Ballaghaderreen in County Roscommon, before going to Maynooth, Leinster. The brilliant scholar graduated in philosophy and theology from St. Patrick's College, Maynooth. O'Doherty later studied in the Royal College of Science, in Dublin, and the Irish College at Salamanca, in the Kingdom of Spain. In 1896, O'Doherty obtained a Doctor of Divinity degree from the Pontifical University of Salamanca.

== Priesthood ==
At the age of 24, he was ordained on 18 October 1897 and became a priest of the Diocese of Achonry.

In 1897, he became the professor of classics at his alma mater St. Nathy's College. Through his efforts, he elevated the college into one of Ireland's more prominent educational institutions. He served in this role until 1904.

On 22 June 1904, Michael was appointed by the Council of Irish Bishops, as Rector of the Irish College in Salamanca, Spain. Under his leadership, he restored the ancient glory of the school after which he received a knighthood from King Alfonso XIII of Spain, who became his close friend. His reputation as a prominent educator and administrator elevated him in the Catholic hierarchy. He served as Rector of the Irish College until he left for the United States in 1911. His brother Rev. Denis J. O'Doherty would later succeed him as rector of the college.

== Episcopacy ==
O'Doherty soon left the United States for the Philippines. In 1910, Pope Pius X created the Diocese of Zamboanga with jurisdiction over Mindanao, previously under the Dioceses of Cebu and Jaro. On 19 June 1911, O'Doherty was appointed as the first Bishop of Zamboanga, and was consecrated on 3 September 1911 by The Most Rev. John Healy, Archbishop of Tuam.

On 6 September 1916, he became Archbishop of Manila succeeding Archbishop Jeremiah James Harty who returned to the United States to become the Archbishop of Omaha. O'Doherty was elevated as archbishop on 14 December 1916.

As the leader of the Catholic Church in the Philippines, he established the Catholic Education Association of the Philippines (CEAP), and introduced the Legion of Mary to the country. He was appointed the head of preparations for the 1937 International Eucharistic Congress, held in Manila. In May 1938, as Bishop of Manila, he represented the Philippines at the 34th International Eucharistic Congress in Budapest, Hungary.

During the Second World War, he led the archdiocese and the Philippine Church as a whole through prayers and clandestinely helping the needy, which almost cost him his life. He established the Santisimo Rosario Parish in 1942 to serve the spiritual and social needs of those who are in the internment camp inside the Santo Tomas Internment Camp (University of Santo Tomas). He was thus under constant monitoring by the Imperial Japanese Army. After the Liberation of Manila in 1945, he led Filipino Catholics through the reconstruction by keeping morale high with prayer.

In 1949, O'Doherty founded the Manila Cathedral School, in Tondo, Manila, after the Manila Cathedral School of Intramuros was ruined in World War II.

== Death ==
Archbishop O'Doherty died on 14 October 1949, and was buried in the crypt beneath Manila Cathedral, together with past archbishops. He was the last non-Filipino and the only Irish-born person (Archbishop Harty having been born in the U.S. to two Irish parents) to be ordinary of the archdiocese, ending a long line of Spanish and American prelates.

== Gallery ==
Archbishop O'Doherty, 1947 portrait

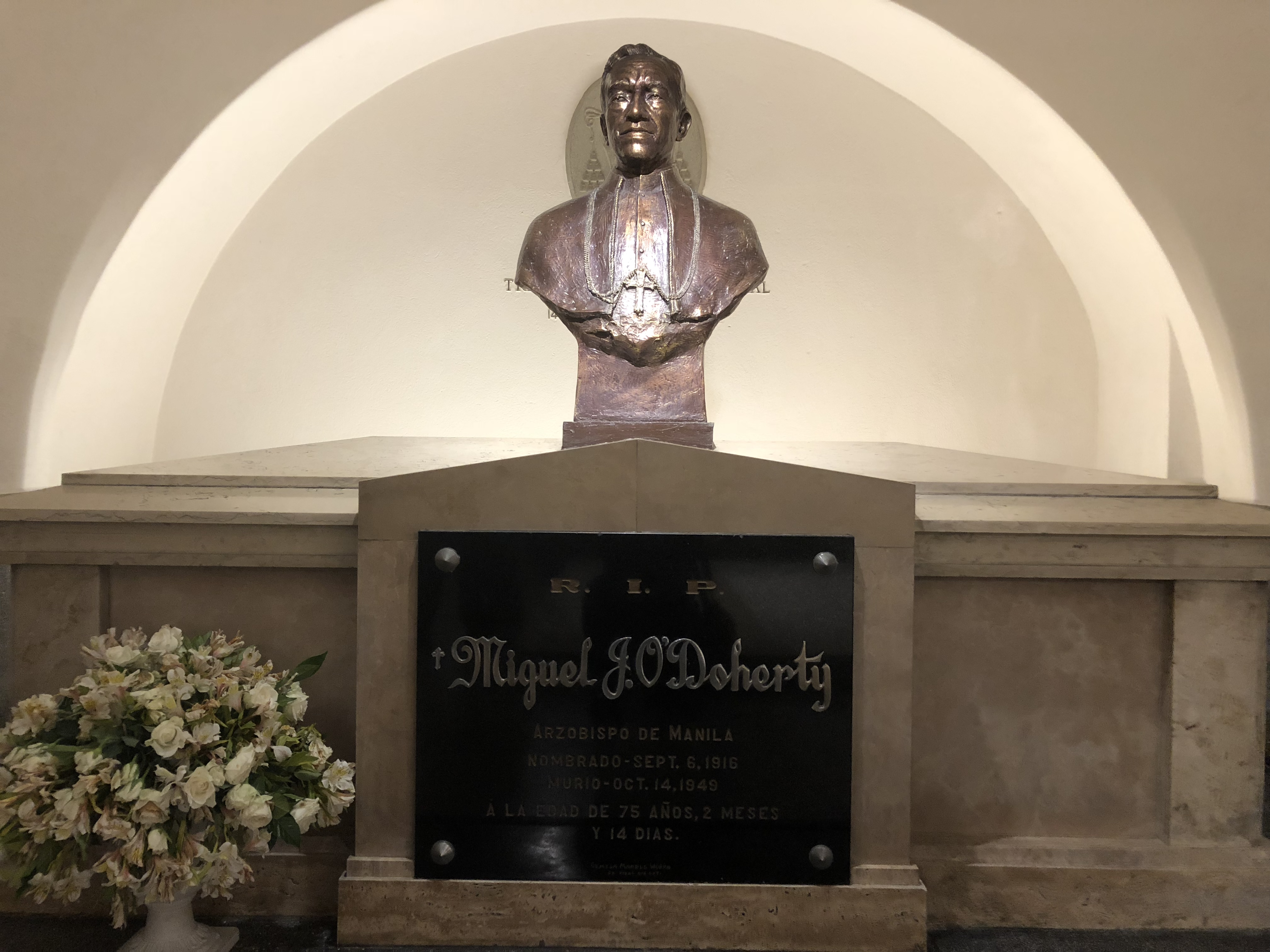
Tomb of Archbishop Michael O'Doherty at the crypt of the Manila Cathedral

== Publications ==
- Articles on Spanish Catholicism and Society, Irish Ecclesiastical Record (1911).

Catholic Church titles
New post	Bishop of Zamboanga; 1911–1916	Succeeded by James Paul McCloskey
Preceded by Jeremiah James Harty	Archbishop of Manila; 1916–1949	Succeeded by Gabriel M. Reyes
