= Mary Cecilia of Jesus =

Mary Cecilia of Jesus OCD
- Title: Prioress

Personal life
- Born: Natividad Zialcita; September 7, 1908 Quiapo, Manila, Philippine Islands
- Died: December 13, 1982 (aged 74) Lipa, Batangas, Philippines
- Resting place: Carmelite Monastery of Our Lady, Mediatrix of all graces
- Parent(s): Lorenzo Zialcita (father); Florentina de Leon (mother)

Religious life
- Religion: Catholic
- Order: Discalced Carmelite Nuns
- Consecration: November 24, 1928 (Temporary Vows); September 8, 1934 (Perpetual Vows)

Senior posting
- Period in office: 1946–1951
- Successor: Mary of Christ, OCD

Mary Cecilia of Jesus, OCD, born as Natividad Zialcita, (7 September 1908 – 13 December 1982) was a Discalced Carmelite nun and prioress of the monastery in Lipa during the time apparitions of Our Lady Mediatrix of All Graces in 1948. She was also the confidante of the visionary postulant, Teresita Castillo.

== Establishment of the Carmel of Lipa ==
When the Carmel of Gilmore was founded in 1926, and Bishop Alfredo Versoza learned about it, he began appealing to the nuns to give him a Carmel in Lipa. After the Second World War, the Carmelites responded to the invitation. The place given them was the seminary, where a number of Lipeno people had been massacred, because it was the only property in the diocese available at that time. The Carmelite monastery was founded in 1946, and Zialcita was elected prioress.

== Apparitions ==
Teresita Castillo, daughter of a former governor of Lipa, was born in Quiapo. By the time she entered the Carmel of Lipa, many mystical and unexplained occurrences had already begun. Zialcita eventually heard Castillo's reports that she was being visited by a devil and the apparition and requests of a beautiful lady in her cell. After a long observation of these events, she came to believe in the visions of Castillo. Castillo and Zialcita confided everything to their spiritual director, the auxiliary bishop Alfredo Maria Obviar. Zialcita also reportedly became a recipient of interior locutions from the Blessed Virgin Mary, who instructed her how to assist Castillo in fulfilling her requests.

== The Verdict in 1951 ==
The apparitions became later known in public through news about miraculous healings, heavy fragrance of roses, the shower of rose petals that bore images of Jesus, Mary and religious scenes, the appearance of the blue bird and the spinning sun like what happened in Fatima, Portugal. Initial recognition by the Bishop of Lipa was followed by a subsequent negative final decision. The verdict was signed by a commission composed of one archbishop and five bishops, namely: Gabriel Reyes of Manila, Bp.Cesar Maria Guerrero of San Fernando, Mariano Madriaga of Lingayen, Rufino Santos, the newly assigned Apostolic Administrator of Lipa, Vicente Reyes, Auxiliary Bishop of Manila and Juan Sison, Auxiliary Bishop of Nueva Segovia.

== Transfer ==
Zialcita was then transferred to the Carmel of Jaro.

== Later life and death ==
In February 1982, the Jesuit Federico Escalar of Ipil gave them a retreat, during which she was released from the ban of silence that had been imposed to her as well as to other witnesses of the apparitions in 1948 by the Apostolic Nunciature Egidio Vagnozzi.

On 13 December 1982, Zialcita fell from the stairs of Carmel. She suffered a head injury and later died in the night.
