= Mary Therese Vicente =

Filipino Catholic nun

Mother Mary Therese Vicente
- Mother Mary Therese during her early years as a Holy Face sister
- Title: Mother Superior

Personal life
- Born: Victorina Laxamana Vicente; March 23, 1921 Quiapo, Manila, Philippine Islands
- Died: June 7, 1995 (aged 74) Quiapo, Manila, Philippines
- Resting place: Holy Face Chapel, Quiapo, Manila, Philippines
- Parent(s): Maximino Vicente and Crispina Laxamana
- Notable works: Founder, Sisters of the Holy Face of Jesus (Apostolic); Adoration Sisters of the Holy Face of Jesus (Contemplative); Crusaders of the Holy Face (Lay Association)

Religious life
- Religion: Catholic
- Order: Sisters of the Holy Face of Jesus
- Monastic name: Mary Therese of the Holy Face of Jesus

Senior posting
- Period in office: 1986–1995

Mary Therese Vicente (March 23, 1921 – June 7, 1995) was a Filipino religious sister whose devotion to the Holy Face led her to the foundation of Sisters of the Holy Face of Jesus.

== Life ==
Victorina was born on March 23, 1921, in Quiapo, Manila. She was the seventh and the only daughter among the eleven children of the sculptor Maximo Vicente Sr., and Crispina Laxamana. At age four, Vicente experienced an almost fatal fever. However, according to the Memoirs of Mary Therese, she was given Lourdes water by a Celador of Lourdes Church, which she claimed had saved her life.

From 1928 to 1938, Victorina had formal schooling at the Colegio de Santa Rosa, Intramuros, where she finished with honors. While at the Colegio de Santa Rosa, her family's household often brought her medicine, and the nuns at the institution often gave her extra food due to her poor health. She graduated in 1941 with a degree in commerce from the University of Santo Tomas.

Victoria was among the earliest members of the Legion of Mary in the Philippines. In 1942, Vicente was made Curia President. As president, she traveled in different locations in Manila from Quiapo, Binondo and Santa Cruz despite the Japanese invasion and occupation. She organized the Inter Parish Catechetical Convention, also extending the Legion in Pampanga.

Victoria entered the Discalced Carmelites. On February 2, 1947, at the Carmelite convent in Lipa, Batangas, she received the religious name Mary Therese of the Sacred Heart after her favorite saint, Therese of Lisieux. During her stay at the convent in Lipa, she witnessed the miracles and the said apparitions of the Blessed Virgin as Our Lady Mediatrix of All Graces to the postulant, Teresita Castillo. In 1956, she was sent to the convent of Angeles City and appointed as sub-prioress.

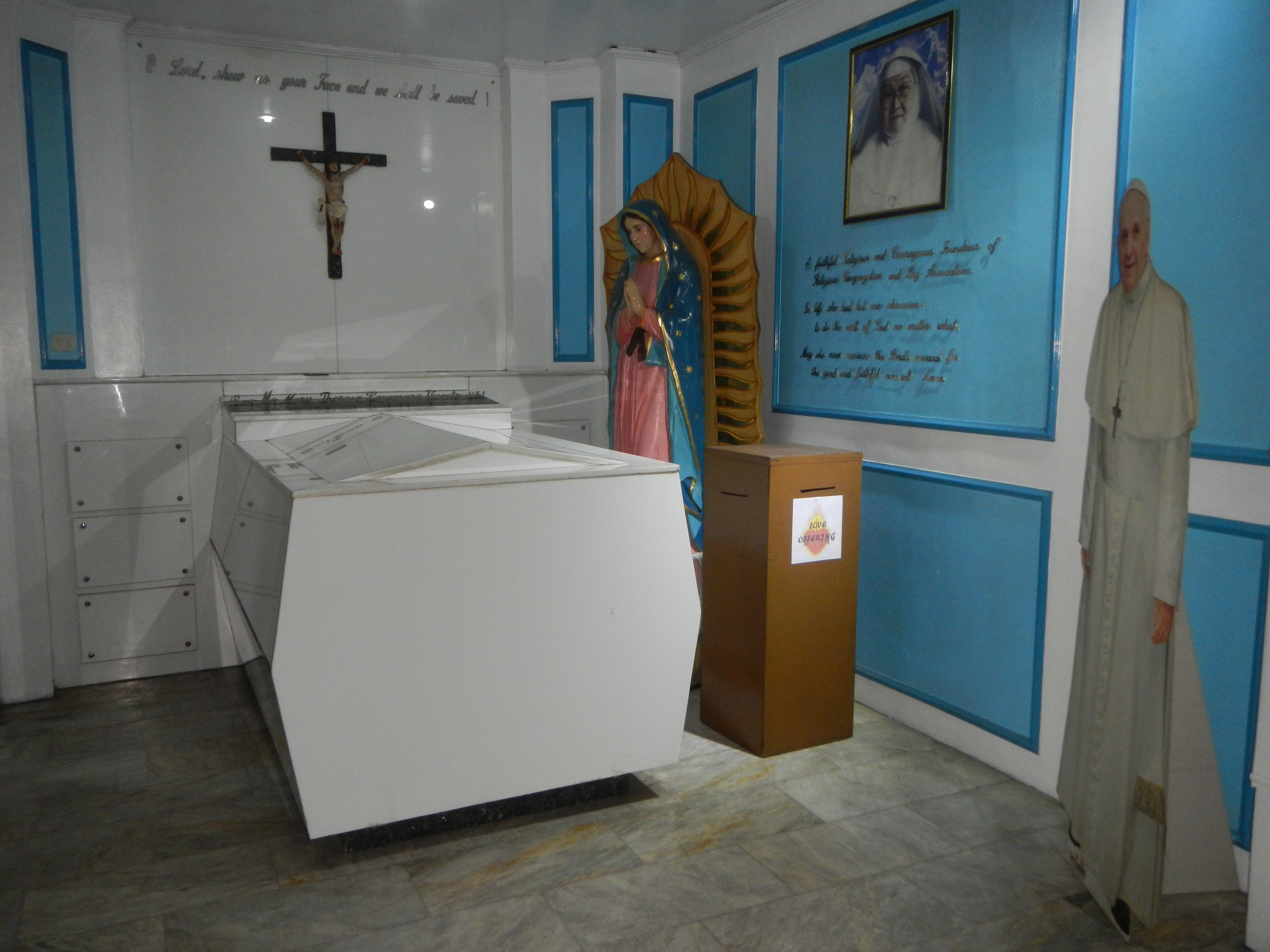
Tomb of Mother Mary Therese in Quiapo

Arriving in Naga City on August 5, 1966, she assisted Archbishop Teopisto Alberto as first superior and formator of the Daughters of Mary, Mother of the Church. She was actively engaged in social action apostolate of the archdiocese when she was assigned to the convent of Quiapo, which was to become the Holy Face center.

In 1977, she assisted Bishop Pedro Bantigue in forming the Missionaries of the Holy Face. She was likewise the first formator of the Daughters of Saint Joseph of Masbate and the organizer of the Crusaders of the Holy Face, a lay organization. In order for her to be in better service in Quiapo, she left the Daughters of Mary, and on October 1, 1986, she founded the Sisters of the Holy Face, taking the religious name Mary Therese of the Holy Face of Jesus, and served as its superior until her death.

Vicente got seriously ill in April 1995 due to diabetes complications, affecting her heart. She died on June 7, 1995. There have been calls for her to be canonized as a saint.
