= Carmelite Monastery, Carmel-by-the-Sea =

Carmelite church in Carmel, California

Carmelites by the Sea
- Interactive map of Carmelites by the Sea

Monastery information
- Denomination: Catholic
- Consecrated: October 24, 1925; November 1, 1931
- Diocese: Diocese of Monterey in California

People
- Founders: Mother Augustine; Pope Pius XI; Bishop John Bernard MacGinley

Architecture
- Architect: Maginnis & Walsh (Current location)

Site
- Location: Carmel-by-the-Sea, California, U.S.
- Coordinates: 36.522978°N 121.922866°W
- Other information: Mediatrix of all graces Mediatrix; Thérèse of Lisieux
- Website: https://carmelitesistersbythesea.org

The Carmelite Convent of Our Lady Mediatrix of All Graces and Saint Thérèse in Carmel-by-the-Sea is a convent of the Carmelites, a Catholic religious order. The Carmelite Monastery was housed from 1925 to 1931 in a building nicknamed the "Cracker Box," at Camel Point, on West Isabella Avenue, near Scenic Drive. The original monastery was created after the canonization of Thérèse of Lisieux, after which the order in Carmel is named. Five nuns were the first occupants, volunteers chosen by Reverend Mother Augustine from the Carmelite Monastery in Santa Clara. The current location in Carmel began and completed construction in 1931, opening its doors for All Saints' Day, November 1, 1931. It was designed by Maginnis & Walsh, situating it so that on the Summer solstice, the sun shines directly onto the tabernacle.

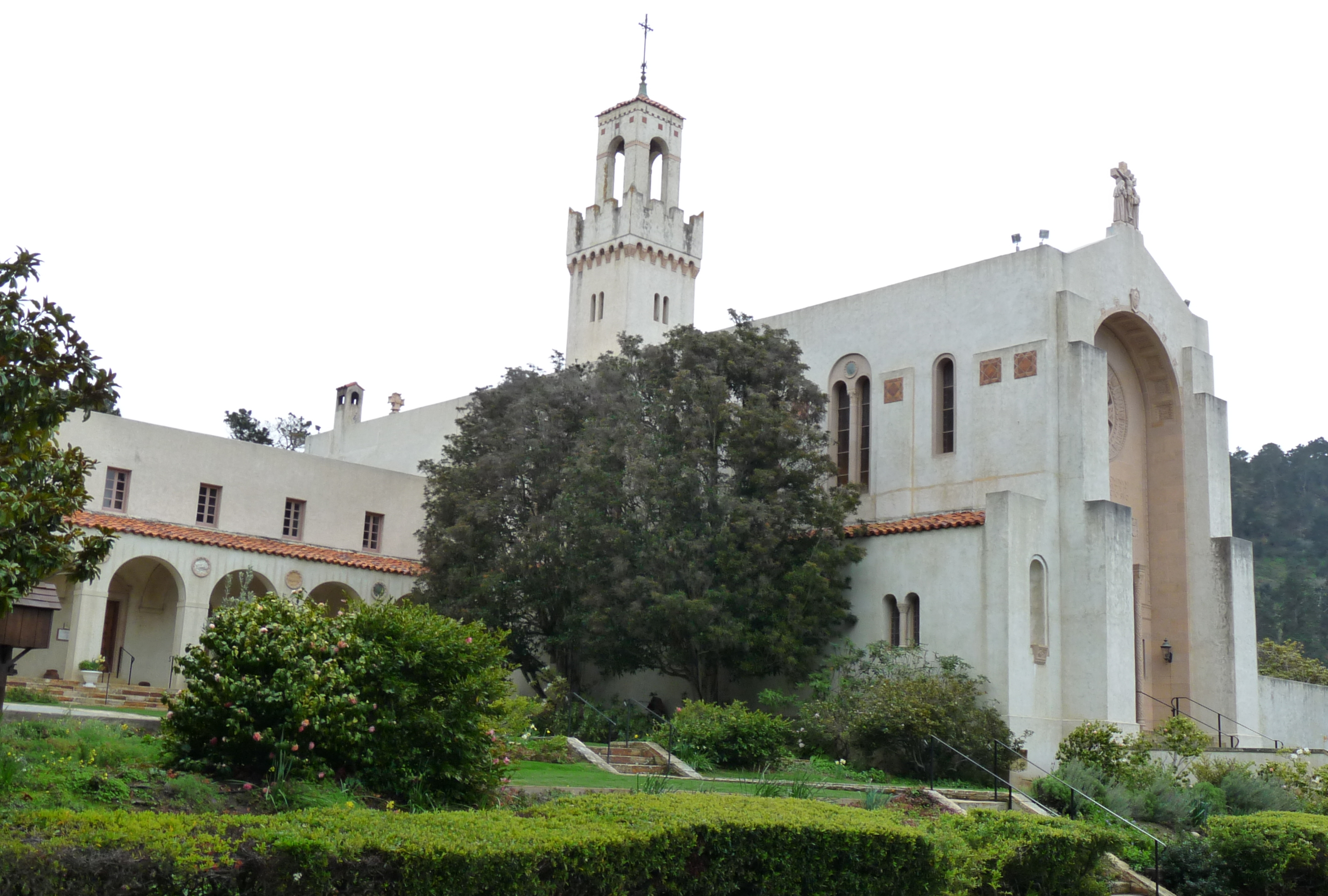
Current Carmelite Monastery, seen here in 2009.

Original Carmelite Monastery, seen here in 1928.
