= Mary Therese =

Mary Therese may refer to:

- Mary Therese Austin (d. 1889), American theater critic
- Mary Therese Cho, Filipina politician
- Mary Therese Friel (born 1959), American model, teacher, activist, businesswoman, and beauty pageant titleholder
- Mary Therese McCarthy (1912–1989), American novelist, critic, and political activist
- Mary Therese McDonnell (born 1986), Irish American soccer player
- Mary Therese Vicente (1921–1995), Filipino Roman Catholic nun
- Mary Therese Winifred Robinson (born 1944), Irish politician

== See also ==
- Maria Theresa (disambiguation)
