= Mediatrix of all graces =

Title of Mary, mother of Jesus

Mediatrix of all graces is a title that some Christians use for the Blessed Virgin Mary; as the Mother of God, it includes the understanding that she mediates Divine Grace. In addition to Mediatrix, other titles are given to her in the Church: Advocate, Helper, Benefactress. In a papal encyclical of 8 September 1894, Pope Leo XIII said: "The recourse we have to Mary in prayer follows upon the office she continuously fills by the side of the throne of God as Mediatrix of Divine grace."

In Mater Populi Fidelis, the Dicastery for the Doctrine of the Faith of the Catholic Church, in November 2025, declared that the use of the titles Mediatrix, Mediatrix of all graces, and Co-Redemptrix "have limits that do not favor a correct understanding of Mary’s unique place". The Dicastery for the Doctrine of the Faith encouraged the faithful to instead use of the title Mother of God for the Blessed Virgin Mary.

The Marian title of "Mediatrix of law and graces" existed in Latin usage since the 8th century and had a high degree of acceptance in the 11th and 12th century.

== Meaning ==
Advocates of the title argue that "at the core of Mary’s identity as the Mediatrix of Grace lies the belief that she serves as a conduit through which Divine grace flows from God to humanity." This is further divided into two interpretations: first, that Mary is the conduit of "objective redemption"--that is, the humanity-saving sacrifice of the Crucifixion--through giving birth to Jesus; and second, that Mary is the conduit of "subjective redemption," the distribution of the grace of objective redemption to individual. The latter sense is more commonly associated with the title of mediatrix.

According to advocates of the title, all graces have their origin in Christ and are then distributed by Mary's mediation. Pope Leo XIII defined Mary's role as part of a "threefold course" of grace: "it is dispensed from God to Christ, from Christ to the Virgin, from the Virgin to us."

== Proposal for dogmatic definition ==
In 1896, French Jesuit priest René-Marie de la Broise interpreted Pope Leo XIII's papal encyclical Octobri mense as teaching that all graces from Jesus Christ are imparted through Mary. Broise proposed that the pontiff should make a dogmatic definition about the role of Mary in the distribution of all graces, but did not require that it be in the form of declaring her to be the mediatrix of all graces.

In the Catholic Church there are many levels of teaching, the highest of which is a dogmatic teaching. There are also definitive teachings that have not been declared as dogmas.

Pope Pius XI appointed three theological commissions, which issued favourable opinions on the formulation of Mary's universal mediation. From her divine motherhood they derived her role as mother of the sons of God and, therefore, as Mediatrix of all graces.

In 1928, the encyclical Miserentissimus Redemptor of Pope Pius XI prayed the Virgin Mary as "the advocate of sinners, and the minister and mediatress of grace."

== Celebration in Belgium ==
In Belgium in 1918, Redemptorist priest François Xavier Godts wrote a book, De definibilitate mediationis universalis Deiparae (“On the definability of the universal mediation of the Mother of God”), proposing precisely that it be defined that Mary is Mediatrix of all graces. In April 1921, Désiré-Joseph Mercier, Cardinal Archbishop of Mechelen, Belgium wrote to his brother bishops in support of this.

In response to petitions from Belgium, including one signed by all its bishops, the Holy See approved in 1921 an annual celebration in that country of a feast day of Mary Mediatrix of All Graces. In printings of the Roman Missal from that date until 1961, the Mass of Mary Mediatrix of All Graces was found in the appendix Missae pro aliquibus locis (Masses for Some Places), but not in the General Roman Calendar for use wherever the Roman Rite is celebrated. Other Masses authorized for celebration in different places on the same day 31 May were those of the Blessed Virgin Mary Queen of All Saints and Mother of Fair Love and Our Lady of the Sacred Heart of Jesus. The Belgian celebration has now been replaced by an optional memorial on 31 August of The Virgin Mary Mediatrix.

== Scholarly opposition to dogmatic definition ==
Despite requests for a new Marian dogma, the Fathers of Vatican II and the Popes who presided at the Council, John XXIII and Paul VI decided not to proceed with new dogmatic definitions. The decree Lumen gentium of Vatican II would caution of the title of "Mediatrix" that: "This, however, is to be so understood that it neither takes away from nor adds anything to the dignity and efficaciousness of Christ the one Mediator".

In August 1996, a Mariological Congress was held in Częstochowa, Poland, where a commission was established in response to a request of the Holy See. The congress sought the opinion of scholars present there regarding the possibility of proposing a fifth Marian dogma on Mary as Coredemptrix, Mediatrix and Advocate. The commission unanimously declared that "it is not opportune to abandon the path marked out by the Second Vatican Council and proceed to the definition of a new dogma, define a fifth Marian dogma on those titles." The Declaration of Częstochowa observed that while these titles can be given a content in conformity with the deposit of the faith, nevertheless such "titles, as proposed, are ambiguous, as they can be understood in very different ways".

== Continued campaigning ==
Groups of laity and clergy, what has been called "a small but growing movement", continue to operate for proclaiming the dogma of the universal mediation of Mary. One such group calls itself Vox Populi Mariae Mediatrici. On 8 February 2008, five cardinals published a petition asking Pope Benedict XVI to declare the Blessed Virgin Mary both Co-Redemptrix and Mediatrix, and over 500 bishops later added their signatures. The magazine Inside the Vatican and Saint Thomas More College organized a one-day panel discussion on the question in Rome on 25 March 2010.

In December 2019, at a Mass in St. Peter's Basilica celebrating the feast of Our Lady of Guadalupe, Pope Francis said in referring to a picture of La Morenita that three terms came to mind, woman, mother and mestiza; the latter because "Mary makes God a mestizo, true God but also true man.” He also discouraged proposals for a new dogmatic title. "“When they come to us with the story of declaring her this or making that dogma, let’s not get lost in foolishness [in Spanish, tonteras],” he said."

== Mater Populi Fidelis ==
In Mater Populi Fidelis, the Dicastery for the Doctrine of the Faith of the Catholic Church, in November 2025, declared that the use of the titles Mediatrix, Mediatrix of all graces, and Co-Redemptrix "have limits that do not favor a correct understanding of Mary’s unique place". The Dicastery for the Doctrine of the Faith encouraged the faithful to instead use of the title Mother of God for the Blessed Virgin Mary.

In modern times, the Society of Saint Pius X (SSPX) has continued to advocate for the Marian title of Mediatrix of all graces. The SSPX has since condemned this Vatican document and "has called upon all priests affiliated with the SSPX to add an intention of reparation at all public Masses celebrated on November 16, 2025."

== Devotion in the Philippines ==
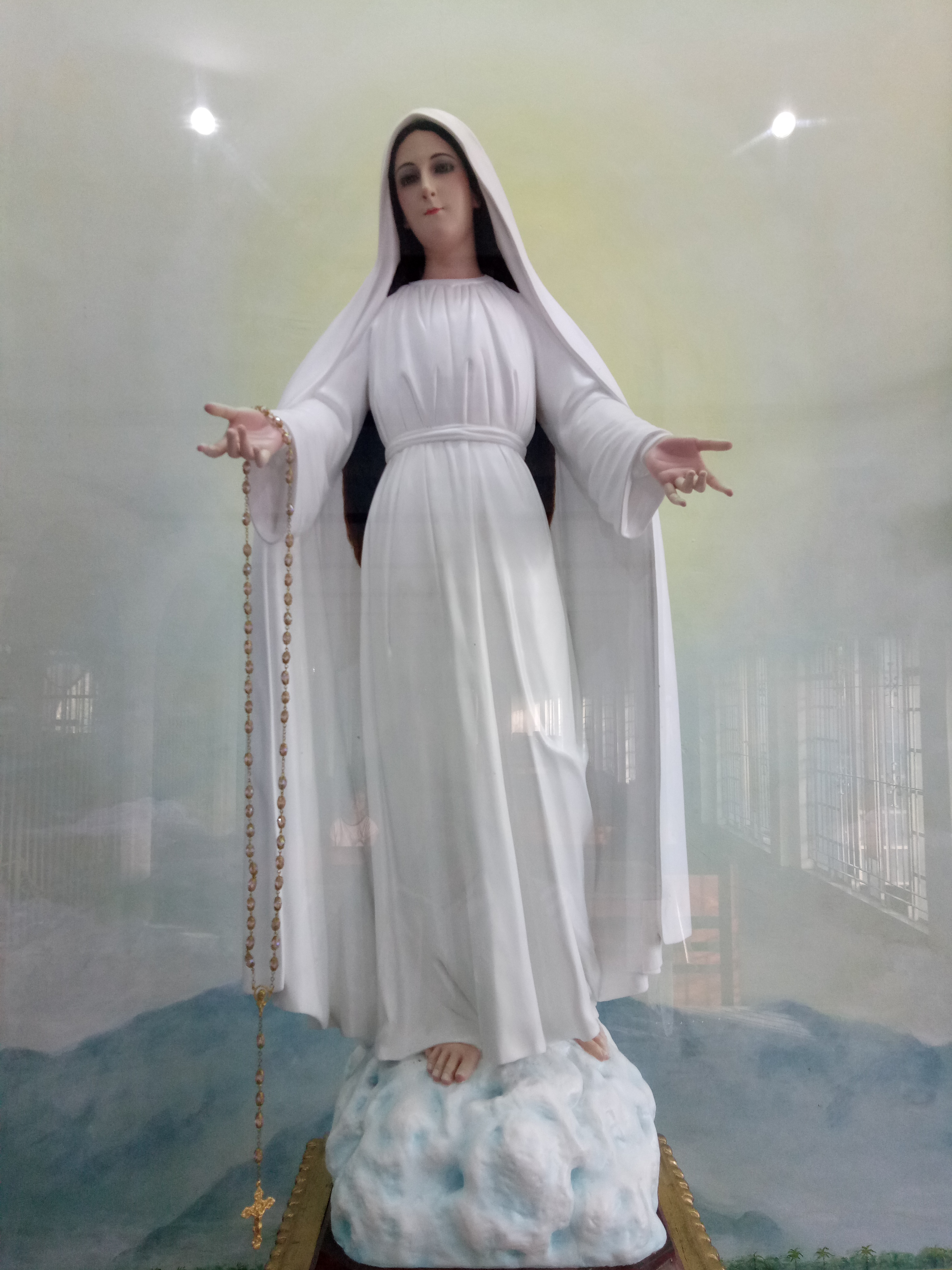
Statue of Mary, Mediatrix of All Grace at the Carmelite convent in Lipa

Among Filipino Catholics, the term "Mediatrix" is associated with an alleged 1948 apparition of the Virgin Mary to Teresita Castillo, with title Mary, Mediatrix of All Grace in the Carmelite monastery of Lipa, Batangas, Philippines. Ramón Argüelles, the archbishop emeritus of Lipa, declared his personal belief in the veracity of the 1948 apparitions, encouraging veneration of Mary under that title.

The apparition is well known in the Philippines and among the Filipino diaspora. Philippine Ambassador to the Holy See Mercedes Arrastia Tuason is a known devotee of the apparitions, and displays a large statue in her consulate office in Rome.

Mystic / stigmatist Emma de Guzman, foundress of the “La Pieta” International Prayer Group, which had received local ecclesiastical approval at one time, said that Mary had declared herself to be "the Mediatrix standing in front of the Mediator". This ruling by the local bishop was overruled in May 2016 by the Congregation of the Doctrine of the Faith declared that it had rejected the local authority's decree citing Pope Pius XII's statement in 1951 that the apparitions "were not supernatural in origin" to be definitive.
