= Egidio Vagnozzi =

Italian cardinal

His Eminence Egidio Vagnozzi
- President of the Prefecture for the Economic Affairs of the Holy See
- Church: Roman Catholic Church
- Appointed: 13 January 1968
- Term ended: 26 December 1980
- Predecessor: Angelo Dell'Acqua
- Successor: Giuseppe Caprio
- Other posts: Cardinal-Priest of San Giuseppe in Via Trionfale "pro hac vice" (1973–80); Camerlengo of the College of Cardinals (1979–80)
- Previous posts: Apostolic Delegate to the Philippines (1949–51); Titular Archbishop of Myra (1949–67); Apostolic Nuncio to the Philippines (1951–58); Apostolic Delegate to the United States of America (1958–67); Cardinal-Deacon of San Giuseppe in Via Trionfale (1967–73)

Orders
- Ordination: 22 December 1928 by Rafael Merry del Val y Zulueta
- Consecration: 22 May 1949 by Adeodato Giovanni Piazza
- Created cardinal: 26 June 1967 by Pope Paul VI
- Rank: Cardinal-Deacon (1967–73); Cardinal-Priest (1973–80)

Personal details
- Born: Egidio Vagnozzi; 26 February 1906 Rome, Kingdom of Italy
- Died: 26 December 1980 (aged 74) Vatican City
- Education: Pontifical Roman Major Seminary; Pontifical Lateran University
- Motto: Firmiter in caritate
- Coat of arms

Styles of Egidio Vagnozzi
- Reference style: His Eminence
- Spoken style: Your Eminence
- Informal style: Cardinal
- See: none

Egidio Vagnozzi (26 February 1906 – 26 December 1980) was an Italian cardinal of the Catholic Church. He served as the second president of the Prefecture for the Economic Affairs of the Holy See from 1968 until his death, and was elevated to the cardinalate in 1967.

== Biography ==
Egidio Vagnozzi was born in Rome to Francesco and Pasqua (née Jachetti) Vagnozzi, and studied at the Minor Seminary, Pontifical Roman Seminary, and Pontifical Lateran University (from where he obtained doctorates in philosophy, theology, and canon law). Ordained a priest by Cardinal Rafael Merry del Val on 22 December 1928, Vagnozzi, at age 22, required a dispensation to be ordained, not having yet reached the canonical age. He then finished his studies in 1930.

In 1930, he also became a staff member of the Secretariat of State in the Roman Curia, and was raised to the rank of Privy Chamberlain of His Holiness on 1 May 1932. Before becoming counselor of the Portuguese nunciature in 1942, he was a staff member of the apostolic delegation to the United States in 1932. Vagnozzi was counselor of the French nunciature from 1945 to 1947, and became a Domestic Prelate of His Holiness on 23 December 1945. He was an official of the delegation for the establishment of diplomatic relations with India for a year until becoming chargé d'affaires of the Holy See's mission to the Indian government in New Delhi from June to August 1948.

On 9 March 1949, Vagnozzi was appointed Apostolic Delegate to the Philippines and Titular Archbishop of Myra. He received his episcopal consecration on the following 22 May from Cardinal Adeodato Giovanni Piazza, OCD, with Archbishops Francesco Borgongini Duca and Roberto Ronca serving as co-consecrators. Following the establishment of diplomatic relations between the Holy See and the Philippines government, he was appointed the first Apostolic Nuncio to the Philippines on 9 April 1951. Vagnozzi was named Apostolic Delegate to the United States on 16 December 1958. He attended the Second Vatican Council from 1962 to 1965.

Pope Paul VI created him cardinal deacon of S. Giuseppe in via Trionfale in the consistory of 26 June 1967, and President of the Prefecture for the Economic Affairs of the Holy See on 13 January 1968. After ten years' as a cardinal deacon, Vagnozzi exercised his right to become a cardinal priest, and his deaconry was elevated pro hac vice on 5 March 1973. He was one of the cardinal electors who participated in the conclaves of August and October 1978, which selected Popes John Paul I and John Paul II respectively. He was also Chamberlain of the College of Cardinals from 30 June 1979 until his death.

Vagnozzi died in Rome, at age 74. After a funeral Mass presided by John Paul II in the Lateran Basilica, he was buried in the Campo Verano. His remains were later transferred to his cardinalitial church in March 1983.

== Positions ==
Vagnozzi was attacked by some American progressivists, such as Daniel Callahan, who was a supporter of abortion and was later a member of the Rockefeller family's Population Council and the Ford Foundation. Writing in The Atlantic Magazine in 1967, Callahan bewailed Vagnozzi's influence at the Vatican claiming that he only allowed priests with conservative views on bioethics to become bishops: "His influence is thought to be heavily responsible for the conservative cast of those bishops appointed (in the United States) in recent years".

Vagnozzi opposed the Marian apparition of Our Lady Mediatrix of All Graces, rejecting its Marian visionary Teresita Castillo, along with six Filipino local bishops who declared it "Non-Supernatural" in 1956. On 11 December 2015, the Vatican confirmed "the definitive nature of the 11 April 1951 decree by which the phenomena of Lipa were declared to lack supernatural origin."

== Notes ==
Catholic Church titles
Preceded by Guglielmo Piani, SDB	Apostolic Delegate to the Philippines; 1949–1951	Succeeded by Delegation was elevated to the rank of Apostolic Nunciature
Preceded by Delegation was elevated to the rank of Apostolic Nunciature	Apostolic Nuncio to the Philippines; 1951–1958	Succeeded by Salvatore Siino
Preceded by Amleto Giovanni Cicognani	Apostolic Delegate to the United States; 1958–1968	Succeeded by Luigi Raimondi
Preceded by Angelo Dell'Acqua	President of the Prefecture for the Economic Affairs of the Holy See; 13 January 1968 – 26 December 1980	Succeeded by Giuseppe Caprio
Preceded by Gabriel-Marie Cardinal Garrone	Chamberlain of the College of Cardinals; 1979 – 26 December 1980	Succeeded by Maximilien Cardinal de Furstenberg
