= Mediatrix =

Title given to Mary, Mother of God

Mediatrix is a title given to Mary, mother of Jesus used by some Christians. It refers to the role of the Blessed Virgin Mary as a mediator by intercession in the salvific redemption by her son Jesus Christ, the one proper Mediator by action. Mediatrix is an ancient title that has been used by many saints since at least the 5th century. Its use grew during the Middle Ages and reached its height in the writings of Louis de Montfort and Alphonsus Liguori in the 18th century.

A general role of intercession is attributed to Mary in Catholicism, Evangelical Lutheranism, Eastern Orthodoxy, and Oriental Orthodoxy, and the term "Mediatrix" was applied to her in the dogmatic constitution Lumen gentium of the Second Vatican Council. "This, however, is to be so understood that it neither takes away from nor adds anything to the dignity and efficaciousness of Christ the One Mediator."

The use of the title Mediatrix and the doctrine of Mary having a highest level of saintly intercession (called hyperdulia; owing to her special relationship with her son Jesus) is distinct from the theological issues involved in the establishment of Mediatrix of all graces as a dogma.

Further to the intercessory mediation is the claim that God bestows graces through her as the mechanism of the incarnation. A stronger version of this, which has not been officially defined by the church, is that all graces (ultimately or actually) flow through Mary's intercession.

In a 2025 doctrinal note titled Mater Populi Fidelis, the Dicastery for the Doctrine of the Faith of the Catholic Church emphasized that "the biblical statement about Christ’s exclusive mediation is conclusive," with Christ being the only Mediator. As far as the word "mediation" was concerned, the Dicastery acknowledged that "[it] is commonly used in many areas of everyday life, where it is understood simply as cooperation, assistance, or intercession." Therefore, the document concluded that it is "inevitable that the term would be applied to Mary in a subordinate sense. Used in this way, it does not intend to add any efficacy or power to the unique mediation of Jesus Christ, true God and true man."

== History ==
=== Early history ===
Mediatrix is an ancient title. A prayer attributed to Ephrem the Syrian in the 4th century calls her "after the mediator, you (Mary) are the mediatrix of the whole world." The title was also used in the 5th century by Basil of Seleucia. By the 8th century, the title Mediatrix found common use and Andrew of Crete and John of Damascus used it.

These early notions place Mary's mediation on a higher level than that of other forms of the intercession of saints. Her position as the mother of Jesus Christ the redeemer and source of grace makes her preeminent among others who might be called mediators.

=== Later Middle Ages ===
The use of the Mediatrix title continued to grow in the Middle Ages, and Bernard of Clairvaux (12th century), Bonaventure, and Bernardino of Siena (15th century) frequently used it.

In the 13th century, Thomas Aquinas noted that only Jesus Christ can be the perfect mediator between God and humankind. However, this does not hinder that others may be called mediators, in some respect, between God and man, because they assist and prepare union between God and man.

The same notion was stated in the 16th century by the Council of Trent, which declared "that the saints, who reign together with Christ, offer up their own prayers to God for men; that it is good and useful suppliantly to invoke them, and to have recourse to their prayers, aid, (and) help for obtaining benefits from God, through His Son, Jesus Christ our Lord, who is our alone Redeemer and Saviour; but that they think impiously, who deny that the saints, who enjoy eternal happiness in heaven, are to be invocated; or who assert either that they do not pray for men; or, that the invocation of them to pray for each of us even in particular, is idolatry; or, that it is repugnant to the word of God; and is opposed to the honour of the one mediator of God and men, Christ Jesus; or, that it is foolish to supplicate, vocally, or mentally, those who reign in heaven".

=== 17th–18th centuries ===
Reliance on the intercession of Mary grew and reached its height in the writings of Louis de Montfort and Alphonsus Liguori in the 18th century.

Louis de Montfort's approach (which later influenced Pope John Paul II) emphasized that Mary is the natural path to approaching Jesus because of her special relationship with him. This reliance on the intercession of Mary is based on the general Montfortean formula: "…to do all our actions by Mary, with Mary, in Mary and for Mary so that we may do them all the more perfectly by Jesus, with Jesus, in Jesus and for Jesus…"

In his book Treatise on Prayer, Alphonsus Liguori reviewed the writings of Thomas Aquinas and Bernard of Clairvaux on the intercession of saints and Mary's role as Mediatrix and strongly supported the title.

=== 19th–21st centuries ===
Several popes have used the title Mediatrix. Leo XIII used it in 1896 and Pius X in 1904. This continued in the 20th century with Benedict XV and Pius XI. However, Pius XII avoided the use of the title in official documents, although he urged reliance on the intercession of Mary.

Pope John Paul II used the title Mediatrix a number of times and in his encyclical Redemptoris Mater quoted a prayer in the Collectio Missarum de Beata Maria Virgine and noted that Mary's mediation is by intercession with the Son:

"Mary's motherhood continues unceasingly in the Church as the mediation which intercedes, and the Church expresses her faith in this truth by invoking Mary 'under the titles of Advocate, Auxiliatrix, Adjutrix and Mediatrix' ... The maternal role of Mary towards people in no way obscures or diminishes the unique mediation of Christ, but rather shows its power": it is mediation in Christ. …Mary's mediation is intimately linked with her motherhood… through this fullness of grace and supernatural life she was especially predisposed to cooperation with Christ, the one Mediator of human salvation. And such cooperation is precisely this mediation subordinated to the mediation of Christ."

In September 2012, during the Feast of the Nativity of Mary, claimant visionnaire Emma de Guzman stated that the Virgin Mary revealed her maternal role as "Mediatrix before the Mediator," a special Marian title associated by many Filipino Catholics in reference to Our Lady Mediatrix of All Graces.

== Theological issues ==
Among Catholic theologians, it is undisputed that Jesus Christ is the only mediator between God and the human race, especially in the salvific role of redemption as exhibited by the crucifixion on Mount Calvary. Accordingly, the word "mediator" in the strict sense fits Jesus alone in relation to God, but in a subordinate sense, Christians exercise a mediation "that is effective through, with, and in Christ. The subordinate mediator never stands alone, but is always dependent on Jesus."

With special reference to Mary, the Catechism of the Catholic Church, quoting the Second Vatican Council, which in its document Lumen gentium referred to Mary as "'Advocate, Auxiliatrix, Adjutrix and Mediatrix," says:

Taken up to heaven she did not lay aside this saving office but by her manifold intercession continues to bring us the gifts of eternal salvation. ...Therefore the Blessed Virgin is invoked in the Church under the titles of Advocate, Helper, Benefactress, and Mediatrix [Lumen gentium, 62]. Mary's function as mother of men in no way obscures or diminishes this unique mediation of Christ, but rather shows its power. But the Blessed Virgin's salutary influence on men ... flows forth from the superabundance of the merits of Christ, rests on his mediation, depends entirely on it, and draws all its power from it [Lumen gentium, 60]. No creature could ever be counted along with the Incarnate Word and Redeemer; but just as the priesthood of Christ is shared in various ways both by his ministers and the faithful, and as the one goodness of God is radiated in different ways among his creatures, so also the unique mediation of the Redeemer does not exclude but rather gives rise to a manifold cooperation which is but a sharing in this one source [Lumen gentium, 62].

Similarly, the Catechism of Saint Pius X affirms:

19 Q. Since Jesus Christ is our only mediator with God, why have recourse also to the intercession of the Blessed Virgin and the Saints? A. Jesus Christ is our Mediator with God, because being true God and true man He alone in virtue of His own merits has reconciled us to God and obtains us all graces. But in virtue of the merits of Jesus Christ, and through the charity which unites them to God and us, the Blessed Virgin and the Saints help us by their intercession to obtain the graces we ask. And this is one of the great benefits of the Communion of Saints.

— Catechism of Saint Pius X

At a Mariological Congress held at Czestochowa in August 1996, a commission was established in response to a request, by the Holy See, which had asked to know the opinion of the scholars present at the Congress on the possibility of defining a new dogma of faith regarding Mary as Coredemptrix, Mediatrix and Advocate. (In recent years, the Pope and various dicasteries of the Holy See had received petitions requesting such a definition.) The response of the commission, deliberately brief, was unanimous and precise: It found that the titles, as proposed, were ambiguous, as they can be understood in very different ways. It also held that it was not opportune to abandon the path marked out by the Second Vatican Council and proceed to the definition of a new dogma.

Marian mediation is exercised in the following areas:

- mediator of the Incarnation of the Word of God in her maternal womb;
- mediation in the Redemption, inasmuch as the *mediation of the Son of God would not have been possible if he had not assumed human nature from the womb of a ever Virgin, thus remaining in hypostatic union with the divine nature (the divine nature and the human nature of Christ are equally important for the purpose of his saving mediation);
- Intercession for divine grace with God;
- in an ascending sense, as a way to reach Christ.

Fr. David Meconi and Carl E. Olson affirmed that Mary is witness that divinization is no longer out of reach. Christ is a divine hypostasis incarnated; Mary is a human hypostatis divinized."

Roman Catholic theologians distinguish between universal mediation (in Latin: mediatio in universali) and particular mediation (in Latin: mediation in speciali). while the first concerns Mary's role as Mother of God and therefore source of saving grace, the second concerns her Intercession from heaven for special graces on behalf of one or people (alive or in Purgatory). The distinction is symmetrical to that between remote and immediate co-redemption.

== Mediatrix of all graces ==
Going further than expressing belief in Mary as Mediatrix, proposals have been made to declare that Mary is the Mediatrix of all graces. Pope Benedict XV allowed the dioceses of Belgium to celebrate the feast of Mary Mediatrix of all graces on May 31 each year. In printings of the Roman Missal from that date until 1961, the Mass of Mary Mediatrix of All Graces was found in the appendix Missae pro aliquibus locis (Masses for Some Places), but not in the general calendar for use wherever the Roman Rite is celebrated. Other Masses authorized for celebration in different places on the same day were those of the Blessed Virgin Mary Queen of All Saints and Mother of Fair Love and Our Lady of the Sacred Heart of Jesus. The Belgian celebration has now been replaced by an optional memorial on 31 August of the Virgin Mary Mediatrix.

== See also ==
- Co-Redemptrix
