= Maria Pia Mastena =

Beatified Italian religious sister

Blessed Maria Pia Mastena
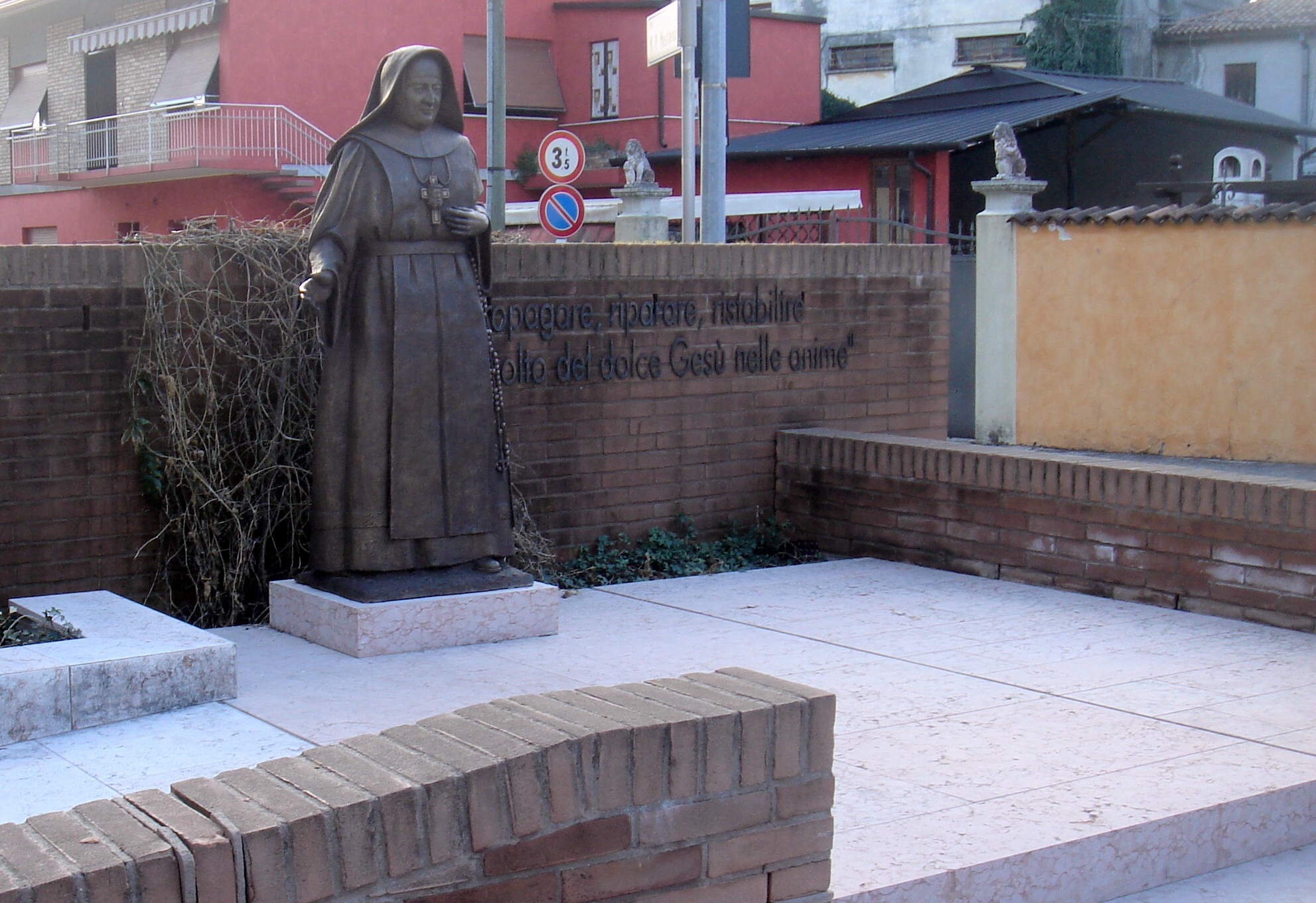
- San Fior - Monument to Mastena in place since 2000.

Virgin
- Born: 7 December 1881; Bovolone, Verona, Kingdom of Italy
- Died: 28 June 1951 (aged 69); Rome, Lazio, Italy
- Venerated in: Roman Catholic Church
- Beatified: 13 November 2005, Saint Peter's Basilica by Cardinal José Saraiva Martins
- Feast: 28 June

Blessed Maria Pia Mastena (7 December 1881 - 28 June 1951) - born Teresa Maria - was an Italian religious sister in the Roman Catholic Church. She was the founder of the Religious Sisters of the Holy Face. Mastena fostered a deep devotion to the Holy Face of Jesus and tried to promote that devotion to others in her religious career as a nun. Mastena first desired the contemplative life, but she was denied this after she entered the convent, since it was not a cloister. Instead, she dedicated herself to teaching in several Italian cities after leaving another convent and another religious order when she deemed contemplative life was not what God wanted for her. Her labors were dedicated instead to consolidating a new religious congregation, which began to grow after World War II until Mastena's sudden death in 1951. Mastena was beatified on 13 November 2005.

== Life ==
=== Childhood and religious beginnings ===
Teresa Maria Mastena was born in Bovolone on 7 December 1881 as the first of five children to Giulio Mastena and Maria Antonia Casarotti. Her father worked as a small businessman and grocer, and her mother served as a teacher. Her baptism was celebrated in the local parish church on 29 December 1881. Mastena received her First Communion on 19 March 1891 and made a private vow to remain chaste in devotion to God. Her Confirmation was made on 27 August 1891.

Mastena began her schooling at home, where her mother taught her, before she attended a kindergarten that the Sisters of Mercy managed. In her adolescence, she was active in parish activities and acted as a catechist for the children. It was in 1891 that she reported her first experience centered on a devotion to the Holy Face of Jesus. Mastena later asked to enter the religious life in 1895 as a teenager, but was accepted as a postulant much later on 3 September 1901 at the Institute of the Sisters of Mercy of Verona. On 29 September 1902, she commenced her novitiate and received the religious habit. On 24 October 1903, she professed her perpetual vows and assumed the religious name "Passitea Maria of the Child Jesus".

=== Teaching and cloister ===
In October 1905, she completed her studies at the Institute of Carlo Montanari in Verona and obtained a diploma as a schoolteacher; she received a further teaching qualification on 7 October 1907 and then one as a kindergarten teacher in August–September 1908. In 1905, she began teaching, and on 28 October 1908, she began teaching at the new center of the congregation in Miane (in the hills of Treviso) before soon becoming its director. During World War I, she continued to be active in Miane and was quite close to the scene of the battle of the Piave. On 7 July 1912, she established an orphanage in Miane and a recreational club in 1917-1918. But after the war came events that had a profound impact on her: the death of her mother led her to seek seclusion as a nun, which was something that her superiors did not permit. To that end, she left the congregation and on 15 April 1927 entered the Cistercian convent San Giacomo di Veglia in Vittorio Veneto, where she assumed the religious name Maria Pia. Mastena was clothed in the Cistercian habit on 2 June 1927 when she commenced her novitiate. In the enclosure, she became known for her strict adherence to the order's rule and for her deep devotion to both the Eucharist and the Passion of Jesus.

=== Congregation founding ===
On 15 November 1927, the Bishop of Vittorio Veneto, Eugenio Beccegato, her spiritual director, asked her to leave the convent and resume teaching after Mastena doubted whether the contemplative life was meant for her. This was something that she had confided before Beccegato. Mastena did this from 1927 until 1930, first in Miane (1927–28) before teaching in Follina Carpesica (1928–30) and then in San Fior (1930–36), where she opened a nursery school and a soup kitchen. In this period, she began to form the idea of a congregation dedicated to the Face of Christ, which was rooted in her devotion to a significant degree. In San Fior in 1930, she organized a small community called "Pious Rescue" to assist poor children and teach them a trade. Soon, a large number of aspiring sisters began to gather around Mastena, and in October 1932, the local bishop approved of this congregation. From 1935 to 1936, this congregation was dissolved twice due to the opposition from some local priests. However, after a trip to Rome on 8 December 1936, Mastena obtained the local bishop's recognition of the congregation on a diocesan level.

Towards the middle of the 1940s, the congregation began establishing small offices in other Italian cities and on 12 May 1940, Mastena met Pope Pius XII in a private audience to discuss her work. This was during World War II, and the congregation participated in relief activities for soldiers and victims of the conflict, and fed them free of charge and without distinction between Italians, Germans, or Jews, since no side existed in their view. The decisive moment came after Pope Pius XII confirmed it as the Congregation of Pontifical Right on 10 December 1947. The congregation's purpose is to aid the sick in nursing homes and help aspiring priests. On 8 December 1948, at the congregation's first General Chapter, Mastena was made the first Superior-General and held that position until her death. In 1949, she also established a clinic in Rome, which the Sisters of the Holy Face were to run.

=== Ill health and death ===
From 1950 to 1951, she began to have health problems of a serious nature, which included a heart attack, and had to suspend her activities and trips to Rome. Her health took a grave turn in March 1951. Mastena's sudden death came on the evening of 28 June 1951; her funeral was held both in Rome (on 1 July) and in San Fior (on 4 July). Her remains were first buried in Campo Verano but later moved to the San Fior motherhouse in a chapel on 26 December 1953. In 2005, the congregation had 143 sisters in 22 houses, which extended to Brazil and Indonesia.

== Beatification ==
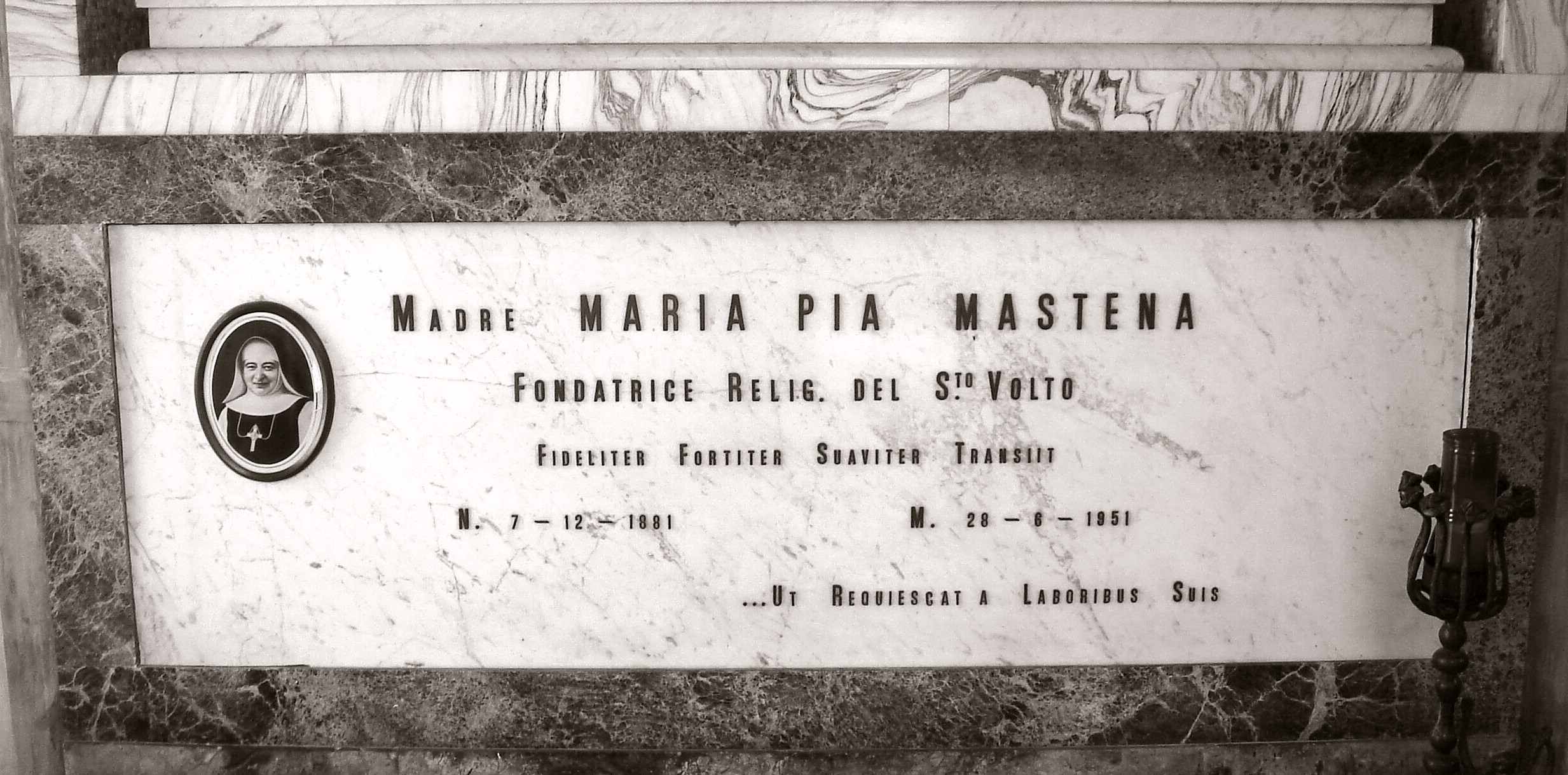
Tomb of the Blessed Maria Pia Mastena in San Fior

The beatification process opened on 23 June 1990 after the Congregation for the Causes of Saints issued the nihil obstat ("no objections") and titled Mastena as a Servant of God. The diocesan process for the investigation opened in Rome on 24 September 1990 and was closed on 30 April 1992. The Congregation later validated the process on 30 April 1993 in a decree and received the Positio dossier from the cause's officials (the postulation) in 1994 for additional assessment.

The theologians tasked to assess the cause approved the dossier's contents on 17 March 2002 while the cardinal and bishop members comprising the Congregation agreed with this decision at their meeting on 7 May 2002. Pope John Paul II confirmed that Mastena had lived a model life of heroic virtue and named the as venerable on 5 July 2002.

Mastena's beatification required a miracle to receive papal confirmation in order for beatification to take place. The process for one case was held from 2000 to 2001. In 2002, medical experts approved the miraculous nature of healing. Theologians concurred in this verdict on 26 March 2004, and the congregation members also voiced their approval on 1 June 2004. On 22 June, the pope provided the final assent needed, which confirmed Mastena's beatification to be held.

The beatification was held on 13 November 2005 in Saint Peter's Basilica with Cardinal José Saraiva Martins presiding on the behalf of Pope Benedict XVI who made remarks at the conclusion of the beatification. Benedict XVI stated in his remarks following the beatification Mass:

Won over by the Face of Christ, she assumed the Son of God's sentiments of sweet concern for humanity disfigured by sin, put into practice his acts of compassion and subsequently planned an Institute whose aim was to "propagate, repair and restore Jesus' gentle image in souls."

She was beatified thanks to a miracle recognized by the Catholic Church to the daughter of Sandra Milo, Azzurra, who seemed dead at birth, but came back to life. The postulator for this cause is the Passionist priest Giovanni Zubiani.
