= Mary, Mediatrix of All Grace =

Marian Apparition in the Philippines

Mary, the Mediatrix of All Grace
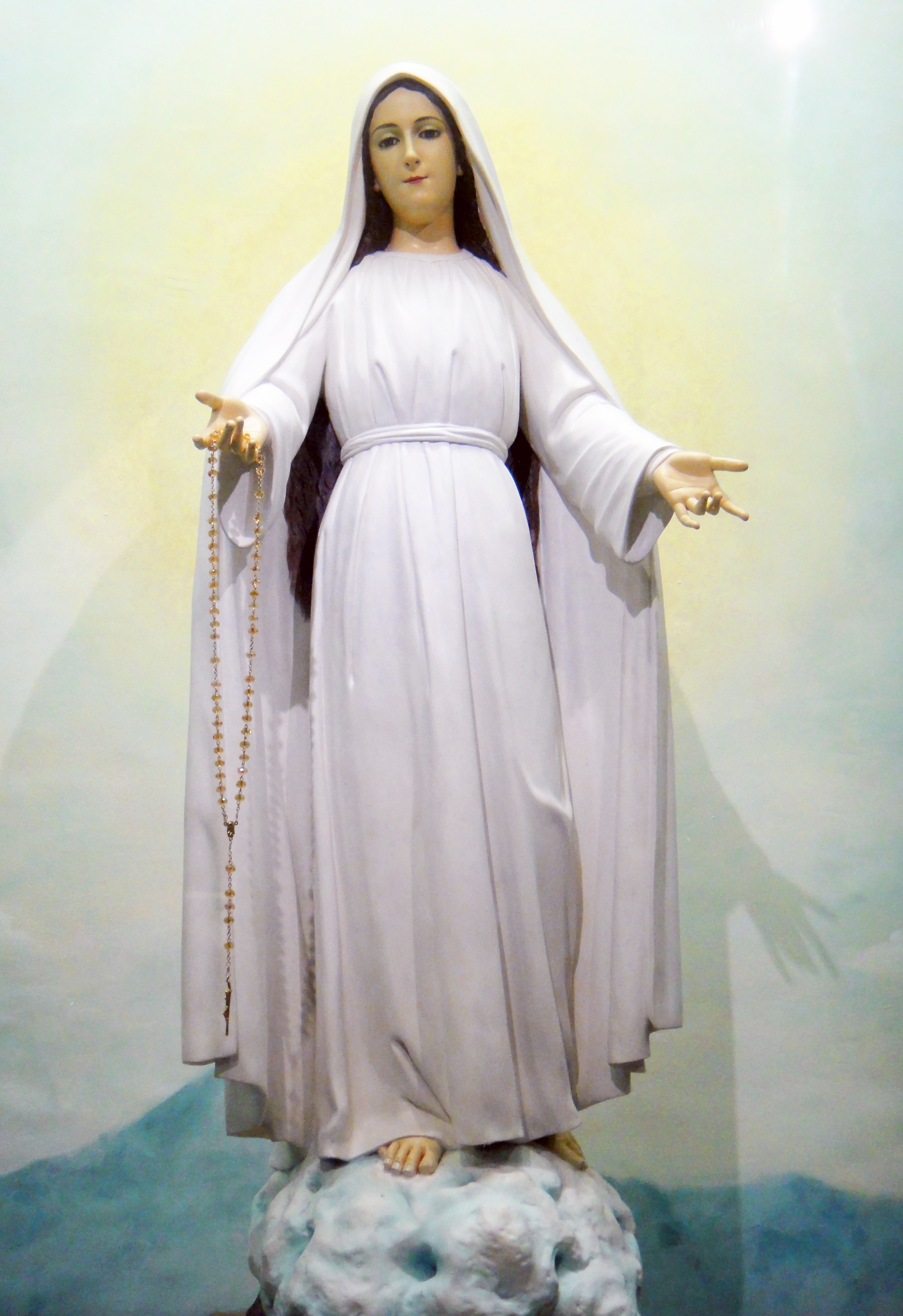
- The original image based on the 1948 Marian apparition, enshrined today in Lipa, Batangas
- Location: Carmelite Monastery, Lipa, Batangas
- Date: November 12, 1948
- Witness: Teresita Castillo
- Type: Marian apparition
- Approval: Dismissed – December 11, 2015; Approved (Local) – September 12, 2015; Re-investigated – 1991; Suppressed – April 11, 1951
- Shrine: Our Lady, Mary Mediatrix of All Grace Parish

Mary, the Mediatrix of All Grace (Spanish: María, Mediadora de Toda-Gracia; Tagalog: María, Tagapamagitan ng Lahat ng Biyaya), also known as the Our Lady of Lipa, is an alleged Marian apparition that occurred within the Carmelite Monastery of Lipa, Batangas, Philippines. The event occurred to a former Carmelite postulant, Teresita Castillo. The original statue associated with the apparition is currently enshrined at the monastery.

The apparitions were declared as Non-supernatural after an investigation by six Filipino bishops headed by the former Archbishop of Manila, Cardinal Rufino Santos on 11 April 1951. Pope Pius XII declared the apparitions as fraudulent in 1951. The case was reopened again in 1991 by the local bishop.

On 12 September 2015, the Archbishop of Lipa, Ramon Arguelles, against explicit direction from the Holy See and the Catholic Bishops' Conference of the Philippines, formally declared approval of the apparitions, citing them as "supernatural and worthy of belief". On December 11, 2015, the Vatican re-affirmed the earlier verdict of the apparition as Non-Supernatural. A finalized copy of the verdict was received on May 31. Ultimately, Archbishop Arguelles retracted his declaration of supernaturality on June 1, 2016, citing to the original decision by the Holy Office as Non-Supernatural.

== Name ==
The Blessed Virgin Mary is honored under the title Mediatrix of all graces. It has its mystical origins in Belgium where devotion under this title began.

== Claims of Marian apparitions ==
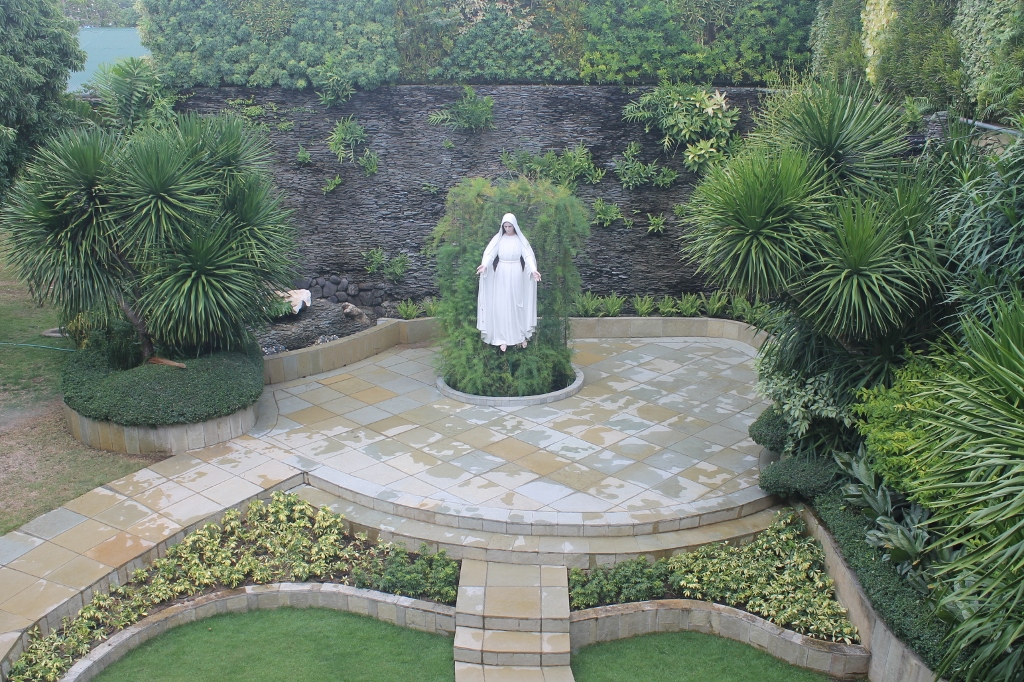
The garden in Carmel, Lipa, with the vine on which the Virgin appeared in 1948

Prior to the Marian apparitions, Teresita Castillo claimed to have encountered the Devil on several occasions under demonic torture. On 18 August 1948, Castillo, then a postulant at the monastery, noticed a heavenly odour, and upon entering her room saw a beautiful lady in white who spoke to her: "Do not fear my daughter, He who loves above all things has sent me. I come with a message..."

According to the account, on 12 September 1948, Castillo was in the convent garden and noticed a vine shaking without any wind blowing. She then heard a woman's voice that instructed her to visit the garden for 15 consecutive days. The next day, September 13, Castillo came to the spot at 5:00 p.m., knelt down and intended to say the Hail Mary. In the middle of the prayer, wind came, the garden vine moved, and a beautiful lady appeared. Castillo described the lady as having her hands clasped in prayer and holding a golden rosary in her right hand. The lady asked her to pray for priests and nuns.

On September 14, rose petals began to shower within the monastery, and some of the nuns noticed rose petals outside their hallways.

The prioress, Mary Cecilia of Jesus, decided to consult with Alfredo Obviar, Auxiliary Bishop of Lipa and spiritual director of the nuns. The bishop instructed the prioress to demand proof from the lady that she is from heaven.

On November 12, 1948, Castillo claimed that the apparition told her she was "Mary, Mediatrix of All Grace".

In October 17, 1949, the apparition allegedly prophesied an "invasion" by China of the Philippines and the world, with money as the instrument "leading the people of the world to destruction." The apparition happened roughly three weeks after the Communist takeover of China. According to Cardinal Ricardo Vidal, in his 2014 letter to the Catholic Bishops Conference of the Philippines, it was one of the apparition's "secrets" revealed to Castillo. Vidal wrote the letter two years after the start of the Scarborough Shoal standoff.

== Description of the apparition ==
According to Teresita Castillo, the Virgin Mary was slightly stooped and dressed in white, with a narrow cloth belt about her waist. Her face was radiant, and her statues often show her dark hair flowing down her back beneath a white veil. Her hands are clasped on her breast, and a golden rosary hangs from her right hand. She is shown barefoot on clouds about two feet above the ground.

=== Later events ===
Castillo herself in an interview said she had met the Apostolic Nuncio to the Philippines Cardinal Egidio Vagnozzi in 1951, and told him that she had already left the monastery to seek medical treatment. Vagnozzi strongly disapproved, called Castillo the Devil, and asked her to leave his presence, even trying to shove her out the door. Castillo burst into tears and begged for his blessing, which he withheld.

The current archbishop of Lipa, Ramón Argüelles, noted that auxiliary bishop Obviar and Bishop of Lipa Verzosa, who were on the commission, were forced to leave the investigation due to their lack of jurisdiction over Lipa. In a televised interview with ABS-CBN, Argüelles said no documents were compiled or even reached the Holy See in 1951, causing its immediate rejection. In 1991, a petition to approve the apparition began once again.

== Rejection by the Holy Office ==
On March 28, 1951, the Supreme Sacred Congregation of the Holy Office (later known as the Congregation for the Doctrine of the Faith) declared that the events in Lipa have no signs of supernatural character or origin. This was reportedly confirmed by Pope Pius XII. On April 11, 1951, an initial investigation report was signed by six Roman Catholic bishops and declared the Lipa apparitions Non-supernatural. Bishop Cesar Guerrero reportedly later recanted on his deathbed.

Apostolic Administrator Rufino Santos directed that the statue of Mary as Mediatrix of All Grace be retired from public veneration. According to a later interview with the prioress, Mother Mary of the Sacred Heart and Sister Mary Balthazar were ordered to burn several boxes containing leaflets, novena booklets, rose petals, and other paraphernalia pertaining to the apparition, including Castillo's personal diary. The sisters were also ordered by the bishop to throw the image of the Virgin into a bonfire, but they instead hid it out of piety.

On May 21, 1990, then-Lipa Archbishop Mariano G. Gaviola, allowed the veneration of the namesake Marian image after forty years of being banned from the public.

On April 17, 2005, Archbishop Argüelles publicly declared that he found no objection to the devotion under this Marian title. In November 2009 he formed a commission to investigate the apparitions anew.

On September 12, 2015, Argüelles formally released the canonical results of the investigation launched by the archdiocese, declaring the Marian apparitions to be "Supernatural in character and worthy of pious belief".

On December 11, 2015, the Holy Office decreed through Cardinal Gerhard Ludwig Müller overruled the Archbishop and rejected his 2012 decree declaring that the alleged Marian apparitions in Batangas in 1948 were supernatural. Arguelles himself disclosed the ruling through an archdiocesan communiqué on May 31. In its decree, the Congregation stated that Pope Pius XII had made a definitive confirmation in 1951 against the supposed apparitions declaring that they "were not of supernatural origin," which the local authority had no authority to overrule.

On March 19, 2024, in a circular, Archbishop Gilbert Garcera of the Roman Catholic Archdiocese of Lipa stated that the Dicastery for the Doctrine of the Faith, following a request by Bishop Pablo Virgilio David, revealed the 1951 decree rejecting the apparition adding that Sister Mother Mary Cecilia confessed to having "deceived the faithful about the alleged apparitions in Lipa and consequently asked for forgiveness".

Evidence of the existence of the decree has legal implications in the region. In December 2022 Harriet Demetriou, former justice of the anti-graft court Sandiganbayan, filed a perjury complaint against Dominican exorcist priest Father Winston Cabading for claiming under oath that the 1951 decree existed. The case is pending. "Give me the document, let me examine it. If it's valid, if it's really authentic, then I will submit myself. Who am I to fight the Pope?" Demetriou told Rappler. However, the Catholic Bishops Conference of the Philippines said it was necessary to review the case, citing lapses in the communication of Rome's decision.

The Discastery of the Doctrine of the Faith of the Vatican has issued Mater Populi fidelis. In the document, it discourages to refer to Mary the titles "Mediatrix" and "Mediatrix of All Graces" because it diminishes or supersedes the exclusive role of Jesus Christ as the unique redeemer.

== Veneration ==
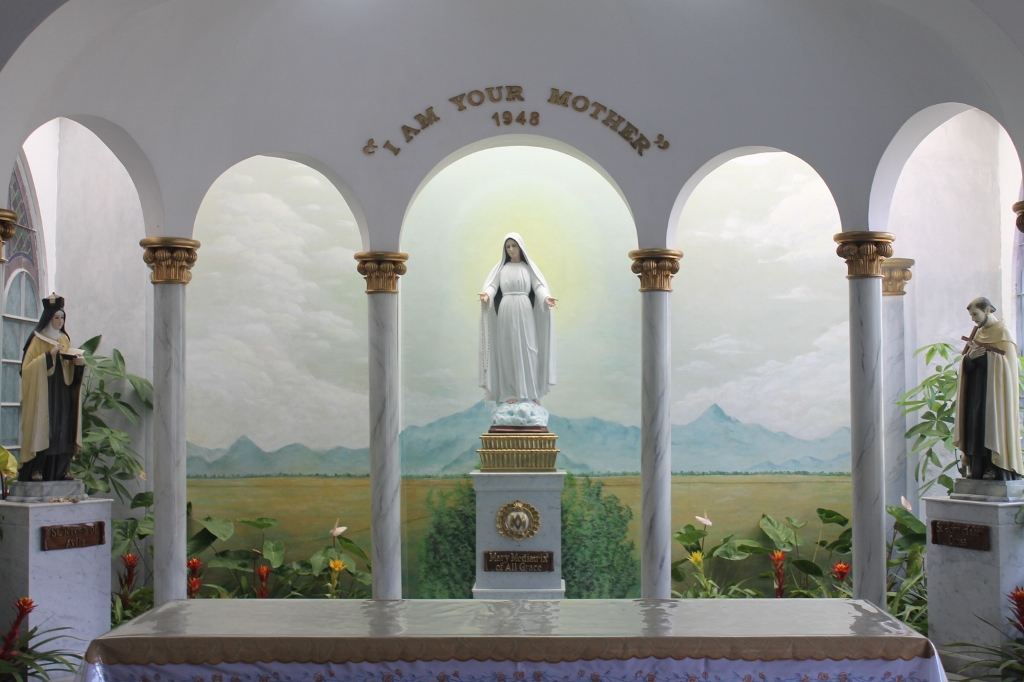
The side chapel in the monastery church where the image of Mary, Mediatrix of All Grace is currently enshrined

Former Philippine Ambassador to the Holy See, Mercedes Arrastia Tuason, is a devotee of the apparitions, and displayed a large statue of Our Lady Mediatrix of All Grace in her consular office in Rome.

Emma de Guzman, purported visionary, stigmatist and foundress of the church-sanctioned "La Pietà" International Prayer Group, said that Mary had declared herself to be "the Mediatrix standing in front of the Mediator".

The Archdiocese of Lipa currently endorses Marian devotion to this title, which is not expressly prohibited as long as it does not counter church doctrine. In January 17, 2015, Pope Francis venerated a replica of the image at the residence of the Archbishop of Palo. In Batangas province, local bishops often tolerate the devotion in public.

== See also ==
- Mediatrix of All Grace offending religious feelings case – legal case involving a devotee of the apparition and a Roman Catholic priest.
