= Linoë =

Linoë was a city and episcopal see in the Roman province of Bithynia Secunda and is now a titular see.

== History ==
It is known only from the Notitiae Episcopatuum which mention it as late as the twelfth and thirteenth centuries as a suffragan of the archbishopric of Nicaea. The Byzantine Emperor Justinian must have raised it to the rank of a city.

It is probably the modern Turkish town of Bilecik, a station on the Hnidar-Pasha railway to Konya. It became an important centre for the cultivation of the silk-worm.

Lequien (Oriens christianus, I, 657) mentions four bishops of Linoe:

- Anastasius, who attended a Council of Constantinople in 692
- Leo, at the Second Council of Nicea in 787
- Basil and Cyril, the one a partisan of Ignatios of Constantinople, the other of Photius, at the Fourth Council of Constantinople in 879.
