= Sisters of the Holy Face =

Catholic religious congregation

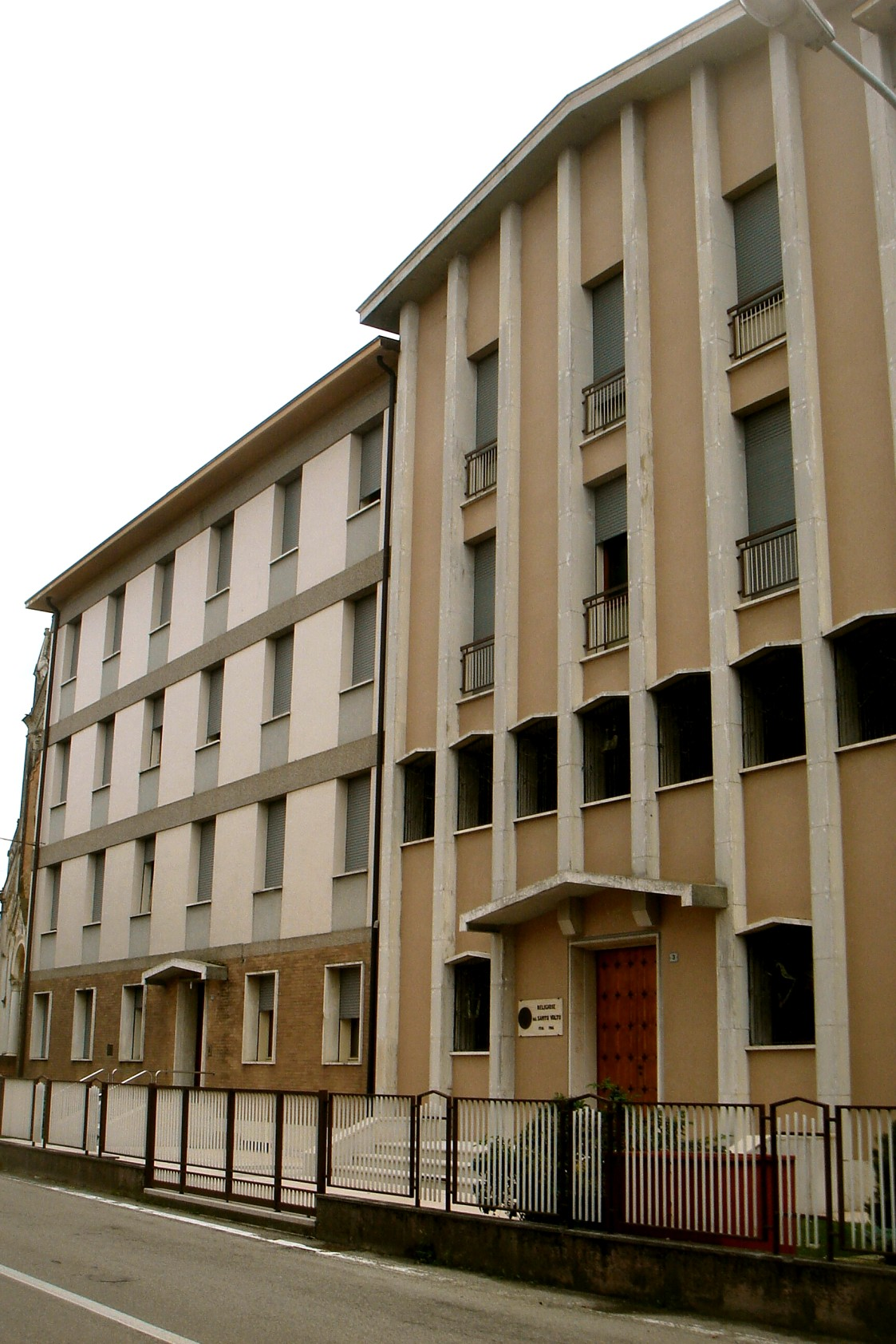
Motherhouse of the congregation, the Holy Face Institute in San Fior, Italy

The Sisters of the Holy Face (Sororum a Sancto Vultu) abbreviated SSV, also known as the Institute of Sisters of the Holy Countenance), are a congregation in the Roman Catholic Church. The congregation was founded in San Fior in Treviso Italy in 1930 by Blessed Maria Pia Mastena.

== History ==
Maria Pia Mastena joined the Sisters of Mercy of Verona and obtained her teaching license, but after World War I left to become a Cistercian. Shortly after, on advice of her spiritual director, she left the convent and resumed teaching. She opened a nursery school and soup kitchen. In 1930 she organized a small group called "Pious Rescue" which was aimed at assisting poor children and teaching them a trade. She was soon joined by other young women.

Despite the opposition from some local priests, the congregation was initially approved by the Bishop of Vittorio Veneto on December 8, 1936. During World War II the sisters participated in relief activities for soldiers and victims of the conflict, feeding them free of charge. They received the approval of the Congregation of Pontifical Right on 10 December 1947.

The purpose of the congregation is to aid the sick in nursing homes as well as to help aspiring priests. In 1949 they established a clinic in Rome which the Sisters of the Holy Face run. The congregation has 22 houses, including some in Brazil. They first arrived in Indonesia in 1991.
