= Mercedes Arrastia-Tuason =

Filipino diplomat

Mercedes Arrastía Vda. de Tuason

Philippine Ambassador to the Holy See
- In office October 2nd, 2009 – September 1st, 2018
- President: Gloria Macapagal Arroyo; Benigno Aquino III; Rodrigo Duterte
- Pope: Pope Francis; Pope Benedict XVI
- Preceded by: Cristina Ponce Enrile
- Succeeded by: Grace Relucio Princesa

Personal details
- Born: María de las Mercedes Arrastía y Reinares; February 27, 1930 (age 96) Lubao, Pampanga, Philippine Islands
- Children: Ignacio Xavier Tuason y Arrastía
- Education: Saint Scholastica's Catholic College of Manila
- Profession: Diplomat

Mercedes Arrastía Vda. de Tuason (born September 27, 1930) in Lubao, Pampanga, is a Philippine diplomat and former ambassador to the Holy See. An alumnus of Saint Scholastica's Catholic college in Manila, Tuason has served in the field of nutritional sciences and was appointed plenipotentiary to the Holy See in 2009.

In the Philippines, Tuason is particularly known as an advocate of the Holy Rosary devotion and her roles in many charitable organizations, namely the Red Cross foundation. In May 2003 Pope John Paul II awarded Tuason the Magistral dame of the Sovereign Military Order of Malta. On May 23, 2012, Pope Benedict XVI awarded Tuason the Grand Cross of Merit for the title Order of Pius IX due to her charitable works and diplomatic service to the Catholic Church, a coveted title that was not granted to ladies until November 1993. Currently, the Order of Pius IX is the third to the highest ranking order granted by the Pope through chivalry, the highest being the Supreme Order of Christ.

Tuason is also known for her anti-abortion activism and cooperation with the Archdiocese of Manila in challenging the legalization of abortion through the Reproductive Health Bill. Tuason has fluency in writing and speaking in Tagalog, English, Spanish and Italian language and has partial fluency in the Hokkien dialect.

== Personal life ==
Prior to being appointed ambassador to the Holy See, Tuason attended Saint Scholastica's Catholic college where she obtained a bachelor's degree in nutritional sciences, where she had also received the Pax Award. Mercedes had 7 children with Jose Ramon Del Rosario Tuason, a prominent businessman. Together they had Jose, Ramon, Iñaki, Rossana, Karen, Paolo and Jingy. In 1970, Tuason was widowed when her husband Jose Tuason died in a plane crash. This left her with the responsibility of raising 7 children.

During the Martial Law established by former Philippine President Ferdinand Marcos, Tuason later settled in the United States of America. The death of her husband brought her closer with the Church and various other religious activities. Tuason is known for her religious devotion and piety which she advocates in the restoration of the Holy Rosary in common practice among Filipinos in her country. Tuason also began her own charitable foundation, called Tuason Community Center Foundation which she personally ran from 1992 to 1995. Tuason is among the top 100 list of men and women given prominent status and academic recognition in her alumni college.

== Necrological Service of Corazon Aquino ==
On August 4, 2009, Tuason gave a funeral eulogy to the deceased former Philippine President Corazon Aquino at the Cathedral-Basilica of the Immaculate Conception in Manila, Philippines. In the eulogy, Tuason noted that she and Aquino had opposing political views regarding the martial law and EDSA revolution of 1986. Tuason noted that Aquino's death on a First Saturday of the month, a pious date in reference to the Our Lady of Fatima. In the same eulogy, Tuason also mentioned Aquino's kindness when she once offered Tuason the actual rosary by Sister Lucia Santos, the Marian visionary of Our Lady of Fatima apparitions, to whom Aquino had a particular religious devotion.

== Philippine Ambassador to the Holy See ==
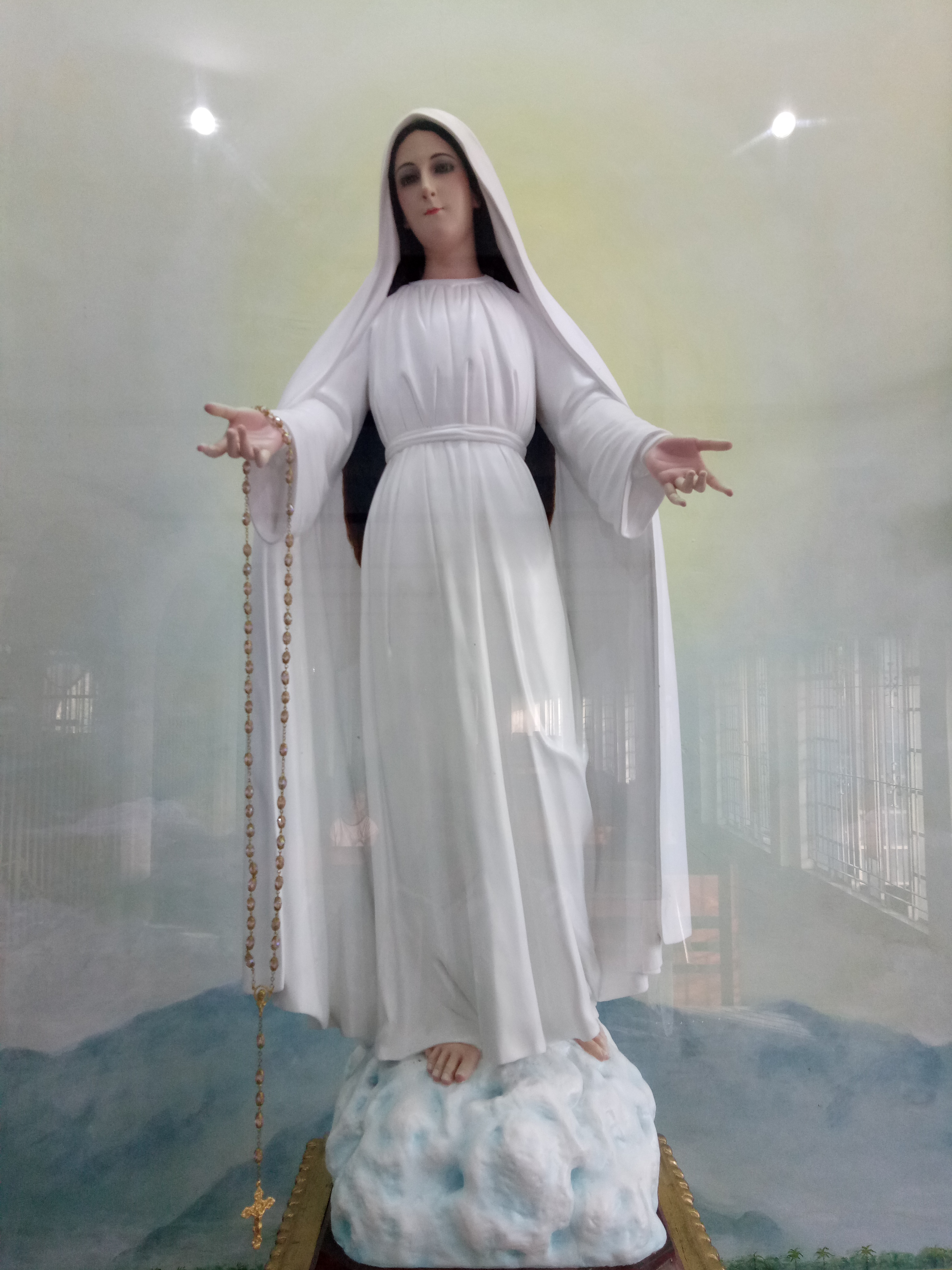
The rescued statue of Our Lady Mediatrix of All Graces, to whom Arrastia strongly advocates a devotion for.

Though Tuason was already well-acquainted with religious work since the 1980s, in 2007, Tuason became involved with the Cenacle Group, a prayer group guided by Bishop Federico Escaler. In 2007, Tuason was granted the Pax Award a title given to alumni Scholasticans for her charitable works and involvements.

On October 2, 2009, Tuason presented her diplomatic and academic credentials to Pope Benedict XVI in the summer residence of Castel Gandolfo palace as the new ambassador-extraordinary and Plenipotentiary of the Republic of the Philippines to the Holy See. Tuason also holds concurrent jurisdiction over the Sovereign Military Order of Malta as a Dame of Magistral Grace. She met with the pontiff and discussed major issues concerning Catholicism in the Philippines, more specifically the ongoing typhoon storm at the time Ketsana / Ondoy.

After presenting her credentials to Pope Benedict XVI, Tuason was escorted to the Blessed Sacrament chapel in Saint Peter's Basilica and was given the rare privilege of visiting the underground, tomb of Saint Peter.

In February 2012, Tuason obtained ecclesiastical license from the Congregation for the Causes of Saints for the relics of Saint Clare of Assisi from Foligno, Italy to tour the Philippines for the first time in 800 years.

On May 23, 2012, Tuason was awarded by the Vatican with the Order of Pius IX, Class of Dame. The former Holy See's Chief of Protocol, Archbishop Fortunatus Nwachukwu, assisted by Monsignor Guillermo Javier Karcher, 1st Class Attaché of the Secretariat of State, presented the award to Ambassador Tuason. Nwachukwu noted that Pope Benedict XVI has decided to give the award to Tuason for her "significant contributions in the advancement of bilateral relations between the Holy See and the Philippines". The award is signed by Secretary of State of the Holy See, Cardinal Tarcisio Bertone.

On May 27, 2012, Tuason became a televised speaker at the Lady of All Nations Prayer Day, held in Amsterdam, Netherlands. In her speech before 1,200 attendees, Tuason emphasized the need for devotion to the Blessed Virgin Mary and highlighted a specific Marian devotion unique to her preference, Our Lady Mediatrix of All Graces.

On August 21, 2012, in an interview at the Office of the Ambassador of the Philippines to the Vatican, Tuason noted her feelings of happiness with the upcoming canonization of Blessed Pedro Calungsod. In addition, Tuason released an official press statement for a Triduum Holy Mass beginning on October 18–20, 2012 at the Basilica of Saint Augustine, followed by another at the Church of the Gesu, and culminating in the Basilica of Saint Mary Major in Rome for various pilgrims that are coming to Rome. Tuason further noted that many Filipinos are expected to join the canonization rites, especially the Filipino bishops of the Catholic Church Tuason also noted that there are three images or statues, all contending to be chosen for the official image of Blessed Pedro Calungsod for public veneration.

On January 7, 2013, Tuason participated in the Vatican Radio show discussing the diplomatic ties of the Holy See with various global countries. In the interview, Tuason lamented the lack of religious education among the youth. In particular, Tuason noted that the world and current forms of addictive media are responsible for the introvert attitudes of Catholic youth with regards to physically engaging with others.

== Charitable Positions ==
Tuason served the following Catholic charities and secular organizations:

- Red Cross Charities 1987-1993 - Director
- Family Values Foundation of the Philippines - Treasurer
- Administrative Council of Tuason Community Center Foundation 1992-1995
- Bigay Puso (English: Give Love) Foundation - 1986
- Administrative Council of the Center for Peace - 1989
- Administrative Council of the Hero Foundation - 1990
- Administrative Council of the Evelio Javier - 1991
- Foundation of the Mission Angels - 1997
- Administrative Council of Our Lady of Mercy Halfway House Inc. - 2000
- Council of the Mission Society of the Philippines - 2002

* Council of the Crusade for the Rosary of Families - 2007 - Vice President

- Ambassador of the Republic of the Philippines to the Holy See, 2009–Present
