= Emma de Guzman =

Filipino Marian visionary

Emma C. de Guzman
- Location: Canada, Philippines
- Date: 1991-present
- Witness: various followers
- Type: Marian apparition
- Approval: Not Approved; Submitted (2010); Pending Investigation

Emma C. de Guzman (born December 8, 1949) is a Filipino Roman Catholic widow, laywoman, stigmatist and claimed Marian visionary. She is the co-founder, along with the late Sister Soledad Gaviola, of the Catholic lay group association La Pieta, dedicated to a Marian devotion under the title Mother of Love, Peace and Joy. Guzman claims to have first seen the Virgin Mary on the Feast of the Nativity of Mary in 1991.

She is reputedly notable for her alleged Marian visions under trance, particularly the golden dust (Spanish: Escarchas, English: "Frost") which allegedly manifests on her face during her trances. She claims to have communicated with Jesus Christ, the Blessed Virgin Mary, various angels and souls seeking penitence and has been observed by various high ranking Filipino Catholic prelates, recorded in photographs and on live video. The group specifically seeks to promote prayer and peace to various nations through any particular Marian devotion.

The La Pieta prayer group, along with its apparition, stigmata, and miraculous events are currently unapproved, though pending investigation by the Holy See. The group is openly tolerated and endorsed by various leading international bishops, including the former Apostolic Papal Nuncio to the Philippines, Archbishop Antonio Franco, Cardinal Jaime Lachica Sin, and Cardinal Francis Eugene George.

== History ==
Emma de Guzman was born December 8, 1949, in Cabanatuan. Widowed with three children, in 1984, she went to Singapore where she found work as a domestic. She attributes her first mystical encounter a whirlwind at a church, where a leaf landed on her foot which bore a piece of paper advertising a possible job in Ontario, Canada.

In Canada, her best friend, Sol Gaviola, had organized a pilgrimage to the Fatima Shrine in Youngstown, New York, in 1991, and took her along. Emma mentioned that the Virgin Mary taught her how to pray the Holy Rosary, and requested her numerous times to pray them over, and over again through the course of three successive nights. In addition, she claims that the Virgin Mary emphatically immersed Emma's emotions through the various mysteries of the Rosary as if she were actually living each decade.

Emma claims to have met Jesus Christ on two separate occasions. The first occasion was in the old chapel of Our Lady of Fatima in Youngstown, New York, under the guise of an old man. The second occasion was during a trance, to which she claims that Jesus directed her to a copy of the New Testament of the Bible. Many of Emma's followers during her Wednesday group meetings attested to the fragrances and oils which seeped out of religious statues in the home.

In 2009, a letter was circulated by unknown parties, claiming the Virgin Mary predicted the results of the upcoming presidential election in the Philippines.

=== Description of the Virgin ===
According to de Guzman, the Blessed Virgin Mary wears a full white tunic and has a yellow golden sash and a golden-bordered veil surrounded by light. A statue specific to Guzman's description was made for Marian veneration.

According to Emma de Guzman, the Blessed Virgin Mary has only chosen to appear to her annually on two specific dates, the Nativity of Mary (September 8) and the Feast of the Immaculate Conception (December 8) which also coincides with Emma's birthday. An exception occurred in December 2009, when Emma refused to broadcast the message she had allegedly received to the public. She also notes that the Virgin Mary does not arrive immediately, but is first introduced by singing angels.

=== Mountain of Salvation ===
Members of the La Pieta Group asked the Archbishop of Batangas Ramon Arguelles permission to pray at the mountains, and requested a Holy Mass, both of which were authorized by the Archbishop. The mountainous site of the apparition was later referred The Mountain of Salvation by de Guzman. Two locations were chosen by de Guzman, Cebu and Batangas, which were land donations from her benefactors. The group also has non-Filipino members, especially among American, Canadian, Polish, and Dutch devotees who travel to the shrine to witness the alleged Marian apparition.

== Miraculous claims ==
=== Manifestation of facial golden dust ===
According to an Action News 3 New York documentary on Emma's claims of apparition, belief in golden glitters during apparitions date back to 1917, and are commonly referred to as Escarchas. After obtaining samples of Emma's collected gold dust and compared them to common glitter found in holy cards, electron analysis showed no difference between the two materials yet Emma's golden dust remained the same when exposed to high contents of Hydrochloric acid. Followers of Emma maintains that the glitters appear mysteriously on her face during trances, as recorded in various video recordings. Furthermore, the golden dust collectively amounts on its own, saved on a white sheet where de Guzman sits during her apparition.

=== Bodily removal of roses ===
On November 4, 1995, during one of Emma's trances to which she allegedly claims to experience the Passion of Jesus Christ, Emma drew out five small, thornless, rose buds out of her chest, filled with blood and bodily mucus. Later accounts of the videotaped event claims a hole on her chest, which later closed.

=== Writings in ancient Koine Greek ===
Followers of Emma also attest to her various letters written in Ancient Greek, containing scriptural passages of the Gospel of Saint John, written under trance. In 2006, Witnesses claim that while Emma was being dictated to write on paper, her eyeline sight was elevated into the ceiling not looking into the writing pad, yet still continued to write a foreign language, in perfect straight lining on paper. Emma claims the writings were given by Saint John the Evangelist, and that she has no previous education in Ancient Greek or any other language, as well as doctrinal or theological knowledge of anything she has written down. At the time of the event, Emma did not have full proficiency in the English language.

A Catholic priest, Father Renato Lopez, reviewed the actual physical letter and ruled that the language in which Emma wrote down was not Classical Greek but Koine Greek, remaining faithful to the timeline in which the Gospel of Saint John could possibly have been originally recorded.

Furthermore, the content of the Gospel of Saint John written down by Emma in Koine Greek refers to the first letter of Saint John, chapter 4:1 which pertains to a warning not to quickly believe any spirit or seer which claims to be from God but rather seek true discernment through prayer.

=== Mediatrix ===
In September 2012, the Feast of the Nativity of Mary, Emma stated that the Blessed Virgin Mary revealed her maternal role as Mediatrix before the Mediator, a special Marian title associated by many Filipino Catholics as in reference to Our Lady Mediatrix of All Graces.

=== Partial stigmata ===
Video recordings of Emma's partial stigmata manifesting include: forehead wounds, back scourging, palms, and foot.

=== Encounter with purgatorian souls ===
Emma has also claimed to have met with souls from Purgatory, brought by Saint Magdalena of Pazzi, requesting prayers for the liberation of their souls under the penalty of Seraphic fire.

=== Encounter with female saints ===
Emma claims to have either seen and/or conversed with Saint Bernadette Soubirous, Saint Teresa of Avila, and Saint Faustina Kowalska.

== Opposition to the RH bill ==
Emma de Guzman, a devout Catholic, publicly opposes the passage of the Reproductive Health bill in the Philippines. On December 8, 2008, she claimed that the Blessed Virgin Mary wept and rebuked politicians and laypersons who do not respect the sanctity of life, as well as to warn that the Reproductive Health Bill as a law will bring forward the suffering and destruction of many souls. In addition, she also opposes the use of contraception and abortion among her followers.

== Church position ==
=== Ecclesiastical endorsement ===
Emma de Guzman is known for receiving approbations from various notable Roman Catholic clerics, namely the former Apostolic Papal Nuncio to the Philippines, Archbishop Antonio Franco, Cardinal Jaime Lachica Sin, Cardinal Francis Eugene George, Bishop James Michael Moynihan, Monsignor John Canary, the Vicar-General of the Archdiocese of Chicago.

In a circular dated November 18, 2004, the Roman Catholic Diocese of Kalookan, authorised by Bishop Deogracias Iñiguez granted an official Imprimatur on the La Pieta house prayer booklet, along with its religious Marian hymns.

On December 2, 2012, the statue of "Our Mother of Love, Peace and Joy" endorsed by de Guzman was featured in the Intramuros Grand Marian Procession, a religious Catholic event sponsored by the Cofradia de la Inmaculada Concepcion and Archdiocese of Manila.

=== Investigation by the Holy See ===
Various materials and correspondence were submitted to the Holy See in 2010 for further research and investigation. The prayer group, La Pieta House of Prayer, declines to provide any information regarding its submission, contents and correspondence to the general public. The apostolate group claims full obeisance to the Roman Catholic Church and its verdict on the recorded apparitions.

== See also ==
- Marian Apparitions
