= Teresita Castillo =

20th and 21st-century Filipino visionary

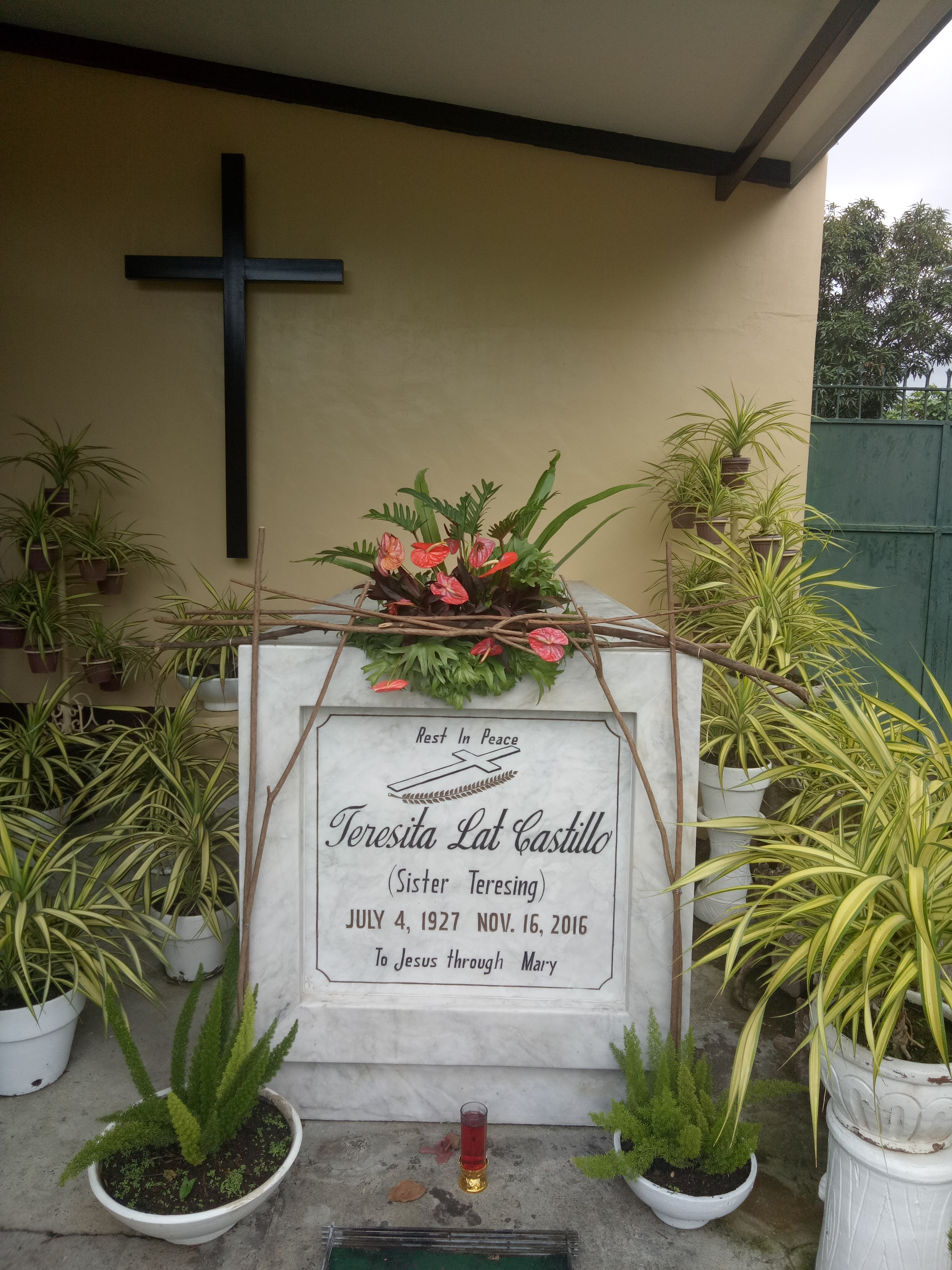
Tomb of Teresita Castillo at the Carmelite Convent in Lipa

Teresita Castillo (4 July 1927 – 16 November 2016) was a Filipina Catholic who said she had Marian visions. Castillo was a postulant of the Discalced Carmelites in the late 1940s but could not stay in the convent due to the controversies surrounding the apparitions in Lipa, Batangas, Philippines, in the year 1948.

An initial investigation report in 1951 was signed by six Filipino bishops and declared the Lipa apparitions as "non-supernatural". Pope Pius XII in 1951 decreed her claims of apparition as both fraudulent and non-supernatural. The apparitions were initially approved by the local bishop in 1951 but later condemned by the Vatican in the same year. In 2015, then-Lipa Archbishop Ramon Arguelles declared the apparitions as supernatural and worthy of belief, but the Vatican overruled his decision. In 2016 the Vatican reiterated the judgement on the said apparitions as non-supernatural in character. Since this has been established as non-supernatural by the Holy See, the current local ordinary can no longer rule on the authenticity of the said apparitions. CIC 333, cited in the 2015 Decree, indicates that this decision is no longer appealable. In 2016, the Congregation of the Doctrine of the Faith referred to the decision of Pope Pius XII as final.

== Life ==
Castillo came from an educated and religious family that may have influenced her interest in religious works. She was the youngest of seven children of the former Governor of Batangas, Modesto Castillo. At the time of the apparitions, Castillo's father was judge of the Court of Industrial Relations. The Castillos were very influential in Batangas province, Philippines.

Castillo celebrated her 21st birthday by "escaping" early in the morning at five from her father's house without permission to enter the Carmelite convent of Lipa. Her entrance into the Carmel was not well received initially by the family, who tried all means to get her back. Castillo steadfastly refused to return home. Castillo died in November 2016, aged 89.

== Marian apparitions (1948) ==
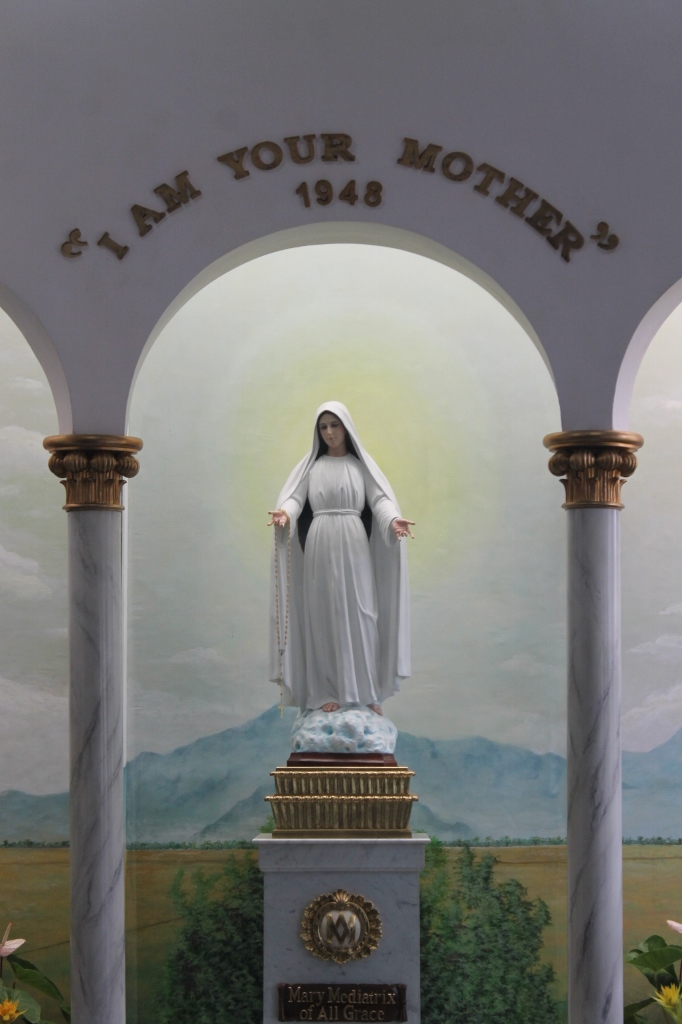
Our Lady, Mediatrix of all graces

Castillo, in the reinvestigations of 1991 documents formally submitted to the Holy Office, reconfirmed that she encountered the Devil and was heavily tortured under demonic affliction. She claimed that around 5 p.m. on September 12, 1948, the Feast of the Most Holy Name of the Blessed Virgin Mary, she saw a vine in the garden shake though there was no wind at all. A woman's voice told her to kiss the ground and return for fifteen consecutive days.

The next day, September 13, Monday, again at five in the afternoon, Castillo returned to the place, knelt down and intended to say the Hail Mary. She had only reached the words "full of grace" when again the vine moved. A beautiful lady appeared, a golden rosary hanging on her right hand. The lady's dress was simple and pure white, held at the waist by a narrow cloth belt. Her feet were bare and resting on clouds about two feet above the ground.

On Tuesday, September 14, the first shower of rose petals took place. Some nuns found fresh rose petals of exceptional sweetness strewn around their rooms or outside their doors. Meantime, the prioress, Mary Cecilia of Jesus, decided to consult Alfredo Obviar, auxiliary bishop of Lipa and spiritual director of Carmel. The bishop instructed her to tell Castillo to ask the Blessed Virgin for some proof that the apparition was from heaven. Days after the first shower of petals, total blindness afflicted the postulant. The prioress heard a voice telling her that the only way Castillo's blindness would be healed was for her to kiss the eyes of the postulant. So, one day in the presence of Obviar, the prioress lifted the veil of Castillo and imparted a kiss on her eyes. Instantly, Castillo's blindness was cured. Obviar doubted no more that the apparitions were heavenly.

In her last apparition to Castillo, the Blessed Virgin identified herself: "I am the Mediatrix of all graces" Reportedly, many conversions and healings occurred.

The stress from the investigation resulted in a long illness for Castillo, who eventually had to voluntarily leave the convent as she failed to complete the required length of stay for a novice. She later assisted in compiling and transcribing an English-Tagalog dictionary. The prioress of the convent, Mary Cecilia of Jesus, was sent to another convent.

On 22 January 1951, Auxiliary Bishop Obviar, the spiritual director of Carmel Lipa, was installed as Apostolic Administrator of the new Diocese of Lucena.

== Reception ==
Initially, permission to venerate Mary under the title of Our Lady, Mediatrix of all graces was granted by then Bishop Alfred Versoza. In 1951 the Philippine church hierarchy declared that there was no supernatural intervention in the reported happenings in Lipa. Verzosa's successor, the apostolic administrator Rufino Santos, ordered that no petals be given to anyone by the Lipa Carmelite community and the statue of Our Lady, Mediatrix, be withdrawn from public view.

Verzosa, who allowed the apparitions to be publicised and for the Mediatrix to be venerated, was stripped of all administrative duties, remaining a bishop in name only. Though he had used his family's wealth to rebuild the churches and schools of war-torn Lipa, he was accused of mishandling the war reparations and finances of the diocese. He lived in exile at his Vigan home, reduced to rolling tobacco leaves to augment the family income. In January 2013 Cardinal Gaudencio Rosales, Archbishop Emeritus of Manila, opened the diocesan process of the cause of beatification and canonization of Verzosa.

In 1992, Archbishop Mariano Gaviola granted permission to once again display the image of Our Lady, Mediatrix of all graces. In November 2009, Gaviola's successor, Archbishop Ramon Arguelles, created a commission to conduct a new investigation into the apparitions. In an interview, Arguelles said that the "Mediatrix phenomenon is the greatest thing that has ever happened to the church of Lipa". He also mentioned the fervor of the faithful of the diocese and "friendly pressure to declare the apparitions authentic".

The Carmelite convent in Lipa, the site of the reported apparitions, is the subject of major pilgrimages in the Philippines, one attended by the president of the Philippines.

According to a new decree dated September 12, 2015, Arguelles approved the apparitions as "supernatural in character and worthy of belief" – the apparitions to Teresita Castillo.

However, in May 2016, the Congregation of the Doctrine of the Faith under Cardinal Gerhard Ludwig Müller overruled the archbishop and rejected his 2012 decree declaring that the apparitions in Batangas in 1948 were not authentic. Argüelles himself disclosed the ruling by the CDF in an archdiocesan communiqué on May 31. In its decree, the Congregation stated that Pope Pius XII had made a definitive confirmation in 1951 against the supposed apparitions, declaring that they "were not of supernatural origin", which the local authority had no authority to overrule.
