= Alfredo Obviar =

Filipino bishop and Venerable

Venerable Alfredo Obviar
- Titular Bishop of Linoë; Bishop Emeritus of Lucena
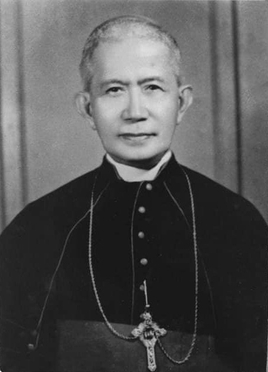
- Photograph of Bishop Alfredo Obviar
- Church: Catholic Church
- Metropolis: Lucena
- Diocese: Diocese of Lucena
- See: Lucena
- Appointed: 4 November 1950
- In office: 15 March 1951 until 25 September 1976
- Predecessor: Position established
- Successor: Jose Tomas Sanchez
- Previous posts: Parish priest of Immaculate Conception Parish (Malvar, Batangas) and Cathedral Parish of St. Sebastian (Lipa City) Auxiliary Bishop of Lipa

Orders
- Ordination: 15 March 1919 by Alfredo Versoza
- Consecration: 29 June 1944 by Guglielmo Piani
- Rank: Bishop

Personal details
- Born: Alfredo María Obviar y Aranda; 29 August 1889 Lipa, Batangas, Captaincy General of the Philippines
- Died: 1 October 1978 (aged 89) Lucena, Philippines
- Buried: Missionary Catechists of Saint Thérèse of the Infant Jesus Compound, Tayabas, Quezon, Philippines
- Denomination: Catholicism
- Motto: Faciem tuam, Domine, requiram ('Your Face, O Lord, I seek', Psalm 27:8)
- Coat of arms

Styles of Alfredo Obviar
- Reference style: The Most Reverend
- Spoken style: Your Excellency
- Religious style: Bishop
- Posthumous style: Venerable

Alfredo María Obviar y Aranda (29 August 1889 – 1 October 1978) was a Filipino prelate of the Catholic Church and the founder of the Congregation of the Missionary Catechists of Saint Thérèse of the Infant Jesus. He was Bishop of Lucena until his death. His beatification process was opened in 2001 and Obviar was declared venerable by Pope Francis in 2018.

== Early life ==
Alfredo María Obviar y Aranda was born on 29 August 1889 in Mataás na Lupa, Lipa, Batangas to Telesforo Obviar and Florentina Catalina Aranda. He became an orphan at the early age, and was put under the care of his relatives from his mother's side.

Obviar received his early religious instruction at the college of St. Francis Xavier in Manila run by the Society of Jesus, where he graduated in 1901. He earned his degree in Bachelor of Arts at Ateneo de Manila in 1914, and proceeded to the University of Santo Tomas Pontifical Seminary for his theological studies.

Obviar received the sacerdotal ordination on 15 March 1919. His pastoral ministry began that same year at Luta (now Malvar, Batangas) and he continued as vicar of the cathedral-parish in Lipa from 1927 to 1944. In both parishes, he established catechetical centers in the población and the barrios. He was also Vicar General for the Diocese of Lipa, and was appointed confessor and chaplain of the Carmelite monastery of Lipa.

== Religious life ==
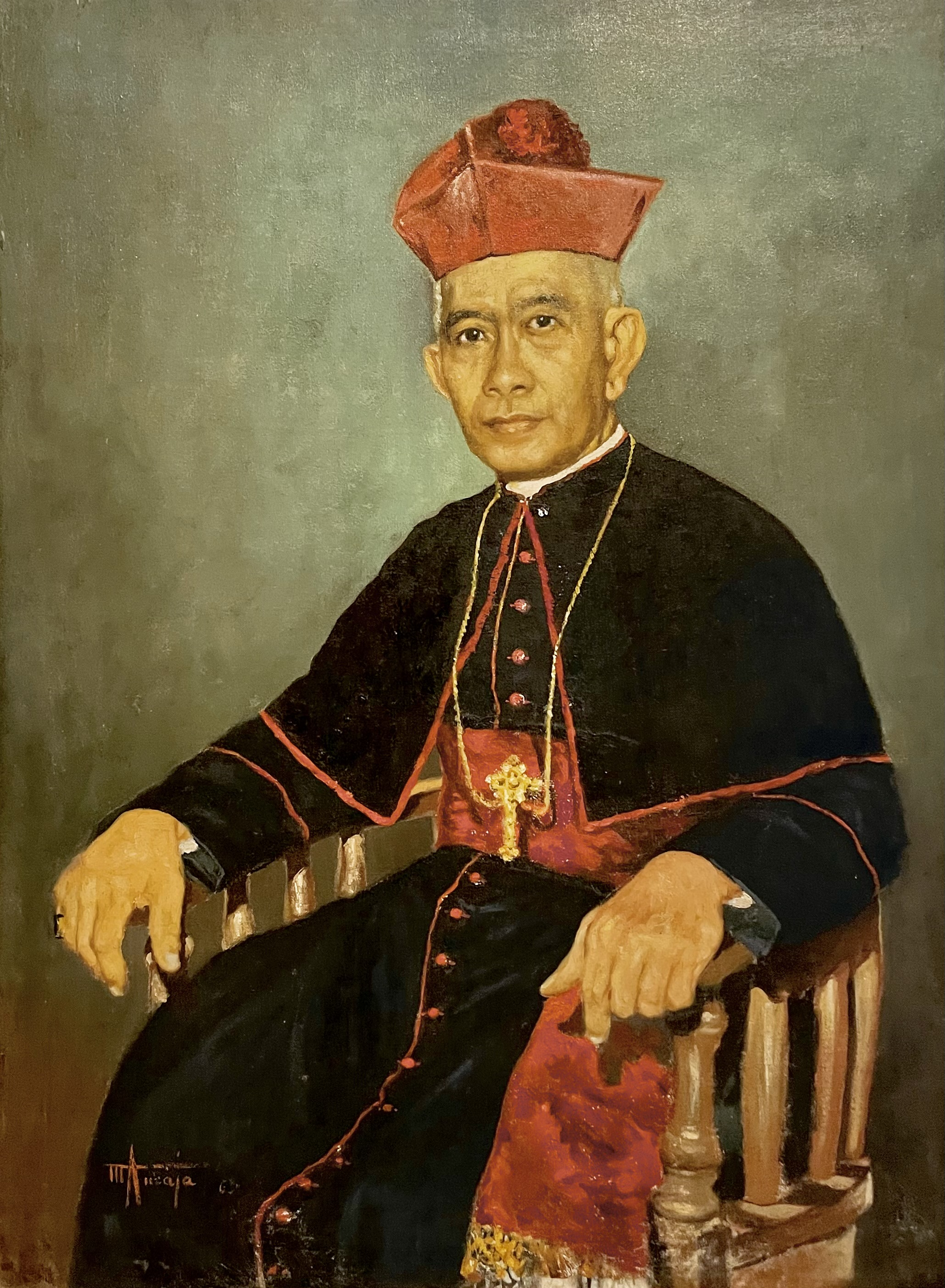
Venerable Alfredo Maria Obviar

On March 11, 1944, Obviar was appointed the first auxiliary bishop of Lipa and titular bishop of Linoë, Turkey. He was subsequently ordained to the episcopate on 29 June 1944, with the Apostolic delegate to the Philippines, Archbishop Guglielmo Piani, as principal consecrator, with Pedro Paulo Santos, Bishop of Caceres, and Cesar Maria Guerrero, auxiliary bishop of Manila as co-consecrators.

On 22 January 1951, Obviar was installed as Apostolic administrator of the new Diocese of Lucena. Motivated by his great work for catechesis, he founded the Missionary Catechists of St. Therese (MCST) on August 12, 1958. He established the Missionary Catechists of Saint Thérèse of the Infant Jesus (MCST), with the help of Mother Mercy Medenilla, who became the first superior of the MCST, and has four other women. The earliest monastic MCST was founded in San Narciso, Quezon.

To compensate for the shortage of priests in the new diocese, Obviar also founded the Our Lady of the Most Holy Seminary which was later renamed as Our Lady of Mount Carmel Seminary, a minor seminary in Sariaya, Quezon. Decades after, a major seminary was founded by the Diocese of Lucena re-institutionalizing the name Our Lady of the Most Holy Rosary Seminary. The establishment of this increased the number of priests attending from 1951 to 1975. In the year of his retirement, it had increased by more than 100 priests. Obviar ordained Ricardo Jamin Vidal to the priesthood on St. Patrick's Day, 17 March 1956, in Lucena; Vidal would later become a cardinal and Archbishop Emeritus of the Archdiocese of Cebu.

From 11 October 1962 to 8 December 1962, Obviar was a Council Father at the first session of the Second Vatican Council.

After more than 18 years as administrator, Obviar was declared the first diocesan bishop of the Diocese of Lucena on July 15, 1969. He served as Bishop of Lucena until his retirement in 1976.

== Death ==
Obviar died at the age of 89, in Lucena on 1 October 1978, on the feast of his patron saint Thérèse of the Child Jesus.

== Beatification process ==
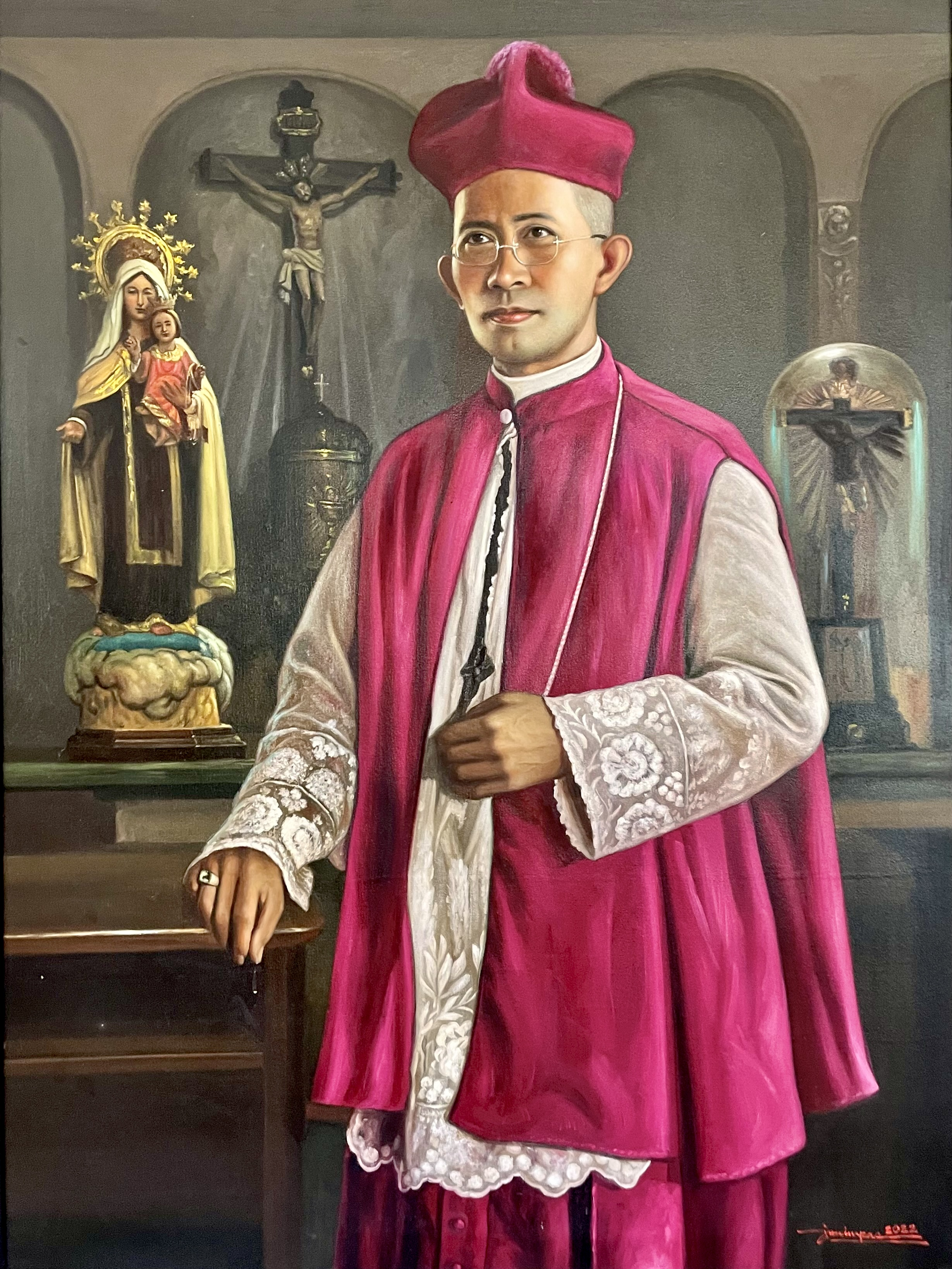
Official Portrait of Venerable Alfredo Maria Obviar

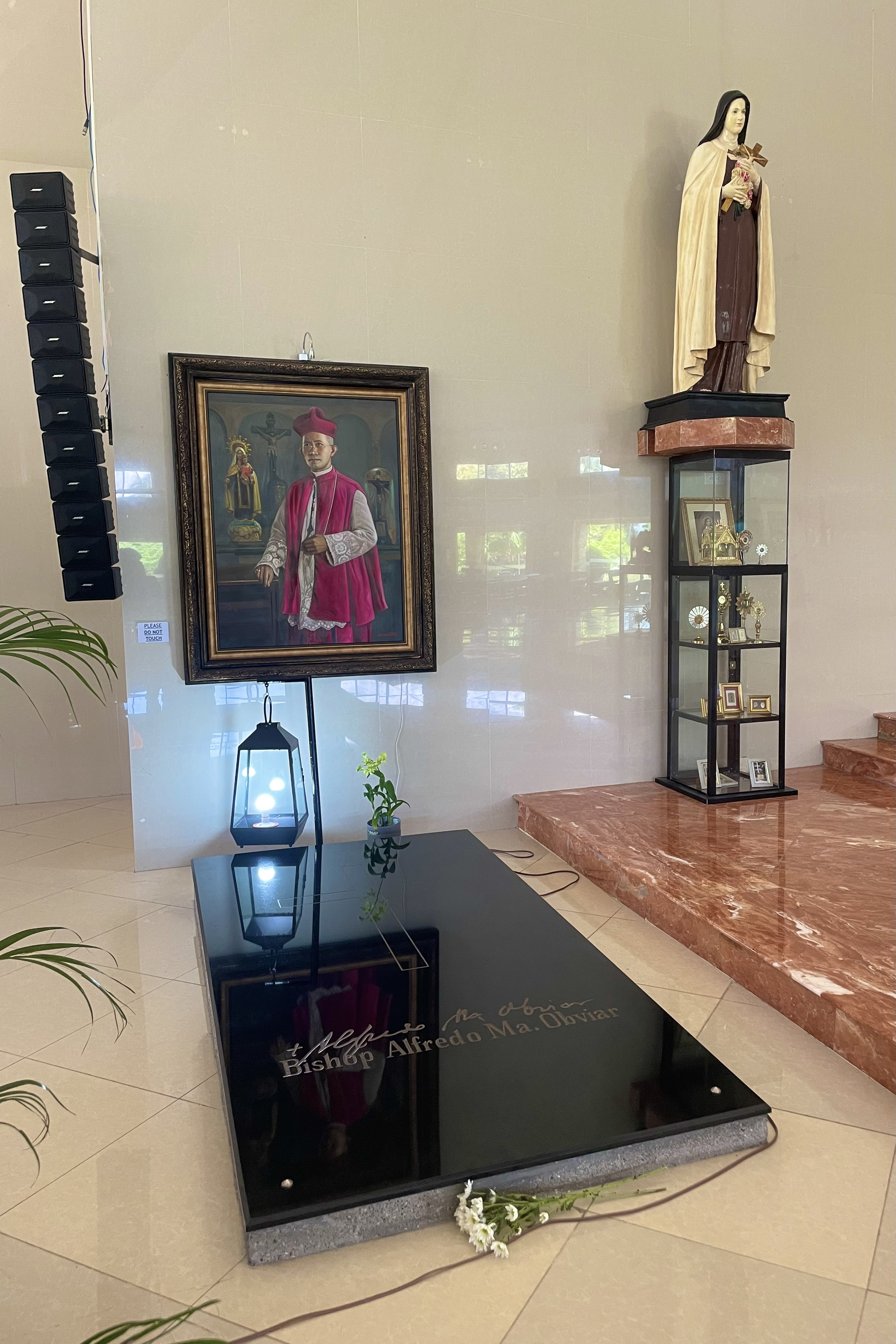
Tomb of Venerable Alfredo Maria Obviar

The beatification process was opened in 2001, Obviar was declared Servant of God in 2005. Pope Francis named him as venerable on 7 November 2018.

== See also ==
- List of Filipinos venerated in the Catholic Church
