= 2010 in the Philippines =

- Decades: 1990s; 2000s; 2010s; 2020s
- See also: List of years in the Philippines; films; music; television; sports

2010 in the Philippines details events of note that happened in the Philippines in 2010.

== Incumbents ==
Benigno S.
Aquino III

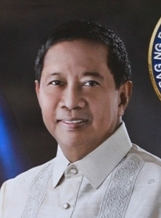
Jejomar C.
Binay Sr.

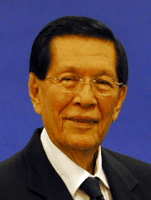
Juan Ponce F. Enrile

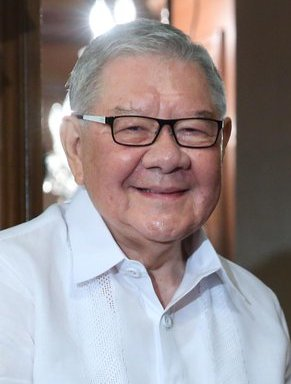
Feliciano R.
Belmonte Jr.

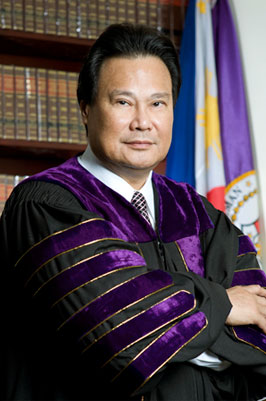
Renato
C. Corona

- President:
  - Gloria Macapagal Arroyo (Lakas-Kampi-CMD) (until June 30)
  - Benigno Aquino III (Liberal) (starting June 30)
- Vice President:
  - Noli de Castro (Independent) (until June 30)
  - Jejomar Binay (PDP-Laban) (starting June 30)
- Senate President: Juan Ponce Enrile
- House Speaker:
  - Prospero Nograles (until June 30)
  - Feliciano Belmonte, Jr. (starting July 26)
- Chief Justice:
  - Reynato Puno (until May 17)
  - Renato Corona (starting May 17)
- Philippine Congress:
  - 14th Congress of the Philippines (until June 4)
  - 15th Congress of the Philippines (starting July 26)

== Events ==
=== January ===
- January 5 – Senator Panfilo Lacson leaves the Philippines, shortly before charges against him were filed for being the alleged mastermind in the murder of publicist Bubby Dacer and his driver Emmanuel Corbito as claimed by former policeman Cezar Mancao.
- January 14 – Dr. Mercedes B. Concepcion and Dr. Ernesto O. Domingo were conferred the title and rank of National Scientist for Demography and Internal Medicine, respectively.

=== February ===
- February 2 – Biñan becomes a component city in the province of Laguna through ratification of Republic Act 9740.

=== March ===
- March 4 – National Scientist Lourdes J. Cruz is recognized as one of the five laureates of L'Oreal-UNESCO Awards for Women in Science for the discovery of conotoxins produced by certain marine snails that can serve as painkillers and pharmaceutical probes to study brain function.

=== May ===
- May 10 – Automated elections, first implemented in the Philippines two years earlier with August 11, 2008 Autonomous Region in Muslim Mindanao (ARMM) election, used on 2010 Philippine general election after its preparations from 2009 to 2010 following the usage of the computerized system at ARMM, making it the first at national level and second in the country overall.

=== June ===
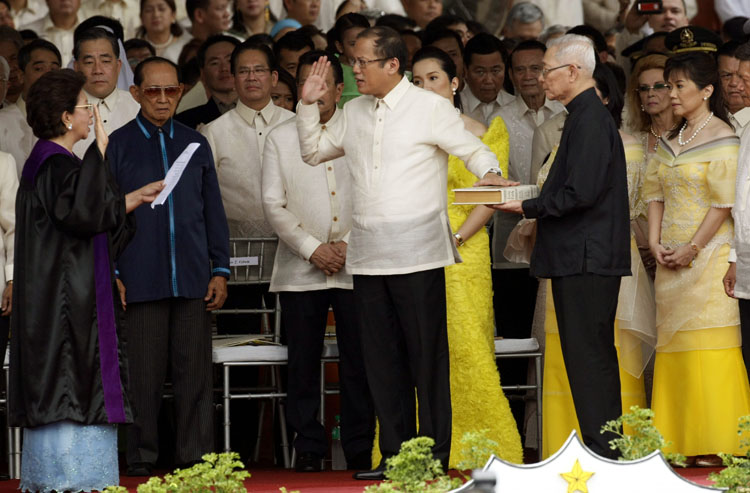
Benigno S. Aquino III taking his oath of office as the 15th President of the Philippines.

- June 13 – Thomas S. Monson dedicates the Cebu City Philippines Temple.
- June 30 – Benigno S. Aquino III is inaugurated as the 15th President of the Philippines at the Quirino Grandstand.

=== July ===
- July 14 – Typhoon Conson, locally known as Basyang, hits Metro Manila.
- July 26 – President Benigno S. Aquino III delivers his first State of the Nation Address (SONA).

=== August ===
- August 2 – Ivan Padilla, leader of a notorious carjacking group, is killed following a shootout with law enforcers in Makati.
- August 18 – A bus bound for La Union plunges into a 150-foot deep ravine in Sablan, Benguet, killing 42 passengers and injured 9 others including the driver and the conductor.

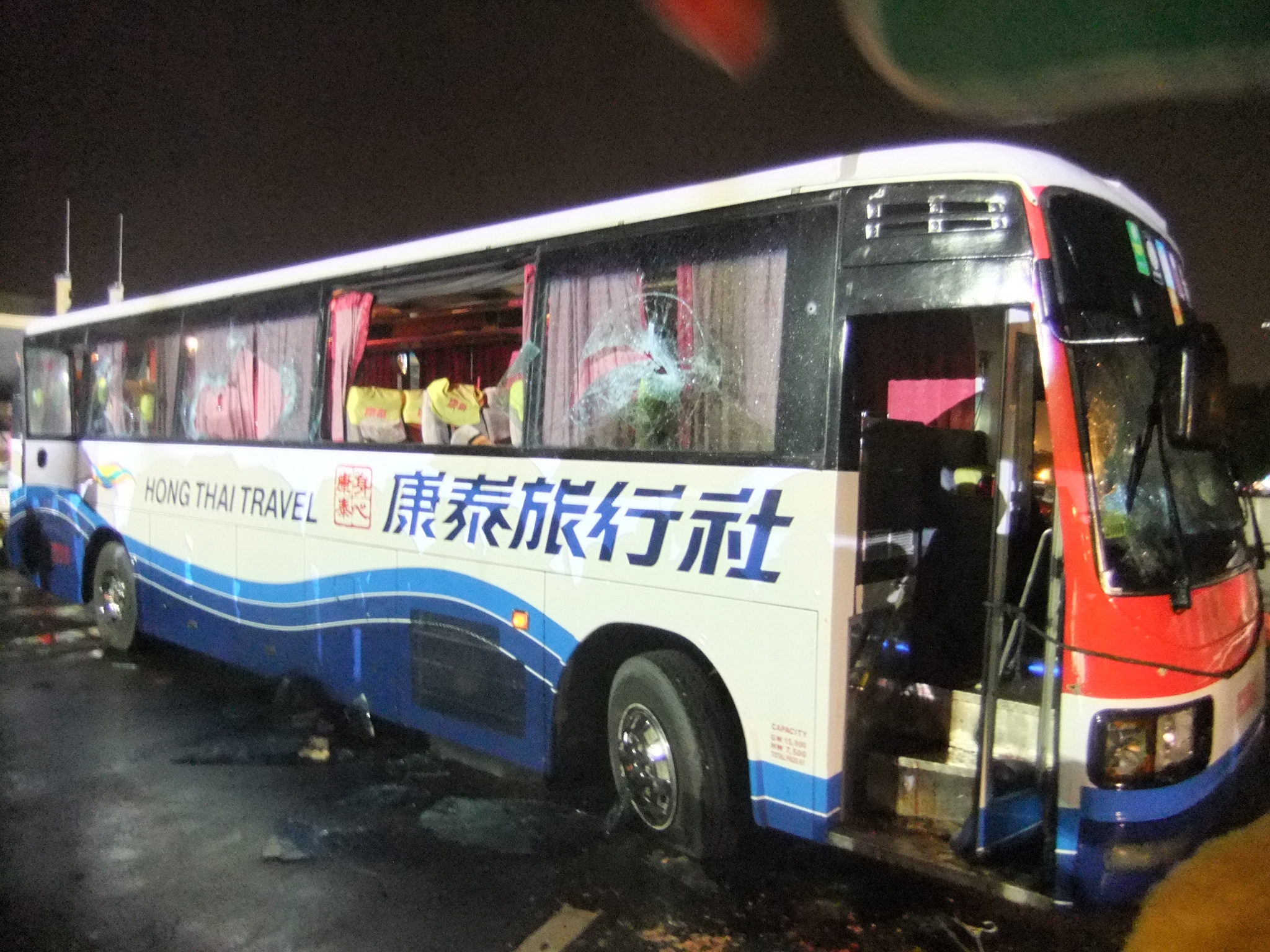
The bus of 2010 Manila hostage crisis

- August 23:
  - Hostage-taking incident in Quirino Grandstand. This incident causes the straining of ties between Hong Kong and the Philippines.
  - The Supreme Court reinstates its November 18, 2008 ruling which declared unconstitutional the cityhood laws of Baybay, Leyte; Bogo, Cebu; Catbalogan, Samar; Tandag, Surigao del Sur; Lamitan, Basilan; Borongan, Eastern Samar; Tayabas, Quezon; Tabuk, Kalinga; Bayugan, Agusan del Sur; Batac, Ilocos Norte; Mati, Davao Oriental; Guihulngan, Negros Oriental; Cabadbaran, Agusan del Norte; El Salvador, Misamis Oriental; Carcar, Cebu and Naga, Cebu causing these cities to become regular municipalities again.
- August 31 – Filipino physicists Christopher Bernido and Ma. Victoria Carpio-Bernido are among this year's recipients of the Ramon Magsaysay Awards.

=== September ===
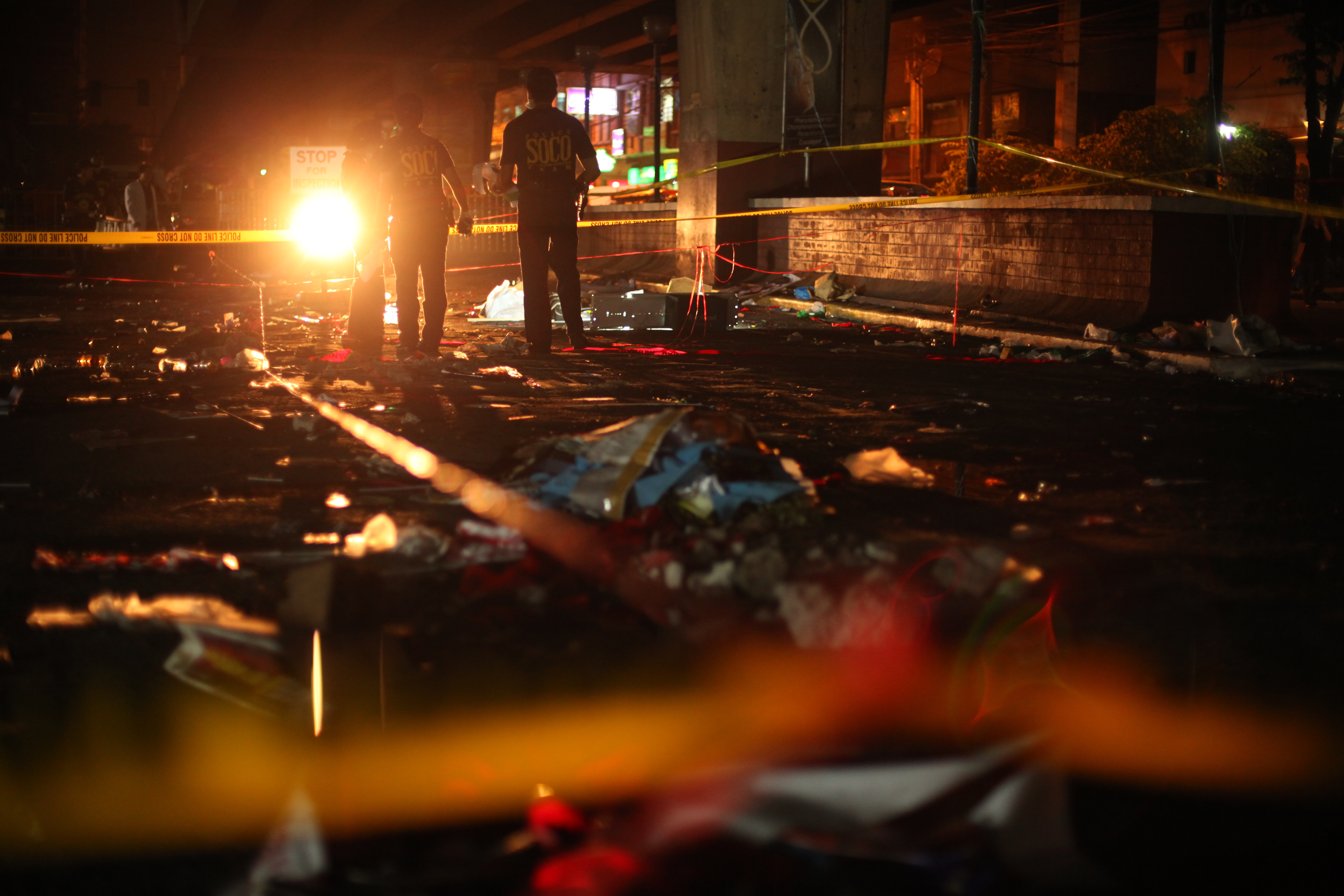
Site of the 2010 Bar Exam Blast

- September 26 – An explosion rocks the De La Salle University in Manila during the last day of the 2010 Bar Exams.
- September 30 – Activist, artist and tour guide Carlos Celdran is arrested for shouting and bearing a sign with the word "Dámaso" at the Manila Cathedral during an ecumenical service, to protest the bishops' stance against abortion and contraception.

=== October ===
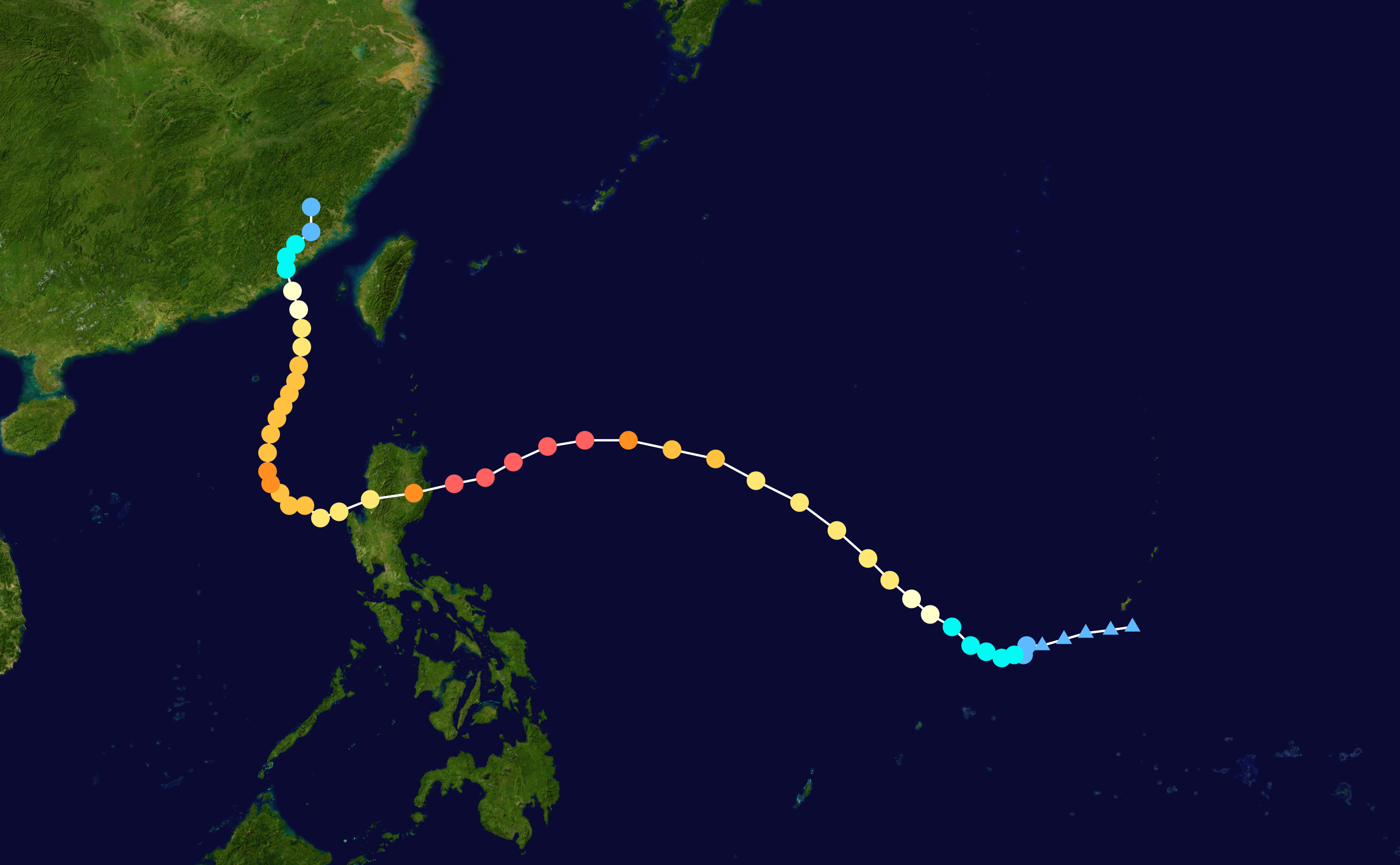
Track of Typhoon Megi (Juan)

- October 18 – Typhoon Megi, locally known as Juan, hits northern Luzon. It was among the most intense tropical cyclones ever recorded.
- October 25 – Barangay and Sangguniang Kabataan (SK) elections are held in the Philippines.

=== November ===
- November 23 – Department of Tourism (DOT) Undersecretary Vicente Romano III officially resigns his post, as a result of a controversial tourism promotion campaign called "Pilipinas Kay Ganda".
- November 15 - the killing of Leonard Co, Sofronio Cortez, and Julius Borromeo in Kananga, Leyte by elements of the 19th Infantry Battalion of the Armed Forces of the Philippines' 8th Infantry Division
- November 30 – Former policeman Gerardo Biong, convicted in the Vizconde massacre case, is freed after 15 years of imprisonment. Biong is found guilty of burning bedsheets and tampering with other evidence in the crime.

=== December ===
- December 6 – The Department of Interior and Local Government (DILG) creates a tracker team to hunt down Senator Panfilo Lacson. The team was composed of members of the Philippine National Police (PNP) and the National Bureau of Investigation (NBI).
- December 7 – The Supreme Court (SC) declares as "unconstitutional" Executive Order No. 1, creating the Truth Commission. The Philippine Truth Commission was created by President Benigno Aquino III and tasked to investigate cases of graft and corruption during the Arroyo administration.
- December 10 – President Aquino III orders the release of "Morong 43" (43 health workers arrested as suspected communist rebels in February 2010), saying their rights were violated.
- December 14 – Hubert Webb and six other convicted in the Vizconde massacre case are acquitted by the Supreme Court, based primarily on inconsistent testimonies of witness Jessica Alfaro during trial.
- December 16 – The Bangko Sentral ng Pilipinas (Central Bank of the Philippines) released the New Generation Currency Series banknotes to the public three years after the project and process for New Design Series (NDS) demonetization and NGC print run were started in 2007 and November 2010, respectively. The series was approved by Presidents Gloria Macapagal Arroyo and her immediate successor Benigno Aquino III, making the only banknote series to be approved by two presidents.
- December 20 – After seven years in detention, Senator Antonio Trillanes IV is released from jail.

== Holidays ==
On December 11, 2009, Republic Act No. 9849 declared Eidul Adha as a regular holiday. Also amending Executive Order No. 292, also known as The Administrative Code of 1987, the following are regular and special days shall be observed. The EDSA Revolution Anniversary was proclaimed since 2002 as a special nonworking holiday. On February 25, 2004, Republic Act No. 9256 declared every August 21 as a special nonworking holiday to be known as Ninoy Aquino Day. Note that in the list, holidays in bold are "regular holidays" and those in italics are "nationwide special days".

- January 1 – **New Year's Day**
- February 25 – EDSA Revolution Anniversary
- April 1 – **Maundy Thursday**
- April 2 – **Good Friday**
- April 9 – **Araw ng Kagitingan** (Day of Valor)
- May 1 – **Labor Day**
- June 12 – **Independence Day**
- August 21 – Ninoy Aquino Day
- August 29 – **National Heroes Day**
- September 9 – **Eidul Fitr**
- November 1 – All Saints Day
- November 15 – **Eid al-Adha**
- November 30 – **Bonifacio Day**
- December 25 – **Christmas Day**
- December 30 – **Rizal Day**
- December 31 – Last Day of the Year

In addition, several other places observe local holidays, such as the foundation of their town. These are also "special days."

== Television ==
- August 24 – Venus Raj is placed fourth runner up in the 2010 Miss Universe pageant.

== Films ==
Highest grossing Filipino films for the year.

Rank	Title	Film Outfit	Gross
1	My Amnesia Girl	Star Cinema	₱144.8 million
2	Miss You Like Crazy	Star Cinema	₱143.25 million
3	Here Comes The Bride	Star Cinema, OctoArts Films & Quantum Films	₱116 million
4	Petrang Kabayo	Viva Films	₱115.2 million
5	You To Me Are Everything	Regal Films and GMA Films	₱102.42 million
6	Babe, I Love You	Star Cinema and VIVA Films	₱96.34 million
7	Si Agimat at Si Enteng Kabisote	GMA Films, MZet Productions, OctoArts Films, Imus Productions, APT Entertainment	₱86.7 million
8	Paano Na Kaya	Star Cinema	₱82.25 million
9	Hating Kapatid	Viva Films	₱81.97 million
10	Ang Tanging Ina Mo (Last na 'To!)	Star Cinema	67.9 million

Released	Title	Directed by	Cast	Film Outfit	Genre
January 27	Paano Na Kaya	Ruel S Bayani	Kim Chiu, Gerald Anderson, Melissa Ricks	Star Cinema	Romantic comedy
February 17	Marino	Paul Sta Ana	Allen Dizon, Ara Mina, Bangs Garcia, Krista Ranillo	CDP Events & Entertainment Production and ATD Entertainment Production	Drama
February 17	Ben & Sam	Mark Shandii Bacolod	Ray An Dulay, Jess Mendoza	Ignatius Film Productions	LGBT
February 24	Miss You Like Crazy	Cathy Garcia Molina	Bea Alonzo, John Lloyd Cruz, Maricar Reyes	Star Cinema	Drama
February 26	Pitas	Joey Romero	Sid Lucero, Kristel Moreno, Bembol Roco, Rio Locsin	Legaslas Entertainment	Drama
March 10	The Red Shoes	Raul Jorolan	Nikki Gil, Marvin Agustin	Unitel Production	Romantic Drama
March 10	Bakal Boys	Ralston Jover	Gina Pareño	Apogee Productions	Drama
March 10	Parisukat	Jonison Fontanos	Toffee Calma, Jeff Tatsuro	Ignatius Films	LGBT
March 17	Santuaryo	Monti Parungao	Basti Romero, Justin Dizon, Nicos Bacani, Gino Quintana, A.J. Ona and Ralph Mateo	Climax Productions	LGBT, Thriller
March 22	Romeo & Juliet	Adolfo B Alix Jr	Alessandra De Rossi	Kisapmata Productions	Drama
April 3	Babe, I Love You	Mae Czarina Cruz	Anne Curtis, Sam Milby	Star Cinema and VIVA Films	Romance
April 21	Working Girls	Jose Javier Reyes	Eugene Domingo, Ruffa Gutierrez, Bianca King, Cristine Reyes, Iza Calzado, Jennylyn Mercado, Eula Valdez	GMA Films, VIVA Films and Unitel Pictures	Comedy
April 28	D'Survivors	Adolfo B Alix Jr	Rocky Salumbides, Daniel Matsunaga, K Brosas, Akihiro Sato, Fabio Ide	Astral Productions	Comedy
May 5	You To Me Are Everything	Mark Reyes	Marian Rivera and Dingdong Dantes	Regal Films and GMA Films	romantic comedy
May 7	Pulupot	Monti Parungao	Gio Gapas, Justin de Leon & Echo Caceres	Treemount Pictures	LGBT
May 12	Here Comes The Bride	Chris Martinez	Angelica Panganiban, Eugene Domingo, John Lapus, Tuesday Vargas, Tom Rodriguez & Jaime Fabregas	Star Cinema, OctoArts Films and Quantum Films	Comedy
May 26	Noy	Dondon Santos	Coco Martin, Erich Gonzales, Cherry Pie Picache, Baron Geisler, Joem Bascon & Vice Ganda	CineMedia & Star Cinema	Historical
June 2	Fling	Hans Salazar	Rafael Rosell, Jacq Yu & Lara Morena		romantic comedy
June 9	Emir	Chito Roño	Francesca Farr, Dulce, Julia Clarete & Jhong Hilario	CCP, Film Council of the Philippines & Viva Films	Drama, Musical
June 16	I'll Be There	Maryo J delos Reyes	KC Concepcion, Gabby Concepcion & Jericho Rosales	Star Cinema	Drama
June 23	Lagpas: Ikaw, Ano'ng Trip Mo?	Hedji Calagui	Dennis Torres, Rob da Silva, Dustin Jose	Cody Entertainment Production	LGBT
July 14	Cinco	Frasco Mortiz, Enrico Santos, Cathy Garcia-Molina, Ato Bautista & Nick Olanka	Maja Salvador, Pokwang, Jodi Sta. Maria-Lacson, Mariel Rodriguez, Zanjoe Marudo, Rayver Cruz, AJ Perez, Sam Concepcion, Robi Domingo	Star Cinema	Horror
July 21	Hating Kapatid	Wenn V. Deramas	Sarah Geronimo, Judy Ann Santos & Luis Manzano	Viva Films	Comedy
August 18	In Your Eyes	Mac Alejandre	Claudine Barreto, Anne Curtis & Richard Gutierrez	Viva Films & GMA Films	Drama
August 25	Mamarazzi	Joel Lamangan	Eugene Domingo, Diether Ocampo, John Lapus, Andi Eigenmann & Carla Abellana	Regal Films	Comedy
September 1	Sa 'yo Lamang	Laurice Guillen	Lorna Tolentino, Bea Alonzo, Christopher de Leon, Diether Ocampo, Coco Martin, Shaina Magdayao, Enchong Dee, Empress & Miles Ocampo	Star Cinema	Drama
September 8	Two Funerals	Gil Portes	Tessie Tomas, Xian Lim, Jeffrey Quizon, Mon Confiado, Robert Arevalo & Princess Manzon	Cinema One Originals	Drama
September 29	I Do	Veronica B Velasco	Erich Gonzales, Enchong Dee, Pokwang, Dennis Padilla, Melai Cantiveros, Jason Francisco & Nash Aguas	Star Cinema	Romantic comedy
October 13	White House	Topel Lee	Gabby Concepcion, Iza Calzado, Maricar Reyes, Lovi Poe, Megan Young, Joem Bascon, Sarah Lahbati, Janus del Prado & Richard Quan	Regal Films	Horror
October 13	Petrang Kabayo	Wenn V Deramas	Vice Ganda	Viva Films	Comedy
October 22	Lilay: Darling of the Crowd	Andrew Kho	Kenjie Garcia	Sparks International Production	LGBT
October 27	Till My Heartaches End	Jose Javier Reyes	Kim Chiu & Gerald Anderson	Star Cinema	Romantic drama
October 27	Laruang Lalake	Jay Altarejos	Richard Quan, Marco Morales, Arjay Carreon and Mark Fabillar	Lexuality Productions	LGBT
November 24	My Amnesia Girl	Cathy Garcia-Molina	John Lloyd Cruz, Toni Gonzaga	Star Cinema	Romantic comedy
December 10	Pinoy Scout	Neal Tan	Sam Concepcion	Exogain Productions	Drama
December 25	Si Agimat at Si Enteng Kabisote	Tony Y. Reyes	Bong Revilla Jr, Vic Sotto	GMA Films, MZet Productions, OctoArts Films, Imus Productions, APT Entertainment	Comedy fantasy
December 25	Ang Tanging Ina Mo (Last na 'To!)	Wenn V. Deramas	Ai-Ai de las Alas, Eugene Domingo	Star Cinema	Comedy
December 25	Dalaw	Jerry Lopez Sineneng, Dondon Santos	Kris Aquino, Diether Ocampo	Star Cinema, CineMedia Entertainment	horror-suspense
December 25	Shake, Rattle & Roll XII	Zoren Legaspi, Topel Lee, Jerrold Tarog	Shaina Magdayao, Ricky Davao, Andi Eigenmann, Rayver Cruz, Carla Abellana, Sid Lucero	Regal Entertainment Inc.	horror-suspense
December 25	RPG: Metanoia	Louie Suarez	Zaijan Jaranilla, Aga Muhlach, Vhong Navarro, Eugene Domingo, Mika Dela Cruz, Jairus Aquino, Basty Alcances	Star Cinema	Animation
December 25	Super Inday and the Golden Bibe	Mike Tuviera	Marian Rivera, Jake Cuenca, Pokwang, John Lapus	Regal Entertainment	Fantasy
December 25	Rosario	Albert Martinez	Jennylyn Mercado, Dennis Trillo, Dolphy, Sid Lucero, Isabel Oli, Yul Servo	Cinemabuhay International, Studio5	Drama
December 25	Father Jejemon	Frank Gray Jr	Dolphy	RVQ Productions	Comedy

== Music ==
This includes music albums of all kinds released this year, concerts and formations (band or new singers).

=== Albums ===
- January 28 – Unforgettable – Gabby Concepcion (Warner Music Philippines)
- February 13 – Now Playing – Juris (Star Records)
- March 17 – Try Love – Joanna Ampil (Sony Music Philippines)
- March 23 – Eto Pa! – Brownman Revival (Sony Music Philippines)
- June 5 – In Love & War – Francis Magalona & Ely Buendia (Sony Music Philippines)
- September 6 – Middle-Aged Juvenile Novelty Pop-Rockers – Parokya Ni Edgar (Universal Records Philippines)

=== Concerts ===
- January 10 – Sharon Cuneta: The Mega Birthday Concert, live at the Araneta Coliseum
- February 5–7 – 4minute Live at SM Supermalls
- February 6 – Musicfest 2010: Kris Allen, JabbaWockeeZ and Boyce Avenue Live at Fort Bonifacio, Taguig
- February 26–27 – Toni Gonzaga: Love Is..., live at the Music Museum
- February 27 – Backstreet Boys – This Is Us World Tour Live at the Araneta Coliseum
- March 5–6 – Nina, live at the Music Museum
- March 6 – FT Island Manila 2010 Showcase – F.T. Island (PICC Plenary Hall)
- March 9 – Paramore Live in Manila!- SM Mall of Asia Concert Grounds
- March 12–13 – Christian Bautista: Romance Revisited – Christian Bautista (Music Museum)
- March 14 – Owl City, live at TriNoma Mindanao Open Parking Area
- March 25–27 – Cobra Starship: Live at Ayala Malls
- March 27 – Changing Lives: Justin Timberlake, Timbaland and Jojo live at SM Mall of Asia Open Grounds
- March 28 – Tom Jones, live at Araneta Coliseum
- April 10 – Super Junior: Live at the Araneta Coliseum
- April 17 – Pulp Summer Slam 2010 feat. Lamb of God and Testament: Live at Amoranto Stadium
- May 1 – Kelly Clarkson, live at Araneta Coliseum
- May 2 – Tears For Fears, live at Araneta Coliseum
- May 4 – Allison Iraheta, live at Robinson's Place Manila
- May 15 – Then & Now; feat. All-4-One, JoJo, Diana King, SWV, VFactory, TQ, P.M. Dawn etc. live at SM Mall of Asia Open Grounds
- May 17 – Protest Broadcast: live at the Araneta Coliseum
- May 27 – Dashboard Confessional, live at TriNoma Mindanao Open Parking Area
- June 14 – U-KISS: live at the Araneta Coliseum
- June 19 – K-Pop meets P-Pop, feat. U-KISS, Pop Girls and XLR8, live at the Araneta Coliseum
- June 22 – Engelbert Humperdinck, live at the Araneta Coliseum
- June 25 – Air Supply, live at SMX Convention Center
- July 9 – Usher, live at SM Mall of Asia open grounds
- July 15–17 – Charice, live at the Eastwood City malls
- July 16 – As 1 The Repeat, live at the Araneta Coliseum
- July 23–25 – Jason Derulo, live at the Ayala Malls
- July 27 – The Lettermen and The Cascades, live in Manila
- July 30–August 1 – One Way live at SM Supermalls
- July 31 – La Diva Unleashed, live at the Music Museum
- August 13 – Boyz II Men, live at the Araneta Coliseum
- August 21 – La Diva Unleashed: The Repeat; feat. Harry Santos, Gian Magdangal and Jan Nieto, live at the Music Museum
- September 3 – Jay Sean, live at the Araneta Coliseum
- September 10 – ASAP Sessionistas live in General Santos
- September 11:
  - Rock with Arnel Pineda, live at Metro Concert Bar
  - Citipointe Live, at the Philsports Arena
  - Intensity feat. Rain and U-KISS, live at the SM Mall of Asia open grounds
- September 11, 18 & 25 – Billy Crawford in 25 B.C., live at the Music Museum
- September 16, 17, 22, 23, 29 & 30 – Gary V in Soul in Motion, live at the Music Museum
- September 18:
  - Supahfest; feat. T-Pain, Flo Rida, Kelly Rowland and Sean Kingston, live at the SM Mall of Asia open grounds
  - The Spinners, live at the Araneta Coliseum
- September 24–25 – Erik Santos: The Power of One, live at the Meralco Theater
- October 1 – John Mayer, live at SM Mall of Asia open grounds
- October 3 – Jay Park, live at SMX Convention Center Hall 1
- October 7 – Just Jade: Jade Ecleo feat. Jay-R and Dingdong Avanzado, live at Metro Concert Bar
- October 8 – Ogie Alcasid and Ryan Cayabyab: Ogie & Mr. C, live at the PICC Plenary Hall
- October 10 – Adam Lambert, live at SM Mall of Asia open grounds
- October 15 – Tanduay Rhum Rock Fest, live at SM Mall of Asia open grounds
- October 15–17 – Pokwang: Endangered Species, live at Aliw Theater
- October 16:
  - Jack Jones: Greatest Hits Tour live at the Araneta Coliseum
  - Jolly Kids Meal presents Kids Who Can Concert, at the Ninoy Aquino Stadium
- October 17 – The Cascades: live at the PAGCOR Theater
- October 22 – Taylor Swift live in Manila (cancelled)
- October 23 – David Foster and Friends feat. Natalie Cole, Ruben Studdard, Peter Cetera, Charice and The Canadian Tenors: live at the Araneta Coliseum
- October 30 – Pointen live at SM Bacoor
- November 6 – Hatebreed: live at World Trade Center, Pasay
- November 12 – Richard Poon – The Crooner: live at the PICC Plenary Hall
- November 13 – Faithfully...Jovit Baldivino: live at the Aliw Theater
- November 16 – David Archuleta live at SM North EDSA
- November 18 – Gin Blossoms: live at the Araneta Coliseum
- November 18 – December 4: Magsimula Ka: live at the Music Museum
- November 19 – Ai-Ai delas Alas – Akin Ang Tronong 'To!: live at the Araneta Coliseum
- November 26 – Imelda Papin & Dionisia Pacquiao: live at Araneta Coliseum
- November 27:
  - Dionne Warwick: live at the Araneta Coliseum
  - Ely Buendia: XL – Xtra Live at 40: live at Republiq in New Resorts World
- November 28 – Jed Madela: A Classic Christmas, live at the Newport Performing Arts Theater, Resorts World
- November 29 – Jay-R & Kyla: Soulmates, live at the Music Museum
- December 3 – Ugat the Legends of Pinoy Rock: live at Araneta Coliseum
- December 7 – G-Force: About Phase: live at San Juan Gym
- December 9 – IDO4: live at the Araneta Coliseum
- December 10 – Bone Thugs n Harmony: live at SMX Convention Center
- December 16–19 – The Little Big Club: live at the Aliw Theater

=== Formations ===
- Zion
- 100 Percent
- XLR8

== Sports ==
- February 13, Boxing – Nonito Donaire won against Manuel Vargas via knockout in the third round to retain the interim WBA super flyweight title
- March 13, Boxing – Manny Pacquiao defeats Joshua Clottey, controlling the fight from start to finish and winning by unanimous decision. This was the first boxing match held at Cowboys Stadium in Arlington, Texas, drawing more than 41,000 people. This was Pacquiao's first defense of his newly awarded WBO welterweight title.
- September 12, Cheerleading – The UP Pep Squad won the UAAP Cheerdance Competition. FEU Tamaraws placed second, while the UST Salinggawi Dance Troupe placed third.
- September 30 – UAAP Season 73: Ateneo Blue Eagles was the 3-peat Championship Crown Against FEU Tamaraws with the final score 65–62.
- October 15 – NCAA Season 86: San Beda Red Lions wins championship again after defeating San Sebastian Golden Stags in 2009.
- November 12–27, Multi Sport Event – The Philippines is participating at the 2010 Asian Games in Guangzhou, China.
- November 13, Boxing – In a unanimous decision, Manny Pacquiao defeated Antonio Margarito and claimed the vacant WBC Super Welterweight boxing championship.
- December 4, Boxing: – Nonito Donaire won against Wladimir Sidorenko via knockout in the fourth round to win the vacant WBC Continental Americas bantamweight title.
- December 6, Football: – The Philippines national football team defeated Vietnam by the score of 2–0 in the 2010 AFF Suzuki Cup, in what is considered one of the biggest upsets ever recorded in the regional tournament.

== Births ==
- February 11 – Yuan Francisco, child actor
- February 19 – Alonzo Muhlach, child actor
- March 24 – Elia Ilano, child actress
- October 1 – Onyok Pineda, child actor
- October 14 – Leanne Bautista, child actress

== Deaths ==
- January 18 – Celestino Tugot, Filipino professional golfer
- January 19 – Cerge Remonde, former Press Secretary (b. 1958)
- February 21 – Albader Parad, senior leader of Abu Sayyaf, Islamic rebels
- February 26 – Oscar Obligacion, veteran comedian (b. 1924)
- March 15:
  - Emilia Boncodin, former budget secretary, whistle-blower in ZTE-NBN controversy (b. 1954)
  - Joseph Galdon, SJ, former dean of the Ateneo de Manila University
- April 22 – Fred Panopio, folk singer (b. 1941)
- April 27 – Armando Sanchez, former Batangas governor (b. 1953)
- April 29 – Jojo Acuin, popular psychic of the stars (b. 1957)
- May 3 – Florencio Campomanes, Filipino chess player, President Emeritus of FIDE (b. 1927)
- May 17 – Raffy P. Nantes, former governor of Quezon (b. 1957)
- June 13 – Emilio Macias, Filipino politician, Governor of Negros Oriental (b. 1933)
- June 14 – Desidario Camangyan, radio journalist (b. 1952)
- June 16 – Joselito Agustin, Filipino radio journalist (b. 1976)
- July 1 – Francisco F. Claver, Filipino Roman Catholic prelate, Bishop of Malaybalay (1969–1984). (b. 1928)
- July 10 – Adelina Barrion, Filipino entomologist and geneticist (b. 1951)
- July 22:
  - Florencio Vargas, former governor of Cagayan, Representative of the 2nd District of Cagayan (b. 1931)
  - Magnolia Antonino, 94, former Senator and grandmother of congresswoman Darlene Antonino-Custodio (b. 1915)
- July 23 – Prospero Luna, comedian-actor (b. 1931)
- July 25 – Redford White (Cipriano Cermeno II), actor and comedian (b. 1955)
- August 8 – Charlie Davao, Filipino actor, father of actor Ricky Davao (b. 1934)
- August 20 – Lourdes Libres Rosaroso, Cebuano radio broadcaster (b. 1935)
- August 21 – Melody Gersbach, Binibining Pilipinas International 2009 (b. 1986)
- October 3 – Abraham Sarmiento, former Supreme Court Associate Justice 1987–1991 (b. 1921)
- October 7 – Metring David, actress-comedian (b. 1920)
- November 1 – Ernesto Presas, martial arts grandmaster. (b. 1945)
- November 4 – Ophelia Alcantara Dimalanta, poet & academic, hypertension. (b. 1933)
- November 15 – Leonardo Co, botanist & academic (b. 1953)
- November 16 – Wyngard Tracy, talent manager & television personality
- December 26 – Pablo Gomez, writer, radio announcer of DZRH and director (b. 1929)
