= 2013 in the Philippines =

- Decades: 1990s; 2000s; 2010s; 2020s
- See also: List of years in the Philippines; films (highest grossing); television; sports

2013 in the Philippines details events of note that happened in the Philippines in the year 2013.

== Incumbents ==
Benigno S.
Aquino III

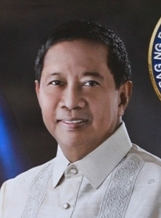
Jejomar C.
Binay Sr.

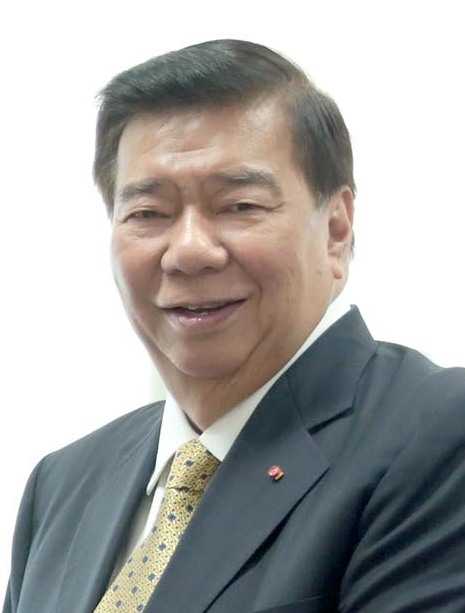
Franklin M. Drilon

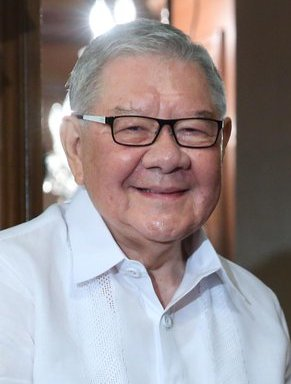
Feliciano R.
Belmonte Jr.

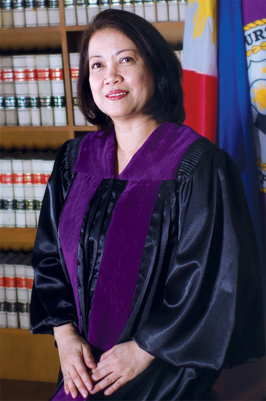
Maria Lourdes
P.A. Sereno

- President: Benigno S. Aquino III (Liberal)
- Vice President: Jejomar C. Binay, Sr. (PDP–Laban)
- Congress (15th, ended June 6):
  - Senate President:
    - Juan Ponce Enrile, Sr. (PMP) – resigned June 5
    - Jinggoy Estrada (PMP) – acting June 5 to 6
  - House Speaker: Feliciano Belmonte, Jr. (Liberal)
- Congress (16th, convened July 22):
  - Senate President: Franklin M. Drilon (Liberal) – elected July 22
  - House Speaker: Feliciano R. Belmonte, Jr. (Liberal) – elected July 22
- Chief Justice: Maria Lourdes P.A. Sereno

== Events ==
=== January ===
- January 17 – USS Guardian (MCM-5), an American mine countermeasures ship, ran ground at Tubbataha Reef, testing relations between the Philippines and the United States.

=== February ===
Location map of the standoff

- February 12 – Gunmen claiming to be part of the royal army of the Sulu Sultanate lands on Lahad Datu, Sabah causing a standoff which tested bilateral relations between the Philippines and Malaysia.

=== March ===
- March 4 – The Gramercy Residences, the tallest residential building in the Philippines at 250 m is opened.
- March 16 – The Solaire Resort & Casino at the Entertainment City in Parañaque opens to the public, becoming the first resort-casino complex to open in the area.
- March 25 – President Aquino III, signs Anti Drugged and Drunk Driving Law of 2013 or RA. 10586.

=== April ===
- April 20 – A Chinese fishing vessel with 20 fishermen on board, runs ground at Tubbataha Reef, almost two months after the USS Guardian ran ground on the same reef. The fishermen will face charges of illegal poaching and attempted bribery.

=== May ===
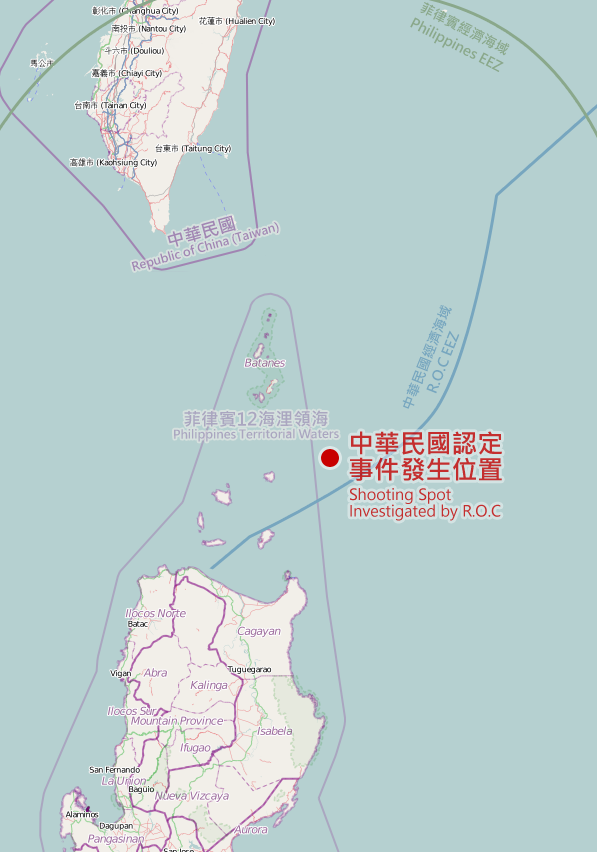
Location of the shooting incident, the territorial waters and EEZ claimed by both countries

- May 2 – Former police officer Cezar Mancao, who is accused of involvement in the murders of publicist Bubby Dacer and his driver Emmanuel Corbito in 2000, escaped from the custody of the National Bureau of Investigation.
- May 5 – A massive power outages strikes Luzon after several transmission lines trip out.
- May 7 – Mayon Volcano produces a surprise phreatic eruption lasting 73 seconds. Ash and rock were produced during this eruption. Ash clouds reached 500 meters above the volcano's summit, which drifted west southwest The event killed five climbers, of whom three were Germans, one was a Spaniard living in Germany and one was a Filipino tour guide while Seven others were reported injured.
- May 9 – A Philippine Coastguard vessel opened fire on a Taiwanese fishing vessel, allegedly inside Philippine maritime territory, leaving one Taiwanese fisherman dead. Tensions between Taiwan and the Philippines heat up as Taiwanese President Ma Ying-jeou, threatens to impose sanctions on the Philippines a day after the incident. The Philippine Coast Guard sympathizes with the victim but refuses to apologize for the incident and insisted that its personnel are just doing their job to address illegal fishing.
- May 13 – 2013 Mid-term Elections.
- May 31 –
  - A fatal explosion occurs at the Two Serendra condominium complex, in the Bonifacio Global City, Taguig.
  - Multiply cease operations.

=== June ===
- June 2 – Cebu Pacific Flight 971, using an Airbus A320-214 and registered as RP-C3266 carrying 165 passengers inbound from Manila, overshoots the runway at Francisco Bangoy International Airport in Davao City during heavy rain. There are no fatalities and injuries, but the plane is heavily damaged and written-off.
- June 5 – Senator Juan Ponce Enrile resigns as Senate President amidst various allegations against the senator.

=== July ===
- July 19 – The League of Cities of the Philippines finally acknowledges the cityhood of Baybay, Leyte; Bogo, Cebu; Catbalogan, Samar; Tandag, Surigao del Sur; Lamitan, Basilan; Borongan, Eastern Samar; Tayabas, Quezon; Tabuk, Kalinga; Bayugan, Agusan del Sur; Batac, Ilocos Norte; Mati, Davao Oriental; Guihulngan, Negros Oriental; Cabadbaran, Agusan del Norte; El Salvador, Misamis Oriental; Carcar, Cebu and Naga, Cebu. Its National Executive Board Resolution adopted on July 5 which formally recognizing the cities after the decision of the Supreme Court on the cityhood case and memoranda from the Commission on Elections (COMELEC) and the Department of Budget and Management (DBM).
- July 26 – At least 8 people are killed and 48 people injured in a bomb blast at the Limketkai Center in Cagayan de Oro, Philippines.

=== August ===
- August 5 – At least 8 people are killed and 40 others injured after a car bomb exploded in Cotabato City. It is the worst such attack ever in the city.
- August 9–10 – Typhoon Labuyo.
  - Typhoon Utor (2013)
- August 12 – MNLF leader Nur Misuari unilaterally declares the independence of the Bangsamoro Republik. The Philippine government and the international community refuses to recognize it.
- August 16 – MV St. Thomas Aquinas collides with MV Sulpicio Express Siete resulting in 55 deaths. 65 people remain missing.
- August 18–20 – Typhoon Maring (international name Trami) Typhoon Maring hit northern Luzon, but affected the whole areas of Luzon through the Southwest Monsoon or Habagat. The southwest monsoon brought by Typhoon Maring hit Metro Manila, Cavite, some parts of Rizal and Laguna, leaving many areas flooded. Eight people were reported dead, with over 200,000 homeless.
- August 26 – Widespread protests against the Priority Development Assistance Fund scam was organized nationwide. Some Filipino communities worldwide also held solidarity protest. The biggest demonstration that was held on this day was the Million People March held in Luneta Park in Manila.

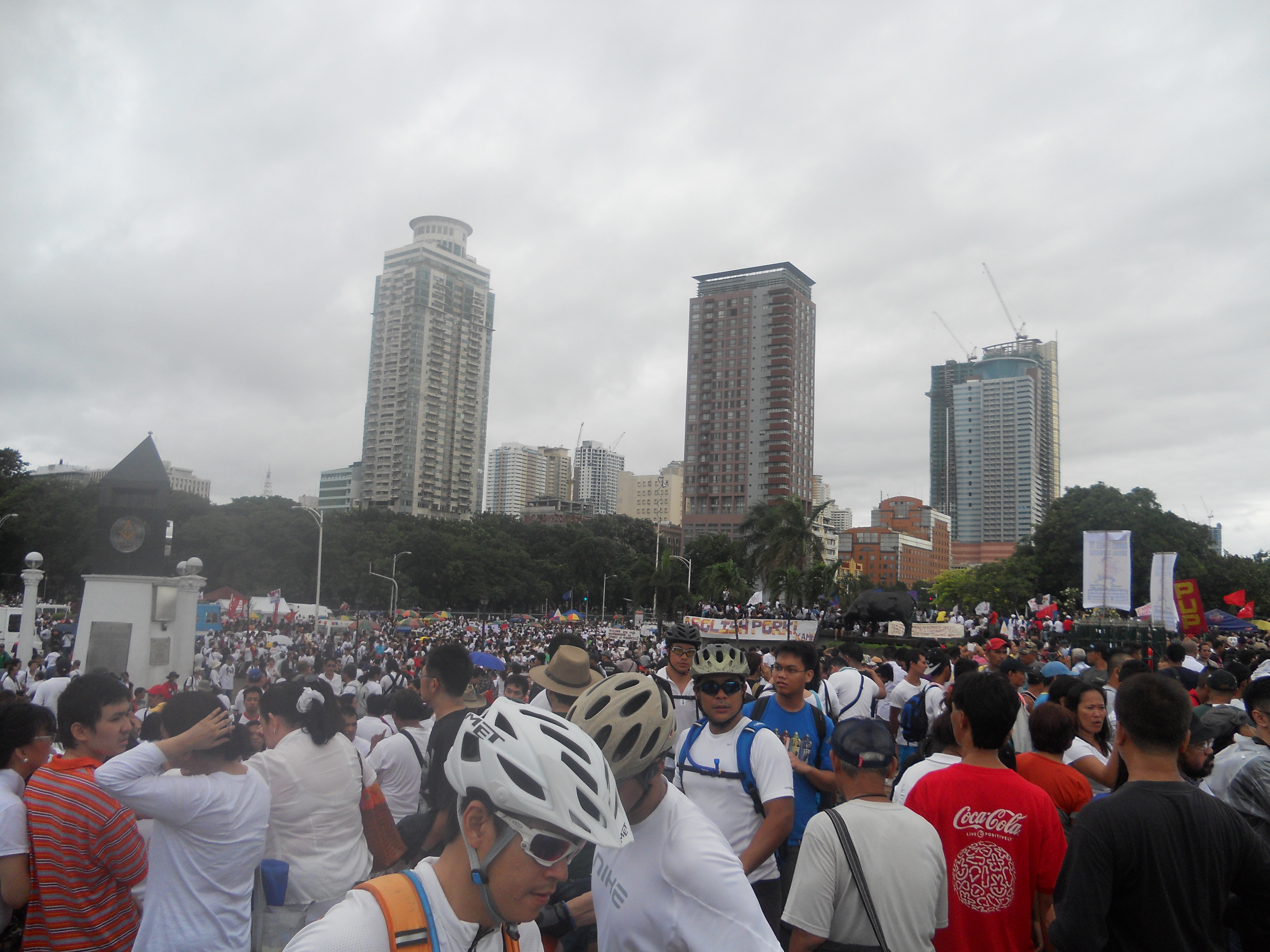
Demonstrators in Luneta Park

- August 28 – Just hours after Malacañang sets a P10-million bounty for any information leading to her arrest, Janet Napoles surrenders to President Aquino III.

=== September ===
- September 9–28 – The Moro National Liberation Front and government forces clash in Zamboanga City, paralyzing economic activity in the city.
- September 26 – The Comelec disqualifies Laguna governor E. R. Ejercito for poll overspending.

=== October ===
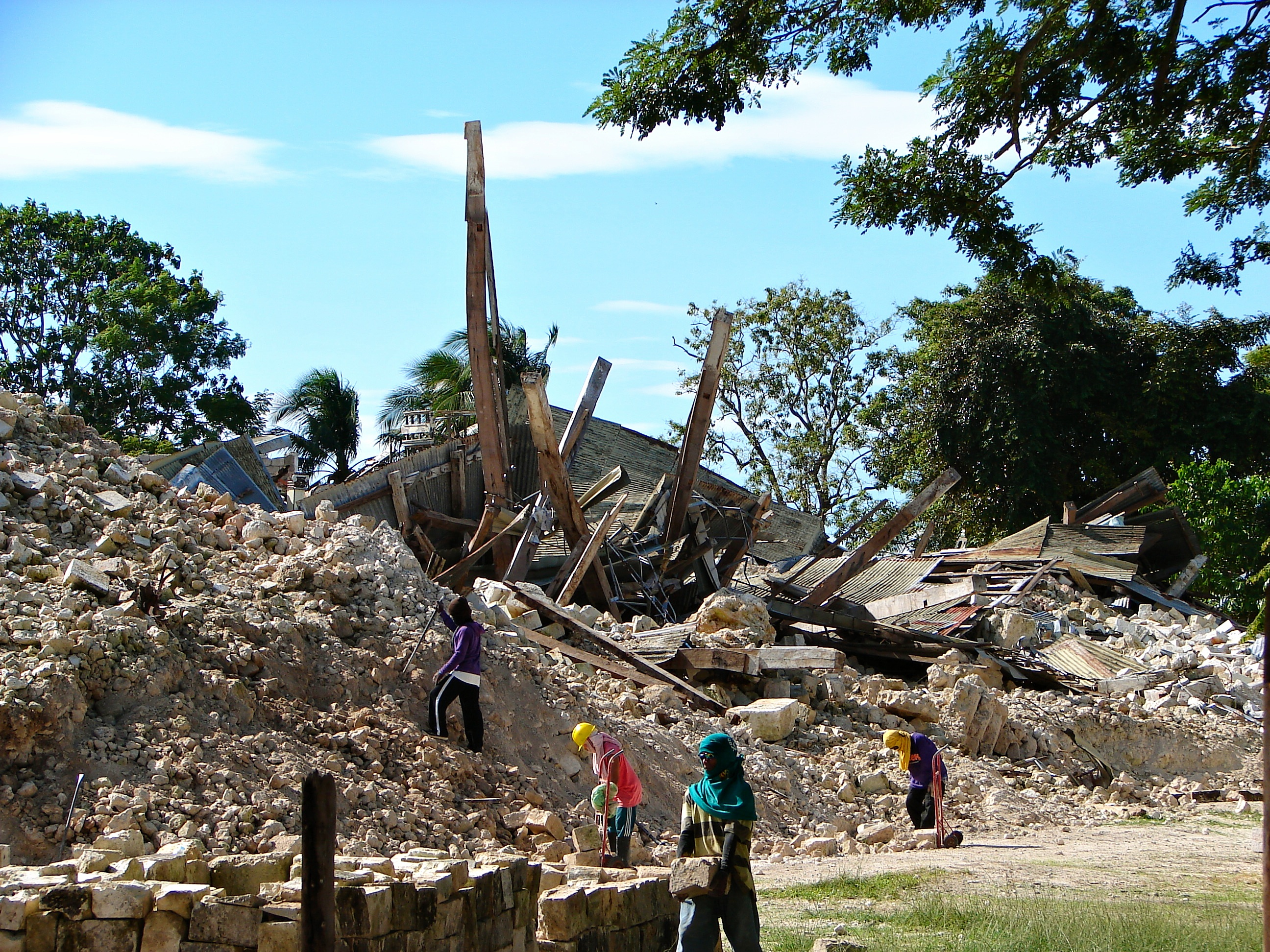
The rubble of the Church of Our Lady of Light in Loon, Bohol, the oldest and one of the largest in the province

- October 11 – Typhoon Santi
  - Typhoon Nari (2013)
- October 15 – A magnitude 7.2 earthquake strikes the island of Bohol with a depth of 20.0 km (12.4 mi). Its epicenter is in the town of Sagbayan. At least 144 deaths are recorded, with 291 people injured.
- October 28
  - The elections for the barangay officials are held.
  - Davao Occidental becomes the 81st province of the Philippines by the virtue of Republic Act No. 10360.

=== November ===
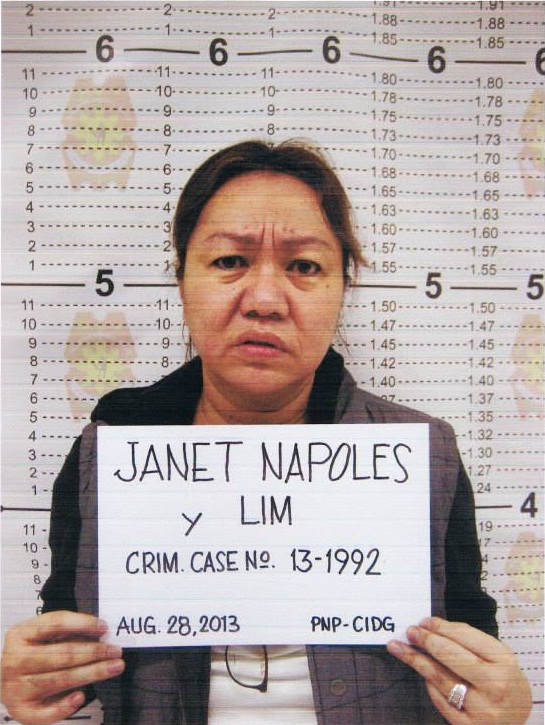
Janet Lim-Napoles's official mugshot

- November 7 – Janet Lim-Napoles, the alleged mastermind in the P10 billion pork barrel scam faces the Senate for the first time to answer the allegations against her.

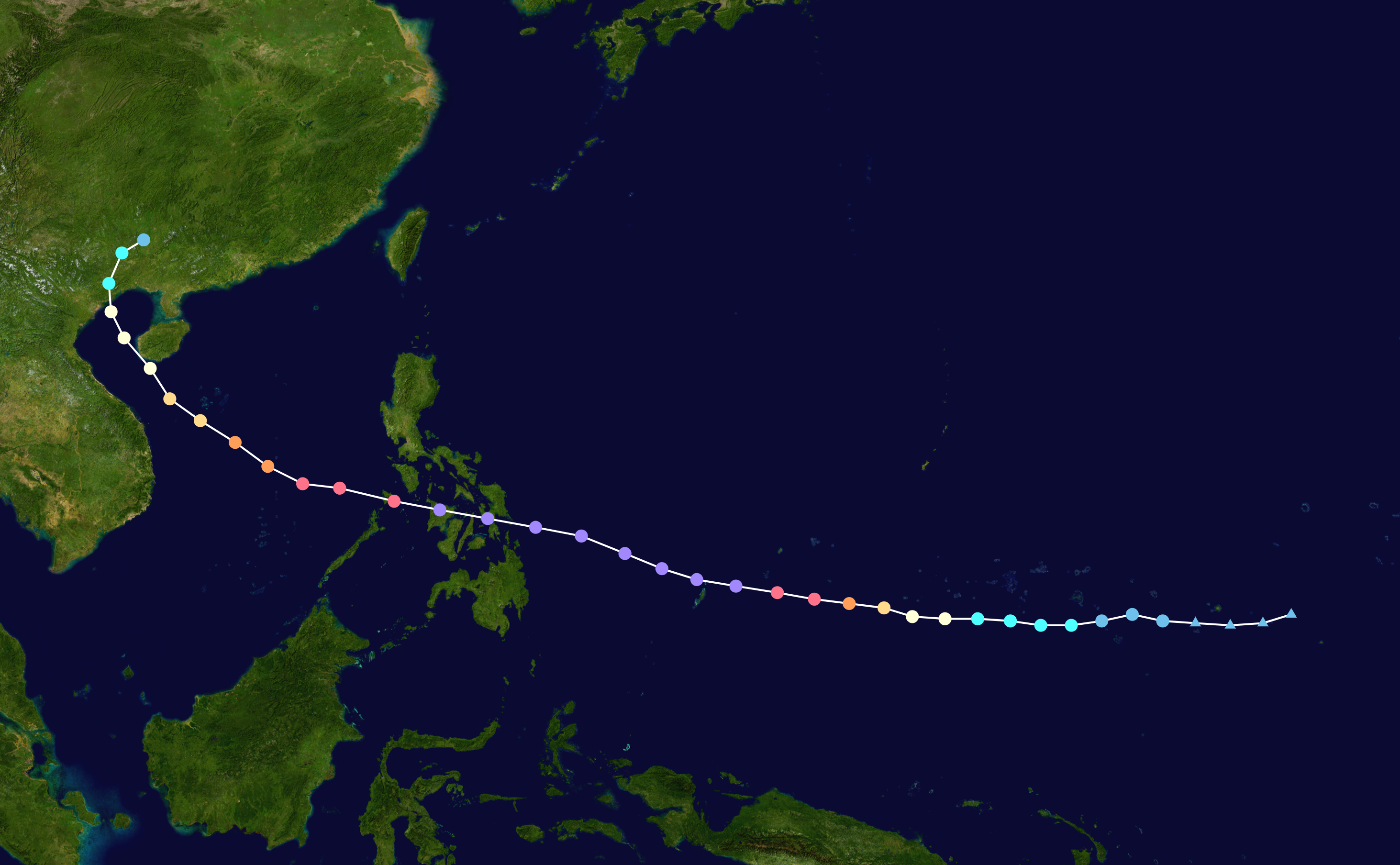
Map showing the path of a storm as represented by colored dots connected by a white line; the position of the dots indicates the storm's position at six-hour intervals, while color denotes the storm's intensity at that point. Map key Saffir–Simpson scale Tropical depression (≤38 mph, ≤62 km/h) Tropical storm (39–73 mph, 63–118 km/h) Category 1 (74–95 mph, 119–153 km/h) Category 2 (96–110 mph, 154–177 km/h) Category 3 (111–129 mph, 178–208 km/h) Category 4 (130–156 mph, 209–251 km/h) Category 5 (≥157 mph, ≥252 km/h) Unknown Storm type Tropical cyclone Subtropical cyclone Extratropical cyclone, remnant low, tropical disturbance, or monsoon depression

- November 8 – Typhoon Haiyan (known in the Philippines as Typhoon Yolanda), the deadliest Philippine typhoon on record, causes catastrophic destruction in the Visayas, particularly on the islands of Samar and Leyte, killing 6,300 people. About 11 million people have been affected by the typhoon with many left homeless.
- November 15 – A group of Abu Sayyaf militant raids a resort on the Malaysian island of Pom Pom in Semporna, Sabah. During the ambush, a couples from Taiwan was on the resort when one of them been shot dead by the militant while the second victim was kidnapped and taken to the Sulu Archipelago. The victim was later freed in Sulu Province with the help of Philippine security forces.
- November 20 – The Supreme Court of the Philippines abolishes the Priority Development Assistance Fund otherwise known as the 'pork barrel'.
- November 25 – The special barangay elections are held in Zamboanga City and Bohol.

=== December ===
- December 2 – Drone technology is introduced for the first time in Philippine television through UNTV capturing the devastation of Typhoon Haiyan.
- December 6 – Former Batangas governor Antonio Leviste is released after four years on parole.
- December 9 – The Philippines and the Bangsamoro sign a power-sharing agreement, paving the way for the peace process.
- December 12 – The Comelec disqualifies governors Vilma Santos of Batangas, E. R. Ejercito of Laguna, Ryan Luis Singson of Ilocos Sur and Amado Espino, Jr. of Pangasinan. The commission also disqualified congressmen Gloria Macapagal Arroyo of Pampanga and Rodolfo Biazon of Muntinlupa and several elected government officials failed to submit their Statement of Contributions and Expenditures.
- December 15 – Former Pagadian mayor Samuel S. Co and his wife, Priscilla are arrested. Both are facing syndicated estafa case in connection with the multi-billion Ponzi scheme of Aman Futures.

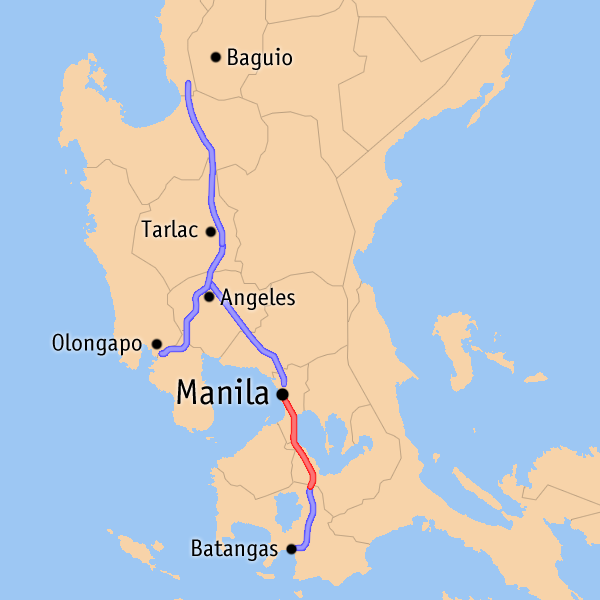
Map of expressways in Luzon, with the South Luzon Expressway in red

- December 16 – A bus operated by Don Mariano falls off the Metro Manila Skyway near Bicutan, Parañaque, killing 18 people and injuring 20 others. The accident which was the worst along the skyway at that time led to calls for the installation of speed-limiting or monitoring devices in public utility vehicles.
- December 20 – A shooting at the arrival area of Ninoy Aquino International Airport in Manila killed four people, including Mayor Ukol Talumpa of Labangan, Zamboanga del Sur and his wife Lea, and left five others injured.
- December 28 – San Pedro becomes a component city in the province of Laguna through ratification of Republic Act 10420.

== Holidays ==
On December 11, 2009, Republic Act No. 9849 declared Eidul Adha as a regular holiday. Also amending Executive Order No. 292, also known as The Administrative Code of 1987, the following are regular and special days shall be observed. The EDSA Revolution Anniversary was proclaimed since 2002 as a special nonworking holiday. On February 25, 2004, Republic Act No. 9256 declared every August 21 as a special nonworking holiday to be known as Ninoy Aquino Day. Note that in the list, holidays in bold are "regular holidays" and those in italics are "nationwide special days".

- January 1 – **New Year's Day**
- February 25 – 1986 EDSA Revolution
- March 28 – **Maundy Thursday**
- March 29 – **Good Friday**
- April 9 – **Araw ng Kagitingan** (Day of Valor)
- May 1 – **Labor Day**
- May 13 – Election Day
- June 12 – **Independence Day**
- August 9 – **Eidul Fitr**
- August 21 – **Ninoy Aquino Day**
- August 25 – **National Heroes Day**
- October 15 – **Eidul Adha**
- November 1 – All Saints Day
- November 30 – **Bonifacio Day**
- December 25 – **Christmas Day**
- December 30 – **Rizal Day**
- December 31 – Last Day of the Year

In addition, several other places observe local holidays, such as the foundation of their town. These are also "special days."

== Theater, culture and arts ==
- April 14 – Ariella Arida, Bea Rose Santiago, Joanna Cindy Miranda, Mutya Johanna Datul and Pia Wurtzbach was crowned as the new Binibining Pilipinas winners. Arida was crowned by Miss Universe 2012 1st runner-up Janine Tugonon as the new Miss Universe–Philippines 2013. Santiago was crowned as the new Binibining Pilipinas–International 2013 by the outgoing titleholder Nicole Schmitz. Miranda as the new Binibining Pilipinas–Tourism 2013 crowned by Katrina Jayne Dimaranan. Datul was crowned as the new Binibining Pilipinas–Supranational 2013 by Miss Supranational 2012 3rd runner-up Elaine Kay Moll. Wurtzbach ended as the Binibining Pilipinas 2013 1st runner-up.
- August 18 – Megan Young is crowned Miss World Philippines 2013 at the Solaire Resort & Casino in Parañaque
- September 6 – Mutya Johanna Datul is crowned Miss Supranational 2013 and is the first Asian and first Filipina to win the title.
- September 28 – Miss Philippines Megan Young was crowned Miss World 2013 and is the first Filipina to win the title.
- October 5–6 – ABS-CBN marks its 60th anniversary of the Philippine Television with the Grand Kapamilya Weekend held at the Quezon City Memorial Circle, Smart Araneta Coliseum and Marikina Sports Complex.
- November 9 – Miss Philippines Ariella Arida wins third runner-up in the Miss Universe 2013 in Moscow Oblast, Russia.
- November 19 – Miss Philippines Annalie Forbes won third runner-up in the Miss Grand International 2013 in Bangkok, Thailand
- November 21
  - Miss Philippines Amber Delos Reyes won Miss Teen Expoworld Universe 2013 held in Guatemala.
  - Mister Philippines Gil Wagas won fourth runner-up in the Mister International 2013 held in Skenoo Hall, Gandaria City Mall, Jakarta, Indonesia
- December 7 – Alyz Henrich from Venezuela crowned as Miss Earth 2013.
- December 14 – Miss Philippines Koreen Medina won third runner-up in the Miss Intercontinental 2013 held in Magdeburg, Germany.
- December 17 – Miss Philippines Bea Rose Santiago won Miss International 2013 held in Tokyo, Japan
- December 31 – Miss Philippines Angeli Dione Gomez won Miss Tourism International 2013 in Putrajaya, Malaysia.

== Music ==
=== Concerts ===
- January 5 – Regine Velasquez Silver Rewind live at the Mall of Asia Arena
- January 16 – Swedish House Mafia: The One Last Tour live at the Mall of Asia Arena
- January 16–20 – Jabbawockeez live at the Ayala Malls
- January 19 – Dream K-Pop Fantasy Concert Featuring Girls' Generation, Infinite, U-Kiss, Exo M/K, Tasty, and Tahiti live at the SM Mall of Asia Concert Grounds
- February 2 – TM Astig Panalo Fest Mall of Asia Arena
- February 14:
  - Foursome live at the Mall of Asia Arena
  - Jessica Sanchez live at the Smart Araneta Coliseum
- February 15 – Paramore live at the Mall of Asia Arena
- February 16 – Psy live at the Mall of Asia Arena
- February 22 – Jose Feliciano live at the Smart Araneta Coliseum
- February 28 – Cliff Richard live at the Smart Araneta Coliseum
- March 2 – 2PM live at the Mall of Asia Arena
- March 15 – Jose & Wally Concert: A Party for Juan and All live at the Smart Araneta Coliseum
- March 16 – Foursome: The Repeat live at the Mall of Asia Arena
- March 20 – Demi Lovato live at the Smart Araneta Coliseum
- March 22 – Bloc Party live at the World Trade Center, Hall D
- March 31 – The Script live at the Smart Araneta Coliseum
- April 5 – Gloria Gaynor: I Will Survive live at the NBC Tent, Fort Bonifacio, Taguig
- April 6 – Julio Iglesias live at the Manila Hotel Tent City
- April 9 – Lawson live at the Eastwood Mall Open Park
- April 27 – Close-Up Summer Solstice 2013 Featuring Afrojack, Alex Gaudino, Cedric Gervais, Dev, Jump Smokers, Sandwich, Spongecola, Urbandub, and Cobra Starship live at the SM Mall of Asia Concert Grounds
- April 30 – Daniel Padilla: A Birthday Concert live at the Smart Araneta Coliseum
- May 3 – Modern English and The Alarm: Back to the 80's – New Wave Concert Party live at the Mall of Asia Arena
- May 4 – Slash live at the Smart Araneta Coliseum
- May 8 – Aerosmith: The Global Warming World Tour! live at the Mall of Asia Arena
- May 11 – Julie Anne San Jose: It's My Time Concert live at the Music Museum
- May 14 – Jason Mraz live at the Smart Araneta Coliseum
- May 15 – Avicii live at the Mall of Asia Arena
- May 17 – Vice Ganda Concert: I-Vice Ganda Mo Ako sa Araneta! live at the Smart Araneta Coliseum
- May 20 – Nick Vujicic: Unstoppable Concert live at the Smart Araneta Coliseum
- May 26 – Alden Richards live at Trinoma
- June 7 – Switch Featuring Callalily and 6cyclemind live at the Music Museum
- June 12 – Freedom Rocks Independence Day Concert live at the Araneta Center
- June 14:
  - Rico Blanco live at the Music Museum
  - Sungha Jung live at the J Centre Convention Hall, Mandaue City, Cebu
- June 15:
  - Sungha Jung live at the Newport Performing Arts Theater, Resorts World Manila
  - CNBlue: The Blue Moon World Tour live at the Smart Araneta Coliseum
- June 24 – A Royal Evening With Princess Velasco live at the Off The Grill
- June 27 – Antipolo Music Festival live at the Ynares Center
- June 29:
  - Big Fish Innovation White live at the World Trade Center
  - The Pianist's Pianist live at the CCP Theater
- July 6 – Lee Min-ho live at the Mall of Asia Arena
- July 19 – Spongecola: Maximum Capacity live at the Music Museum
- July 20 – Dionne Warwick and Tavares live at The Manila Hotel Tent.
- July 21 – Dionne Warwick and Tavares live at the SMX Convention Center Davao
- July 23 – Dionne Warwick and Tavares live at the Smart Araneta Coliseum
- July 26:
  - Juris Fernandez live at the Ynares Sports Arena
  - The XX live at the NBC Tent
- July 31 – Killswitch Engage live at SM Skydome
- August 6 – Pet Shop Boys live at the Smart Araneta Coliseum
- August 7 – Carly Rae Jepsen live at the Smart Araneta Coliseum
- August 8 – Fall Out Boy Save Rock and Roll live at the Smart Araneta Coliseum
- August 9 – Mark Bautista The Sound of Love live at Music Museum
- August 13:
  - Linkin Park: Living Things World Tour live at the Mall of Asia Arena
  - Air Supply: The Greatest Hits live at the Solaire Resort
- August 16 – Ogie Alcasid: 25 I Write The Songs: The 25th Anniversary Celebration live at the Mall of Asia Arena
- August 17:
  - Abra The Grand Concert live at the Globe Circuit Event Grounds, Makati
  - Bamboo and Yeng Constantino: By Request live at the Smart Araneta Coliseum
- August 19 – Japandroids live at the Hard Rock Cafe, Glorietta III, Makati
- August 20 – Side A iHelp Concert for a Cause live at the Music Museum
- August 25 – Bazooka Rocks Festival live at the SMX Convention Center
- August 30 – Renee Olstead live at the Fairmont Hotel
- August 31 – Big Fish Innovation Black live at the World Trade Center
- September 4 – Pitbull: Global Warming Tour live at the Mall of Asia Arena
- September 5 – George Benson with Patti Austin live at the Smart Araneta Coliseum
- September 7:
  - K-Pop Republic Featuring Dal Shabet, Exo K and SHINee live at the Smart Araneta Coliseum
  - The Piano Guys live at the SM Mall of Asia Center Stage
  - Patti Austin with Joe Pizzulo live at the Crowne Plaza Ballroom
- September 9 – Patti Austin with Joe Pizzulo live at the SMX Convention Center Davao
- September 10 – Frankie Valli and the Four Seasons live at the Smart Araneta Coliseum
- September 13 – Martin Nievera 3D Concert live at the Smart Araneta Coliseum
- September 14 – Sandwich 15th Anniversary Concert live at the 19 East Bar
- September 17 – Tony Bennett live at the PICC Plenary Hall
- September 19 – Rihanna: Diamonds World Tour live at the Mall of Asia Arena
- September 26:
  - The Killers live at the Smart Araneta Coliseum
  - Zia Quizon: A Little Bit of Lovin live at the Music Museum
- September 27 – 202: Debut Performance live at D.L. Umali, UPLB
- September 27–29 – Relient K live at the Ayala Malls
- September 28:
  - The Magical Music of Disney live at the CCP Main Theater
  - Charice and Aiza: The Power of Two live at the Smart Araneta Coliseum
  - P.O.D. Live at Dutdutan 13 live at the World Trade Center
  - Bikes, Boards and Bands live at the Republic Wake Park
- October 2 – Biodiversity Rocks Concert live at the Hard Rock Cafe
- October 3 – Club Life: Tiesto live at the Smart Araneta Coliseum
- October 4:
  - Planetshakers: Night of Fire live at the Qimonda I.T. Center Cebu City
  - Smart Bro Live and Loud Interactive Concert live at the Trinoma Mindanao Open Parking
- October 10 – Fatboy Slim live at the Republiq
- October 12 – One More Try: My Husband's Lover The Concert live at the Smart Araneta Coliseum
- October 18 – Michael Johnson, Stephen Bishop, Joe Puerta Concert live at the Smart Araneta Coliseum
- October 21 – Sugar Ray, Smash Mouth and Gin Blossoms live at the Smart Araneta Coliseum
- October 24:
  - Kesha: Warrior Tour live at the Smart Araneta Coliseum
  - Super Junior: Super Show 5 live at the Mall of Asia Arena
- October 25 – Tanduay Rhum Rockfest Year 7 live at the SM Mall of Asia Concert Grounds
- October 26:
  - Black Party Manila X live at the Smart Araneta Coliseum
  - Big Fish Cream Halloween Ball live at the World Trade Center
- October 28 – Rob Schneider live at the Solaire Resort
- October 29 – Libera live at the PICC Plenary Hall
- October 30 – Explosions in the Sky live at the Samsung Hall SM Aura
- November 3 – Infinite: One Great Step live at the Smart Araneta Coliseum
- November 6 – OneRepublic: The Native Tour live at the Smart Araneta Coliseum
- November 7 – Aljur Abrenica Come and Get Me Concert live at the Music Museum
- November 8 – Matchbox Twenty live at the Mall of Asia Arena
- November 9:
  - Close-Up Forever Summer live at the Bonifacio Global City
  - Erik Santos inTENse Concert live at the PICC Plenary Hall
  - Mocha Girls Red Hot Mocha Night live at the Music Museum
- November 11 – The Lettermen live at the Newport Performing Arts Theater, Resorts World Manila
- November 12 – Myx Mo 2013 live at the SM Mall of Asia Concert Grounds
- November 13 – Love Overload Over Asia with John Ford Coley live at the Solaire Resort
- November 15:
  - Sarah Geronimo Perfect 10 Concert live at the Smart Araneta Coliseum
  - Jed Madela 10th Anniversary Concert live at the PICC Plenary Hall
  - Greenlight Music Festival live at the Greenfield District
- November 16:
  - Richard Clayderman live at the PICC Plenary Hall
  - David Elkins live at the Hard Rock Cafe Makati
  - Tulong Na, Tabang Na, Tayo Na A Benefit Concert live at the Smart Araneta Coliseum
- November 20 – Lani Misalucha Queen of the Night live at the Solaire Resort
- November 21 – United Republiq featuring Axwell live at the SM Mall of Asia Concert Grounds
- November 22 – Martin Nievera 3D The Repeat live at the Smart Araneta Coliseum
- November 25:
  - Alicia Keys: Set the World on Fire Tour live at the Mall of Asia Arena
  - Tegan and Sara live at the NBC Tent
- November 26 – Two Door Cinema Club live at the NBC Tent
- November 28 – Sitti Bossa Love Concert live at the Music Museum
- November 29 – Enrique Gil King of the Gil live at the Smart Araneta Coliseum
- November 30:
  - Cinema Jam Outdoor Movie and Music Fest live at the Circuit Makati
  - Sarah Geronimo Perfect 10 Concert The Repeat live at the Mall of Asia Arena
- December 6 & 7: Lea Salonga Playlist Concert live at the PICC Plenary Hall
- December 7 – Sonic Carnival Feast live at the SM Mall of Asia Concert Grounds
- December 11 – Air Supply live at the Solaire Resort
- December 12 – Zedd live at the SMX Convention Center
- December 14:
  - Otto Knows live at the Republiq Club
  - Exception Music Festival live at the Circuit Makati
- December 30 – Boyce Avenue live at the Resorts World Manila

== Sports ==
- January 16 – Basketball: The Talk 'N Text Tropang Texters win the sixth PBA championship after defeating the Rain or Shine Elasto Painters at the 2012–13 PBA Philippine Cup Finals win this series 4–0
- March 6 – Volleyball: La Salle defeated Ateneo in three sets, 25–23, 25–20, 25–16, to finish the series in two games and win their eighth UAAP women's volleyball championship title. Michele Gumabao was named the Most Valuable Player (MVP) of the Finals.
- March 9 – Cheerleading: The Altas Perpsquad won the NCAA Cheerleading Competition. AU Dancing Chiefs placed second, while the EAC Pep Squad placed third.
- April 13 – Boxing: Nonito Donaire lost to Guillermo Rigondeaux by unanimous decision, ending his 12-year winning streak since his first loss to Rosendo Sanchez.
- May 19 – Basketball: The Alaska Aces wins defeating the Barangay Ginebra San Miguel with a score of 104–80, winning the 2013 PBA Commissioner's Cup Finals.
- June 29 – July 6 – Multi Sport Event: The Philippines participated in the 2013 Asian Indoor and Martial Arts Games held in Incheon, South Korea from June 29 to July 6.
- July 22 – Basketball: NBA 2013 MVP and Finals MVP LeBron James of the Miami Heat visited the Philippines at Bonifacio Global City, Taguig.
- August 1–11 – Basketball: The 2013 FIBA Asia Championship was hosted by the Philippines from August 1–11, 2013 and held at the Mall of Asia Arena at Pasay, Manila. The Philippines men's national basketball team won the silver medal.
- August 16–24 – Multi Sport Event: The Philippines competed at the 2013 Asian Youth Games held in Nanjing, People's Republic of China from August 16, 2013, to August 24, 2013. The Philippines have their first ever gold medal for the Asian Youth Games after Mia Legaspi and Princess Superal grabbed the Gold and Silver respectively in Women's Golf.
- September 15 – Cheerleading: The NU Pep Squad won the UAAP Cheerdance Competition. UP Pep Squad placed second, while the DLSU Animo Squad placed third.
- October 10 – Basketball: The first ever NBA pre-season game was held at the Mall of Asia Arena in the game between the Houston Rockets and the Indiana Pacers . The pre-season game was also the first one to be held in Southeast Asia.
- October 11–15 – Football: The Philippines hosted the 2013 Philippine Peace Cup in Bacolod. The Philippines won the tournament.
- October 12 – Basketball: Basketball team De La Salle Green Archers defeated the UST Growling Tigers 2–1 in their final series to win their eighth men's title in the UAAP Championships.
- October 25 – Basketball San Mig Coffee defeated Petron in 2013 PBA Governors' Cup Finals at Big Dome in Quezon City won score 87–77
- November 10 – Boxing: Nonito Donaire won via TKO in the 9th round against Vic Darchinyan.
- November 16 – Basketball: Basketball team San Beda Red Lions defeated the Letran Knights 2–1 in their final series to win their nineteenth men's title in the NCAA Championships.
- November 23 – Boxing: Manny Pacquiao won via unanimous decision against Brandon Rios to retain the WBO International Welterweight title.
- December 11–22 – 2013 Southeast Asian Games: The Philippine Team placed seventh place
- December 17 – Basketball: La Salle defeated SWU 2–0 in the best-of-3 finals to win their 2nd PCCL championship.

== Deaths ==
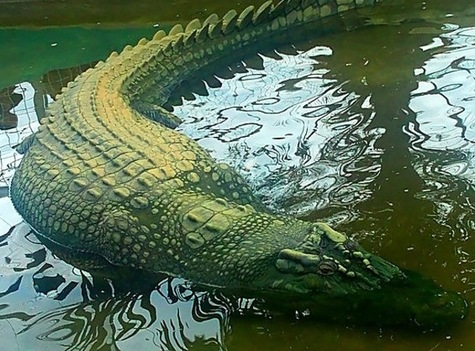
Lolong

- January 7 – Gonzalo G. Puyat II, 79, former president of FIBA
- January 9 – Anscar Chupungco, 73, liturgist and theologian, heart attack
- January 24 – Pepe Pimentel, 83, TV host, stroke
- February 10 – Lolong, largest recorded crocodile
- February 16:
  - Benjamin Dy, 60, Governor of Isabela, emphysema
  - Fernando Álvarez, 87, former footballer, sports executive and referee
- March 10:
  - Edelmiro Amante, 79, Congressman of Second District of Agusan del Norte and Executive Secretary, liver cancer
  - Danny Zialcita, 73, Filipino movie director, writer and producer, stroke
- March 14 – Subas Herrero, 69, actor, double pneumonia
- March 21 – Isagani Cruz, 88, judge and Associate Justice of the Supreme Court of the Philippines, sleep
- March 23 – Onofre Corpuz, 86, President of the University of the Philippines, illness
- April 23 – Jose Solis, 73, Filipino politician, member of the House of Representatives for Sorsogon 2nd District
- April 24 – Pedro Romualdo, 77, Filipino politician, member of House of Representatives for Camiguin (1987–1998, since 2007), Governor of Camiguin (1998–2007), pneumonia
- April 30 – Roberto Chabet, 76, Filipino artist, heart attack
- May 12:
  - Tita Swarding, 60, radio personality, emphysema
  - Daisy Avellana, 96, stage actress and director, National Artist of the Philippines for Theater and Film, illness
- May 15 – Raul Gonzalez, 78, Filipino journalist, Press Secretary for Diosdado Macapagal (1961–1965), cancer
- May 19 – Bella Flores, 84, actress, complications from a recent hip surgery
- May 28 – Eddie Romero, 88, director, National Artist of the Philippines for Theater and Film, prostate cancer
- June 12 – Hugo Gutierrez, Jr., 86, Filipino jurist, Associate Justice of the Supreme Court of the Philippines, diabetes
- July 5 – Ama Quiambao, 65, actress, heart attack
- July 6 – Ruben J. Villote, 80, Filipino Roman Catholic priest and activist, illness
- July 8 – Tunggan Mangudadatu Piang, Filipino politician, heart attack
- July 9 – Andrea Veneracion, 84, Filipina choral conductor, National Artist for Music, stroke
- July 22 – Ramon T. Jimenez, 89, attorney in the Philippines, illness
- August 21 – Rodolfo Tan Cardoso, 75, Filipino chess player, heart attack
- September 7 – Susan Fuentes, 58, Queen of Visayan songs, colon cancer
- September 11 – Frank Chavez, 66, former Solicitor General of the Philippines, stroke
- September 13 – Nora Daza, veteran gourmet chef, restaurateur, socio-civic leader and television host, 84, pneumonia
- September 15 – Julius Camba, reporter, 28, car accident
- October 7 – Leandro Mendoza, Philippine Executive Secretary, 67, heart attack
- October 9 – Maximiano Tuazon Cruz, 90, Filipino Roman Catholic prelate, Bishop of Calbayog, illness
- October 15 – Cancio Garcia, 75, Filipino jurist, Associate Justice of the Supreme Court of the Philippines, heart attack
- October 20 – Jamalul Kiram III, 75, Sultanate of Sulu, organ failure
- October 27 – F. Landa Jocano, 83, Anthropologist, pneumonia
- October 31 – Andres Narvasa, 84, Chief Justice, pneumonia
- November 4 – Fr. Joe Dizon, 65, Activist priest, diabetes
- November 13 – Onesimo Cadiz Gordoncillo, 78, Filipino Roman Catholic archbishop, lung cancer
- November 24 – June Keithley, 66, Veteran broadcaster, breast cancer
- November 27 – Manuel F. Segura, 94, Cebuano World War II veteran and author, pneumonia
- December 13 – Delfin Bangit, 58, 39th Chief of Staff of the Armed Forces of the Philippines, multiple organ failure
- December 25 – Ismael Mathay, Jr., 81, former mayor of Quezon City, cardiac arrest
