= 2013 in Philippine sports =

- Years in Philippine sports: 2010 2011 2012 2013 2014 2015 2016
- Centuries: 20th century · 21st century · 22nd century
- Decades: 1980s 1990s 2000s 2010s 2020s 2030s 2040s
- Years: 2010 2011 2012 2013 2014 2015 2016

The following is a list of notable events and developments that are related to Philippine sports in 2013.

== Events ==
=== Basketball ===
==== Professional ====
- May 19 – the Alaska Aces defeat the Barangay Ginebra San Miguel by sweeping the series, 3–0, with Alaska winning its first championship (13th overall) after Tim Cone's tenure with the Aces. to win the 2013 PBA Commissioner's Cup Championship.
- October 25: The San Mig Coffee Mixers were crowned as the champions of the 2013 PBA Governors' Cup Finals after beating Petron Blaze Boosters in the Game 7 of the finals series, 87–77. Marc Pingris was crowned as the Finals MVP

=== National teams ===
- August 1–11: The 2013 FIBA Asia Championship was hosted by the Philippines from August 1–11, 2013 and held at the Mall of Asia Arena in Pasay.

=== Volleyball ===
- March 6 – La Salle defeated Ateneo in three sets, 25–23, 25–20, 25–16, to finish the series in two games and win their eighth UAAP women's volleyball championship title. Michele Gumabao was named the Most Valuable Player (MVP) of the Finals.
- July 7 – The inaugural tournament of the Philippine Super Liga were held at the Filoil Flying V Arena in San Juan.

== Deaths ==
- January 7: Gonzalo G. Puyat II, 79, former president of FIBA
- August 12: Karyn Cecilia Velez, 24, badminton sensation, road accident
- August 21: Rodolfo Tan Cardoso, 75, Filipino chess player, heart attack

== See also ==
- 2013 in the Philippines
- 2013 in sports
