= Killing of Leonard Co, Sofronio Cortez, and Julius Borromeo =

The killing of Botanist Leonard Co, forester Sofronio Cortez, and farmer Julius Borromeo took place on November 15, 2010, while the three were working on a biodiversity project under the auspices of the Energy Development Corporation. Nine members of the 19th Infantry Battalion of the Philippine Army's 8th Infantry Division claimed that Co's group had been caught in the crossfire in a fight between their unit and the New People's Army, but this claim was challenged by numerous investigating groups, including the Philippine National Police and the Philippines' Commission on Human Rights. The Department of Justice eventually filed charges against the soldiers involved, and the case is currently in the courts.

Co, who was considered the foremost authority in ethnobotany in the Philippines at the time of his death, was examining a tree when the shooting began, while Cortez and Borromeo were helping him.

== Aftermath ==
During his wake, Co was conferred the rare honor of having his coffin briefly displayed in front of the University of the Philippines Diliman's copy of the UP Oblation - the iconic symbol of the University of the Philippines. On the anniversary of the incident on November 15, 2023, the Leonard Co Ethnobotanical Garden was inaugurated at the Northwestern University to honor Co's contribution to Philippine botany.

== Public concern about Red-tagging ==
The Killing of Co, Cortez, and Borromeo helped call public attention to the practice of Red-tagging in the Philippines, in which individuals or organizations are branded, usually by military sources, as communists, subversives, or terrorists, regardless of their actual political beliefs or affiliations.

== In media ==
- In 2012, botanist and environmentalist Nannette Matilac released "Walang Hanggang Buhay ni Leonardo Co" (Immortal Life of Leonardo Co) a documentary by Nannette Matilac exploring the life of Co, including his killing alongside Cortez and Borromeo. The film featured narration from Co's daughter, Linnaea Marie Co.
