= Ulysses Ferreras =

Ulysses Flores Ferreras is a Filipino botanist (plant taxonomist), working as Research Associate at Philippine Native Plants Conservation Society

== Publications by Ferreras ==
The standard author abbreviation Ferreras is used to indicate this person as the author when citing a botanical name.

- Ferreras, U.F., . 2012. "The Plants of El Nido, Palawan"
- Thomas E Marler. & Ferreras. 2014. Differential leaflet mortality may influence biogeochemical cycling following tropical cyclones.

Commun Integr Biol.

- Raab Bustamante, Maximilian Kindler & U. Ferreras (2015) Die Orchidee (Hamburg) 66: 370.
- Bulbophyllum translucidum Kindler, R.Bustam. & Ferreras, Orchidee (Hamburg) 2(4)E: 4, figs. 1-7 (2016).
- Bulbophyllum vespertilio Ferreras & Cootes, OrchideenJ. 17(4): 150 (149-151; figs.) (2010).
- Diplycosia bartolomei Ferreras & Argent, Edinburgh J. Bot. 68(1): 39 (-42; fig. 1) (2011).
- Dischidia bulacanensis Kloppenb., G.Mend. & Ferreras, Hoya New 2(1): 20 (2014).
- Eupatorium leonardii Ferreras & E.E.Lamont, Brittonia 64(4): 369 (2012).
- Euphlebium rhodochilum Ferreras & Cootes, OrchideenJ. 17(2): 54 (-57; figs.) (2010).
- Hoya acanthominima Kloppenb., G.Mend. & Ferreras, Hoya New 1(1): 22 (2013).
- Hoya amrita Kloppenb., Siar & Ferreras, Asklepios 110: 27 (-29; figs.) (2011).
- Hoya apoensis subsp. sagittaria Kloppenb., Siar & Ferreras, Hoya New 1(2): 3 (2013).
- Hoya apoensis var. sagittarius Kloppenb., Siar & Ferreras, Fraterna 23(4): 5 (-8; figs.) (2010), nom. inval.
- Hoya bandongii Kloppenb. & Ferreras, Fraterna 24(4): 9 (-12; figs.) (2011).
- Hoya carmelae Kloppenb., Siar & Ferreras, Fraterna 23(4): 9 (-13; figs.) (2010).
- Hoya chiekoae Kloppenb., Ferreras & G.Mend., Hoya New 1(4): 17 (2013).
- Hoya corazoniae Kloppenb., Siar & Ferreras, Fraterna 23(4): 15 (-19; figs.) (2010).
- Hoya coriacea subsp. philippinensis Kloppenb., Siar & Ferreras, Hoya New 1(4): 44 (2013).
- Hoya cupula Kloppenb., G.Mend. & Ferreras, Hoya New 1(1): 15 (2013).POWO
- Hoya heuschkeliana subsp. marionii Kloppenb. & Ferreras, Hoya New 2(1): 26 (2014).
- Hoya irisiae Ferreras, Kloppenb. & Tandang, Hoya New 2(2): 3 (2014).POWO
- Hoya isabelaensis Kloppenb., Siar & Ferreras, Fraterna 24(4): 24 (-28; figs.) (2011).
- Hoya kanlaonensis Kloppenb., Siar & Ferreras, Fraterna 23(4): 24 (-27; figs.) (2010).
