= 46th Infantry Battalion =

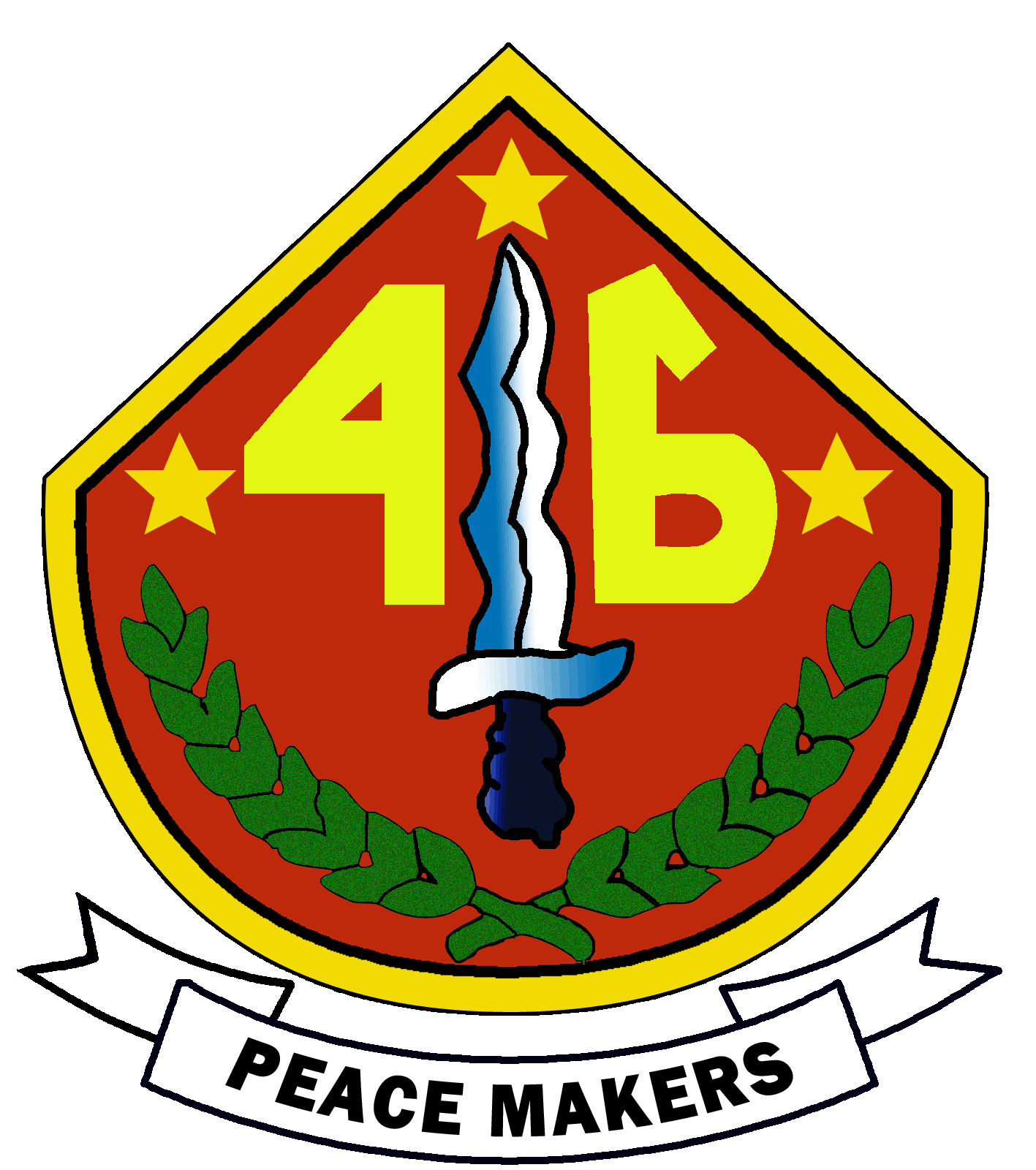
- 46IB logo
- Active: April 1, 2003 - Present
- Country: Philippines
- Allegiance: Republic of the Philippines
- Branch: Philippine Army
- Type: Light Infantry
- Role: Conventional Warfare, Anti-Insurgency Operations, Light Reaction Force
- Size: 3 Rifle Companies. Total of 500+ soldiers
- Part of: Under the Philippine Army
- Garrison/HQ: Brgy Literon, Calbiga, Samar
- Nickname: Peace Makers
- Motto: Hoo Hah! Four Six
- Anniversaries: April 1
- Engagements: Anti-guerilla operations against the NPA, MILF, [Kidnap-for-Ransom Group],

Commanders
- Current commander: LTC Marvin Inocencio (July 2025)

Insignia
- Unit Patch: 46IB Emblem

The 46th Infantry Battalion of the Philippine Army is an organic unit of the 8th Infantry (Storm Troopers) Division. Their primary task is to secure the peace and order in the areas of Eastern Visayas, especially the province of Western Samar which was noted for its deteriorated peace and order situation. Currently, the 500-man-battalion are garrisoned and stationed at Brgy Literon, Calbiga, Samar.

Equipment: M16 Rifle M4 Carbine M14 Rifle M1911 Pistol M60 Machine Gun
