= DOST–PAGASA Mindanao Planetarium =

Planetarium in El Salvador, Philippines

- Coordinates: 8°32′10″N 124°33′28″E
- Type: Planetarium
- Owner: Philippine Atmospheric, Geophysical and Astronomical Services Administration
- Building details

General information
- Status: Completed
- Location: El Salvador, Misamis Oriental, Philippines
- Groundbreaking: March 15, 2019
- Construction started: February 27, 2020
- Inaugurated: May 17, 2024

The DOST–PAGASA Mindanao Planetarium, also known as the MPRSD Planetarium, is a planetarium in El Salvador, Misamis Oriental, Philippines. It is under the Mindanao PAGASA Regional Services Division (MPRSD) of PAGASA of the Department of Science and Technology (DOST). It is the first planetarium in Mindanao.

== History ==
The groundbreaking for the DOST–PAGASA Mindanao Planetarium took place on March 15, 2019. Contractor GCMG Construction was the contractor for the project, which was supposed to be completed by November 22, 2019. The Commission on Audit (COA) flagged the planetarium project due to it not being finished by that date.

Actual construction work began on February 27, 2020, which was further impacted by the COVID-19 pandemic. It was inaugurated on May 17, 2024.

== Facilities ==
The 755 m^{2} (8,130 sq ft) facility has astronomy galleries, a dome-shaped projection theatre, and an observatory.
