= Camp Lukban =

Philippine military base in Catbalogan, Samar

Camp Vicente Lukban
- Catbalogan, Samar in Philippines

Site information
- Type: Military base
- Controlled by: Philippines

Location
- Coordinates: 11°47′25″N 124°52′02″E

Site history
- Built: 1988
- In use: 1988–present
- Materials: Concrete and Metal
- Battles/wars: World War II; Operation Enduring Freedom - Philippines

Garrison information
- Current commander: MGEN Gerardo T. Layug, AFP
- Garrison: 8th Infantry Division (Army)

Camp General Vicente Lukban (CGVL) is a military headquarters of the Armed Forces of the Philippines (AFP) located in Catbalogan, Samar. It is situated along the Pan-Philippine Highway in Barangay Maulong. The military base is named after the Filipino Military General, Vicente Lukbán, a Filipino officer in Emilio Aguinaldo's staff during the Philippine Revolution and the politico-military chief of Samar and Leyte during the Philippine–American War.

== History ==
Barangay Maulong in Catbalogan, Samar first became the site of a Philippine Constabulary camp in 1935, during the Philippine Commonwealth. After the Japanese occupation ended at the end of World War II, the camp was reestablished and named Camp Lukban in honor of Philippine Revolutionary General Vicente Lukbán. It was still under the Constabulary in 1972 when Ferdinand Marcos placed the Philippines under Martial Law. It then became a detention center for political detainees under the Marcos dictatorship, under the administration of Regional Command for Detainees III (RECAD III) in Camp Lapu-Lapu, Cebu City. In this capacity, it was the site of various human rights violations documented by Amnesty International in 1981.

It was on August 1, 1988, two years after Ferdinand Marcos was ousted by the 1986 People Power Revolution, that Camp Lukban became the headquarters of the 8th Infantry Division of the Philippine Army (known officially as the Stormtroopers Division), when that unit - then known as the "8th Infantry Brigade (separate)" - was transferred from its previous Area of Responsibility (AoR) in Leyte and elevated to its current status as a Division.

== See also ==
- Military history of the Philippines
- Military history of the Philippines during World War II
- Philippine Army
- Philippine Air Force
- Philippine Navy and Philippine Marine Corps
