= Philippine Native Plants Conservation Society =

The Philippine Native Plants Conservation Society, Inc. (PNPCSI) is a non-profit organization located in Quezon City, Philippines. The society was founded in 2007. The founding president of the society was Leonardo Legaspi Co.

== Purpose of the society ==
The society is devoted to the conservation of indigenous Philippine plants and their natural habitats. The society is made up of people from many walks of life which include academics, government agencies, non-government agencies, plant enthusiasts, and garden clubs and horticulture groups.
