= 2010 in Philippine sports =

The following is a list of notable events and developments that are related to Philippine sports in 2010.

== Events ==
=== Basketball ===
- March 3 – The Purefoods TJ Giants won the PBA Philippine Cup crown with a 4–0 series victory over Alaska Aces. The title-conquest was their 8th championship.
- August 18 – The Alaska Aces won their 13th league championship with a 4–2 series victory over the defending PBA Fiesta Conference champions San Miguel Beermen.

=== Billiards ===
- September 7 – 12 – The fifth World Cup of Pool championship. It was held at the Robinsons Place Manila in Manila, Philippines.

=== Boxing ===
- February 13 – Nonito Donaire knocksout Manuel Vargas in the third round to defend his interim WBA world super flyweight title.
- March 13 – Manny Pacquiao defeats Joshua Clottey, controlling the fight from start to finish and winning by unanimous decision. This was the first boxing match held at Cowboys Stadium in Arlington, Texas, drawing more than 41,000 people. This was Pacquiao's first defense of his newly awarded WBO welterweight title.
- May 13 – Manny Pacquiao is officially proclaimed congressman of the lone district of Sarangani.
- June 28 – Manny Pacquiao takes his oath of office as a congressman before Supreme Court Associate Justice Antonio T. Carpio in the Provincial Capitol of Sarangani in Municipality of Alabel.
- November 13 – Manny Pacquiao defeats Antonio Margarito for the WBC super welterweight title, making Pacquiao the first and so far only boxer to win world titles in eight different weight classes.
- December 4 — Nonito Donaire won against Wladimir Sidorenko via knockout in the fourth round to win the vacant WBC Continental Americas bantamweight title.

=== Football ===
- December 6 – The Philippines national football team defeated Vietnam by the score of 2–0 in the 2010 AFF Suzuki Cup, in what is considered one of the biggest upsets ever recorded in the regional tournament.

== Deaths ==
- January 18: Celestino Tugot, 99, Filipino professional golfer
- April 18: Ricardo Marata, 45, former PBA guard (born 1964)
- May 3: Florencio Campomanes, 83, Filipino chess player, President Emeritus of FIDE (born 1927)
- November 1: Ernesto Presas, 65, martial arts grandmaster. (born 1945)

== See also ==
- 2010 in the Philippines
- 2010 in sports
