= El Salvador, Misamis Oriental =

Component city in Misamis Oriental, Philippines

El Salvador Tagnipa
- Component city
- City of El Salvador
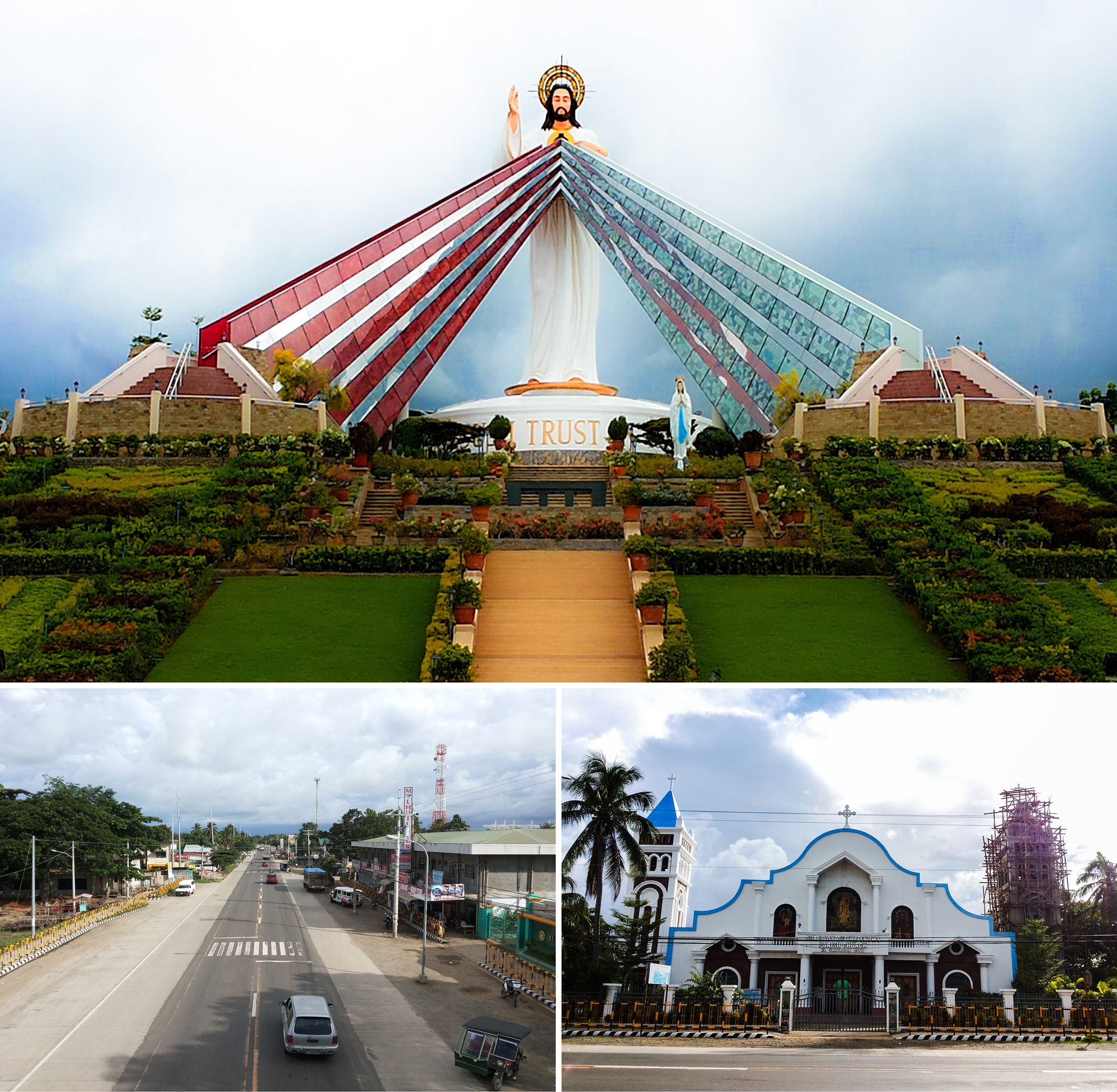
- From left to right: Divine Mercy Shrine; Barangay Poblacion of El Salvador; Our Lady of the Snows Parish Church

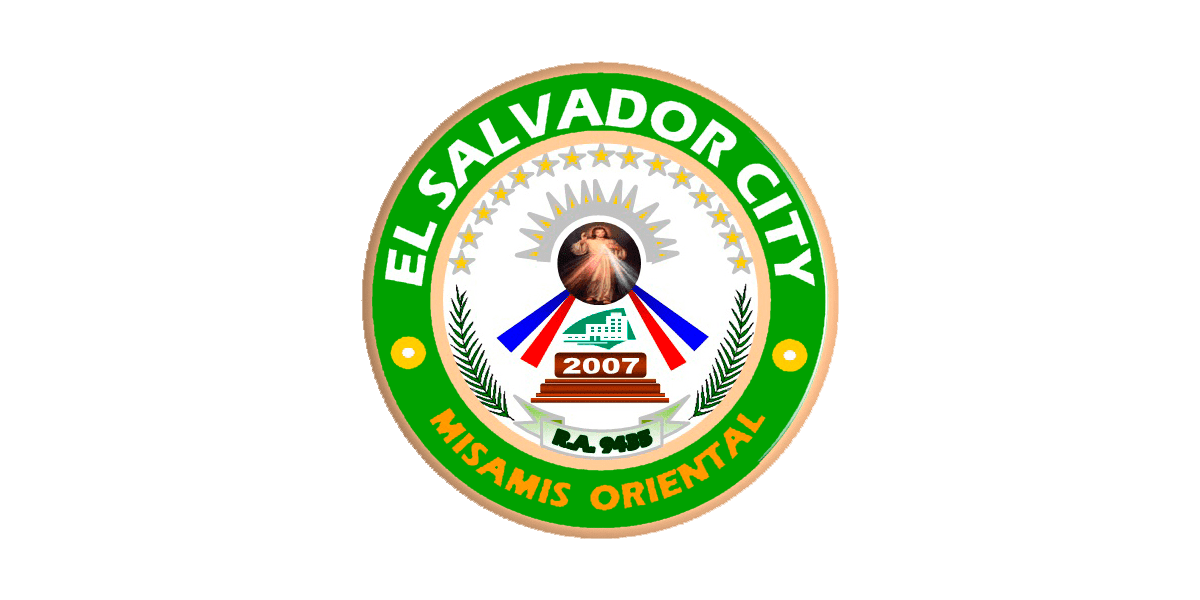
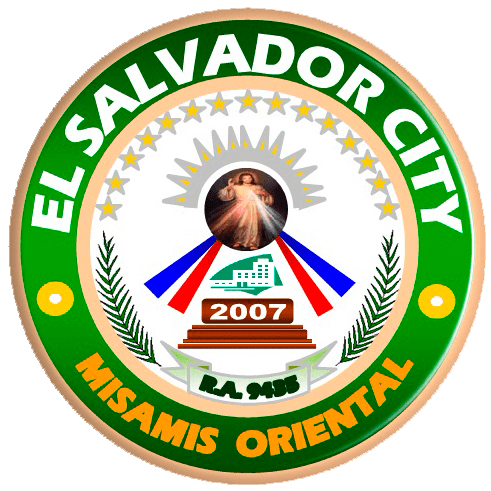
- Flag Seal
- Anthem: Tagnipan-ong Paraiso
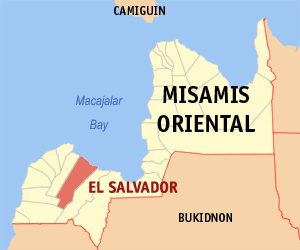
- Map of Misamis Oriental with El Salvador highlighted
- Interactive map of El Salvador
- Location within the Philippines
- Coordinates: 8°34′N 124°31′E
- Country: Philippines
- Region: Northern Mindanao
- Province: Misamis Oriental
- District: 2nd district
- Founded: June 15, 1948
- Cityhood: June 27, 2007 (Lost cityhood in 2008 and 2010)
- Affirmed Cityhood: February 15, 2011
- Barangays: 15 (see Barangays)

Government
  - Type: Sangguniang Panlungsod
  - Mayor: Edgar S. Lignes
  - Vice Mayor: Agripino D. Estrada Jr.
  - Representative: Yevgeny Vicente B. Emano
  - City Council: Members: John Mark T. Noble; Kent Tristan O. Lignes; Jeen Ellen Grace Y. Clarin; Reynaldo L. Dangcal Jr; Rafael Pedro C. Baculio; Norie Lou M. Enerio; Eduardo A. Ayunting; Vacant
  - Electorate: 46,809 voters (2025)

Area
  - Total: 106.15 km^{2} (40.98 sq mi)
- Elevation: 79 m (259 ft)
- Highest elevation: 998 m (3,274 ft)
- Lowest elevation: 0 m (0 ft)

Population (2024 census)
  - Total: 62,126
  - Density: 585.27/km^{2} (1,515.8/sq mi)
  - Households: 15,121
- Demonym(s): Salvadoreños, Salbadorenyos, Tagnipan-ons

Economy
  - Income class: 4th city income class
  - Poverty incidence: 20.76% (2023)
  - Revenue: ₱ 927 million (2024)
  - Assets: ₱ 2,311 million (2024)
  - Expenditure: ₱ 762.7 million (2024)
  - Liabilities: ₱ 517 million (2024)

Service provider
  - Electricity: Misamis Oriental 1 Rural Electric Cooperative (MORESCO 1)
- Time zone: UTC+8 (PST)
- ZIP code: 9017
- PSGC: 104307000
- IDD : area code: +63 (0)88
- Native languages: Cebuano; Binukid; Subanon; Tagalog
- Feast date: Sunday after Easter
- Catholic diocese: Archdiocese of Cagayan de Oro
- Patron saint: The Divine Mercy
- Website: elsalvadorcity.gov.ph

El Salvador, officially the City of El Salvador (Cebuano: Dakbayan sa El Salvador; Filipino: Lungsod ng El Salvador), is a component city in the province of Misamis Oriental, Philippines. According to the 2026 census, it has a population of 62,126 people.

The city serves as a pilgrimage site for Divine Mercy devotees. It is also known by its former name Tagnipa, which residents still refer to up to this day.

== History ==
During Spanish colonial era, a soldier named Alejandro Acusar sailed with his family from Bohol to the area what is now El Salvador to seek a new life. From a distance while sailing, they sighted a place and decided to dock. They found a place to have abundant nipa huts, in which they named it Taganipa, Tagnipa or Taguipa. Acusar and his small family had then established themselves through farming and fishing. A wave of migrants from Bohol later followed as well as settlers from Luzon, other parts of Visayas and neighboring areas surrounding Taganipa settled in the area following years later, establishing themselves as farmers and fisherfolks.

El Salvador was created from the barrios of El Salvador and Molugan with their sitios known as Sala, Sambulawan, Sinaloc, Lagtang, Talaba, Kalabaylabay and Hinigdaan, formerly part of Cagayan de Misamis, Misamis Oriental, in 1948.

=== Etymology ===
The city's name means "the savior" in Spanish, pertaining that the city used to provide crops of corn and vegetables to the neighboring places struck by famine at some point in the city's history. Soon these places were saved through the continuous agricultural support, resulting in the town of Tagnipa to be renamed as El Salvador to the people's approval.

=== Cityhood ===
On June 27, 2007, the municipality of El Salvador becomes a city in the province of Misamis Oriental after ratification of Republic Act 9435.

The Supreme Court declared the cityhood law of El Salvador and 15 other cities unconstitutional after a petition filed by the League of Cities of the Philippines in its ruling on November 18, 2008. On December 22, 2009, the cityhood law of El Salvador and 15 other municipalities regain its status as cities again after the court reversed its ruling on November 18, 2008. On August 23, 2010, the court reinstated its ruling on November 18, 2008, causing El Salvador and the other 15 cities to become regular municipalities. Finally, on February 15, 2011, El Salvador became a city again, as well as the other 15 municipalities, upon the declaration that the conversion to cityhood met all legal requirements.

After six years of legal battle, in its board resolution, the League of Cities of the Philippines acknowledged and recognized the cityhood of El Salvador and 15 other cities.

== Geography ==
El Salvador is located in the Province of Misamis Oriental in Northern Mindanao (Region X). It is bordered by the Municipality of Alubijid to the west, Opol to the east and Manticao and Naawan to the south. On the north, lies Macajalar Bay of the Bohol Sea.

=== Barangays ===
El Salvador is politically subdivided into 15 barangays. Each barangay consists of puroks while some have sitios.

One forms the center of the city (poblacion) whereas the other 14 are in the outlying areas. Some of them are even several kilometers away from the center of the city.

- Amoros
- Bolisong
- Cogon
- Himaya
- Hinigdaan
- Kalabaylabay
- Molugan
- Pedro S. Baculio (Bolo-Bolo)
- Poblacion
- Quibonbon
- Sambulawan
- San Francisco de Asis (Calongonan)
- Sinaloc
- Taytay
- Ulaliman

=== Climate ===
Climate data for El Salvador City, Misamis Oriental
Month	Jan	Feb	Mar	Apr	May	Jun	Jul	Aug	Sep	Oct	Nov	Dec	Year
Mean daily maximum °C (°F)	28 (82)	29 (84)	30 (86)	31 (88)	30 (86)	30 (86)	30 (86)	30 (86)	30 (86)	30 (86)	29 (84)	29 (84)	30 (85)
Mean daily minimum °C (°F)	24 (75)	24 (75)	24 (75)	25 (77)	26 (79)	26 (79)	25 (77)	25 (77)	25 (77)	25 (77)	25 (77)	25 (77)	25 (77)
Average precipitation mm (inches)	271 (10.7)	217 (8.5)	193 (7.6)	178 (7.0)	344 (13.5)	423 (16.7)	362 (14.3)	358 (14.1)	329 (13.0)	320 (12.6)	322 (12.7)	260 (10.2)	3,577 (140.9)
Average rainy days	23.2	19.5	22.0	22.8	29.6	28.9	30.3	29.8	28.1	28.8	26.1	24.1	313.2
Source: Meteoblue

== Demographics ==
Population census of El Salvador
Year	Pop.	±% p.a.
1903	4,315	—
1948	16,899	+3.08%
1960	10,521	−3.87%
1970	14,529	+3.28%
1975	16,915	+3.10%
1980	20,446	+3.86%
1990	26,721	+2.71%
1995	31,500	+3.13%
2000	34,650	+2.06%
2007	41,905	+2.66%
2010	44,848	+2.50%
2015	50,204	+2.17%
2020	58,771	+3.37%
2024	62,126	+1.34%
Source: Philippine Statistics Authority

=== Ethnicities and Religion ===
Local inhabitants of El Salvador, known as Salvadoreños/Salvadoreñas (also spelled Salbadorenyos/Salbadorenyas) or Tagnipan-ons, consists of Visayans who are the descendants of Christian migrants mostly from Bohol and Cebu; the indigenous Higaonons who first settled in the area; and the descendants of other Christian settlers from Ilocandia, Cagayan Valley, Cordillera Administrative Region, Central Luzon, Calabarzon, Marinduque, Mindoro, Bicolandia in Luzon and Panay and Negros Occidental in Visayas.

Majority of Tagnipan-ons are Roman Catholic Christians, represented by about 85%, including charismatics. The rest belongs to other Christian denominations such as Evangelical churches, Baptists, Seventh-Day Adventist church, Iglesia Filipina Independiente (Aglipayan church), Members Church of God International/Ang Dating Daan (MCGI, ADD), Iglesia ni Cristo, Pentecostal church and Presbyterian church.

=== Language ===
Cebuano is the main language of El Salvador spoken by the majority, though Higaonon is the native language spoken by eponymous Higaonons who are indigenous inhabitants of El Salvador and the rest of Misamis Oriental. The city has also sizeable speakers of Bohol dialect of Cebuano. Tagalog/Filipino and English are also spoken and used for business, government affairs and in local academe. Other languages spoken in El Salvador are Subanon, Hiligaynon, Ilocano and Kapampangan.

== Economy ==
Poverty incidence of El Salvador (%)

Source: Philippine Statistics Authority

El Salvador hosts several companies, plants and factories west of Misamis Oriental. These are Asia Brewery, Tanduay Rhum, Virgin Cola Bottling Plant (Visayas and Mindanao region distributor), Highland Fresh Daily Products, Monark Equipment, Zest-O, WL Foods Corporation and Universal Robina Corporation.

With regards to financial institutions, Rural Bank of El Salvador and lending institutions such as FICCO, Oro Coop, M Lhuillier and others are accessible at office hours in this place.

== Attractions ==
- Divine Mercy Shrine, located in the Divine Mercy Hills, PSB-Ulaliman which is overlooking Macajalar Bay. The shrine has a 50-foot statue of the Divine Mercy Christ, the biggest in Asia. It serves as a pilgrimage site for the Divine Mercy devotees. As a pilgrimage and sacred site, visitors are not allowed to wear shorts and other revealing clothing. Those who do so will be forced to cover themselves with a blue cloth provided by the shrine administrators.
- Burias Island, located just a few kilometers off the coast of Molugan or about 3 km west of the town of Opol. Not to be confused with the island of the same name, located northeast of Masbate in Bicol Region.
- El Salvador Night Cafè, is set up on nights at Barangay Poblacion. Tagnipa-ons and visitors gather to have food, Filipino barbecue, beer and to enjoy the live band music.
- Our Lady of Snows Parish Church, newly constructed church located within the city.
- Abaga & Sikiop Falls, Located in barangay San Francisco de Asis.
- Tag-ilas Falls, Located in barangay Hinigdaan.
- Tuburan Spring, Located in barangay Poblacion .
- House of Pasalubong, Located in Zone 2, Barangay Poblacion
- DOST–PAGASA Mindanao Planetarium, located in Barangay Molugan it is the first and only planetarium in Mindanao operated by PAGASA.

== Culture ==
Feast day:

- August 5 (Our Lady of Snows)
- August 16 (Saint Roch (aka San Roque))

Charter day: June 27

== Infrastructure ==
=== Transportation ===
El Salvador city can be reached via plane through Laguindingan Airport, then about less than 10 minutes bus ride east. Like any other place the national highway snakes through it. Visitors and locals can go around the city by just hailing a "sikad-sikad" or motorboat, "jeepneys" or motorcycles to the outlying barangays.

=== Communication ===
PLDT and MISORTEL are among the major phone lines, also transmitters or "cell sites" for all major "telecom" providers like Globe, Smart and Dito are serviceable in this city. Internet access is also available. Internet cafes can be found in various places in within the city. Broadband service is also available.

== Sister cities ==
- San Juan, Metro Manila

== Persona non grata ==
- Richard Heydarian
