= Monark Equipment Corporation =

Manufacturer in the Philippines

- Founded: 1987
- Area served: Philippines
- Website: Official Website

Monark Equipment Corporation is a family-owned Filipino corporation, and is a dealer and importer of heavy equipment and generator sets. It is the exclusive authorized dealer of Caterpillar products in the Philippines and prominently features the Caterpillar logo and the Caterpillar Yellow livery as part of its company logo. It distributes other European and North American brands, including Tadano cranes, Heavy Equipment and Industrial Tires, and Putzmeister Concrete Pumps. The company is a member of the Monark Group of Companies.

Monark Equipment Corporation provides heavy equipment in the agricultural, manufacturing, industrial, construction, mining, quarrying, marine and power sectors. It has a network of branches all over the country in order to provide repair and maintenance services for its heavy equipment. Monark Equipment Corporation is one of the top 500 non-individual taxpayers in the Philippines in 2014, ranking 167 and paying more than 225 million pesos in taxes.

== Company history ==
Monark Equipment Corporation was incorporated in 1987, by Louie and Jan-B Banson after they acquired the right to become the sole authorized dealer of Caterpillar Equipment in the Philippines. Its parent company, Monark International Incorporated, was found by their father Onofre in 1962. MII was one of the first to utilize Caterpillar machines in the country, deploying them in Monark's forestry operations. Throughout the seventies and eighties, MII was involved in some of the largest infrastructure projects in the country, frequently in partnership with the government or other private-sector companies.

Monark Equipment Corporation projects in the sixties included the Angat water reservoir and hydroelectric dam, the US military bases in Subic, Clark and Sangley Point, and the building excavations of the Makati Medical Center, the Makati Stock Exchange, the Sheraton, and the corporate headquarters of San Miguel Corporation, and the Philippine Long Distance Telephone Company.

As a joint venture partner in the 1970s up to 1985, Monark was involved in major infrastructure projects such as the Magat and Pantabagan dams, the NLEX and Iloilo highways and the Masiway, and Makban Geothermal power plants.

In 2015, the company was awarded its ISO 9001: 2008 certification.

== Company Highlights ==
In November 2013, following the devastation wrought by Typhoon Haiyan (known as Yolanda in the Philippines), Monark, through its non-profit Monark Foundation, provided aid to the survivors in devastated areas. Monark's Cat Rental Store provided forklifts to help with repacking of relief goods at repacking stations as well as providing generator sets to the government of Ormoc. Monark has entered into partnerships with non-profit organizations such as the International Relief and Development (IRD) to plan for long-term rehabilitation, relief and clearing operations. In addition, Monark employees have volunteered for various relief efforts, working with the Department of Social Welfare and Development and other relief agencies to distribute aid packages and feed survivors.

In October 2013, Monark Equipment Corporation issued four billion pesos worth of corporate notes to finance its long-term debt service requirements. The notes have a five-year maturity period and China Banking Corporation is the lead underwriter and issue manager.

As a member of the Philippine Business for Social Progress, Monark, along with other member-companies, helped provide assistance to over 700,000 families in the areas of education, health, environment and enterprise and livelihood development. From 2012 to 2014, the business-led development organization disbursed some 3.8 billion pesos for health programs, 103 million pesos for livelihood assistance, 101 million pesos for education and 33 million pesos for environment programs.

=== Affiliate Companies ===
Monark Foundation Institute is the non-profit arm of Monark Equipment Corporation and provides vocational and skills training to high school graduates and out-of-school youth.

Castle Power Philippines is the sole distributor in the country of Perkins services and products. It is the exclusive distributor of China-based Shandong Shem Machinery, which is a manufacturer of heavy machinery that is wholly owned by Caterpillar.

PowerAsia Equipment Resources is the exclusive distributor of FG Wilson products in the Philippines.

SITECH is the distributor of Trimble heavy equipment products which are marketed to the local construction industry.

=== Branches and Satellite Offices ===
For 29 years, Monark continuously grow to cover the needs of its market.

Monark Equipment has now over 13 branches over the Philippines covering parts of Luzon ( Quezon City, Caloocan, Bicol Region, Laguna, and Pampanga), Visayas ( Bacolod, Cebu, and Iloilo City), and Mindanao ( Cagayan de Oro, Davao, El Salvador, General Santos, Surigao, and Zamboanga City).

Considered as the ‘Largest Footprint in the Industry’, Monark's mining sector covers 10 mine site projects which includes Didipio, Masbate, Taganito, Agata, and Tubay in Agusan province, Siana in Surigao, and other projects located in Leyte, Palawan, and Cagayan de Oro.
