= Tunggan Mangudadatu Piang =

Filipino politician

Tunggan Mangudadatu Piang (died July 8, 2013) was a Filipino politician. He was ARMM MLA for Maguindanao.

== Death ==
Piang died of a heart attack on July 8, 2013.
