= Morong 43 =

- Location: Philippines
- Field: Community Medicine

Morong 43 is a group of 43 health workers in the Philippines tagged by government of the Philippines as members of the New People's Army. Members of the Morong 43 were arrested in Morong, Rizal, on 6 February 2010, allegedly on the grounds of illegal possession of firearms and explosives.

On 20 June 2015, Philippine Commission on Human Rights (CHR) released a resolution noting that the health workers were arrested without a valid warrant and that their bodies bore torture marks, allegedly inflicted by Philippine Army personnel. The CHR recommended action against all arresting, detaining, and investigating officers for violating Sec. 4 of Republic Act 7438 (Pertaining to Rights of Persons Arrested).

President Benigno Aquino III said that members of the Morong 43 were denied due process and in December 2015 ordered their release from detention.

The arrests of the Morong 43 have often been cited as an example of red-baiting in the Philippines.
