= 19th Infantry Battalion =

Philippine Army unit

The 19th Infantry Battalion of the Philippine Army (referred to as the 19IB PA, or simply the 19IB) is an organic unit of the 8th Infantry (Storm Troopers) Division.

== Headquarters ==
The is currently stationed in the Eastern Visayas region, with its headquarters in Catubig, Northern Samar.

== Prior assignments ==
19IB had been assigned to the 10th Infantry Division in Arakan, Cotabato for a four year stint until 2020, and had been based in Kananga, Leyte under the 8th Infantry Division prior to its Cotabato assignment.

== Notable incidents ==
=== 1993 Disappearance of Robin and Diorito Trosing ===
Amnesty International noted an incident on 31 May 1993 in which Palapag, Northern Samar farmers Robin and Diorito Trosing were taken for questioning by the 19IB and a local Citizen Armed Force Geographical Group (CAFGU) unit. Amnesty noted that many of the individuals in such cases are "presumed to have been killed in detention.

=== 2007 labor leader arrest ===
In May 2007, the 19IB was the unit which oversaw the high profile arrest of labor leader Vincent Borja, who was found innocent and released three years later in 2010.

=== 2010 Killing of Leonardo Co, Sofronio Cortez, and Julius Borromeo ===
The 19th Infantry Battalion (19IB), which was under the command of 1Lt Ronald Odchimar at the time, became involved in a widely publicized incident on November 15, 2010, in which preeminent Filipino botanist Leonardo Co, a forest guard named Sofronio Cortez and a local farmer named Julius Borromeo, who were gathering endangered tree species seedlings in Kananga, Leyte, were killed in what the Army claimed to be "a crossfire with the New People’s Army".

Members of the army unit claimed that Co's group had been caught in the crossfire in a fight between their unit and the New People's Army, but this claim was challenged by numerous investigating groups, including the Philippine National Police and the Philippines' Commission on Human Rights. The Department of Justice eventually filed charges against the soldiers involved, and the case is currently in the courts, charging nine soldiers with reckless imprudence resulting in multiple homicide. The Co family's appeal to the DOJ to upgrade the charges to murder remains pending as of 2022.
