= Rodolfo Tan Cardoso =

Filipino chess player (1937–2013)

Personal information
- Born: 25 December 1937 Anda, Pangasinan, Philippines
- Died: 21 August 2013 (aged 75) Quezon City, Metro Manila, Philippines

Chess career
- Country: Philippines
- Title: International Master (1957)
- Peak rating: 2410 (January 1975)

Rodolfo Tan Cardoso (25 December 1937 – 21 August 2013) was a Filipino chess player. He was awarded the International Master title by FIDE in 1957, making him the first Asian to achieve it.

Cardoso was born in Anda, Pangasinan. In 1956, he won Philippine Junior Championship. In 1957, he took fifth place in the fourth World Junior Championship in Toronto, which was won by William Lombardy with a perfect score of 11–0. In the same year, the Pepsi-Cola company sponsored an eight-game match in New York City between Cardoso, the 19-year-old Philippine junior champion, and Bobby Fischer, the 14-year-old U.S. junior champion. He was the only Filipino to beat Fischer. Fischer claimed the $325 victor's prize with a 6−2 score (+5 –1 =2).

In 1957/58, Cardoso won the zonal tournament in Baguio City, thus qualifying him for the 1958 Portorož Interzonal tournament, in which he finished 19th (Mikhail Tal won). In this tournament he scored an upset win over David Bronstein in the final round, thereby denying him a place in the 1959 Candidates' Tournament but also allowing Fischer a place in the candidates. He was Philippine Champion in 1958 and 1963. He took second place at Christchurch 1967 (New Zealand championship, won by Yuri Averbakh). In 1974, he tied for first through fourth place in Casablanca. In 1974, he took 14th in Manila (Evgeni Vasiukov won). In 1975, he tied for 13-14th in Orense. In 1975, he took 10th in Las Palmas (Ruy Lopez Memorial tournament, won by Ljubomir Ljubojević).

Cardoso played for Philippines in four Chess Olympiads.

- In 1956, at fourth board in the 12th Chess Olympiad in Moscow (+11 –2 =4);
- In 1958, at first board in the 13th Chess Olympiad in Munich (+10 –4 =5);
- In 1972, at second board in the 20th Chess Olympiad in Skopje (+10 –4 =3);
- In 1974, at second board in the 21st Chess Olympiad in Nice (+9 –6 =4).

He won the individual silver medal at Moscow 1956 with his winning percentage of 76.5.

Cardoso died of a heart attack in Quezon City at the Philippine Heart Center on 21 August 2013.
