= 8th Infantry Division (Philippines) =

Eighth Infantry Division
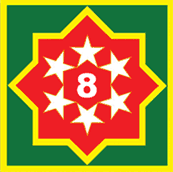
- Coat of Arms of the 8ID
- Active: August 1, 1988 – present
- Country: Philippines
- Branch: Philippine Army
- Type: Infantry
- Role: Conventional Warfare, Anti-Guerrilla Operations
- Size: 3 Brigades
- Part of: Philippine Army (Since 1988)
- Garrison/HQ: Camp General Vicente Lukban, Catbalogan, Samar
- Nickname: Storm Trooper Division
- Anniversaries: August 1
- Engagements: Communist and Islamic Insurgency in the Philippines; Operation Enduring Freedom - Philippines; Anti-guerilla operations against the NPA and the Moro Islamic Liberation Front

Commanders
- Current commander: MGen. Raul M Farnacio, PA
- Notable commanders: Bgen Isagani T Delos Santos AFP; BGen Romulo F Yap AFP; BGen Romeo B Tarrayo; BGen Rufo A De Veyra AFP; BGen Romeo Dominguez AFP; BGen Glenn Rabonza AFP; BGen Bonifacio Ramos AFP; BGen Rodrigo Maclang AFP

Insignia
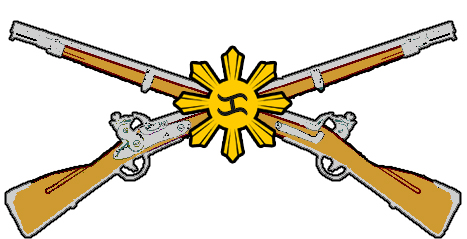
- Armed Forces Occupational Specialty Insignia

The 8th Infantry Division, Philippine Army, known officially as the Storm Trooper Division, is one of the Philippine Army's Infantry units in the Visayas and under the AFP Central Command, combating local communist insurgent units, and terrorists.

== History ==
The division was established on August 1, 1988, with headquarters at Camp General Vicente Lukban, Catbalogan, Samar. The local government soldiers and officers under the 8th Infantry Division of the Philippine Army was sending the combat operations in the Visayas region and the engagements of the Anti-Communist Operations and helping aided and supported of the Armed Forces of the Philippines, Philippine National Police and the CAFGU militia forces against the communist rebels of the Communist Party of the Philippines-New People's Army (CPP-NPA) and other local criminal elements.

During the Operation Enduring Freedom in the Philippines under the war on terrorism and the Islamic Insurgency in Mindanao, Southern Philippines. The local government troops of the Philippine Army 8th Infantry "Storm Trooper" Division was sending the clearing combat operations in Mindanao on Southern Philippines and the engagements of the Anti-Islamic and Counter-Terrorism operations and helping aided and supporting of the Armed Forces of the Philippines, Philippine National Police, the CAFGU militia forces and the U.S. Armed Forces to fought against the Islamic rebels and bandits of the Moro Islamic Liberation Front (MILF), Moro National Liberation Front (MNLF) and Abu Sayyaf Group (ASG) and other local criminal elements.

=== Mission ===
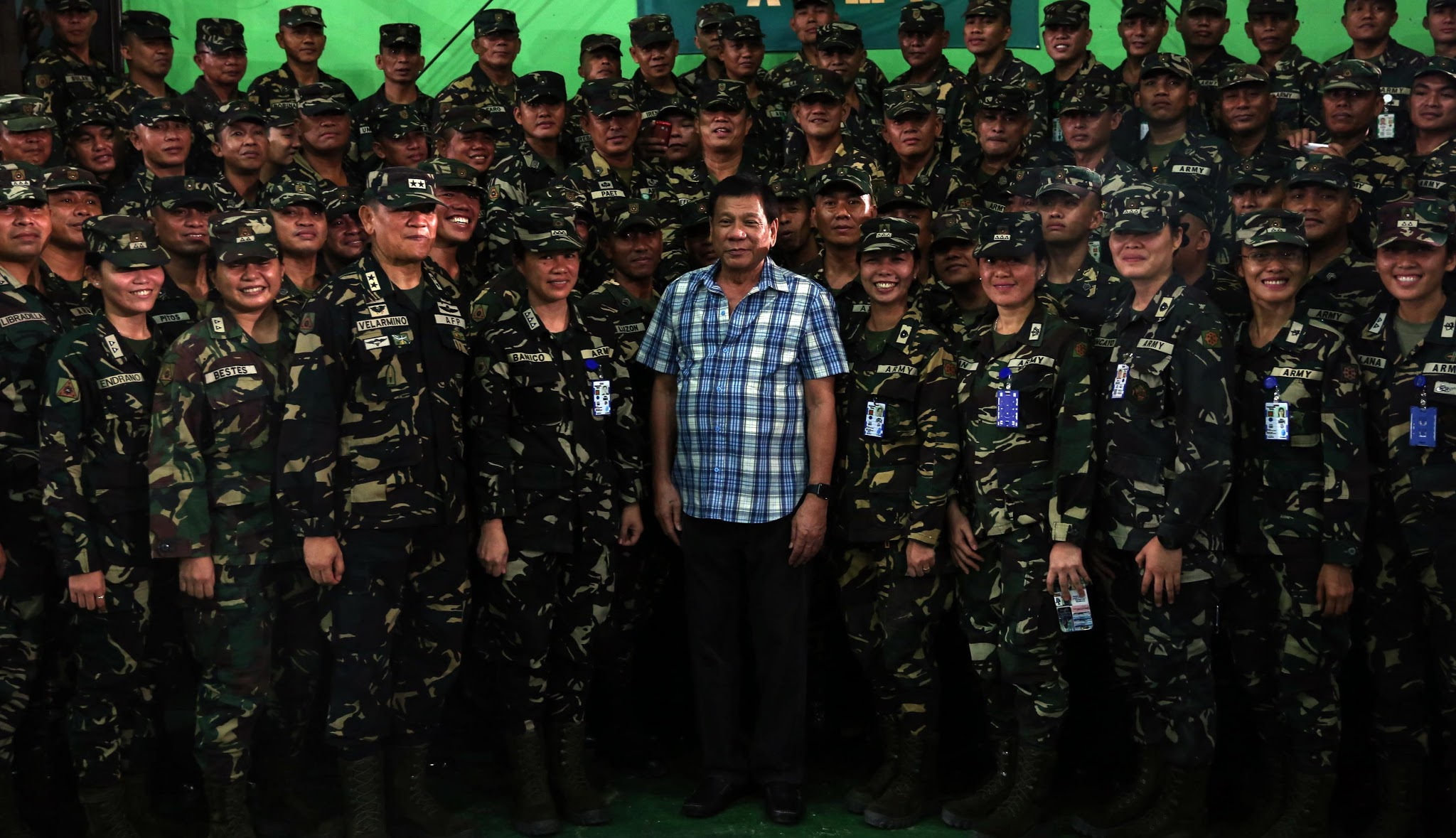
President Rodrigo Duterte poses with the 8th Infantry Division troops during his visit at Camp Vicente Lukban in Catbalogan, Samar on August 8, 2016.

The 8th Infantry (Storm Trooper) Division, Philippine Army often conducts Internal Security Operations (ISO) in their Area of Responsibility (AOR) to dismantle and destroy the remaining guerrilla fronts of the Local Communist Movement (LCM) in order to attain peace and stability conducive to sustainable development in assisting the Philippine government in its socio-economic development projects; and assists the Philippine National Police curb criminality in the Visayas Region.

=== Lineage of Commanding Officers ===
- BGen. Isagani T. Delos Santos, PA – (26 May 1986 – 31 March 1988)
- BGen. Federico E. Ruiz Jr., PA – (31 March 1988 – 27 March 1990)
- BGen. Romulo F. Yap, PA – (27 March 1990 – 10 January 1992)
- BGen. Ruperto A. Ambil, PA – (10 June 1992 – 12 April 1994)
- BGen. Danilo P. Olay, PA – (12 March 1994 – 15 March 1996)
- BGen. Romeo B. Tarrayo, PA – (4 April 1996 – 15 January 1998)
- MGen. Arturo B. Carrillo, PA – (15 January 1998 – 6 November 1999)
- MGen. Rufo A. De Veyra, PA – (6 November 1999 – 7 July 2001)
- MGen. Romeo B. Dominguez, PA – (6 July 2001 – 10 February 2003)
- MGen. Glenn J. Rabonza, PA – (10 February 2003 – 4 January 2005)
- BGen. Bonifacio B. Ramos, PA – (4 January 2005 – 10 February 2005)
- MGen. Jovito S. Palparan Jr., PA – (10 February 2005 – 25 August 2005)
- MGen. Bonifacio B. Ramos, PA – (25 August 2005 – 29 July 2006)
- BGen. Randy S. Dauz, PA – (29 July 2006 – 16 August 2006)
- MGen. Rodrigo F. Maclang, PA – (16 August 2006 – 15 January 2007)
- MGen. Armando L. Cunanan, PA – (15 January 2007 – 19 May 2008)
- BGen. Allan Ragpala, PA – (19 May 2008 – 4 June 2008)
- BGen. Arthur I. Tabaquero, PA – (4 June 2008 – 24 August 2010)
- MGen. Mario F. Chan, PA – (24 August 2010 – 8 April 2012)
- MGen. Gerardo T. Layug, PA – (8 April 2012 – September 2013)
- MGen. Jet B. Velarmino, PA – (13 September 2013 – 6 October 2016)
- MGen. Raul M. Farnacio, PA – (6 October 2016 – 5 June 2019)
- MGen. Pio Q. Diñoso III, PA – (5 June 2019 – 9 October 2021)
- BGen. Wilbur C. Mamawag, PA – (9 October 2021 – 6 December 2021) (acting)
- MGen. Edgardo Y. De Leon, PA – (6 December 2021 – 23 September 2022)
- BGen. Zosimo A. Oliveros, PA – (23 September 2022 – 21 October 2022) (acting)
- MGen. Camilo Z. Ligayo, PA – (21 October 2022 – Present)

== Current Units ==
The following are the Brigades under the 8th Infantry Division:

- 801st Infantry (Bantay at Gabay) Brigade
- 802nd Infantry (Peerless) Brigade
- 803rd Infantry (Peacemaker) Brigade

The following are the Battalions under the 8th Infantry Division:

- 14th Infantry (Avenger) Battalion
- 19th Infantry (Commando) Battalion
- 20th Infantry (We Lead) Battalion
- 31st Infantry (Charge) Battalion
- 34th Infantry (Reliable) Battalion
- 43rd Infantry (We Search) Battalion
- 46th Infantry (Peace Makers) Battalion
- 52nd Infantry (Catch 'Em) Battalion
- 63rd Infantry (Innovator) Battalion
- 78th Infantry (Warrior) Battalion
- 87th Infantry (Hinirang) Battalion
- 93rd Infantry (Bantay Kapayapaan) Battalion

The following are the Support Units under the 8th Infantry Division:

- Headquarters and Headquarters Service Battalion
- Service Support Battalion
- 8th Signal Battalion
- 8th Dental Detachment
- 8th Military Police Company
- 8th Post Engineer Detachment
- 8th Civil Military Operations (Dangpanan) Battalion
- 8th Division Training School
- 8th Field Artillery Battery (S)
- 8th Light Armor Company (S)

== Operations ==
- Government Arsenal
- Anti-guerrilla operations against the New People's Army
- Operation Enduring Freedom - Philippines.
- Office of the Civil Defense

== Incidents ==
=== Killing of Leonard Co, Sofronio Cortez, and Julius Borromeo ===
On November 15, 2010, Botanist Leonard Co, forester Sofronio Cortez, and farmer Julius Borromeo, were working on a biodiversity project under the auspices of the Energy Development Corporation when they were killed in an incident involving nine members of the 19th Infantry Battalion in the forests of Kananga, Leyte. Co, who was considered the foremost authority in ethnobotany in the Philippines at the time of his death, was examining a tree when the shooting began, while Cortez and Borromeo were helping him.

Members of the 19IB, a unit under the 8ID, claimed that Co's group had been caught in the crossfire in a fight between their unit and the New People's Army, but this claim was challenged by numerous investigating groups, including the Philippine National Police and the Philippines' Commission on Human Rights. The Department of Justice eventually filed charges against the soldiers involved, and the case is currently in the courts.

== External Entrusion ==
Philippine Army Reserve Command - all graduates of the Citizen Army Training and the Reserve Officer Training Corps are mandated to merge to as National Defense in case of a National Entrusion.
