= Leonard Co =

Filipino biologist (1953–2010)

- Born: Leonardo Legaspi Co; December 29, 1953; Manila, Philippines
- Died: November 15, 2010 (aged 56); Forests of Kananga, Leyte, Philippines
- Cause of death: Shot three times by members of 19th Infantry Battalion, Armed Forces of the Philippines
- Education: University of the Philippines Diliman (BS)
- Spouse: Glenda Flores (m. 1990)
- Children: 1
- Awards: Most Distinguished Award, 2nd Gawad Bayani ng Kalikasan (posthumous); Hugh Greenwood Environmental Award (posthumous)
- Scientific career
- Fields: Plant taxonomy, ethnobotany
- Workplaces: University of the Philippines Institute of Biology; Conservation International-Philippines; Philippine Native Plants Conservation Society
- Website: www.philippineplants.org

Leonardo Legaspi Co (December 29, 1953 in Manila – November 15, 2010 in Kananga, Leyte) was a Filipino botanist and plant taxonomist who was considered the "foremost authority in ethnobotany in the Philippines" during his lifetime.

== Education and early career ==
Co's education in Botany did not follow the usual track. He did not finish his bachelor's degree until 2008 because he was always too busy doing research out in the field. Dr. Perry Ong, director of the Institute of Biology at the University of the Philippines Diliman summed it up at Co's wake by saying "Leonard Co entered UP as botany freshman in the early 70s and never left". While practicing acupuncture he met his wife Glenda Flores, whom he married on June 12, 1990.

In 2008, with Co already informally considered one of the foremost experts in his field, University of the Philippines Diliman named him the last graduate of the BS degree in Botany; some time in the decades since Co's enrollment, the course had been merged with the bachelor's degree in Zoology to form the Biology program. This unorthodox academic path also earned Co another distinction in the annals of UP: Co submitted his book on the medicinal plants of the Cordilleras in lieu of a thesis, making him the only student to graduate from the BS Botany degree without submitting a thesis.

Co worked as a museum researcher at the University of the Philippines Institute of Biology, and as a senior botanist at the Conservation International-Philippines.

== Career ==
Leonard Co was the founding president of the Philippine Native Plants Conservation Society. He is credited for discovering eight new species of plants. Aside from these, two species of Philippine endemic plants have been named in his honor: the Mycaranthes leonardi orchid and the Rafflesia leonardi, a parasitic plant species of the genus Rafflesia endemic to the Philippines and known for bearing the third largest flower in the world.

Co curated a checklist called Digital Flora, an online guide that lists more than 10,000 species of plants that indigenous to the Philippines. Since Co's death, the list has been maintained by colleagues Julie Barcelona, Pieter Pelser, and Daniel Nickrent.

A year before his death, Co also documented the flora of the Bataan National Park, coming up with a catalog that lists 160 unique plant species, essential for guiding reforestation efforts on the 23,668-hectare park centered around Mount Natib.

Co organized Classroom Without Walls, a lecture tour conducted in Philippine forests to teach biodiversity.

Co was a University of the Philippines Biology professor and a consultant for the Energy Development Corporation. He was tasked the firm's former chairman by the firm's former chairperson Oscar Lopez to replant seeds in a geothermal power plant at Kananga, Leyte.

== Death ==
Co, forester Sofronio Cortez, and farmer Julius Borromeo, were working on a biodiversity project under the auspices of the Energy Development Corporation when they were killed in an incident involving nine members of the 19th Infantry Battalion of the Armed Forces of the Philippines' 8th Infantry Division in the forests of Kananga, Leyte, on November 15, 2010. He and the group were examining a tree when the shooting began, and three bullets hit Co; resulting in death within 20 minutes. He was 56.

Members of the army unit claimed that Co's group had been caught in the crossfire in a fight between their unit and the New People's Army, but this claim was challenged by numerous investigating groups, including the Philippine National Police and the Philippines' Commission on Human Rights. The Department of Justice eventually filed charges against the soldiers involved, and the case is currently in the courts, charging nine soldiers with reckless imprudence resulting in multiple homicide. The Co family's appeal to the DOJ to upgrade the charges to murder remains pending as of 2022.

== Burial and legacy ==
During his wake, Co was conferred the rare honor of having his coffin briefly displayed in front of the University of the Philippines Diliman's copy of the UP Oblation - the iconic symbol of the University of the Philippines.

In accordance to his wishes, a third of his ashes was scattered in the 16-hectare forest dynamics plot he built and worked on in Palanan, Isabela, up in the Sierra Madre Mountains. Another third was given to the UP Institute of Biology and scattered under one of UP's trees, to symbolize that Co would always be a part of the university. The last third of his ashes was given to his family.

On May 2, 2011, Co was posthumously conferred the National Academy of Science and Technology's Hugh Greenwood Environmental Award for his contribution in profiling forest biodiversity.

In 2022, Filipino illustrator Raxenne Maniquiz designed "Rafflesiaceae of the Philippines", a poster showing rare endemic plants in Philippine tropical forests, inspired by a map made by Co and his colleagues.

On Co's death anniversary on November 15, 2023, the Leonard Co Ethnobotanical Garden was inaugurated at the Northwestern University to honor Co's contribution to Philippine botany.

"Mga Rebolusyonaryo," a mural depicting Co, chemist Maria Orosa, and botanist Eduardo Quisumbing was unveiled at the Polytechnic University of the Philippines in 2024.

The Leonard Co Lecture Series was scheduled to be launched on November 21, 2025.

== Publications ==
- Philippine Botanical Treasures and the Legacy of Leonardo L. Co: November 19 and 20, 2011, Tambunting Hall, National Museum of the Philippines
