= 2011 in the Philippines =

- Decades: 1990s; 2000s; 2010s; 2020s
- See also: List of years in the Philippines; films (highest grossing); television

2011 in the Philippines details events of note that happened in the Philippines in the year 2011.

== Incumbents ==
Benigno S.
Aquino III

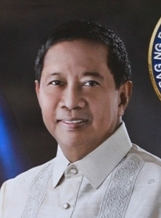
Jejomar C.
Binay Sr.

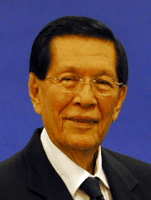
Juan Ponce F. Enrile

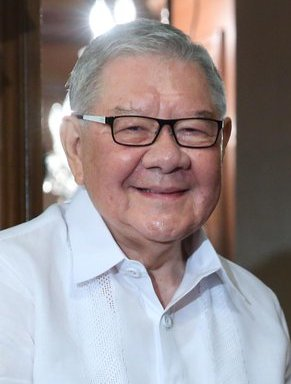
Feliciano R.
Belmonte Jr.

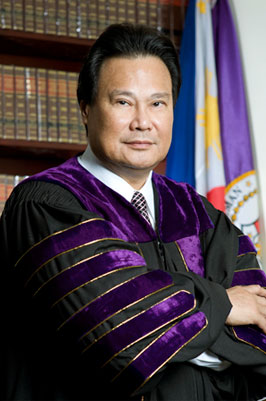
Renato
C. Corona

- President: Benigno Aquino III
- Vice President: Jejomar Binay
- Senate President: Juan Ponce Enrile
- House Speaker: Feliciano Belmonte, Jr.
- Chief Justice: Renato Corona
- Philippine Congress: 15th Congress of the Philippines

== Events ==
=== January ===
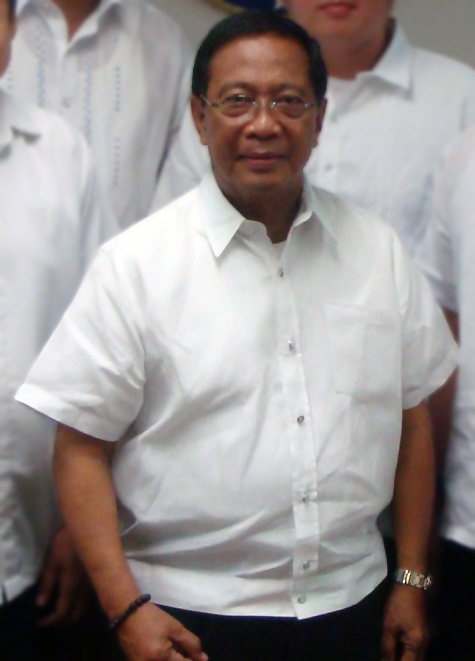
In light of the perceived resurgence of heinous crimes in the Philippines, Vice President Jejomar Binay called for the re-imposition of death penalty to give Filipinos a "discipline". The capital punishment in the country was abolished on June 24, 2006, by former President Gloria Macapagal Arroyo

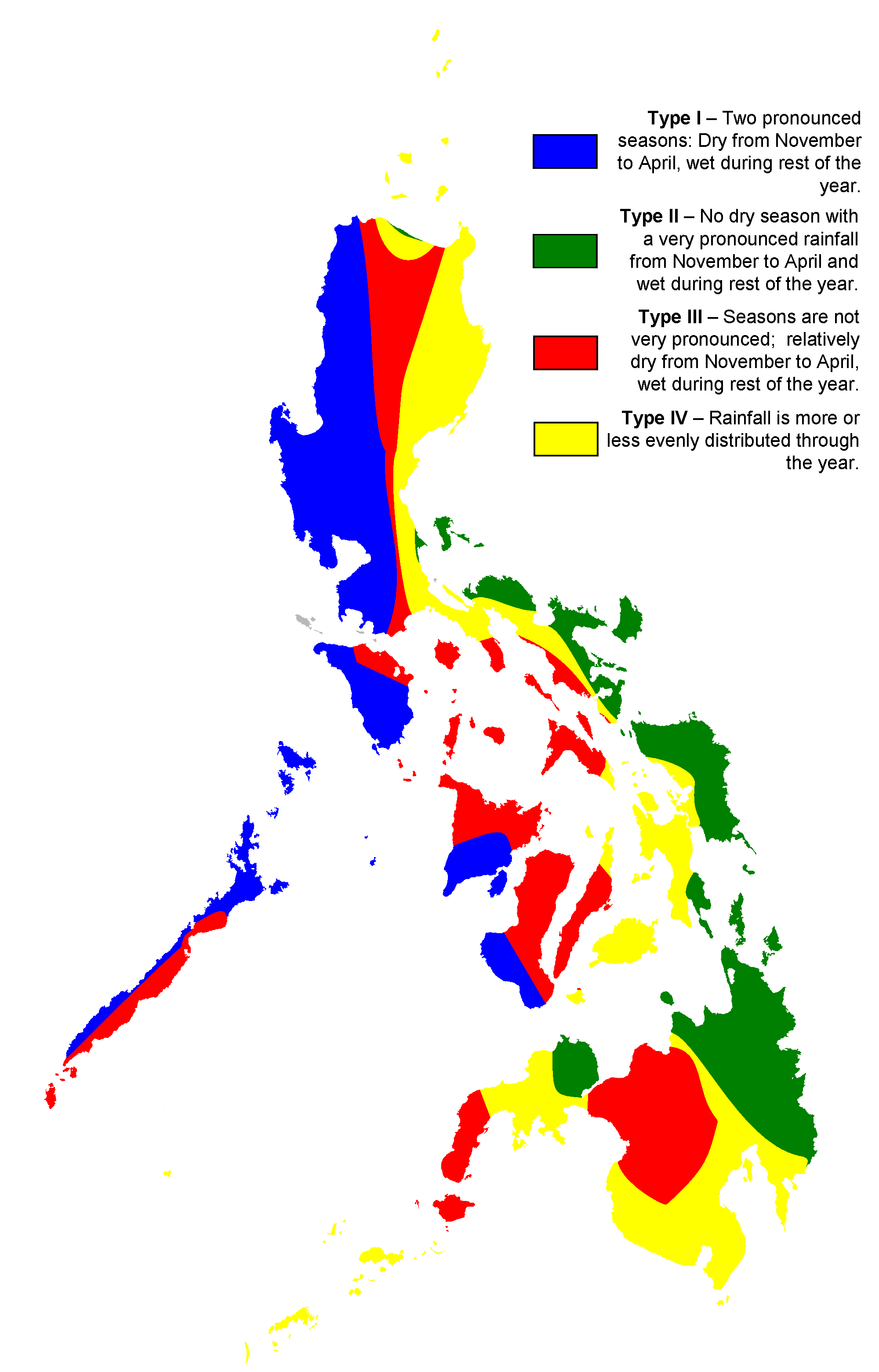
Much of the extent of the flooding is located on the areas of the map shaded green. The green-shaded part of the map receives year-round rainfall.

- January 5 – Heavy rains spawn flash floods and landslides that leave at least 10 people dead in several regions in Mindanao.
- January 18 – The Supreme Court (SC) denies Lauro Vizconde's appeal for reconsideration of its decision acquitting Hubert Webb and six other co-accused in the Vizconde massacre case.
- January 19 – Vice President Jejomar Binay joins calls for the re-imposition of death penalty in the country, in light of the perceived resurgence of heinous crimes.
- January 22 – Raymond Dominguez, suspected leader of a notorious carnapping syndicate, surrenders to police in Malolos City, Bulacan, after being tagged as the mastermind in three gruesome murders. The Dominguez brothers, Raymond and Roger, are allegedly involved in the killings of car dealers Venson Evangelista, Emerson Lozano, and the latter's driver, Ernani Sencil. On February 10, Roger Dominguez, suspected carjack ring leader and brother of Raymond Dominguez, is arrested after being flagged down for violating traffic rules in Timog Avenue, Quezon City. Like his brother, the older Dominguez is linked to the killings of Venzon Evangelista and Ernane Sencil in January.
- January 23 – The death toll from the 2010–2011 Philippine floods rises to 68 with 26 others still missing.
- January 24:
  - The country's first successful liver transplant is performed on a child, three-year-old Catherine Erica Buenaventura.
  - A 17-year-old student of the University of the Philippines, Danica Flores Magpantay, is named the 2011 Ford Models Supermodel of the World.
- January 27 – During a hearing at the Senate, former military budget officer Lt. Col George Rabusa bares a "pabaon" (send-off) system in the Armed Forces of the Philippines (AFP) and reveals how AFP chiefs allegedly raked in millions in illegal wealth. According to Rabusa, then outgoing AFP Chief of Staff Angelo Reyes allegedly received not less than P50 million as "pabaon" when he retired in 2001.

=== February ===
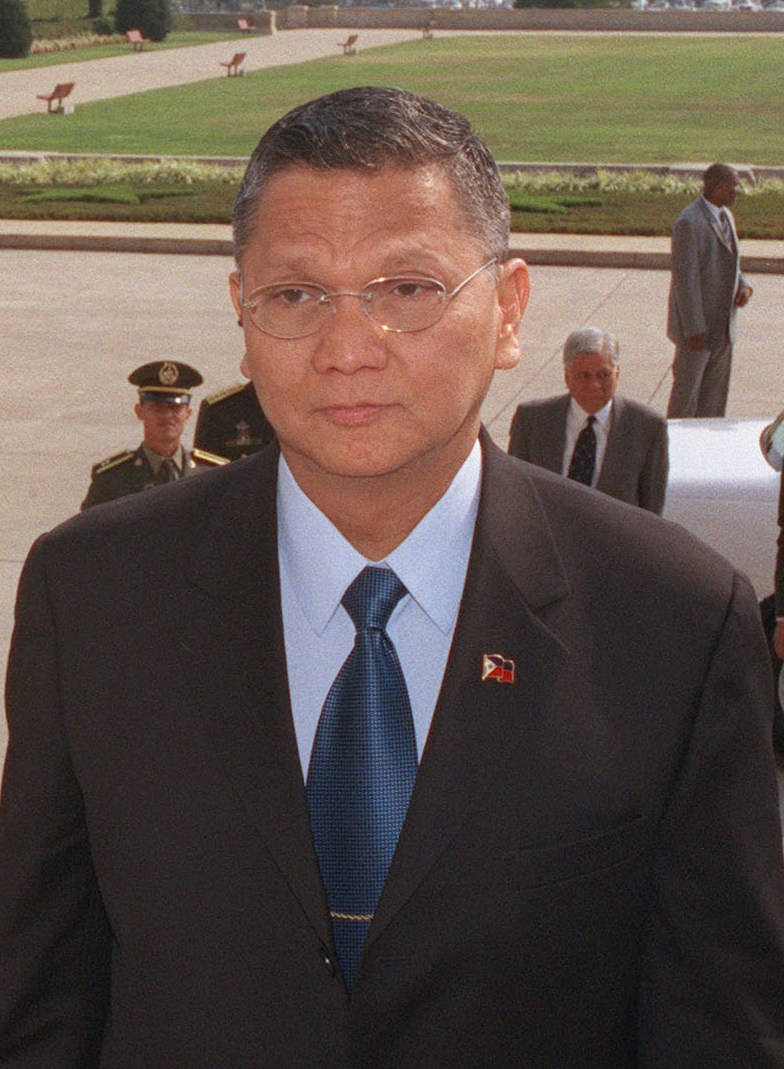
On February 8, 2011, a week after being accused of corruption while being AFP Chief of Staff, Angelo Reyes died due to a gunshot wound in an apparent suicide

- February 1 – Heidi Mendoza, a former auditor at the Commission on Audit (COA), reveals alleged irregularities and cover-ups in financial transactions involving the Armed Forces of the Philippines (AFP).
- February 3 – The Court of Appeals clears Senator Panfilo Lacson for the alleged murders of publicist Bubby Dacer and his driver Emmanuel Corbito.
- February 8 – Former Armed Forces of the Philippines chief of staff Angelo Reyes commits suicide amidst graft charges.
- February 15 –In a 7–6 decision, the Supreme Court ruled that the municipalities of Baybay in Leyte; Bogo in Cebu; Catbalogan in Samar; Tandag in Surigao del Sur; Lamitan in Basilan; Borongan in Eastern Samar; Tayabas in Quezon; Tabuk in Kalinga; Bayugan in Agusan del Sur; Batac in Ilocos Norte; Mati in Davao Oriental; Guihulngan in Negros Oriental; Cabadbaran in Agusan del Norte; El Salvador in Misamis Oriental; Carcar in Cebu; and Naga in Cebu can retain their city status. The court reaffirmed that their conversion to cityhood complied with all legal requirements.
- February 20 – Mount Bulusan suddenly erupts and sends a plume of ash 2 kilometers high.
- February 24 – Ilocos Sur Representative Ronald Singson, son of former Governor Chavit Singson, is sentenced to 1-year and 6 months of imprisonment in Hong Kong for possession of illegal drugs. Singson was caught by local authorities in July 2010 with 6.67 grams of pure cocaine and two tablets of the narcotic Nitrazepam at Hong Kong's international airport.

=== March ===
- March 1 – After being sentenced to over a year of imprisonment in Hong Kong, Ronald Singson resigns as the representative of the first district of Ilocos Sur.
- March 21 – The House of Representatives votes (212–46) to impeach Ombudsman Merceditas Gutierrez.
- March 24 – For failing to attend the inquiry into military corruption without a justifiable reason, former AFP comptroller Jacinto Ligot and his wife Erlinda are cited in contempt by the Senate and hold in Senate custody.
- March 26 – Senator Panfilo Lacson returns to the Philippines after more than a year away from the country.

=== April ===
- April 7 – A press conference in DOJ is held. BIR Commissioner Kim Henares filed a case against Rep. Mikey Arroyo, his wife Angela and Brazilian model-actress Daiana Menezes.
- April 22 – A landslide happens on Compostella Valley, where 13 miners are killed.

=== May ===
- May 8–9 – Typhoon Bebeng enters the Philippine area of Responsibility, and hits Bicol region where 20 people reported dead while 2 still missing.
- May 10 – The local government of Camarines Sur, declares the province under a state of calamity due to Typhoon Bebeng.

=== June ===
- June 29 – Philippine National Railways inaugurates Bicol Express rail service from Tutuban to Naga City. however, as of April 2015 services had still not been resumed.

=== August ===
- August 11 – Koko Pimentel is proclaimed as a new Senator of the Republic of the Philippines, replacing Migz Zubiri, who resigned on August 3.

=== September ===
- September 27 – Typhoon Pedring (international name Nesat) made its landfall in the provinces of Isabela and Aurora and affected Metro Manila. It caused heavy damage to infrastructure. 9 confirmed death, almost 2 billion pesos cost of damage was reported and at least 20 fishermen were reported missing.

=== November ===
- November 18 – Former Philippine President Gloria Macapagal Arroyo is arrested after a Pasay court issued a warrant of arrest against her, following the filing of a complaint for electoral sabotage by the Commission on Elections. The arrest warrant was served at a St. Luke's Medical Center at Taguig where Arroyo had been confined.

=== December ===
- December 9 – Arroyo is detained at the Veterans Memorial Medical Center in Quezon City after being transferred by ambulance.
- December 10 – A plane crash in Parañaque kills 14 people in a slum area.
- December 12 – 188 members of the House of Representatives sign an impeachment complaint against Chief Justice Renato Corona. Since only 95 signatures were necessary for the impeachment under the Constitution, the complaint is to be transmitted to the Senate for trial.
- December 14 – The Senate of the Philippines convenes as an impeachment court against Chief Justice Renato Corona.
- December 16–18 – Typhoon Sendong (international name Washi) crossed the Visayas and Mindanao region, leaving almost 1,500 people dead and more than thousands missing.

== Holidays ==
On December 11, 2009, Republic Act No. 9849 declared Eidul Adha as a regular holiday. Also amending Executive Order No. 292, also known as The Administrative Code of 1987, the following are regular and special days shall be observed. The EDSA Revolution Anniversary was proclaimed since 2002 as a special nonworking holiday. On February 25, 2004, Republic Act No. 9256 declared every August 21 as a special nonworking holiday to be known as Ninoy Aquino Day. Note that in the list, holidays in bold are "regular holidays" and those in italics are "nationwide special days".

- January 1 – **New Year's Day**
- February 25 – EDSA Revolution Anniversary
- April 9 – **Araw ng Kagitingan** (Day of Valor)
- April 21 – **Maundy Thursday**
- April 22 – **Good Friday**
- May 1 – **Labor Day**
- June 12 – **Independence Day**
- August 21 – Ninoy Aquino Day
- August 28 – **National Heroes Day**
- August 30 – **Eidul Fitr**
- November 1 – All Saints Day
- November 6 – **Eid al-Adha**
- November 30 – **Bonifacio Day**
- December 25 – **Christmas Day**
- December 30 – **Rizal Day**
- December 31 – Last Day of the Year

In addition, several other places observe local holidays, such as the foundation of their town. These are also "special days."

== Concerts ==
- January 8 – 1@11 – Gary Valenciano, Charice: SM Mall of Asia open grounds
- January 8 – Bone Thugs-n-Harmony live at SMX Convention Center
- January 11 – Mega 2011 – The Sharon Cuneta Birthday Concert: Araneta Coliseum
- January 15:
  - Big Fish Trance NRG live at A-Venue Events Hall
  - Bob Sinclar – live at World Trade Center, Pasay
  - The Kapamilya Ultimate Leading Men – Waterfront Hotel, Cebu City
- January 20 – LMFAO live at Republiq Superclub
- January 21 – China Crisis live at Eastwood Mall Open Park
- January 21–22 – The CompanY: Isang Pasasalamat – The Sanctuary of Word for the World Christian Fellowship, Makati
- January 22:
  - China Crisis live at Venice Piazza, McKinley Hill
  - Pambansang Musiklaban: Francis Magalona Tribute live at SM Mall of Asia open grounds
- January 25 – Lani Misalucha – The Nightingale Sings – Newport Performing Arts Theater
- February 4 – Janet Jackson Number Ones Up Close and Personal World Tour: PICC Plenary Hall
- February 5:
  - ASAP Sessionistas 20.11 – Araneta Coliseum
  - Kim Kyu Jong and Heo Young Saeng of SS501 live at PICC Forum 2
- February 9 – Trini Lopez – Waterfront Hotel, Cebu City
- February 10 – Trini Lopez – Araneta Coliseum
- February 11:
  - Jovit Baldivino Faithfully: Lahug, Cebu City
  - Love Rocks: feat. Stephen Bishop, Dan Hill and Yvonne Elliman – Araneta Coliseum
- February 11–12 – And I Love Her – Jericho Rosales and Gabriel Valenciano: Teatrino, Promande, Greenhills
- February 12:
  - A Night with Jose Mari Chan – Island Cove Hotel and Leisure Park, Kawit, Cavite
  - Deftones: Diamond Eyes Tour live at World Trade Center, Pasay
  - Fra Lippo Lippi live at University of Baguio
  - i Valentine U – Ogie Alcasid, Pops Fernandez and Regine Velasquez: Crowne Plaza Galleria Manila
  - What Love Is – Martin Nievera & Sarah Geronimo: Araneta Coliseum
- February 12–13 – The Greatest Love Songs of our Time: Kuh Ledesma and the Hitmakers live at PICC Plenary Hall
- February 14:
  - Fra Lippo Lippi live at NBC Tent
  - My Beautiful Girls – Christian Bautista, Venus Raj, Krista Kleiner and Wendy Tabusalla with Resorts World Manila Dancers and Manila Philharmonic Orchestra: Newport Performing Arts Theater in Resorts World Manila
  - Piolo Meets The Maestro – Piolo Pascual, Ryan Cayabyab, Yeng Constantino and Sitti Navarro: PICC Plenary Hall
- February 15 – Heart at Tux – The Tux: Music Museum
- February 18:
  - Neocolours The Reunion: Eastwood Mall
  - Voizes in the Rain – Voiz Boyz and The Rainmakers: Music Museum
- February 18–19 – Chippendales live at Newport Performing Arts Theater
- February 19 – Taylor Swift live at the Araneta Coliseum
- February 20 – Yellowcard live at A-Venue Hall Makati
- February 26:
  - Jovit Baldivino Faithfully: Music Museum
  - Park Mi Kyung live at Newport Performing Arts Theater
  - Super Junior: Super Show 3 live at Araneta Coliseum
- March 1 – Sugarfree's Farewell Concert: Eastwood Mall
- March 2 – Starry Starry Night with Don McLean: Araneta Coliseum
- March 4 – Opera Belles Live in Concert: Eastwood Mall Open Park
- March 9:
  - Stone Temple Pilots live 8:00 pm at Araneta Coliseum
  - Anberlin live at A-Venue Hall Makati
- March 11 – Opera Belles Live in Concert: Venice Piazza at McKinley Hill
- March 12:
  - Planetshakers live at Philsports Arena
  - The Whitest Boy Alive live at Republiq, Resorts World Manila
- March 29 – David Pomeranz and Lea Salonga live at Resorts World Manila
- April 1 – P*Pop Explosion feat. Pop Girls, XLR8 and RPM live at the Aliw Theater
- April 6 – Good Charlotte live at Glorietta Mall, Makati
- April 7 – Bruno Mars live at Araneta Coliseum
- April 14 – Balikbayani feat. Gary Valenciano, Ogie Alcasid, Lea Salonga etc. live at the Araneta Coliseum
- April 15 – Wency Cornejo: Here and Now – feat. After Image and Cookie Chua live at Promenade, Greenhills, San Juan City
- April 16 – The Script live at the Araneta Coliseum
- April 26 – Basil Valdez and Zsa Zsa Padilla live at the Araneta Coliseum
- April 28 – 2AM live at Newport Plaza, Resorts World, Manila
- April 29 – 2AM live at Venice Piazza, McKinley Hall
- April 30:
  - 2AM live at Eastwood Mall Open Park
  - PULP Summerslam XI live at Amoranto Stadium
  - Switchfoot Live at Philsports Arena
- May 1 – Nervecell live at Nuvo Parking Lot Lahug, Cebu City
- May 6–7 – My One and Only feat. Kuh Ledesma, Isabella and Jon Santos live at the Music Museum
- May 7:
  - Jennylyn Mercado Coming from the Rain live at Zirkoh, Timog Avenue, Quezon City
  - Lee DeWyze live at Venice Piazza, McKinley Hall
- May 8 – Lee DeWyze live at Eastwood Mall Open Park
- May 10:
  - Justin Bieber My World Tour live at SM Mall of Asia Open Grounds
  - Mr. Big live at the Araneta Coliseum
- May 12 – Air Supply live at the Aliw Theater
- May 13 – Rock N' Roll Era feat. Parokya ni Edgar, Kamikazee and Rivermaya live at Metro Bar
- May 14 – John Lapus – Sweet @ 18 live at Music Museum
- May 16 – Pulp Unleashed Present: Asking Alexandria live at Amoranto Theater, Quezon City
- May 22 – Kenny Loggins live at SMX Convention Center
- May 23:
  - Kenny G live at the PICC Plenary Hall
  - Maroon 5 live at SMX Convention Center
- May 24 – Pops Fernandez in Fashion live at Newport Performing Arts Theater
- June 2 – Hillsong United Aftermath Tour live at Araneta Coliseum
- June 4:
  - 2NE1 live at the Araneta Coliseum
  - Tsai Chin Hu and Chang Hsiu Ching live at Newport Performing Arts Theater in Resorts World Manila
- June 14 – Pops Fernandez in Fashion live at Newport Performing Arts Theater in Resorts World Manila
- June 17 – Miley Cyrus Corazon Gitano Tour live at SM Mall of Asia open grounds
- June 18 – Wolfgang live at Metropolitan Theater
- June 24–25 – David Choi live at the Music Museum
- June 24–26 and July 1–2 – The Music of Andrew Lloyd Webber live at CCP Main Theater
- June 24–July 10 – Aida the Music live at Carlos P. Romulo Theater, RCBC Plaza, Makati
- June 28 – Ryan Cayabyab and Friends live at Newport Performing Arts Theater in Resorts World Manila
- June 29 – RJ Bistro Presents: Sing-A-Long Doo Wop Night live at Dusit Thani Hotel, Makati
- July 1 – Vice Ganda: Todo Sample sa Araneta live at Araneta Coliseum
- July 3 – Bocaue Fluvial Festival
- July 4 – Bobby Kimball live at SMX Convention Center
- July 5 – Kylie Minogue Aphrodite Tour live at Araneta Coliseum
- July 7 – Marilyn McCoo and Billy Davis, Jr. live at Araneta Coliseum
- July 15 – Angeline Quinto: Patuloy Ang Mangarap live at SM North Edsa Skydome
- July 16 & 23 – Martin Nievera Tribute live at Newport Performing Arts Theater in Resorts World Manila
- July 18 – David Archuleta live at the Araneta Coliseum
- July 23 – The CompanY and Jose Mari Chan: It's Complicated live at SMX Convention Center
- July 28 – Incubus: If Not Now, When? World Tour – Philippine Leg Concert live at Araneta Coliseum
- July 29 – Thirty Seconds to Mars live at Trinoma Mall/Mindanao Parking
- August 5:
  - Rakenroll Jamming with Yeng Constantino feat. Tutti Caringal, Gloc 9, Raymund Marasigan and Sam Milby live at the Aliw Theater
  - Timeless – Golden 60's Hits feat. Chip Hawkes, RJ Jacinto & Gerry and the Pacemakers live at Waterfront Hotel, Lahug, Cebu City
- August 6 – Timeless – Golden 60's Hits feat. Chip Hawkes, RJ Jacinto & Gerry and the Pacemakers live at PICC Plenary Hall, Pasay
- August 10 – Korn live at the Araneta Coliseum
- August 13 – Rachelle Ann Go live at Eastwood Mall Open Park
- August 14 – Rachelle Ann Go live at Venice Piazza, McKinley Hall
- August 19–26 – Solenn Heussaff On Stage live at Teatrino
- August 20 – Psor Rocks feat. Cueshe, Slapshock, General Luna, Kenyo, etc. live at Bay Park Service Road, Roxas Boulevard, Pasay
- August 23 – Ogie Alcasid – Celebration: A Birthday Concert live at Newport Performing Arts Theater in Resorts World Manila
- August 24 – Ed Kowalczyk live at the Araneta Coliseum
- August 25 – Kim Hyun Joong "Break Down" live at Trinoma Activity Center
- August 27 – Erik Bana live at the Meralco Theater
- September 2–18: In The Heights (Musical) live at Carlos P. Romulo Teater RCBC Plaza, Makati
- September 7 – All-4-One and Color Me Badd live at the Araneta Coliseum
- September 9:
  - All-4-One and Color Me Badd live at Waterfront Hotel, Lahug, Cebu City
  - China Crisis and Ex-Simple Minds live at SMX Convention Center
- September 16:
  - In The Company of Side A live at Newport Performing Arts Theater in Resorts World Manila
  - Rock Rizal 2011 feat. Gloc 9, Sandwich, Ebe Dancel, Peryodiko, Jett Pangan and Radioactive Sago Project live at SM Mall of Asia
  - Sitti Ang Aking Awitin live at Music Museum
- September 16 & 17 – Martin Nievera Tribute live at Newport Performing Arts Theater in Resorts World Manila
- September 20 & 21 – American Idol Live Tour at the Araneta Coliseum
- September 22:
  - All Time Low live at the Araneta Coliseum
  - Zia Quizon: Simple Girl live at Teatrino, Greenhills
- September 23–25 – Mickey's Music Festival live at Waterfront Hotel, Lahug, Cebu City
- September 27 – Broadway Showstoppers feat. Leo Valdez, Joanna Ampil, Ima Castro, Opera Belles and Primo live at Newport Performing Arts Theater in Resorts World Manila
- September 29 – Westlife – Gravity World Tour live at the Araneta Coliseum
- September 30:
  - The Wild Swans live at Waterfront Hotel, Lahug, Cebu City
  - Toni Gonzaga: Toni @ 10 – The 10th Anniversary Celebration live at the Araneta Coliseum
- October 1 – The Wild Swans live at One Esplanade, SM Mall of Asia
- October 5–9 – Mickey's Music Festival live at the Araneta Coliseum
- October 9 – Lenka live at A-Venue, Makati
- October 10 – The Human League, Howard Jones and Belinda Carlisle live at the Araneta Coliseum
- October 14 – Tanduay Rhum Rockfest Year 5 live at SM Mall of Asia Open Grounds
- October 16:
  - Andrea Corr live at the Araneta Coliseum
  - Sum 41 live at A-Venue, Makati
- October 18 – Andrea Corr live at Waterfront Hotel, Lahug, Cebu City
- October 18–23 – Stomp! live at Tanghalang Nicanor Abelardo, CCP, Pasay
- October 21 – Tahiti 80 live at 6/F The Tents at Alphaland Southgate
- October 25:
  - Hitman Returns – David Foster & Friends feat. Philip Bailey, Ashanti, Russell Watson, Michael Bolton and Charice live at the Araneta Coliseum
- The Black Eyed Peas live at SM Mall of Asia Open Grounds
- October 26 – Owl City live at NBC Tent
- October 30 – Jason Mraz live at the Araneta Coliseum
- November 11 – Go West live at Eastwood Mall Open Park
- November 12 – Go West live at Venice Piazza, McKinley Hill
- November 19:
  - Children of Bodom live at the Amoranto Stadium
  - Greyson Chance live at Eastwood Mall Open Park
- November 20 – Greyson Chance live at Venice Piazza, McKinley Hill
- November 26 – BBS featuring Kean Cipriano live at the Aliw Theater
- November 30 – Pitbull live at the Araneta Coliseum
- December 7 – Train live at the Araneta Coliseum
- December 8:
  - Mike Posner live at Trinoma Mall, Quezon City
  - Y! Rocks Supports OPM feat. Wolfgang, Karl Roy, Urbandub, Wilabaliw, The Dawn, Hijo, Ang Bandang Shirley, Pedicab, The Jerks, Pupil, Taken by Cars, Paramita, Stonefree, Razorback, True Faith, Sandwich, Callalily, 6cyclemind, Tanya Markova, Not So Fast, SinoSikat, General Luna, Somedaydream, Mobbstarr, Badburn, Hilera, Gloc-9, Parokya ni Edgar, Archipelago and Franco live at SM Mall of Asia Open Grounds
  - Y! Rocks Supports OPM feat. Rico Blanco, Never the Strangers and Greyhoundz live at SM City Cebu
  - Y! Rocks Supports OPM feat. Ebe Dancel, Salamin and Ney live at SM City Davao
- December 9:
  - Mike Posner live at Glorietta Mall, Makati
  - Richard Marx live at the Araneta Coliseum
- December 10 – Mike Posner live at Alabang Town Center

== Films ==
List of top films at the Philippine Box-Office chart published by Box Office Mojo.

#	Date	Film	Gross
1	January 9, 2011		
2	January 16, 2011		
3	January 23, 2011	The Green Hornet	$626,260
4	January 30, 2011	The Green Hornet	$283,945
5	February 6, 2011	Bulong	$763,790
6	February 13, 2011	My Valentine Girls	$399,950
7	February 20, 2011	Just Go With It	$308,770
8	February 27, 2011	I Am Number Four	$587,026
9	March 6, 2011		
10	March 13, 2011	The Adjustment Bureau	$146,192
11	March 20, 2011	Battle: Los Angeles	$404,751
12	March 27, 2011	Catch Me, I'm in Love	$1,227,262
13	April 3, 2011	Catch Me, I'm in Love	$599,631
14	April 10, 2011	Rio	$599,631
15	April 17, 2011	Rio	$458,103
16	April 24, 2011	Pak! Pak! My Dr. Kwak!	$507,380
17	May 1, 2011	Thor	$1,397,065
18	May 8, 2011	Fast Five	$1,091,224
19	May 15, 2011	In The Name of Love	$1,098,179
20	May 22, 2011	Pirates of the Caribbean: On Stranger Tides	$1,463,948
21	May 29, 2011	Kung Fu Panda 2	$1,958,888
22	June 5, 2011	X-Men: First Class	$1,645,650
23	June 12, 2011	X-Men: First Class	$893,119
24	June 19, 2011	Green Lantern	$1,651,953
25	June 26, 2011	Green Lantern	$664,828
26	July 3, 2011	Transformers: Dark of the Moon	$4,869,897
27	July 10, 2011	Transformers: Dark of the Moon	$2,325,399
28	July 17, 2011	Harry Potter and the Deathly Hallows – Part 2	$3,590,647
29	July 24, 2011	Harry Potter and the Deathly Hallows – Part 2	$1,635,099
30	July 31, 2011	Captain America: The First Avenger	$2,103,025

Top-Grossing Filipino films for 2011

#	Film	Gross
1	Catch Me, I'm in Love	P120.21M
2	In The Name of Love	P117.2M
3	Pak! Pak! My Dr. Kwak!	P72.31M
4	Bulong My Valentine Girls	P67.27M
5	Temptation Island	P60M
6	Who's That Girl	P58.31M
7	Forever and a Day	P44.73M

Released	Title	Directed by	Cast	Film Outfit	Genre
February 2, 2011	Bulong	Chito S. Roño	Vhong Navarro, Angelica Panganiban	Star Cinema	Horror, Comedy
February 7, 2011	Ikaw Ang Pag-ibig	Marilou Diaz-Abaya	Jomari Yllana, Ina Feleo, Eddie Garcia, Marvin Agustin, Jaime Fabregas	Star Cinema, Unitel Productions	Drama
February 9, 2011	My Valentine Girls	Dominic Zapata, Andoy Ranay, Chris Martinez	Richard Gutierrez, Solenn Heussaff, Lovi Poe, Eugene Domingo, Rhian Ramos, Jillian Ward	GMA Films	romantic comedy
March 2, 2011	Who's That Girl	Wenn V. Deramas	Anne Curtis, Luis Manzano, Eugene Domingo	Viva Films	Romantic comedy
March 23, 2011	Catch Me, I'm in Love	Mae Cruz	Gerald Anderson, Sarah Geronimo, Matteo Guidicelli	Star Cinema and VIVA Films	Romantic comedy
April 23, 2011	Pak! Pak! My Dr. Kwak!	Tony Y Reyes	Vic Sotto, Bea Alonzo, Pokwang, Zaijan Jaranilla, Xyriel Manabat	Star Cinema & MZet Productions	Comedy
May 4, 2011	Tumbok	Topel Lee	Cristine Reyes, Carlo Aquino	Viva Films	Horror
May 11, 2011	In the Name of Love	Olivia Lamasan	Aga Muhlach, Angel Locsin	Star Cinema	Romance, Drama
June 15, 2011	Forever and a Day	Cathy Garcia-Molina	Sam Milby, KC Concepcion	Star Cinema	Romance
July 6, 2011	Temptation Island	Chris Martinez	Marian Rivera, Heart Evangelista, Lovi Poe, Solenn Heussaff, Rufa Mae Quinto, John Lapus	Regal Films & GMA Films	Comedy
July 13, 2011	The Adventures of Pureza	Soxie H. Topacio	Melai Cantiveros, Jason Francisco	Star Cinema & SineScreen	Comedy

== Sports ==
- February 4 – Basketball: The Talk 'N Text Tropang Texters and the San Miguel Beermen will play for the 101st championship contested by the league. Talk 'N Text won the series, 4–2, capturing their 3rd title.
- February 19 – Boxing: Nonito Donaire defeats Fernando Montiel by technical knockout in the second round to unify the WBO and WBC bantamweight titles. Donaire started the fight strong by controlling most of the first round, landing a left hook that briefly stunned Montiel. In the second round, Donaire started landing a few combinations before finishing Montiel with a solid hook.
- May 7 – Boxing: Manny Pacquiao defeats Shane Mosley by unanimous decision to retain his WBO welterweight title.
- May 8 – Basketball: The Talk 'N Text Tropang Texters and the Barangay Ginebra Kings will play for the 102nd championship contested by the league. Talk 'N Text won the series, 4–2, capturing their 4th title.
- July 4 – Football: After a Draw in away leg and a Win in home leg, Philippine Football Team wins over Sri Lanka in the first round of Asian qualifiers for the 2014 FIFA World Cup. This is the country's first win in the World Cup Qualifiers.
- July 23–24 – Basketball: On this days Smart Ultimate All Star launched the very rare moment of the history of basketball. Here the PBA All-Star Team and Smart Gilas faced the Smart All-Star (the team of NBA).
- July 28 – Football: The Philippine Football Team was eliminated in the 2014 FIFA World Cup qualifiers after losing both the home and away leg against Kuwait.
- August 21 – Basketball: The Petron Blaze Boosters defeated the Talk 'N Text Tropang Texters in seven games to win their 19th Philippine Basketball Association (PBA) championship and prevented Talk 'N Text from winning the Grand Slam. Arwind Santos was named the Finals MVP.
- September 15–25 – Basketball: The Philippine Basketball Team participated in the 2011 FIBA Asia Championship, held at Wuhan, China. The team made impressive performance, winning 7 games and losing 3, one in the preliminary round (against China), the second one in semi-finals (against Jordan), and the Bronze Medal match (against Korea), putting them into fourth place. Though it missed their chance to enter the Olympic Basketball Tournament, the team achieved the country's highest in 24 years.
- October 1 — Basketball: The Ateneo Blue Eagles wins series 2-0 has beaten the FEU Tamaraws, 82–69, to win their fourth straight in UAAP championships.
- October 4 – Football: Philippine Football Team placed Second in 2011 Long Teng Cup at Taiwan.
- October 22 – Boxing: Nonito Donaire wins a one-sided decision over Omar Andres Narvaez.
- October 26 – Basketball: The San Beda Red Lions wins series 2-0 has beaten the San Sebastian Stags, 57–55, to win their second straight in NCAA championships.
- November 11–22 – Multi Sport Event: The Philippine Team participated in the 26th Southeast Asian Games held in Jakarta and Palembang, Indonesia. Despite huge delegation and big expectations of grabbing 70 gold medals, the Philippines only got 36 gold out of 169 medals, placing them to sixth place.
- November 13 – Boxing: Pacquiao won the fight over Marquez by a majority decision in Las Vegas. The decision was controversial. He retained his WBO welterweight title.

== Television ==
- September 12 – Shamcey Supsup, Bb. Pilipinas-Universe 2011, was the 3rd Runner-up at Miss Universe 2011 held at São Paulo, Brazil.
- November 6 – Gwendoline Ruais, Miss World-Philippines 2011, was the 1st Runner-up at Miss World 2011 held at London, United Kingdom.
- November 7 – Diane Necio, Bb. Pilipinas International 2011, was placed in Top 15 at Miss International 2011 held at China.
- December 3 – Athena Mae Imperial, Miss Philippines-Earth 2011, was crowned Miss Water at Miss Earth 2011 held at Quezon City.

== Deaths ==
- January 1 – Reynaldo Dagsa, Filipino politician, assassinated
- January 5 – Agustin Perdices, 76, Filipino politician, Governor of Negros Oriental (since 2010), stomach cancer. (b. 1935)
- January 24 – Gerry Ortega, 47, RMN radio commentator and human activist (b. 1963)
- February 2 – Federico Aguilar Alcuaz, painter, National Artist-designee (b. 1932)
- February 8 – Angelo Reyes, 65, retired Armed Forces Chief of Staff and Secretary of National Defense, suicide (b. 1945)
- March 3 – Paquito Diaz, 73, actor and movie director (b. 1937)
- March 7 – Rodrigo Salud, 72, commissioner of the PBA from 1988 to 1992 (b. 1938)
- March 9 – Armando Goyena, 88, actor, pulmonary embolism (b. 1922)
- March 20 – John Apacible, 38, model-turned actor, gunshot wound (b. 1973)
- April 17 – AJ Perez, 18, actor, vehicular accident (b. 1993)
- May 13 – Chit Estella, 54, Journalist of Inquirer and Manila Times, car crash (b. 1956)
- May 15 – Maico Buncio, 22, motorcycle racer, racing accident. (b. 1988)
- May 23 – Alejandro Roces, 86, writer and government official, Secretary of Education (1961–1965) (b. 1921)
- May 27 – Regalado Maambong, 72, jurist, senatorial candidate for the 2010 election, member of 1986 Constitutional Commission. (b. 1938)
- May 31 – Conrado Estrella, Sr., 93, Filipino politician, Governor of Pangasinan (1954–1963), Agrarian Reform Minister (1978–1986).
- June 26 – Jose Mari Avellana, 70, former stage actor and director/son of Lamberto Avellana, brain aneurysm (b. 1941)
- July 7 – Rizalino Navarro, 72, business executive, Secretary of Trade and Industry (1992–1996), heart attack (b. 1938)
- July 8 – Miguel Gatan Purugganan, 79, Roman Catholic prelate, Bishop of Ilagan (1974–1999). (b. 1942)
- July 26 – Josephine C. Reyes, 82, educator, President of Far Eastern University (1985–1989) (b. 1929)
- July 28 – Agapito Lozada, 72, Olympic swimmer (b. 1939)
- August 3 – Antonio Diaz, 83, politician, Representative from Zambales (1969–1972, 1992–2001, 2004–2011) (b. 1928)
- August 6 – Fe del Mundo, 99, pediatrician, National Scientist of the Philippines, heart attack. (b. 1911)
- August 19 – Kerima Polotan Tuvera, 85, author and journalist. (b. 1925)
- August 21 – Edith Tiempo, 92, author, poet and novelist, National Artist of the Philippines, heart attack. (b. 1919)
- September 21 – Ben Feleo, 85, film director. (b. 1925–1926)
- October 12 – Augustus Cezar, Polytechnic University of the Philippines, Vice President for Administration, gunshot wound.
- October 29 – Ram Revilla, 23, Filipino actor, half brother of Sen. Ramon "Bong" Revilla Jr. and son of former actor and Sen. Ramon Revilla Sr. (b. 1989)
- November 2 – Boots Plata, Filipino movie director and writer. (b. 1943)
- November 11 – Lito Calzado, 65, former TV director/choreographer and father of actress Iza Calzado, liver cancer (b. 1946)
- November 22 – Alberto Reynoso, 71, Philippine Basketball Association player (b. 1940)
- December 1 – Purificacion Quisumbing, 77, Chairperson, Commission on Human Rights (2002–2008), multiple myeloma. (b. 1934)
- December 5 – RJ (Roseo José) Rosales, 37, Filipino-Australian singer and stage actor (b. 1974)
- December 15 – William Claver, 75, Filipino human rights lawyer, Congressman from Kalinga-Apayao (1987–1992).
- December 15 – Nimfa C. Vilches, Filipino judge (b. 1956)
- December 29 – Tyron Perez, 26, Filipino actor, TV host, model, former StarStruck Alumni Batch 1 (b. 1985)
