= Mount Danglay =

Hill in the Philippines

- Location within Philippines

Highest point
- Coordinates: 11°18′00″N 125°00′00″E

Geography
- Location: Basey, Philippines

Mount Danglay is a hill in the southern part of Samar Island of the Philippines. It is located in San Pedro in Santa Rita and May-it in Basey. The hill is located approximately 568.5 kilometres (353.2 mi) southeast from Manila. Its terrain is estimated to be 38 meters or 125 feet above sea level.
