= Sohoton =

Sohoton is a place name meaning "narrow opening" in the Visayan languages of the Philippines. It can refer to:

- Sohoton Caves and Natural Bridge Park, a protected natural area in Samar
- Sohoton Cove, on Bucas Grande island, Surigao del Norte in the Philippines
- Sohoton, a barangay of Badian, Cebu
