= Basey =

Municipality in Samar, Philippines

- Municipality
- Municipality of Basey
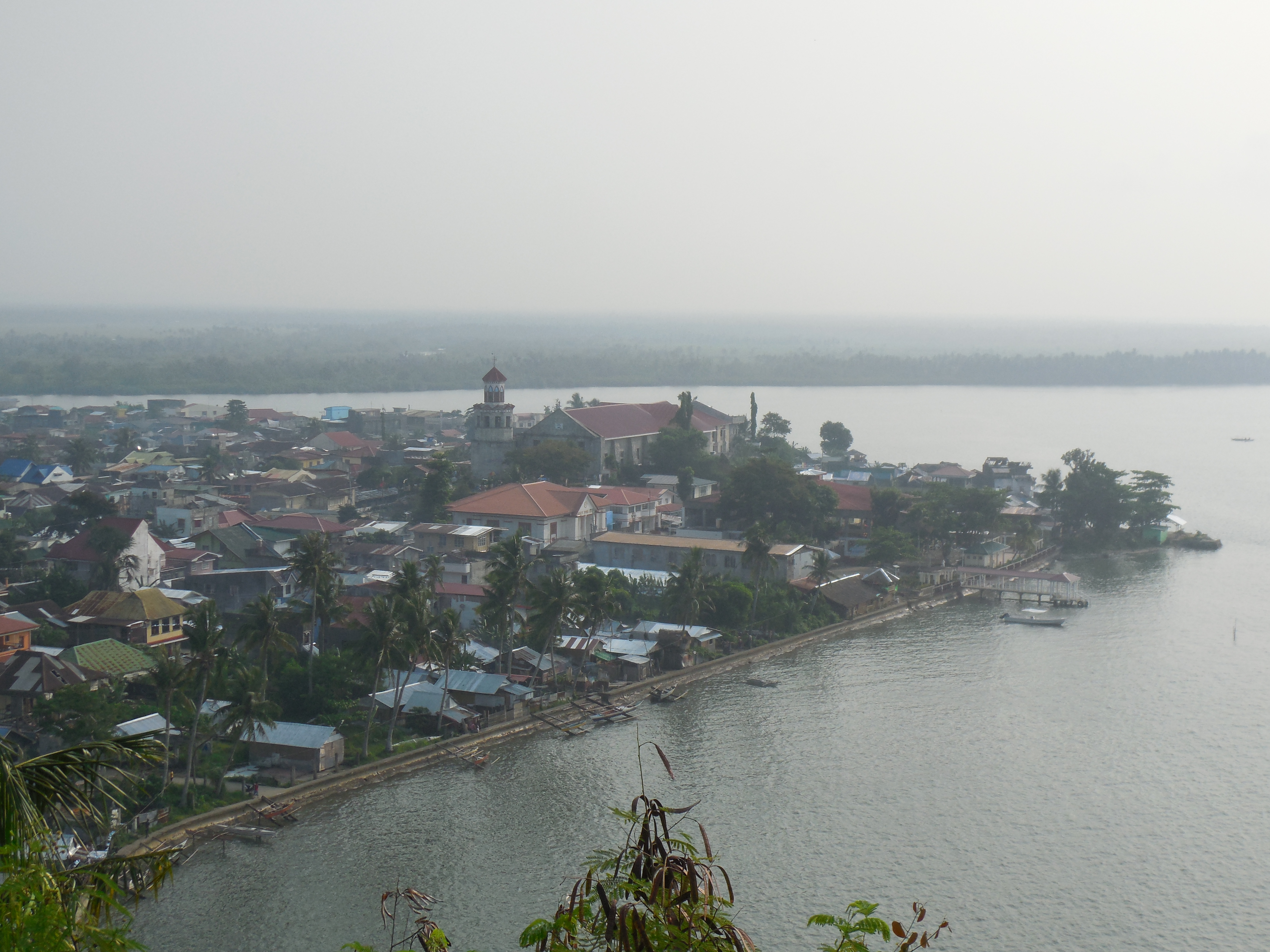
- Aerial view from Guintolian Hill

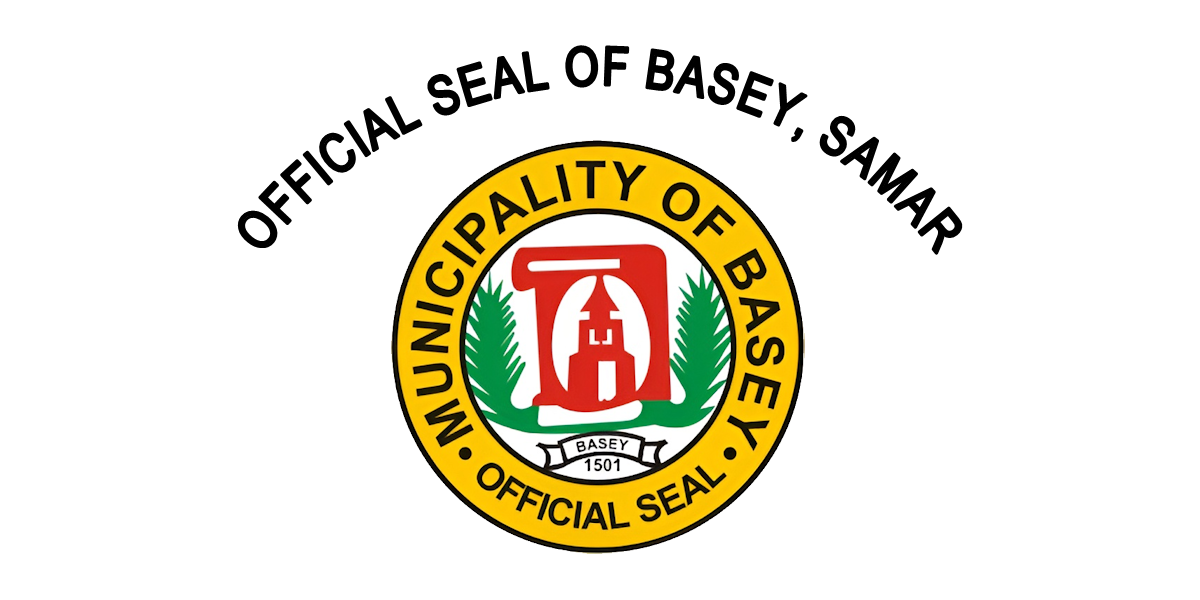
- Flag Seal

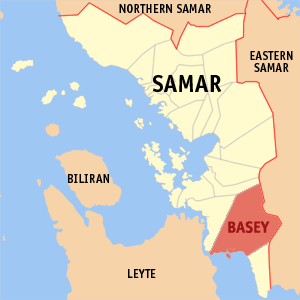
- Map of Samar with Basey highlighted
- Interactive map of Basey
- Location within the Philippines
- Coordinates: 11°16′54″N 125°04′06″E
- Country: Philippines
- Region: Eastern Visayas
- Province: Samar
- District: 2nd district
- Founded: 1591
- Barangays: 51 (see Barangays)

Government
  - Type: Sangguniang Bayan
  - Mayor: Luz C. Ponferrada
  - Vice Mayor: Honesto M. Zeta
  - Representative: Reynolds Michael Tan
  - Councilors: List: • Pericles L. Cinco; • Catalino S. Jadoc; • Lilian D. Estorninos; • Marilyn M. Homeres; • Elnora C. Quebec; • Mansueto M. Delovino; • Aludia C. Duran; • Vicente C. Labuac; DILG Masterlist of Officials
  - Electorate: 40,965 voters (2025)

Area
  - Total: 513.01 km^{2} (198.07 sq mi)
- Elevation: 4.0 m (13.1 ft)
- Highest elevation: 81 m (266 ft)
- Lowest elevation: 0 m (0 ft)

Population (2024 census)
  - Total: 57,645
  - Density: 112.37/km^{2} (291.03/sq mi)
  - Households: 13,694

Economy
  - Income class: 1st municipal income class
  - Poverty incidence: 30.4% (2023)
  - Revenue: ₱ 290.1 million (2024)
  - Assets: ₱ 113.1 million (2024)
  - Expenditure: ₱ 287 million (2024)
  - Liabilities: ₱ 254.5 million (2024)

Service provider
  - Electricity: Samar 2 Electric Cooperative (SAMELCO 2)
- Time zone: UTC+8 (PST)
- ZIP code: 6720
- PSGC: 0806002000
- IDD : area code: +63 (0)55
- Native languages: Waray; Tagalog

Basey, officially the Municipality of Basey (/bɑːˈsaɪ/ bah-SY; Waray: Bungto han Basey; Tagalog: Bayan ng Basey), is a municipality in the province of Samar, Philippines. According to the 2024 census, it has a population of 57,645 people.

On 8 November 2013, Basey was one of the places heavily devastated by Super Typhoon Haiyan, leaving more than 200 people dead.

Basey, strategically located across Tacloban, has become a satellite commercial and trade center in the southwestern area of Samar.

== Etymology ==
The town's name is pronounced "Basai" or "Basay" (how the Germans or Pangasinense would pronounce it), not "basÉY". This mispronunciation was propagated by American soldiers in the early days of the American colonial period. There is no "ey" sound in the Waray-Waray language, rather the "e" and "i" sounds are treated separately. Basay is from the Waray word mabaysay, meaning "beautiful".

== Geography ==
=== Barangays ===
Basey is politically subdivided into 51 barangays. Each barangay consists of puroks and some have sitios.

In 1957, the sitio of Cancoral was converted into the barrio of Roxas.

- Amandayehan
- Anglit
- Bacubac
- Baloog
- Basiao
- Buenavista
- Burgos
- Cambayan
- Can-abay
- Cancaiyas
- Canmanila
- Catadman
- Cogon
- Dolongan
- Guintigui-an
- Guirang
- Balante
- Iba
- Inuntan
- Loog
- Mabini
- Magallanes
- Manlilinab
- Del Pilar
- May-it
- Mongabong
- New San Agustin
- Nouvelas Occidental
- Old San Agustin
- Panugmonon
- Pelit
- Baybay (Poblacion)
- Buscada (Poblacion)
- Lawa-an (Poblacion)
- Loyo (Poblacion)
- Mercado (Poblacion)
- Palaypay (Poblacion)
- Sulod (Poblacion)
- Roxas
- Salvacion (Jinamoc Island)
- San Antonio (old name Binatac)
- San Fernando
- Sawa
- Serum
- Sugca
- Sugponon
- Tinaogan
- Tingib
- Villa Aurora
- Binongtu-an
- Bulao

=== Climate ===
Climate data for Basey, Samar
Month	Jan	Feb	Mar	Apr	May	Jun	Jul	Aug	Sep	Oct	Nov	Dec	Year
Mean daily maximum °C (°F)	28 (82)	28 (82)	29 (84)	30 (86)	30 (86)	30 (86)	29 (84)	30 (86)	30 (86)	29 (84)	29 (84)	28 (82)	29 (84)
Mean daily minimum °C (°F)	22 (72)	22 (72)	22 (72)	23 (73)	24 (75)	24 (75)	24 (75)	24 (75)	24 (75)	24 (75)	23 (73)	23 (73)	23 (74)
Average precipitation mm (inches)	90 (3.5)	67 (2.6)	82 (3.2)	70 (2.8)	97 (3.8)	145 (5.7)	142 (5.6)	127 (5.0)	132 (5.2)	152 (6.0)	169 (6.7)	144 (5.7)	1,417 (55.8)
Average rainy days	17.0	13.5	16.0	16.5	20.6	24.3	26.0	25.4	25.2	26.4	23.0	21.0	254.9
Source: Meteoblue

== Demographics ==
Population census of Basey
Year	Pop.	±% p.a.
1903	13,504	—
1918	18,100	+1.97%
1939	28,296	+2.15%
1948	35,523	+2.56%
1960	29,680	−1.49%
1970	35,165	+1.71%
1975	37,890	+1.51%
1980	36,760	−0.60%
1990	39,137	+0.63%
1995	40,114	+0.46%
2000	43,809	+1.91%
2007	48,389	+1.38%
2010	50,423	+1.51%
2015	55,480	+1.84%
2020	56,685	+0.45%
2024	57,645	+0.40%
Source: Philippine Statistics Authority

== Economy ==
Poverty incidence of Basey

Source: Philippine Statistics Authority

== Tourism ==
The town of Basey is famous for its beautiful Sohoton Caves, whose inner chamber features stalactites, stalagmites, and an underground river. The town is also known for artistically woven decorative mats called Banig. Tourists buy these mats as souvenir items.

Binatac Point named after the Datu Binatak is located in Barangay San Antonio (formerly known as Barangay Binatac) in Basey, Samar, is a coastal historical landmark. It served as a major military base during the Battle of Leyte Gulf between the Allied and Axis powers. The natural terrain of Binatac Point played a significant role in the eventual defeat of the Japanese army.
