= List of people from Leyte =

The following is a list of notable people who were either born in, lived in, are current residents of, or are closely associated with the province of Leyte, Philippines (including from the independent cities of Tacloban and Ormoc):

== Entertainment ==
- Analyn Barro - actress (Ormoc)
- Kim Chiu - Pinoy Big Brother Teen Edition winner; television and movie star (has roots and partly grew up in Tacloban)
- Monica Cuenco - singer, theater actress (Ormoc)
- Karla Estrada - actress and singer (Tacloban)
- Richard Gomez - actor, Former Ormoc City mayor, current Congressman of 4th District, Leyte (Ormoc)
- Lucy Torres-Gomez - actress, Former Congresswoman of 4th District, Leyte, Ormoc City mayor (Ormoc)
- Jose Mari Gonzales - actor, father of former mayor Cristina Gonzales-Romualdez (Tacloban)
- Carlo Francisco Manatad - filmmaker and film editor (Tacloban)
- Rudy Robles - actor (Tacloban)
- Cristina Romualdez - former actress, former mayor of Tacloban City (Tacloban)

== Music ==
- Bullet Dumas - indie and contemporary folk singer-songwriter (Tacloban)
- Mike Hanopol - musician, singer-songwriter (Carigara)
- Ruby Ibarra - Filipina-American rapper (Tacloban)
- Danny Javier, OPM singer and musician from APO Hiking Society (Abuyog)
- Jean-Paul Verona - award-winning producer and recording engineer best known for his work on Ben&Ben's Limasawa Street and Pebble House, Vol. 1: Kuwaderno albums and the band version of SB19's "Mapa" single (Tacloban)

== Politics ==
- Jaime C. de Veyra - Resident Commissioner to the U.S. House of Representatives from the Philippine Islands from 1917 to 1923 and the 1st Governor of Leyte (Tanauan)
- Ted Failon - news anchor, TV and radio personality, former Representative of the 1st District of Leyte (Tacloban, Jaro)
- Lolita Javier, incumbent representative for Leyte's 2nd congressional district (Javier, Jaro)
- Leopoldo Petilla - former governor of Leyte (Palo)
- Alfred Romualdez - current mayor and former Representative for Leyte's 1st District (Tacloban)
- Benjamin Romualdez - former governor of Leyte; former ambassador to the US, China and Saudi Arabia (Tacloban)
- Ferdinand Martin Romualdez - Representative of the 1st District of Leyte; incumbent Speaker of the House of Representatives of the Philippines (Tacloban)
- Imelda Romualdez-Marcos - former First Lady and former Representative for Leyte's 1st District (Tacloban)
- Nimfa C. Vilches - judge and Supreme Court deputy administrator (Tacloban)
- Maria Salud T. Vivero - Parreño - Lawyer, Judge, Politician & Housing Expert, The First Female Governor of Leyte (1946 - 1948), Vice Governor of Leyte (1963 - 1965) and First Female Lawmaker of Eastern Visayas (Representative, 2nd District of Leyte from 1965 - 1969) (Tolosa, La Paz)

== Sports ==
- Toni Rose Basas - professional volleyball player for the Cignal HD Spikers (Tacloban)
- Robert Bolick - professional basketball player (Ormoc)
- Ely Capacio - basketball player and coach (Palo)
- Glenn Capacio - basketball player and coach (Palo)
- John Riel Casimero - professional boxing World Champion (Mérida, Ormoc)
- Rey Evangelista - former professional basketball player (Ormoc)
- Dennis Daa - professional basketball player (Tacloban)
- Dino Daa - professional basketball player (Tacloban)
- Xyza Gula - volleyball player for the UST Golden Tigresses (Tacloban)
- Chico Lanete and Garvo Lanete - professional basketball players (Ormoc)
- Dan Palami - businessman, former manager of the Philippines national football team (Tacloban)
- Lou Salvador - basketball player (Tacloban)
- Mark Swainston - footballer (Tacloban)
- Aira Villegas - flyweight boxer and Olympic bronze medalist (Tacloban)

== Literature ==
- Merlie Alunan - poet and instructor (Tacloban)
- Francisco Alvarado - Waray-language poet and playwright (Palo)
- Gina Apostol - writer (Tacloban)
- Vicente I. de Veyra - Waray-language poet, anthologist, orthographer and phonetician (Palo, Tanauan)
- Iluminado Lucente ("grand old man of Waray letters") - Waray-language playwright, poet, and mayor of Tacloban (Tacloban, Palo)
- Eduardo Makabenta - Waray-language poet and translator (Carigara)
- Carmen Pedrosa - journalist and author (Palo)

== Others ==
- Charles R. Avila - former Administrator of the Philippine Coconut Authority (Tanauan)
- Norberto Castillo - 91st Rector Magnificus of the University of Santo Tomas (Tacloban)
- Andres Centino - 57th Chief of Staff of the Armed Forces of the Philippines (Tacloban)
- Nieves Fernandez - World War II guerrilla fighter (Tacloban)
- Macario Binatac – early record of hacienderos, principalia and farmland owner (Burauen)
- Pablo Binatac - Brother of Macario Binatac, massive farmland owner in Leyte. He is among the registered owner of multiple hectares of retained land under Department of Agriculture in Leyte. His ascendants are hacienderos known to own multiple lands as big as a whole barangay (ex. Barangay Binatac).
- Bishop Oscar Jaime Florencio - current auxiliary bishop of the Roman Catholic Archdiocese of Cebu and apostolic administrator of the Military Ordinariate of the Philippines (Capoocan)
- Zenaida Monsada - chemist, Department of Energy Officer-in-Charge Secretary (Ormoc)
- Joel Porlares – 14th Supreme Bishop of the Philippine Independent Church (Tacloban)
