= 2010–2011 Philippine floods =

2010–2011 floods in eastern Philippines

- Date: late December 2010-mid January 2011
- Location: Bicol, Central Visayas, Eastern Visayas, Caraga
- Deaths: 40
- Property damage: ₱898,257,068 $20,396,723

Widespread flooding occurred in the eastern part of the Philippines since late December 2010. The Visayas and the Bicol and Caraga regions have been particularly affected by abnormally heavy rains. The floods have displaced 452,999 persons in 19 provinces, and has caused the deaths of 25 people. By 12 January, the National Disaster Risk Reduction and Management Council (NDRRMC) pegged those affected at 235,867 families or 1,230,022 people in 1,267 villages in 137 towns and 10 cities in 23 provinces.

== Cause ==
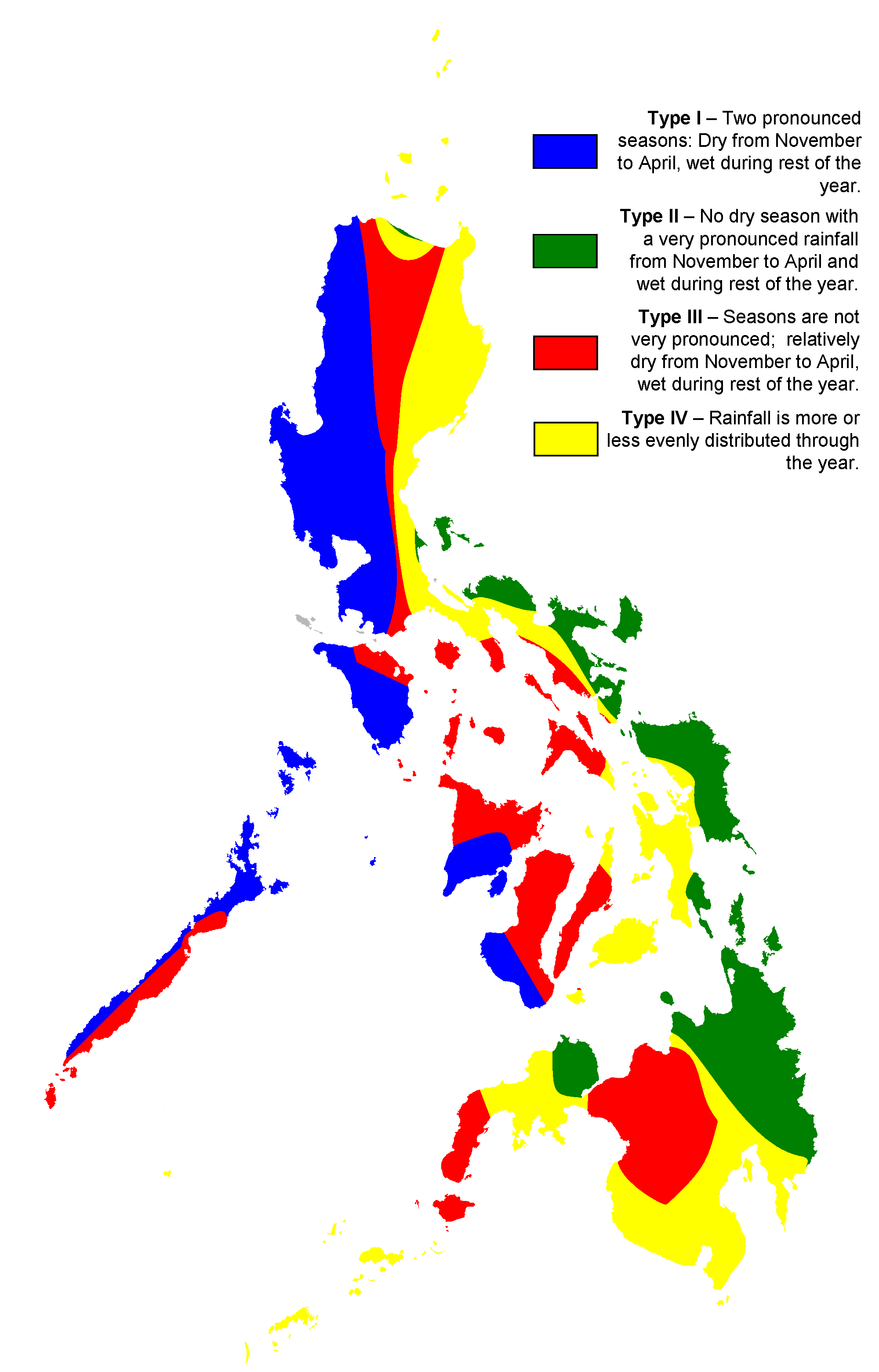
Much of the extent of the flooding is located on the areas of the map shaded green. The green-shaded part of the map receives year-round rainfall.

The cause of the flooding had been blamed on a tail end of a "cold front". While the eastern part of the country experiences rain at this time of the year, the rains were particularly heavy, and were expected to be twice the regular amount.

The Philippine Atmospheric, Geophysical and Astronomical Services Administration forecast the cold front's northerly track, which will move up to northeast Luzon and affect Metro Manila on the second week of January, but not as extensive nor as destructive as the ones that hit Bicol, Visayas and Mindanao. The PAGASA also attributed the stronger-than-normal rainfall to La Niña, which will hit the country later in January up to February.

== Extent ==
=== December 2010 ===
The first reports of flooding were at the Bicol Region provinces of Albay and Sorsogon. In late December, Albay governor Joey Salceda placed the province under a state of emergency after the rains caused the deaths of two people and the displacement of 4,000. He also issued a mandatory evacuation on residents in affected areas. Fears of lahar flows from the recently active Mayon Volcano were dismissed. In adjacent Sorsogon, 170 families were evacuated.

=== 1 to 5 January ===
At the start of the new year, the cold front moved to the central part of the Philippines, stretching a rain band from Southern Leyte to Misamis Oriental. PAGASA forecast more rain until 6 January in these areas. At least five deaths were confirmed in these areas: three children died after being buried by a landslide in Saint Bernard, Southern Leyte, while two others drowned in the same province. The town and five other municipalities in the province lost power. Several towns in Eastern Samar and Northern Samar were flooded. Elsewhere, minor landslides were reported in Hinabangan, Samar and Tacloban. In Cebu City, a flight going to Siargao was canceled, and landslides were reported.

More than 2,000 people were displaced in the Caraga due to the rains. A landslide killed one person in Monkayo, Compostela Valley, while three girls were reported missing in the area.

=== 6 to 10 January ===
On 6 January, the cold front moved to Bicol and brought rains. This caused the evacuation of 8,200 people in the region.

By 6 January, Butuan and the Agusan del Sur towns of Bunawan and San Francisco, and Surigao del Sur were placed under state of calamity as additional seven deaths were recorded. Flood damage to government infrastructure in Caraga was at 141 million Philippine pesos (US$3.2 million).

More than 80% of the evacuees in Albay were sent home after conditions improved on 7 January. Classes that were suspended on 6 January reopened the next day except for schools that were used as evacuation centers. Meanwhile, the floods subsided in Davao del Norte and Compostela Valley, but it destroyed the crops of some 2,100 farmers. The NDRRMC pegged the damages to agriculture and infrastructure nationwide at 183 million pesos (US$4.1 million).

=== 23 January afterwards ===
As of 23 January 2011 the death toll from the floods has risen to 68 with 26 others still missing. Another cause of flooding was the wind convergence.

== Reaction ==
Salceda urged PAGASA to assign names to weather systems that are not storms that cause disruptions. Secretary of Public Works and Highways (DPWH) Rogelio Singson also said in a DWIZ interview that PAGASA "should draw up a classification system, not just for typhoons but also for massive rainfall." PAGASA for their part had already installed automatic weather stations, and established a community-based early warning system.

The Communist Party of the Philippines (CPP), which had been in a decades-long insurgency, instructed its military arm the New People's Army to help in relief operations. The government and the CPP ended their ceasefire on 3 January.
