= Leyte Kalipayan Dance Company =

Philippine folkloric dance troupe

The Leyte Kalipayan Dance Company (LKDC) is a Philippine folkloric dance troupe based in the island of Leyte in the Eastern Visayas region of the Philippines.

== Company ==
The LKDC aims to preserve the cultural heritage of the Philippines and promote it locally and globally.

According to the company's official website: "Its repertoire consists of Philippine traditional dances and music showing a kaleidoscope of Philippine culture through the performing arts."

The company performs dances from different parts of the country. Performers at the LKDC practice 4 to 6 hours almost each day to master the different dances.

== History ==
The company was founded in 1960 at the Holy Infant College in Tacloban City in Leyte by Teresita Veloso Pil. The group was initially called the Leyte Filipiniana Dance Troupe. Sister Mary Canisius, the school directress of Holy Infant College, is also credited as having encouraged the formation of the dance troupe. The troupe first performed in September 1961 at the same college's celebration of its College Day. The success of the dance troupe resulted in invitations for the group to perform in other parts of Tacloban and eventually the rest of the country and the world.

Philippine President Diosdado Macapagal designated the dance troupe as Official Cultural Ambassadors of the Philippines to the United States for 1965. The group toured the United States and even appeared on The Ed Sullivan Show.

In 1975, the group became an independent entity from the Holy Infant College and was reorganized. In 1977, the group received its present name upon the creation of the Leyte Kalipayan Cultural Foundation, which to this day still manages the activities of the dance troupe. The word kalipayan comes from the Waray-Waray language and means happiness.

== Tours ==
The group has toured in various cities around the world in Asia, Europe, the Americas, and the Middle East. Since the company's founding, it has performed in 37 countries.

== Recognitions ==
In 2016, the LKDC received recognition from the World Dance Organization.

In 1980, the company won the silver medal at the International Folklore Festival in Dijon, France.
