= Office of the Court Administrator =

Administrative department of the Supreme Court of the Philippines

- Tanggapan ng Tagapangasiwa ng Hukuman
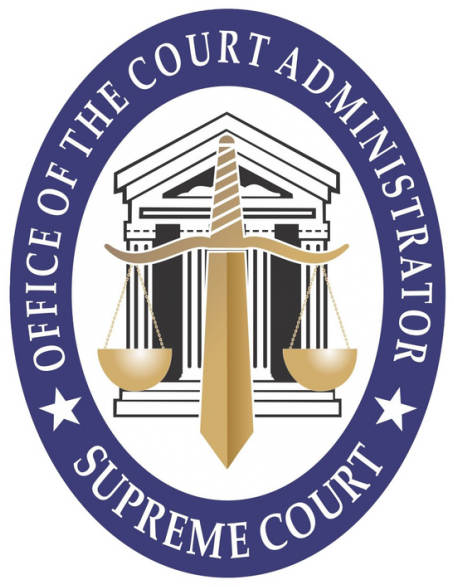

Agency overview
- Agency executive: Maria Theresa Dolores Gomez-Estoesta, court administrator
- Parent department: Supreme Court of the Philippines
- Website: oca.judiciary.gov.ph

The Office of the Court Administrator (Tagalog: Tanggapan ng Tagapangasiwa ng Hukuman, abbreviated OCA) is a department of the Supreme Court of the Philippines tasked primarily with investigating judicial misconduct in the lower courts through audits and filing administrative cases against judges whom they find guilty of corrupt practices, gross negligence, and/or ignorance of the law, which are then heard and ruled on by the Supreme Court en banc. Cases brought by the court administrator can lead to sanctions starting at warnings and fines all the way up to disbarment from the Integrated Bar of the Philippines, forfeiture of benefits, and banning from serving in any public office or government-owned corporation.

The office was established in 1975 by then-President Ferdinand Marcos. The court administrator is appointed by the chief justice of the Philippines and oversees more than 2,600 judges and 25,000 court personnel.
