= Reynaldo Dagsa =

Filipino politician (1975–2011)

- Born: c. 1975; Manila, Philippines
- Died: January 1, 2011 (aged 35–36); Caloocan, Philippines
- Cause of death: Assassination
- Occupations: Politician, Army corporal
- Organization(s): BPAT, ARESCOM/RESCOM
- Known for: Inadvertently photographing his assassin while taking a picture of his family

Reynaldo Dagsa (1975 – January 1, 2011) was a Filipino politician. A member of the Barangay Peacekeeping Action Team, he served as councilman for Barangay 35 in Maypajo, Caloocan until his assassination in 2011. He was also a corporal in the Philippine Army Reserve Command.

== Assassination and photo ==
His death achieved notoriety due to his taking of a New Year's Day family photo on Tuna Street which inadvertently captured the faces of both his killer and a lookout for the killer; the shooter, a convicted robber out on parole, pointed the gun in the photo directly at Dagsa seconds before the shot went off. Dagsa was rushed to Martinez Hospital but was immediately pronounced dead from a .45-caliber gunshot wound to the chest. The photo was later turned over to Caloocan city police; the shooter in the photo was identified as Arnel Buenaflor, who was arrested on January 7, and two suspected accomplices, one Michael Gonzales (alias Fubo of Fish Pond Area I) and Rommel Oliva (alias Balong), were arrested by January 3 in connection with the murder.

Buenaflor was charged with murder by Assistant City Prosecutor Darwin G. Canete after inquest. Buenaflor, a member of the Pasaway Gang, claimed to have shot Dagsa in retribution for being shot in the head by persons associated with Dagsa during a shootout months earlier, while police attributed a motive to Dagsa's peacekeeping efforts in the barangay.
