= Sohoton Caves and Natural Bridge Park =

Protected natural area in the Philippines

Coordinates: 11.3583°N 125.1584°E

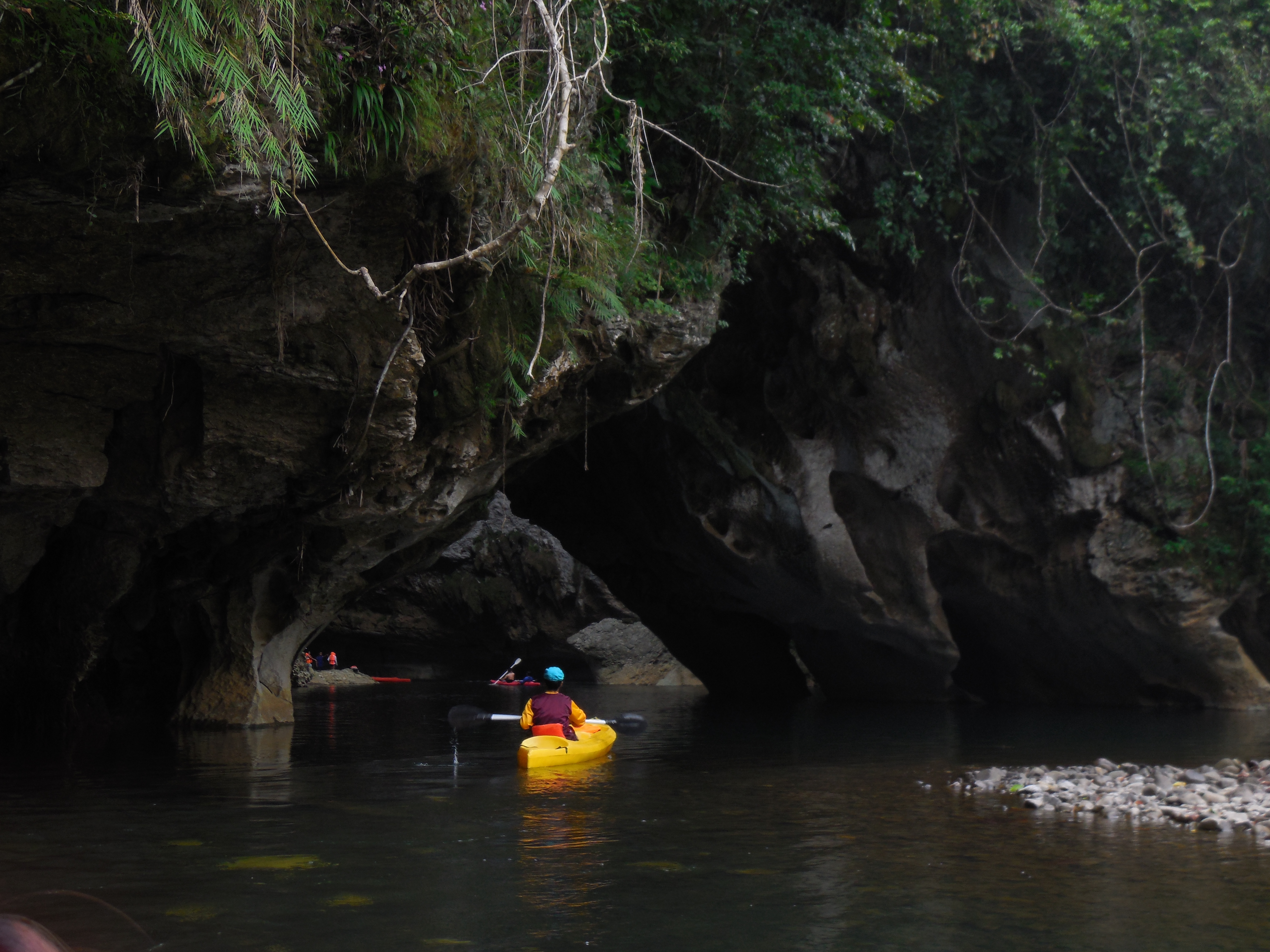
Tourists kayaking through the Sohoton Natural Bridge.

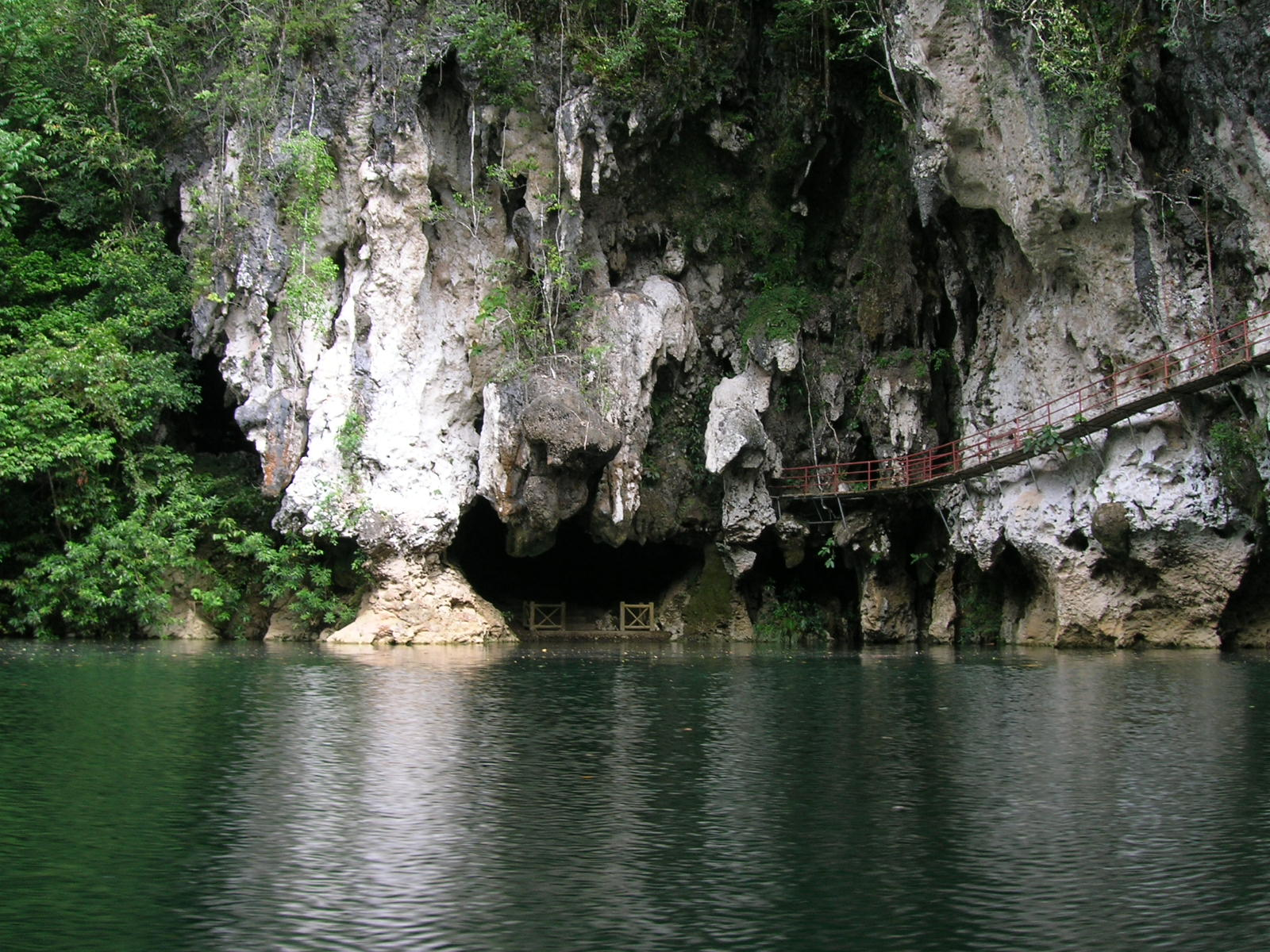
View of the Sohoton Natural Bridge.

The Sohoton Caves and Natural Bridge Park is a protected natural area about 841 ha (8.41 km^{2}) and a tourist attraction within the Samar Island Natural Park. The natural park features caves, subterranean rivers, waterfalls, limestone formations, thick forest and a natural stone bridge. It is just a small portion of the Samar Island Natural Park covering the 3 provinces namely Northern Samar, Eastern Samar and Samar (formerly Western Samar). The entire area is 455,700 ha (4,557 km^{2}), home of the various wildlife, rivers and cave connections. It is located at Brgy. Guirang, Basey and has an area of approximately 840 ha (8.4 km^{2}). First established as the Sohoton Natural Bridge National Park in 1935, it was then renamed as the Sohoton Cave Natural Park, and finally to the Sohoton Cave and Natural Bridge.

== Tourism and access ==
Sohoton Cave and Natural Bridge Park is accessible primarily by boat via river routes from Basey. Visitor activities generally include guided boat trips and cave exploration, with access regulated by local authorities.

In recent years, the site has been included in local tourism initiatives promoting ecotourism in Basey and nearby municipalities. Tourism programs have linked Sohoton Cave and Natural Bridge Park with other natural and cultural attractions in Samar through organized itineraries.

=== Tourism promotion ===
In May 2023, candidates of Miss Universe Philippines 2023 visited Sohoton Cave and Natural Bridge Park as part of a regional tourism tour in Eastern Visayas, which included kayaking and guided exploration of the site.
