= Nimfa C. Vilches =

Filipino judge

Nimfa Cuesta Vilches
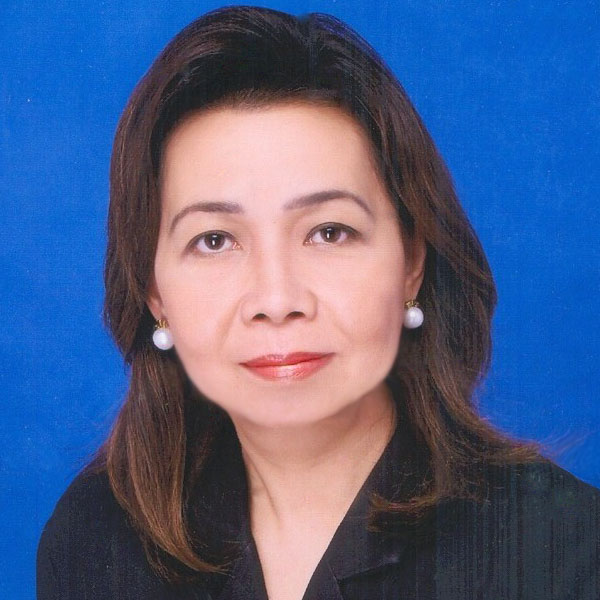
- Born: 6 October 1956; Leyte, Philippines
- Died: 15 December 2011 (aged 55)
- Citizenship: Filipino
- Education: Ateneo de Manila University, Ateneo de Manila Law School
- Occupations: Lawyer, Judge, Law Professor, Deputy Court Administrator
- Employer: Supreme Court of the Philippines

Nimfa Cuesta Vilches was a Senior Deputy Court Administrator (DCA) at the Office of the Court Administrator (OCA), Supreme Court of the Philippines. She was a regional trial court judge in Manila until her appointment as Assistant Court Administrator in 2006 and as DCA in 2008. She was a family law expert in the Philippines and in the international legal community.

== Profile ==
Born to lawyer-father, Benito R. Cuesta I, and an educator mother, Corazon Go, in Tacloban City, Leyte, Philippines on October 6, 1956, Vilches graduated class valedictorian in elementary school and a Gerry Roxas Leadership and Scholarship Awardee in secondary school. She obtained her undergraduate degree in political science at the Jesuit Ateneo de Manila University in 1978 and her Bachelor of Laws at the Ateneo de Manila Law School in 1982. Vilches was a member of the faculty of the Ateneo de Manila Law School and held the Chief Justice Ramon Avancena Professorial Chair in Civil Law. She joined the Supreme Court after her admission to the practice of law in 1983 as Court Attorney to then-Senior Justices Hermogenes Concepcion, Jr.; Jose Y. Feria; and Teodoro Padilla.

Vilches was the second of four daughters. She was married to Salvador C. Vilches, a mediation consultant, with whom she had two children- Steve and Nicole.

In 1989, at the age of 32, Vilches was appointed Presiding Judge of the Municipal Trial Court of Barugo, Leyte, and was later designated by the Supreme Court as Acting Judge in the Metropolitan Trial Courts of Manila, Makati and Caloocan to address clogged court dockets until her appointment as Presiding Judge, Regional Trial Court of Manila, Branch 48, in 1999. In recognition of her notable performance as a regional trial court judge, the Judicial and Bar Council (JBC), Supreme Court, nominated her to the post of Associate Justice of the Court of Appeals in 2004. On September 26, 2006, she was awarded Outstanding Regional Trial Court Judge by the Society for Judicial Excellence, Supreme Court, for exceptional performance as a magistrate for 17 years and for advancing the rights of women and children. She was promoted Assistant Court Administrator the following day September 27, 2006.

As Vice-Chairperson and chief implementer of the "Justice on Wheels", an access to justice by the marginalized sectors program of the Supreme Court from 2008 to 2010, she organized the conduct of court hearings inside mobile court buses in faraway courts with no judges, and in urban courthouses with high criminal dockets, that lead to the release of 5,157 detained prisoners; and introduced the "mobile court-annexed mediation (MCAM)" initiative that brought about the successful settlement (with 96% success rate) of 6,830 pending civil cases.

Vilches, in 2005, ruled on the trailblazing case (Herrera v. Alba and Hon. Nimfa Cuesta Vilches, G.R. No. 148220, June 15, 2005) on the admissibility of DNA evidence in Philippine courts. The decision was affirmed in its entirety on appeal and was much quoted by the Supreme Court. That piece of verdict became one of the starting points of the 2007 Supreme Court Rule on DNA Evidence.

In 1999, Vilches founded the CASA-GAL Program in the Philippines composed of trained community volunteers for children in court that was chosen by UNICEF in 2005 as one of the innovative initiatives for children in Asia and the Pacific. For her outstanding service to the public, Vilches was conferred the 2009 Presidential Lingkod Bayan Award by the Civil Service Commission of the Philippines, the highest recognition given to a government official or employee.

== Notable positions and achievements ==
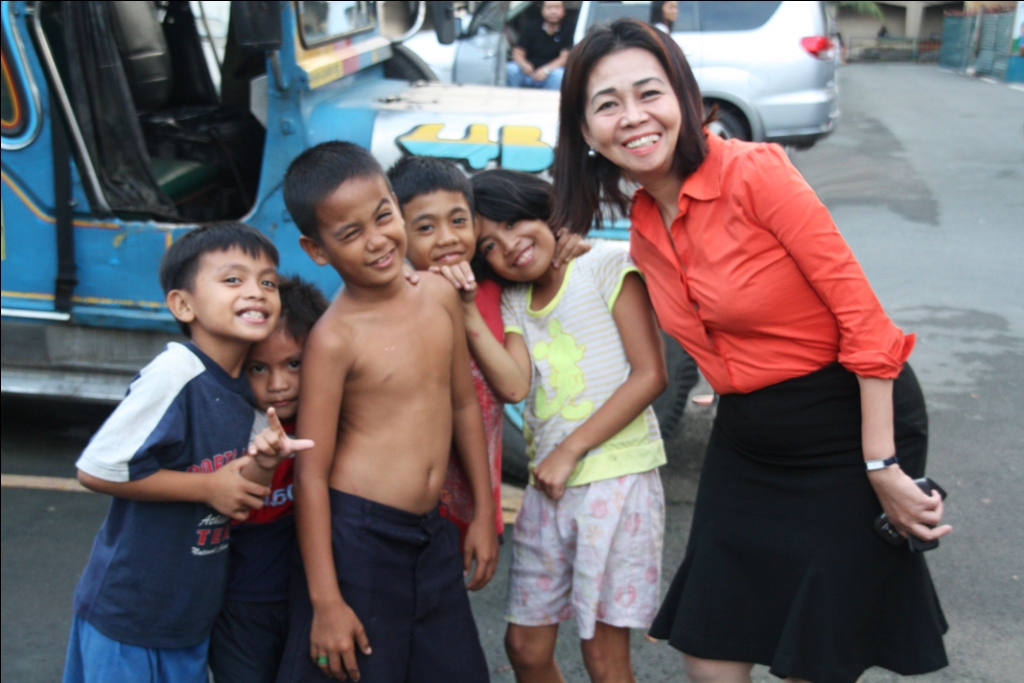
Vilches posing with Filipino children, September 2009.

=== Supreme Court committees ===
- Chairperson, Committee on Legal Fees, Office of the Court Administrator
- Chairperson, Ad hoc Committee for Legal Fees
- Chairperson, Grievance Committee, OCA
- Chairperson, Personnel Evaluation and Review Committee, OCA
- Chairperson, Subcommittee on Justice for Children, Office of the President, Manila
- Vice-Chairperson, Justice on Wheels Committee
- Vice-Chairperson, Legal Research and Method, Philippine Judicial Academy (PhilJA)
- Member, Sub-Committee for Family Courts, Committee on Revision of Rules
- Member, Committee on the Revision of the Benchbook, PhilJA
- Member, Selection and Promotion Board, OCA
- Member, Committee on Gender Responsiveness in the Judiciary
- Member, Research Group, PhilJA

== Academe ==
- Professor II, Philippine Judicial Academy, Supreme Court of the Philippines
- Professor, Ateneo de Manila Law School and holder of the Chief Justice Ramón Avanceña Professorial Chair in Civil Law since 2003
- Lecturer for the Mandatory Continuing Legal Education (MCLE) for the University of the Philippines Institute of Judicial Administration; Integrated Bar of the Philippines (IBP); Philippine Bar Association (PBA); Department of Justice (DOJ); and the Public Attorneys Office (PAO)

== International lectures ==
- Delegate, Philippine Delegation to the UN General Assembly Special Session on Children, New York City, USA, 2003
- Plenary lecturer, “Trafficking in Women and Children” and Session Chair, “Trafficking in Children,” 4th International Conference on Family Law and Children's Rights, Cape Town, South Africa, 2003
- Lecturer, Asian Conference of Social Work Professionals, Kuala Lumpur, Malaysia, 2003
- Lecturer, “Making Juvenile Justice Work,” International Conference on Children's Rights, University of Ottawa, Canada, 2007
- Lecturer, “Phenomena in Juvenile Delinquency,” International Juvenile Justice Observatory (OIJJ), Seville, Spain, 2007
- Lecturer, “Family Mediation,”1st Asian Mediation Association, Singapore, 2009
- Lecturer, “No-Nonsense Court Management,” International Association of Court Administrators Asia-Pacific Conference, Bogor, Indonesia, March 13–16, 2011.

== Works published ==
- B.P. 22: FAQs, Rex Bookstore, 2005
- Are You Ready To Be A CASA/GAL Volunteer? 2001
- DNA and the Courts, 2002
- Trafficking In Women and Children, 2003
- Making Juvenile Justice Work, 2004
- Mediation: Reaching its Potential in Family Law Cases, 2006
- No Nonsense Court Management, 2007
- RA 9184 or the Government Procurement Reform Act: Bane or Boon, 2008
- ADR: The Solutionist Approach to Unclog Court Dockets, 2009

== Scholarships and training ==
- Oxford University, England, Children's Rights: Moving Forward, sponsored by the British Council, 2001
- Hertfordshire, England, Violence against Women: Tackling Trafficking, sponsored by the British Council, 2004
- National Council of Juvenile and Family Court Judges, Nevada, Role of the Judge in a Family Court, sponsored by UNICEF Manila, 1999
- National Council of Juvenile and Family Court Judges, Nevada, Evidence in Family Court, sponsored by the Supreme Court of the Philippines and City of Manila, 2000
- Legal and Social Systems of Sweden, sponsored by Swedish International Development Aid, 2005
- National Judicial Institute of Canada, Vancouver and Kelowna, British Columbia, Evidence, sponsored by the Canadian International Development Aid, 2006
- National Center for State Courts, Orlando Florida USA, Court Management, sponsored by the USAID and The Asia Foundation, 2007

== See also ==
- Ateneo Law School
