= Carmelita Abdurahman =

Filipino academic

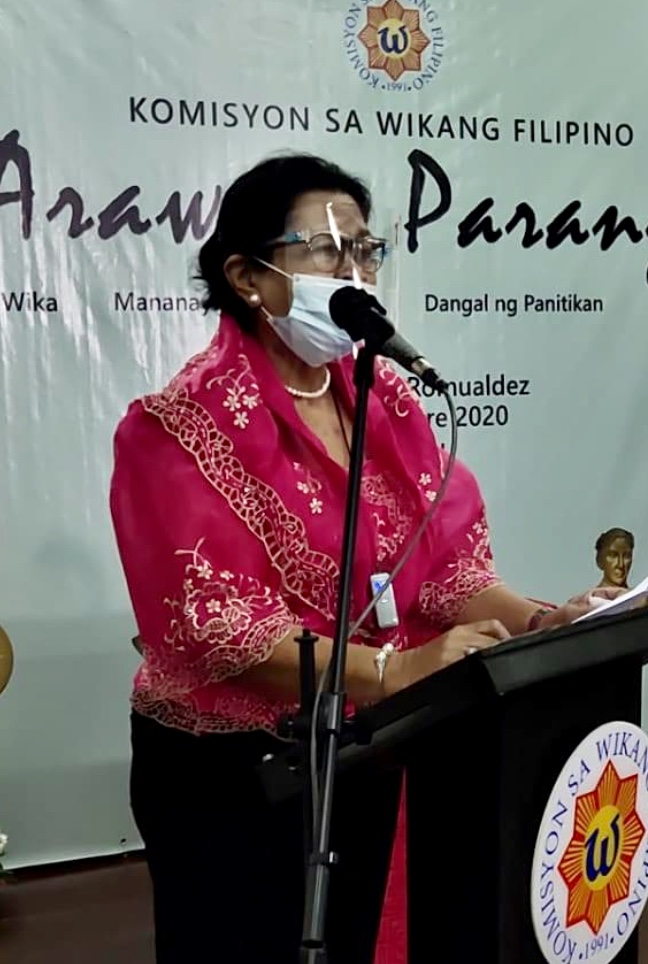
- Carmelita Abdurahman in 2020 as newly designated commissioner for Waray language of Samar–Leyte delivering speech inside the hall of Komisyon sa Wikang Filipino
- Born: Carmelita Yboa Carnacite; Catbalogan, Samar
- Other name: "Melit"
- Education: Saint Mary's College of Catbalogan; Samar College
- Occupations: Professor, Commissioner
- Years active: 2009–present
- Organization(s): PASATAF; Komisyon sa Wikang Filipino
- Term: 2020–2027
- Predecessor: Jerry Gracio
- Spouse: Rheamil Abdurahman
- Children: Marisol Abdurahman

Carmelita Yboa Carnacite-Abdurahman is a Filipino academic in the field of Filipino language studies.

== Biography ==
Abdurahman earned two doctorate degrees namely PhD and EdD in Filipino. She was appointed by the President of the Philippines as commissioner of Komisyon sa Wikang Filipino (Commission on the Filipino Language) for the Waray language of Samar-Leyte. She is also a consultant on Filipino language to the Department of Education. After her term, she was installed as president of Pambansang Samahan ng mga Tagamasid at tagapagtaguyod ng Filipino (PASATAF). She is now the head of the education department of Saint Mary’s College of Catbalogan and a part-time instructor at Samar College and Samar State University handling Filipino-related subjects.

On October 27, 2020, she was appointed again as the full-time commissioner for Waray language in Commission on the Filipino Language (Komisyon sa Wikang Filipino) by President Rodrigo Duterte for a term expiring on January 6, 2027 prior to the controversial resignation of Jerry Gracio to the said position.

== Personal life ==
Abdurahman is married to local politician Rheamil Abdurahman and mother of the TV news reporter and senior news correspondent of GMA News Marisol Abdurahman.
