= Samar College =

Private school in Samar, Philippines

- Kolehiyo ng Samar (Filipino); Eskuwelahan Tersyedad han Samar (Waray)
- Former name: Samar Junior College
- Type: Private, Nonsectarian
- Established: 1949
- Students: Around 5,000
- Location: Mabini Avenue, Catbalogan, Samar, Philippines; 11°46′41″N 124°52′57″E
- Colors: Emerald Green
- Website: samarcollege.edu.ph
- Location in the Visayas Location in the Philippines

Samar Colleges, Inc. (Filipino: Kolehiyo ng Samar; Waray: Eskuwelahan Tersyedad han Samar; abbreviated as SC) is a private school in Catbalogan, Samar, Philippines. It was founded in 1949 as the Samar Junior College and initially offered Elementary Teacher Certificate and Associate in Arts. Bachelor's degree programs in Education were opened in the 1950s, while the Bachelor of Science in Commerce followed in the 1980s. The college expanded its undergraduate programs throughout the years, and it eventually established the College of Graduate Studies in the late 1990s. This was also the same time that the high school and elementary departments were opened.

At present, Samar College provides programs in the elementary, junior high school, senior high school, undergraduate, and graduate levels. The college department has five academic units which offer courses in Criminology, Business Administration, Elementary and Secondary Education, English Language, Information Technology, College of Arts and sciences. For college graduates who wish to pursue further studies, SC's College of Graduate Studies has an MA in Education program.

== Reputation ==
- Samar College perfected a cultural dance troupe called the Rayhak Dance Troupe. It is famous and sought after by organizers of big events such as the Manaragat Festival in Catbalogan, the Mutya han Samar Beauty Pageant in Samar, and the Department of Tourism's “Festival of Festivals” in Manila.

== See also ==
- Saint Mary’s College of Catbalogan
- Samar State University
- Northwest Samar State University
