= DYMS =

DYMS may refer to the following stations in Catarman:

- DYMS-AM, an AM radio station branded as Aksyon Radyo
- DYMS-FM, an FM radio station branded as MSFM
