= Tacloban City Convention Center =

Public indoor arena in Tacloban, Philippines

Tacloban Super Arena
- Tacloban Astrodome; Tacloban City Coliseum
- Interactive map of Tacloban Super Arena
- Location: Tacloban, Philippines
- Coordinates: 11°13′18″N 125°00′18″E
- Owner: City Government of Tacloban
- Capacity: 4,500

Construction
- Groundbreaking: 2005
- Opened: 2006
- Cost: ₱200 million

Tenant
- Philippine Basketball Association (out-of-town games)

The Tacloban City Convention Center, also known as the Tacloban Astrodome or the Tacloban City Coliseum, is an indoor arena located in Tacloban, Philippines. It has a seating capacity of 4,500. The facility which had a soft opening in June 2006, was built at a cost of 200 million pesos. It is used primarily for basketball, concerts, regional events and other conventions. It is the second-largest indoor arena in the Eastern Visayas region, after the Ormoc Superdome in Ormoc.

== Usage ==
The arena is used for some out-of-town games of the Philippine Basketball Association. The arena is also used for concerts, boxing, conventions, trade shows, graduation ceremonies and other special events, like the Ms. Tacloban pageant.

The arena was also used as a temporary evacuation center for the victims of Typhoon Haiyan (known as Typhoon Yolanda in the Philippines) when it struck the Philippines in 2013. The building itself was not spared from the super typhoon's assault and sustained numerous damages in several areas. The disaster's aftereffects can still be seen today. As a result, the local authorities made the decision to convert a portion of the building into a museum. According to city Vice Mayor Jerry Yaokasin, the museum is a means of reminding people of Tacloban's tragic past and encouraging them to take climate change seriously.

The arena was then used as a vaccination center during the COVID-19 pandemic in Eastern Visayas.
