= Samar National School =

Public high school in Samar, Philippines

- Pambansang Paaralan ng Samar (Filipino)
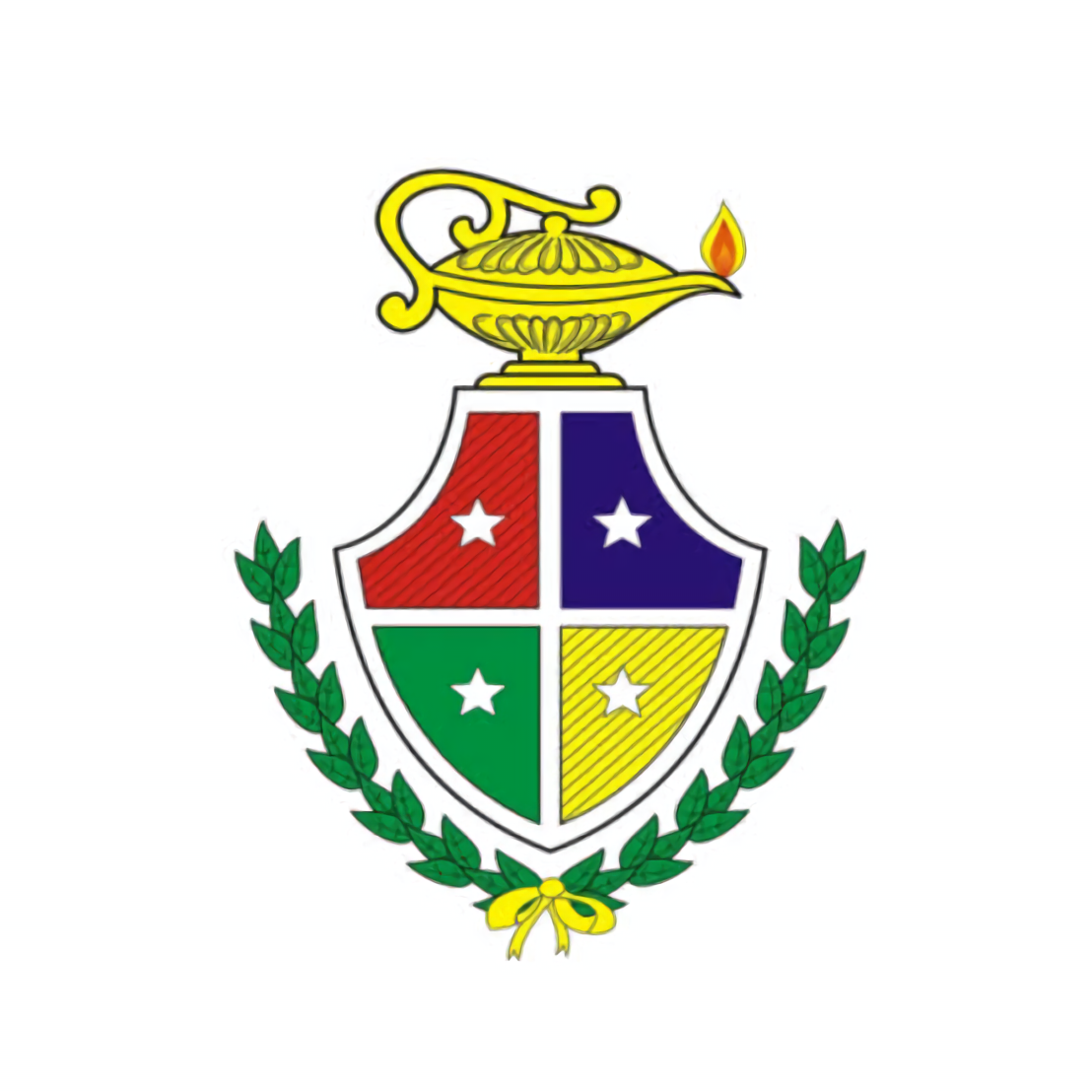

Location
- San Francisco Street; Catbalogan, Samar; Philippines; 11°46′25″N 124°53′02″E

Information
- Type: National High School
- Established: 1903
- Principal: Mr. Rhum O. Bernate
- Enrollment: 6,220 students (2026)
- Color: Maroon
- Athletics: Catbalogan City Athletic Association (CCAA)
- Nickname: Samar High/SNS
- Website: Samar National School

Samar National School (SNS) (Filipino: Pambansang Paaralan ng Samar) has won research awards. It is the mother school of the province of Samar, under the Catbalogan Division, Philippines, located in its capital city, Catbalogan, and was founded in 1903.

== Early years ==
After a long fierce battle between the Guerillas and American forces, civil government was established in Samar on June 17, 1902, which paved the way for establishment of the primary schools all over Samar. Later, the first high school in the entire island was erected.

Although, the first provincial high school was opened in October 1903, classes formally started in January 1904.

Four teachers were assigned at Samar High School out of 17 American teachers who arrived in Samar. Others went to be assigned in Borongan, Calbayog, Catarman, and other pueblos. With Mr. Fredrick W. Abbot as acting principal, having six teachers under him, the provincial school was housed in the old presidencia building and was renting in various small buildings around town.

In 1915, after ten years of pleading by the people for a school building, a 14-room building was constructed through local funds worth Php 27,384.60, which was originated under Act 1815 clearly specifying that insular loans were made prior to October 15, 1907.

The Samar High School building was inaugurated in 1917, during the incumbency of Governor Clodualdo Lucero. Miss Jean Graham was made the acting Superintendent of the Division of Samar while Mr. George Noland was the principal of the school.

During the inauguration of the school building, its name, Provincial High School was also renamed Catbalogan High School, a name by its three initials CHS at the center of each of the wrought-iron arches that crown the portals of the building this day. Later, the Catbalogan High School was re-baptized Samar High School.

A succession of American principals administered the Samar High School until 1926 when the first Filipino principal was appointed. (see list below)

== Second World War and Post-War Era ==
On December 8, 1941, Samar High school closed its gates because of the ignition of World War II. When the Japanese landed in Catbalogan in May 1942, the Samar High School was made the headquarters of the 9th Infantry Regiment of the Japanese Imperial Army.

After the war, the Bureau of Education reopened all schools in the Philippines in 1945 including Samar High School. Fifty senior students of Class '42 returned to their graduation delayed by World War II

On June 19, 1964, Republic Act 439 sponsored by Congressman Fernando Veloso under the Fifth Congress of the Republic of the Philippines, was passed converting Samar High School into its present National School status to be known as Samar National School. Hence, the Samar National School became the pioneer school of secondary education in Samar.

== Administrators ==
- Claudio D. Alegro (1992-1993)
- Florencio D. Baysa (1993)
- Leovegildo N. Mante (1994-2003)
- Zenaida D. Ycoy (Jul-Nuv 2003, OIC only)
- Antonio F. Caveiro (2003–2012)
- Luz C. Macairan (2012–2017)
- Ruth Cabanganan (2017–2023)
- Rhum Bernate (2023–present)

Currently, the school system is governed by ten dynamic departments led by different competitive department heads:

- Administrative Department = Ranulfo C. Maga
- English Department = Gwen Severo
- Science Department = Brigida Singzon
- MAPEH Department = Gerard Jude Gerodiaz
- Filipino Department = Joy T. Go
- Math Department = Evangelina B. Sagadal
- Aral.Pan Department = Jeffreynald A. Francisco
- TLE Department = Thelma Y. Corrige
- Values Department = Gemma P. Babon

== Curricular Offerings ==
For a school that existed for more than a century, it has been a home for academic excellence standing a vital fortress in educating learners all throughout the Samar Province. At present, Samar National School is offering several curricula that answer the need of its clientele. The following are the curricular offering:

  - Special Program in Journalism (newly offered 2015)
  - Science Technology Engineering and Mathematics Curriculum
  - Special Program in the Arts or SPA
  - Special Program in the Sports
  - Open High School Program of DORP
  - Special Education (for blind, deaf and mute)
  - K-12 Secondary Education Curriculum (Junior High)
  - Senior High School Program (Senior High)
