= Samar =

Island in the Philippines

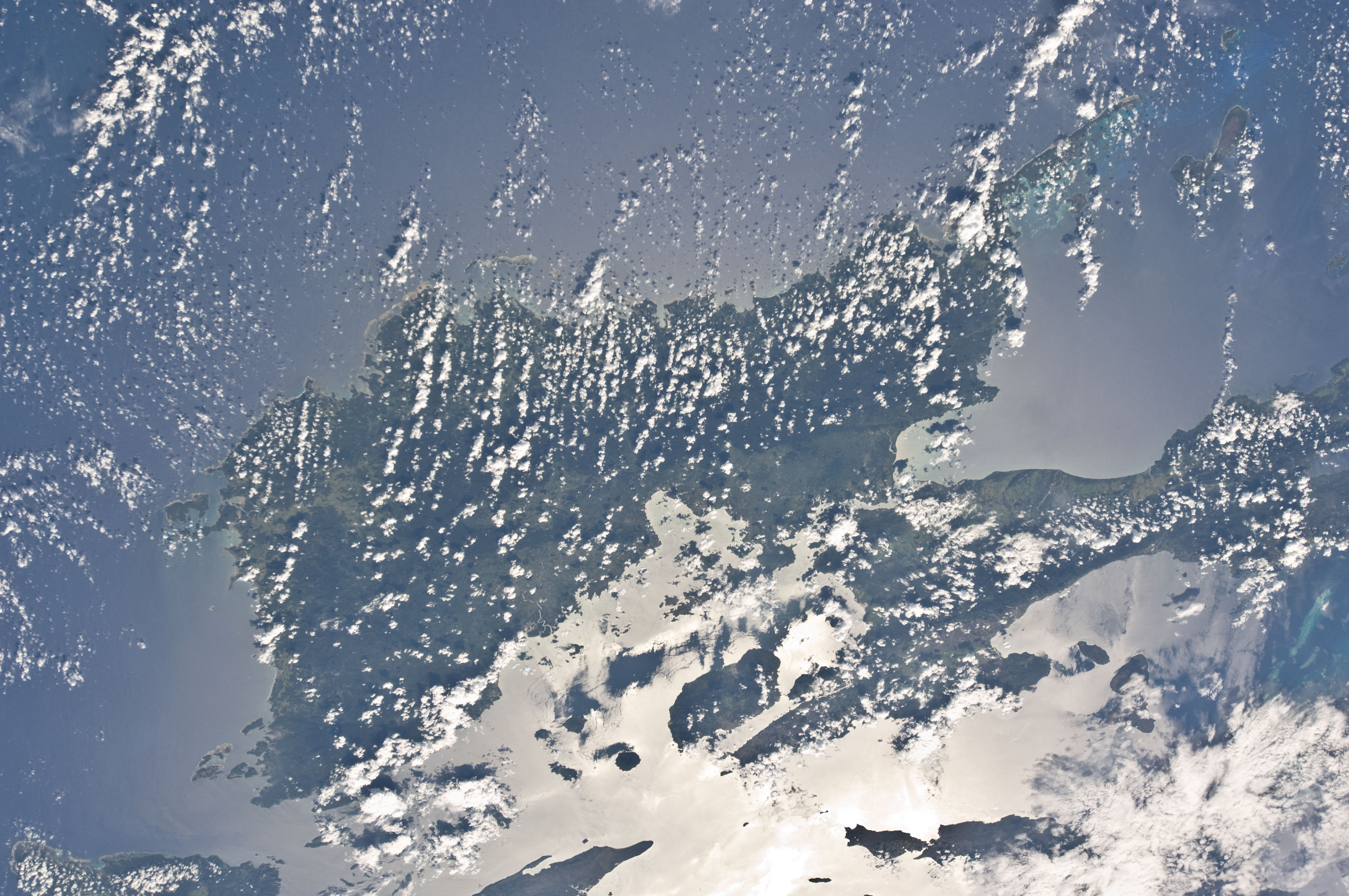
- Photograph from the ISS with east on top; Samar is in the centre, with Leyte in the right foreground.

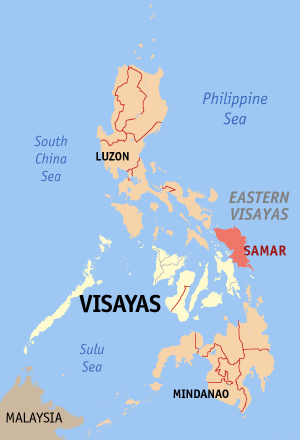
- Location within the Philippines

Geography
- Coordinates: 12°00′N 125°00′E
- Archipelago: Visayas
- Adjacent to: Leyte Gulf; Philippine Sea; Samar Sea; San Bernardino Strait; San Juanico Strait
- Area: 13,428.8 km^{2} (5,184.9 sq mi)
- Area rank: 63rd
- Coastline: 800.6 km (497.47 mi)
- Highest elevation: 890 m (2920 ft)
- Highest point: Mount Huraw

Administration
- Philippines
- Region: Eastern Visayas
- Provinces: Eastern Samar; Northern Samar; (Western) Samar
- Largest settlement: Calbayog (pop. 187,848)

Demographics
- Population: 1,924,651 (2024)
- Pop. density: 140/km^{2} (360/sq mi)
- Languages: Filipino; English; Waray; Mamanwa; Cebuano
- Ethnic groups: Visayans (Waray-Waray); Mamanwa; Samar Agta

Additional information
- Time zone: Philippine Standard Time (UTC+8)

Samar (/ˈsɑːmɑːr/ SAH-mar) is the third-largest island in the Philippines. It has a population of 1,924,651 as of the 2024 census. It is located in the Eastern Visayas region of the Visayas islands. Since 1965, the island is divided into three provinces: Western Samar, Northern Samar, and Eastern Samar. The capitals of these provinces are, respectively, Catarman, Catbalogan, and Borongan. In commemoration of the establishment of these provinces, June 19 is celebrated as an annual holiday. Its main language and ethnicity is Waray and its main religion is Roman Catholic.

The first European sighting of the island was by Ferdinand Magellan on March 16, 1521. Although he did not land, other expeditions were made. Many names, such as Samal, Ibabao, and Tandaya, were given to the island prior to the arrival of the Spaniards in 1596. During the early days of Spanish occupation, Samar was under the jurisdiction of Cebu. Late in the Philippine–American War, months after the dissolution of the First Philippine Republic, Eugenio Daza led a successful attack against the United States Army, which was followed by the Pacification of Samar and the deaths of over 2,000 people. During the American colonization of the Philippines, there were two uprisings, including by the Pulajan movement. The Battle off Samar occurred the island during World War II. During martial law under Ferdinand Marcos, the Sag-od massacre happened in 1981. The New People's Army rebellion is ongoing.

Samar is the easternmost island in the Visayas archipelago, lying to the northeast of Leyte and southeast of the Bicol Peninsula on Luzon. To the west is the Samar Sea, and to the north and east of Samar lies the Philippine Sea. The island has the Samar Island Natural Park and numerous biological discoveries and forests.

The island has major copra and fishery industries and also produces rice, corn, vegetables, and abaca. The island also has a major tourism industry. The island has numerous major highways and has a portion of the Pan-Philippine Highway. The island has four major ports and three airports servicing flights to Cebu City and Metro Manila. The island has six Department of Education divisions and numerous universities with satellite campuses.

== History ==
=== Pre-colonial period (900 AD-1565) ===
Samar was originally led by prominent datus. Among the documented datus are the following: Datu Iberein from Laoang, Northern Samar; Datu Tandaya from Sulat, Eastern Samar; Datu Hadi from Palapag, Northern Samar; and Datu Binatak from Binatac, Southern Samar. According to Precolonial and Contact era sources there was a kingdom in Samar called Tendaya or Kandaya.

The Portuguese who arrived in the Philippines before Spanish colonization and encountered the kingdoms therein have this to say of the kingdom of Tendaya or Kandaya.

~Entry from Duarte Barbosa in, “Livro das coisas do Oriente”, [1516, with later aditions, until 1549]. Maria Augusta da Veiga e Sousa, ed., O Livro de Duarte Barbosa (Edição crítica e anotada), Vol. 2 (Lisbon: Instituto de Investigação Científica Tropical, 2000), 403-407. Original manuscript in Biblioteca Nacional de Portugal, F. G. 11008

"Not very far from these can be found another island of gentiles who are ruled by a king. Its inhabitants have an incredible custom, according to what I have been told. And it is: while being still young men, they saw their teeth close to the gums saying that they do this to make them grow stronger and better aligned. The island is called Tendaya. One finds there much iron that is destined for different ports."

=== Spanish colonialism (1521–1898) ===
Samar was the first island of the Philippines as a Spanish colony. An expedition led by Ferdinand Magellan revealed the island, originally transcribed Zamal in the journal of Antonio Pigafetta, to Europeans. He sighted it on March 16, 1521, traveling from the Mariana Islands. Having found an archipelago, Pigafetta named the islands San Lazaro (transl. Saint Lazarus) due to their sightings on Lazarus Saturday. Eventually, Filipinas was the perceived name for the archipelago. Although Samar was the first island of the Philippines seen by Magellan, he did not land there. He traversed south and laid anchor at Suluan Island, then landed on Homonhon Island on March 17, 1521. Later in the 1700s, Samar was recorded to have about 103 Spanish Filipino families and 3,042 native families.

Other Spaniards eventually landed in the island. William Henry Scott, a historian, recognized that a "Samar datu by the name of Iberein was rowed out to a Spanish vessel anchored in his harbor in 1543 by oarsmen collared in gold; while wearing on his own person earrings and chains." He recounted a Samarnon saga, which was called siday, about Bingi of Lawan, a settlement in Samar. Samar had names which are recorded in early Spanish sources, including Ibabao (or Cibabao), Achan, Camlaya, and Taridola. The Spanish captain Miguel Lopez de Legaspi also called the island Tandaya, after mistaking the name of a lord with the name of the island. This was spelled by Miguel de Loarca as Candaya.

During the early years of the Spanish colonization, the province was placed in the jurisdiction of Cebu but was eventually separated into its own province. A rebellion was sparked in 1649 which was centered in Palapag, causing an uprising in Visayas and parts of Mindanao. The uprising was not suppressed until the next year. This caused rebels to migrate to the mountains and create a new settlement. In 1735, the province and Leyte merged into a singular province; Carigara was declared as the capital. In 1768, Samar was separated from Leyte. The 1835 Census showed Samar had 18,671 native families and also had 174 Spanish-Filipino families. In 1860, the government structure was reorganized and was maintained until the end of the regime.

=== Philippine–American War (1898–1902) ===
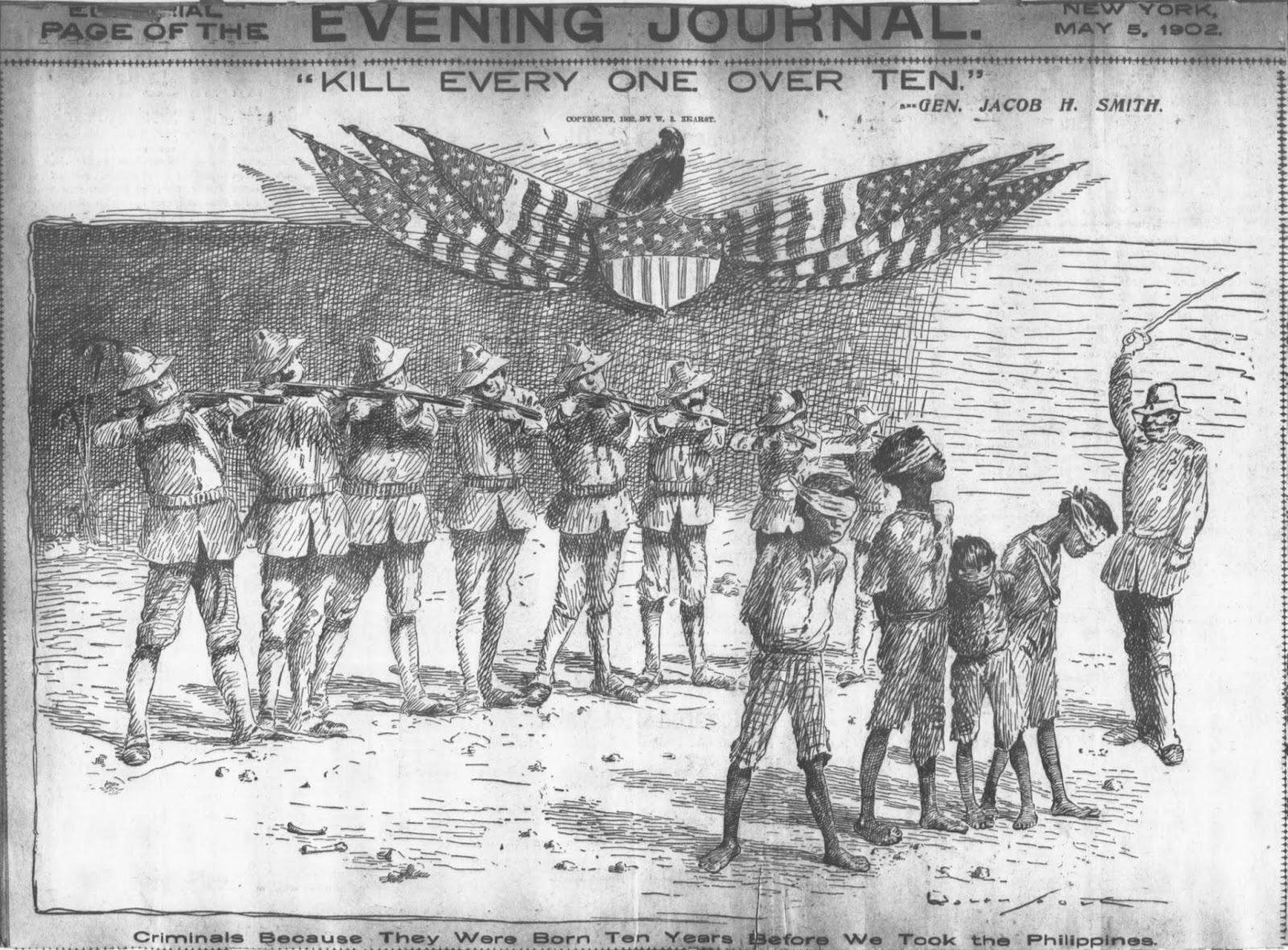
An editorial cartoon depicting deaths caused by Jacob Smith's command

On September 28, 1901, Eugenio Daza–Area Commander of Southeastern Samar–and Valeriano Abanador, the town's police chief, attacked the U.S. Army Company 9th Infantry Regiment who were occupying Balangiga. This action, commonly known as the Balangiga massacre, was a rare Filipino win and a bad loss for American soldiers. In 1989, "Balangiga Encounter Day" was made a provincial holiday in Eastern Samar in lieu of the victory. In retaliation for the massacre, General Jacob H. Smith ordered his men to "kill and burn", further stating that "the more you kill and burn, the better it will please me". This command led to the deaths of 2,000 Filipino insurgents and civilians while sparking outrage in the United States. In his historical account of the war, Brian McAllister Linn asserts "Samar cast a pall on the army's achievement and, for generations, has been associated in the public mind as typifying the Philippine War."

=== American and Japanese colonization; World War II (1902–1946) ===
After the war, the archipelago was peaceful except the island of Samar, which was a "dark and bloody" isle according to James Henderson Blount. In 1904, the Pulajans in Samar caused powerful massacres to the extent of Governor-General Luke Edward Wright's concern. Numerous civilians joined the uprising due to the feeling of "unprotection". The rebellion was discussed by many American politicians and military officers and caused court cases just before the 1904 United States presidential election. Four days after the election, Wright visited Samar, where troops increased to 2,000 from 700. After battles and negotiations, the uprising eventually ended in 1906. When the rebellion ended, the island, according to Blount, started becoming "peaceful". More revolts were made by religious associations in the 1920s to 1930s.

In World War II, the ocean east of the island hosted the Battle off Samar in October 1944 wherein an unarmored force of United States Navy escorts defended attacks from the main force of the Imperial Japanese Navy, including the Japanese battleship Yamato. When Japan colonized the Philippines, the Pulajan uprising became active again. Japan left the Philippines in 1945.

=== Marcos's dictatorship era (1965-1986) ===
The beginning months of the 1970s marked a period of turmoil and change in the Philippines as well as in Samar, as unprecedented number of foreign debt-funded public works projects during Ferdinand Marcos' 1969 reelection campaign led to the 1969 Philippine balance of payments crisis and resulting inflation triggered the First Quarter Storm protests. Three years later and with only a year left in his last constitutionally allowed term as president, Ferdinand Marcos placed the Philippines under Martial Law in September 1972 and thus retained the Presidency for fourteen more years. This period in Philippine history is remembered for the Marcos administration's record of human rights abuses, particularly targeting political opponents, student activists, journalists, religious workers, farmers, and others who fought against the Marcos dictatorship.

==== Deforestation during Martial Law and the Sag-od Massacre ====
The Marcos era was a time of significant deforestation in Samar and throughout the Philippines, with the forest cover of the Philippines shrinking until only 8% remained. On the island of Samar, whose forest cover had been at 86% of the island in 1972, forest cover went down to 45% in 1978, and then a mere 10% by 1987. Twelve companies were given Timber License Agreements (TLAs) on the island, including Dolores Timber in the Province of Samar and San Jose Timber in the province of Northern Samar, which were both owned by Juan Ponce Enrile, the government official Ferdinand Marcos had put in place to approve Timber License Agreements during Martial Law.

One of the infamous incidents of the Marcos dictatorship era was the Sag-od massacre in Las Navas, Northern Samar, which took place on September 15, 1981. Numerous security personnel of Juan Ponce Enrile's San Jose Timber Corporation allied with a paramilitary group called "the Lost Command" and ordered residents of Barrio Sag-od out of their homes, then opened fire on them. Forty-five people were killed, leaving only 13 inhabitants of Barrio Sag-od alive.

==== Construction of the San Juanico Bridge ====
This era also saw the construction of the San Juanico Bridge between Samar and Leyte, which began as one of the high-visibility foreign-loan funded projects of Ferdinand Marcos' 1969 reelection campaign, and finished four years later in time to be inaugurated on then-First Lady Imelda Marcos' birthday on July 2, 1973. The project was initially criticised as a white elephant by officials at the National Economic and Development Authority, noting that it was "useless and expensive to maintain", because its average daily traffic was too low to justify the cost of its construction. As a result, its construction has been associated with what has been called the Marcoses' "edifice complex" although economic activity in Samar and Leyte has since finally caught up with the bridge's intended function. At the time, its name was used as a slang term for one of the torture methods used by the Marcos dictatorship, in which a person is being beaten while the victim's head and feet lay on separate beds and the body is suspended as though to form a bridge.

==== The New People's Army conflict ====
Although the Communist Party of the Philippines and its armed wing, the New People's Army, was newly-formed and relatively still very small throughout Marcos' second term, the Marcos administration hyped up its formation, supposedly because this would help build up political and monetary support from the US, which was caught up in red scare paranoia at the time. When Marcos declared Martial Law, however, the CPP grew rapidly.

On the island of Samar, Marcos' military forces were assigned to protect the logging concessions, and there were frequent encounters between the military and the New People's Army. As a result the towns of Taft, Dolores, Can-avid, and Oras in Eastern Samar were declared by the Military as "no-man's-land" areas from 1978 to 1982.

Since then, the island had numerous human rights cases due to the New People's Army rebellion.

In May 2024, the Department of the Interior and Local Government announced that the three provinces on the island of Samar were "free of NPA influence" with no single village in three Samar provinces is under the influence of NPA [that] year.

=== Contemporary history (1986–present) ===
In 2013, the provinces of Samar, Eastern Samar, and the City of Tacloban were among the localities most severely impacted by Typhoon Haiyan.

In 2020, Samar was also heavily impacted by the COVID-19 pandemic in Eastern Visayas, with the first case in the region reported on March 23, 2020.

== Geography ==
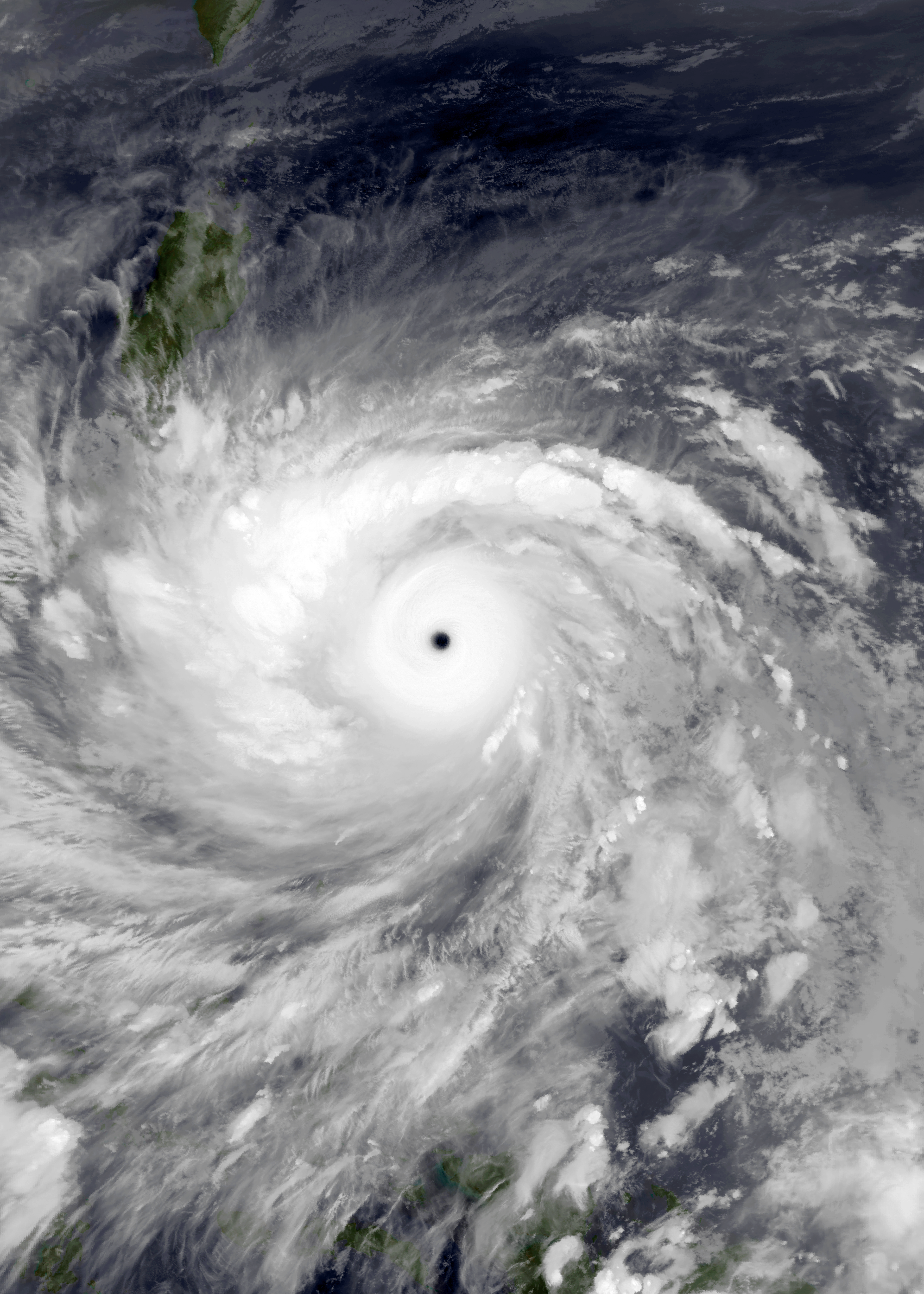
Typhoon Haiyan striking the island; the typhoon devastated a large part of the Philippines.

Samar is the third-largest island in the Philippines by area, after the islands of Luzon and Mindanao. Mount Huraw is Samar's highest point, with an elevation of 2,920 ft (890 m). Samar is the easternmost island in the Visayas. It lies to the northeast of Leyte, separated from it by the San Juanico Strait. The island lies to the southeast of the Bicol Peninsula on Luzon, separated from it by the San Bernardino Strait. To the west is the Samar Sea, and to the north and east of Samar lies the Philippine Sea. The island is hilly yet has lower altitude than the mountainous terrain in the rest of the Visayas. Lowlands are mostly found near the coast and along rivers; the rivers themselves are small and flow in a radial pattern. The island, along with the region of Eastern Visayas, is rainy most of the year, ranging from seven to ten months of rain. Numerous typhoons are formed in the area. Eastern Samar, specifically, has a Type II climate without a dry season with an increase in rainfall. A portion of the Philippine Trench rests near Samar, capable of generating a magnitude 8.1 earthquake. The island, particularly parts of Paranas, contains many volcanic rocks, including karst bauxite, common throughout the island.

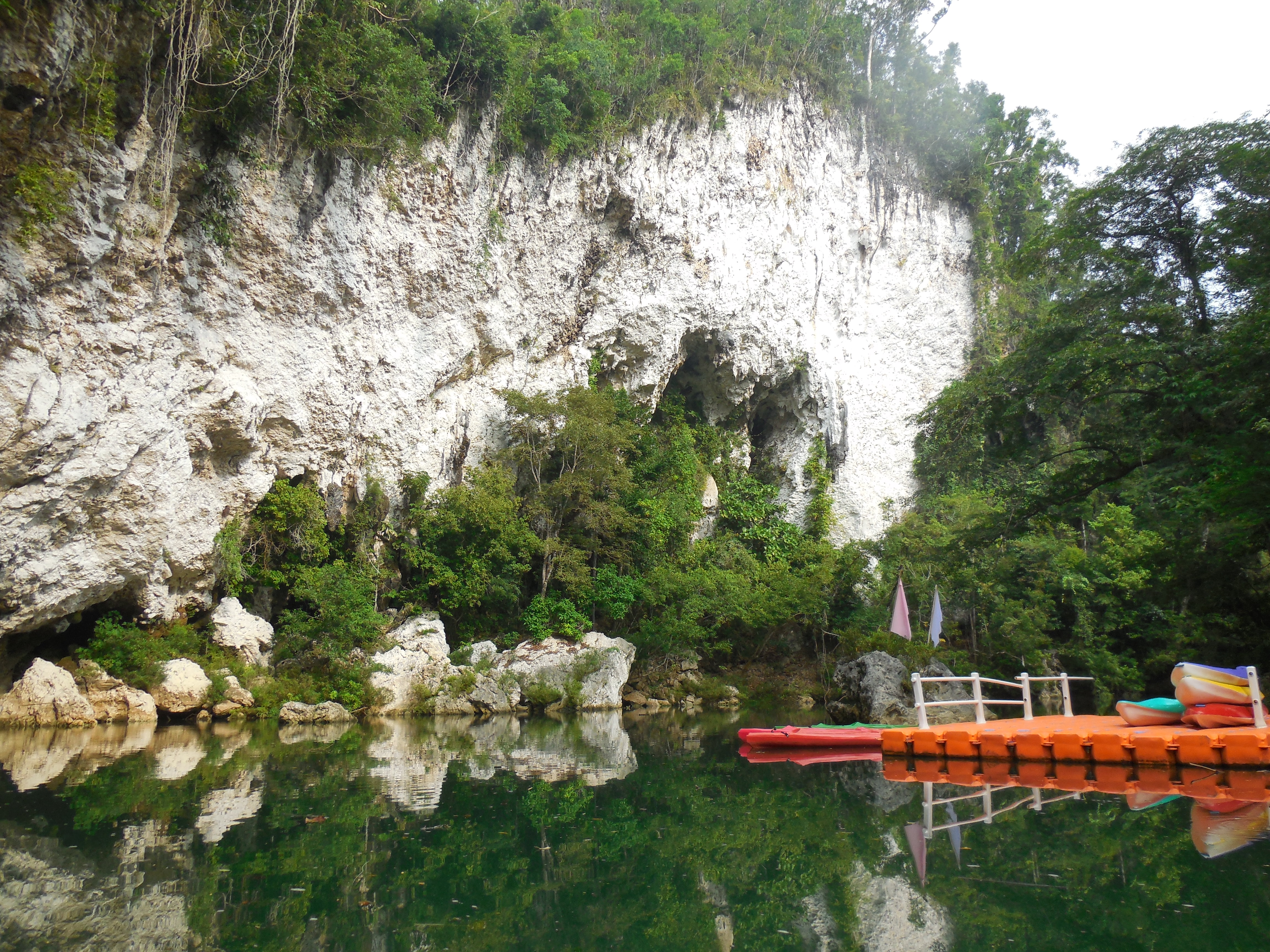
The Panhulugan Cliff at the Sohoton Natural Bridge Park, a part of the Samar Island Natural Park

=== Flora and fauna ===
The Samar Island Natural Park is a 300,000-hectare (740,000-acre) forest on the island, encompassing all three provinces. It contains the largest tract of intact lowland forest in the Philippines. The park has a population of Dipterocarpaceae species, six of them are endangered, and contains the rare Philippine eagle. The park contains six ecological forest types and has numerous waterfalls. Species in the island itself include the Philippine sailfin lizard, the Mindanao flying dragon, the Philippine hawk-eagle, the giant golden-crowned flying fox, the red-vented cockatoo, and the Philippine crocodile. The municipality of Basey contains Karst forests with a total of 67 vascular plant species. In these forests, Dipterocarpaceae is the most prominent plant family. Out of 2,400 flower species throughout the Philippines, 40 are only found in the island. In 2018, three new species of Begonia were found in the isle. The province of Northern Samar was described by Tiffany Neri of SunStar as one of the Philippines' "best-kept secrets" with numerous rock formations and wildlife sanctuaries. On June 9, 2025, the Biri Rock Formations in Northern Samar were declared to be a National Geological Monument according to the Department of Environment and Natural Resources.

== Demographics ==
Population of Samar

Year	Pop.	±%
1903	266,237	—
1918	379,575	+42.6%
1939	546,306	+43.9%
1948	757,212	+38.6%
1960	867,994	+14.6%
1970	1,019,358	+17.4%
1975	1,120,192	+9.9%
1980	1,200,592	+7.2%

Year	Pop.	±%
1990	1,246,722	+3.8%
1995	1,405,892	+12.8%
2000	1,517,585	+7.9%
2007	1,650,022	+8.7%
2010	1,751,267	+6.1%
2015	1,880,020	+7.4%
2020	1,909,537	+1.6%
2024	1,924,651	+0.8%

Source: Philippine Statistics Authority

As of the 2024 census, the population of the island's three provinces was 1,924,651. The main language in all three provinces of Samar Island is Waray. The second most popular language in Samar province is Bisaya, while the second most popular in Eastern Samar and Northern Samar is Cebuano. Samar province and Northern Samar both have a scale of 0.13 in the Linguistic diversity index while Eastern Samar has a scale of 0.02. Many people in the island are part of the Waray people: in Eastern Samar, 97.78 percent of people were Waray while in Samar, 91.45 classified themselves as Waray. Other ethnic groups include Bisaya, Cebuano, and Tagalog. Males were more populated in both provinces than women. As of the 2020 census, 1790014 people in the island are Roman Catholic, 1573 are Islam, and 14643 are part of the Iglesia ni Cristo church. In all three provinces, more than 90% of the population are followers of the Roman Catholic Church.

== Administrative divisions and politics ==
The island originally used to be a single province. On June 19, 1965, a law passed splitting the province into three: Western Samar, Eastern Samar, and Northern Samar. Since there are three provinces, there are three provincial governments each with a governor. For the House of Representatives, Eastern Samar has one congressional district while Western and Northern Samar has two each, causing the island to have five districts. The Philippines's 9th senatorial district encompassed Samar and Leyte which had two senators representing in the Senate of the Philippines with 24 representatives. The system was abolished in the early 1940s when the country was the Commonwealth of the Philippines.

Provinces in Samar
Name	Capital	Area (ha)	Population (2024)
Western Samar	Catbalogan	604,803	806,179
Eastern Samar	Borongan	466,047	472,683
Northern Samar	Catarman	369,293	645,789

== Economy ==
The island has a major copra industry: of the six provinces in Eastern Visayas, all three of the Samar provinces were placed in the top four based on copra production, just behind Leyte. Western Samar's industry recorded a 6.1 percent increase from 2018 to 2023. The top three industries in the province are food service activities, transportation, and electricity, steam, water, and waste management. As of 2023, the gross domestic product of the province is PHP 61.35 billion. The island has rice and root crops, including sweet potatoes and cassava. Abacá and dairy from native carabaos are found in the island. In Eastern Samar, two house bills were filed to establish two separate coconut oil refineries. Palay and banana crops are also made in the province; agro-industries are actively promoted. Fishery is a major livelihood in Eastern Samar's coastal communities, but it is experiencing a decline. Northern Samar, meanwhile, has rice, corn, vegetables, and abaca. Municipal fisheries and tuna operations are also present in the province. A commercial complex owned by Metro Retail Stores Group was planned to be created in 2019 in Catbalogan from a contract and was opened on August 30, 2024. Samar is separated from the main island shipping routes. Iron ore, made from the southeast portion of the isle, is shipped from General MacArthur. There are also coal, phosphate, and chromite industries. Since Samar has many forests, logging and sawmill operations are also done in the eastern coastal towns. Catbalogan is a major commercial center in the island, serving as an important coastal port with fishing centers.

=== Tourism ===
In 2015, the Samar Tourism Council encouraged tourists to visit attractions in Catbalogan as Governor Sharee Ann Tan held meetings with agency partners and the private sector to further boost tourism in Western Samar. A One Town One Product (OTOP) center from the Department of Trade and Industry (DTI) was launched in Calbayog on June 12, 2024. During the "Benchmarking Tour" held by Eastern Samar officials in Cebu on February 9, 2023, the two provincial governments made a deal to organize a "tourism circuit" to increase tourism in the two provinces. A DTI "Heritage Month Trade Fair" was held by the DTI provincial office of Northern Samar in Robinsons North Tacloban.

== Infrastructure ==
=== Transportation ===
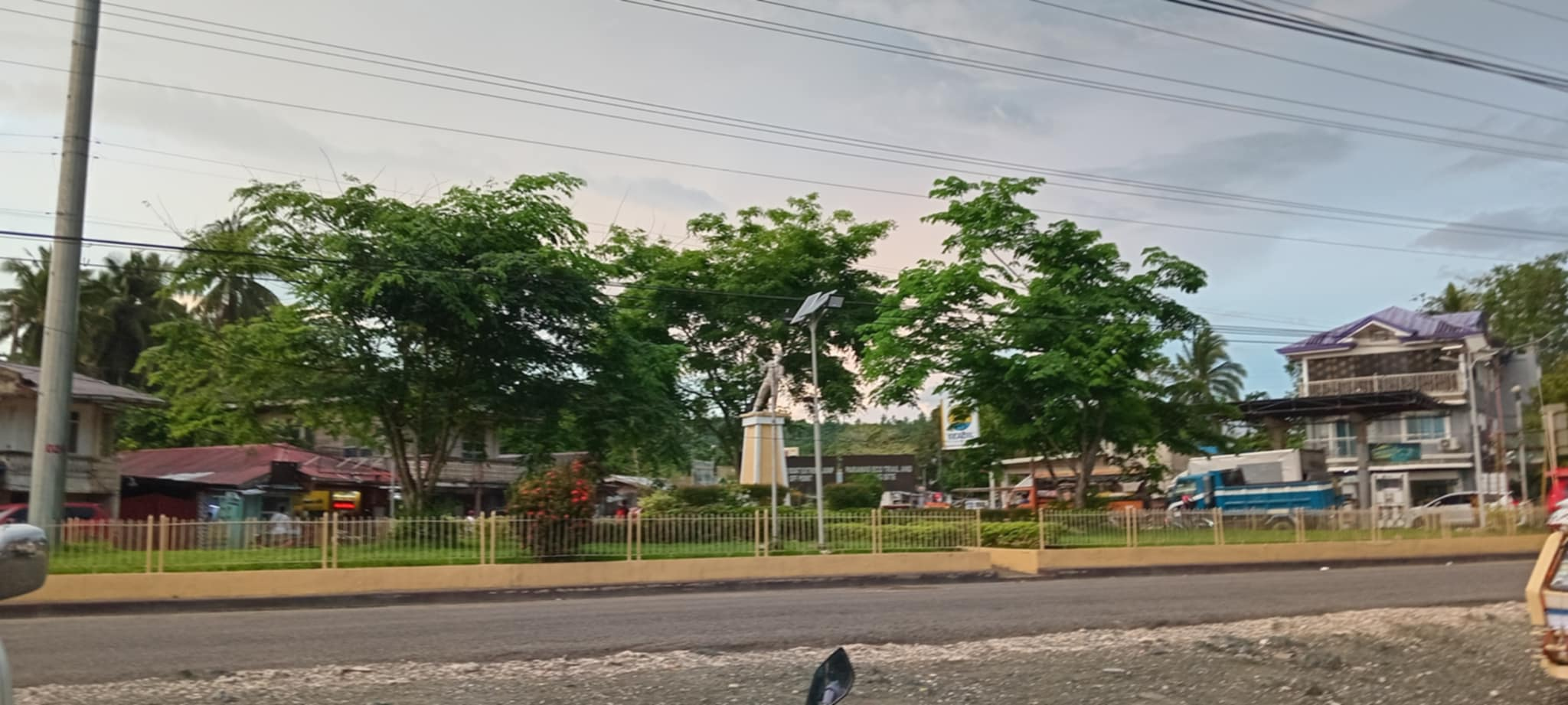
Intersection between the Wright-Taft Highway and the Pan-Philippine Highway in Paranas

A segment of the Pan-Philippine Highway is present in Samar, stretching from Northern Samar to Leyte in the western coast of the isle. The N670 highway traverses through the northern and eastern coasts in the island, stretching through all three provinces, starting and ending from the Pan-Philippine Highway. Two other highways connect from the Pan-Philippine Highway to the N670 highway: the Catarman-Calbayog Road, which originates in Catarman and ends in Calbayog, and the Wright–Taft Road, stretching from Paranas to Taft. Another highway extends from the N670 highway to Guiuan. Four major ports are in the island, namely the Port of Calbayog, the Port of Borongan, the Port of Guiuan, and the Port of San Isidro. A flight route from Cebu to Catarman National Airport was launched on March 4, 2025, serviced by the Philippine Airlines. Two weekly flight routes from Cebu to Borongan Airport were also launched in December 2022, also serviced by the Philippine Airlines. Two airlines service at the Calbayog Airport, namely Philippine Airlines and Cebu Pacific; the former flies to Manila three times a week while the latter flies to Cebu two times a week.

=== Power and telecommunication ===
Eastern Samar's electric distribution utility is the Eastern Samar Electric Cooperative (ESAMELCO). Two electric cooperatives serve Western Samar, namely: the Samar I and Samar II Electric Cooperative (SAMELCO). Northern Samar's electric cooperative is the Northern Samar Electric Cooperative (NORSAMELCO). The Philippines' first tidal plant is planned to be built in Catarman, Northern Samar by a private electricity firm, harnessing currents from the San Benardino Strait. A Singaporean firm invested in a planned wind farm in the borders of the Western and Northern Samar provinces. Solar power projects were planned in two towns in Western Samar. In Taft, Eastern Samar, a hydropower plant is operated, with possibilities of it being a tourist site. The main telecommunication companies serviced in the island are Smart Communications and Globe Telecom. New cell sites from both of the telecommunication operations were planned to be built in Northern Samar. Over 100 cell sites were planned to be built in Northern Samar following a deal with Governor Edwin Ongchuan and PhilTower Consortium, an infrastructure provider.

=== Education ===
Six Department of Education divisions are present in the island: three for each of the provinces, and one each for Borongan, Calbayog, and Catbalogan. Major universities in Eastern Samar include the Eastern Samar State University and four other satellite campuses. In Northern Samar, the University of Eastern Philippines and two other satellite campuses are in the province. For Western Samar, two major universities are placed: the Samar State University with three satellite campuses, and the Northwest Samar State University with one satellite campus. Other local colleges are also in the three provinces. For the Technical Education and Skills Development Authority, three provincial training centers and five schools are placed in the island.

=== Healthcare ===
Eastern Samar has 18 hospitals, most significantly the Eastern Samar Provincial Hospital, a hospital with two levels and 100 beds. Northern Samar has 11 hospitals including their provincial hospital with 100 beds too. Western Samar has 11 hospitals also, with the Samar Provincial Hospital and the Catbalogan Doctors Hospital both with 100 beds. A Senate bill created by Juan Miguel Zubiri was introduced in the 18th Congress of the Philippines, establishing a teritiary level hospital to be known as the Samar Island Medical Center due to the lack of teritiary level hospitals in the island, the nearest being the Eastern Visayas Medical Center. The law was signed on April 19, 2022, and construction started in 2024.

== See also ==
- Negros
- Bohol
