= Domingo Villanueva =

Filipino cyclist (1964–2020)

Personal information
- Born: December 23, 1964 Catbalogan, Samar, Philippines
- Died: April 7, 2020 (aged 55) Catbalogan, Samar, Philippines
- Height: 150 cm (4 ft 11 in)
- Weight: 60 kg (132 lb)

Cycling career
- Sport: Cycling

Domingo Villanueva (December 23, 1964 – April 7, 2020) was a Filipino cyclist. He competed at the 1988 Summer Olympics, and the 1992 Summer Olympics.
