= DYWA =

One Radio (DYWA)
- Catbalogan; Philippines
- Broadcast area: Samar
- Frequency: 101.3 MHz
- Branding: One Radio 101.3

Programming
- Languages: Waray, Filipino
- Format: Contemporary MOR, News, Talk

Ownership
- Owner: Wave Network

History
- First air date: 2017
- Former call signs: DYNA (2017–2020)
- Former frequencies: 92.5 MHz (2017-April 2019)
- Call sign meaning: WAve

Technical information
- Licensing authority: NTC
- Power: 5 kW

One Radio 101.3 (DYWA 101.3 MHz) is an FM station owned and operated by Wave Network. Its studios and transmitter are located at Pier 2, Catbalogan. The frequency is formerly owned by Manila Broadcasting Company.
