= DYMS-AM =

Radio station in Catbalogan, Philippines

Aksyon Radyo Catbalogan (DYMS)
- Catbalogan; Philippines
- Broadcast area: Samar
- Frequency: 1044 kHz
- Branding: DYMS Aksyon Radyo 1044

Programming
- Languages: Waray, Filipino
- Format: News, Public Affairs, Talk
- Network: Aksyon Radyo

Ownership
- Owner: MBC Media Group; (Cebu Broadcasting Company)

History
- First air date: 1956 (in Tacloban); 1976 (in Catbalogan)
- Former frequencies: 1000 kHz (1956–1978)
- Call sign meaning: Modular Sound

Technical information
- Licensing authority: NTC
- Power: 3,000 watts

DYMS (1044 AM) Aksyon Radyo is a radio station owned and operated by MBC Media Group through its licensee Cebu Broadcasting Company. The station's studio and transmitter are located along San Bartolome St., Catbalogan. A number of its programs are simulcast on MSFM 105.3.
