= Saint Mary's College of Catbalogan =

Roman Catholic college in Samar, Philippines

St. Mary's College of Catbalogan
- Dalubhasaang Santa Maria ng Catbalogan (Filipino)
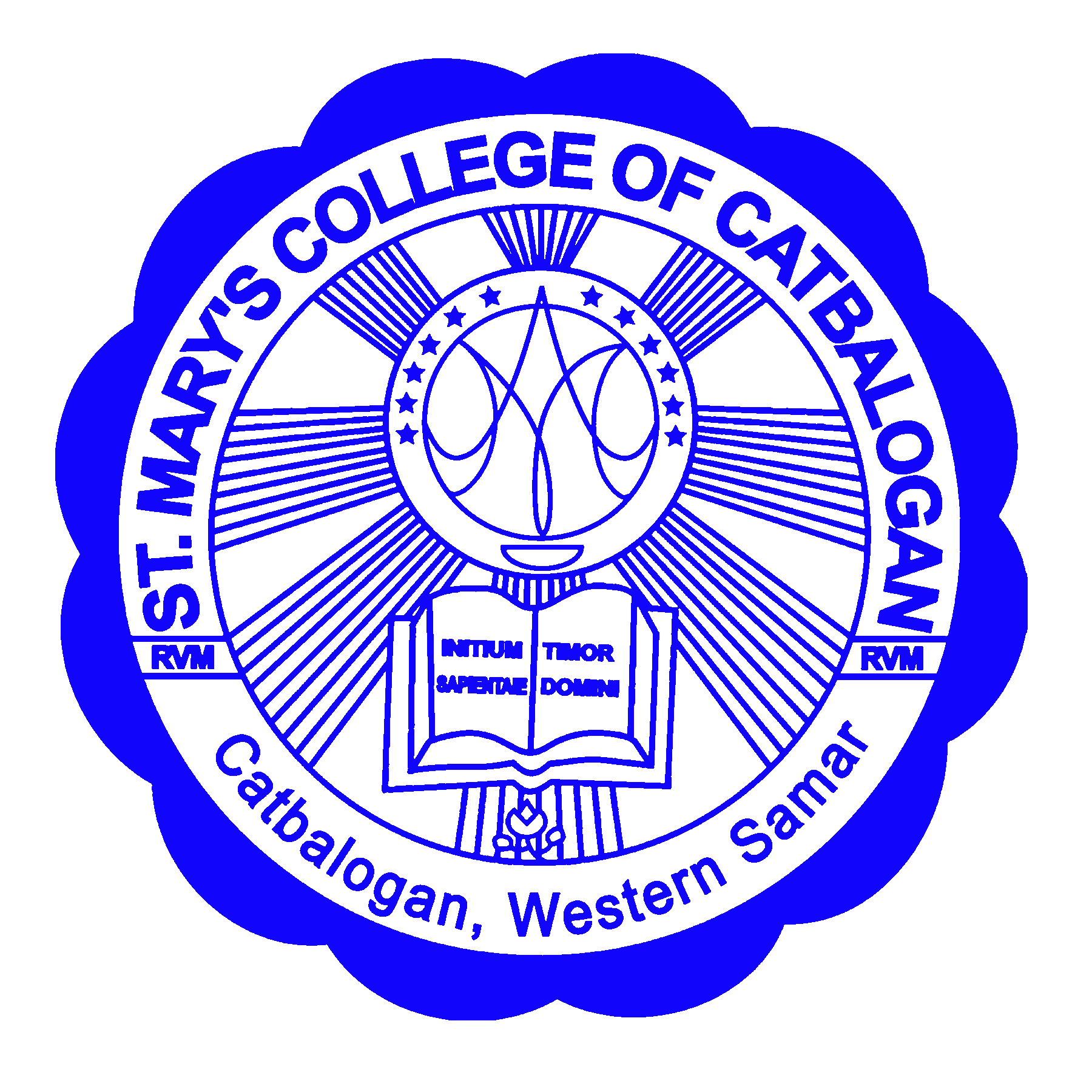
- Former names: Bishop Singzon Institute (1929‑1946); Sacred Heart Junior College (1946‑1948); Sacred Heart College (1948–)
- Motto: Initium Sapientiae Timor Domini (Latin)
- Motto in English: The fear of the Lord is the beginning of wisdom.
- Type: Private Catholic basic and higher education institution
- Established: 1929; 97 years ago
- Founder: Diocese of Calbayog
- Religious affiliation: Roman Catholic (RVM Sisters)
- Academic affiliations: CEAP
- President: Sr.Ma.Rachel B. Bernardo, RVM
- Principal: Sr.Ma.Violeta S. Juanico, RVM (GS/HS Principal)
- Dean: Mrs Remedios Verzosa, MAEd
- Faculty: College - 48 (16 Full-time / 32 Part-time); Grade School - 11; High School - 11
- Administrative staff: 26
- Location: Catbalogan, Samar, Philippines; 11°46′38″N 124°52′51″E
- Campus: Del Rosario St., Corner Mabini Avenue, Catbalogan, Samar, Philippines
- Patroness: Blessed Virgin Mary
- Colors: Royal Blue
- Nickname: Marian
- Website: www.rvmonline.org/smccatbalogan/
- Location in the Visayas Location in the Philippines

Saint Mary’s College of Catbalogan, formerly named Sacred Heart College, is a private Catholic basic and higher education institution run by the RVM (Religious of the Virgin Mary) sisters in Catbalogan, Samar. The school started as a parochial school in 1929. The students are called Marian students for the reason that they possess the Marian-Ignacian identity values of the Most Venerable Mother Ignacia Del Espiritu Santo.

St. Mary's College of Catbalogan is a member of the Catholic Educational Association of the Philippines (CEAP).

== History ==
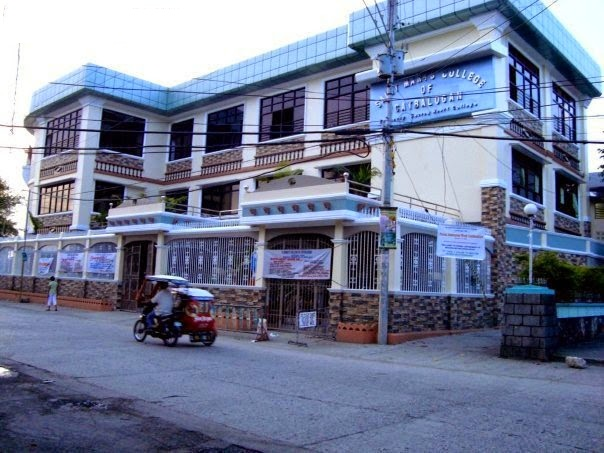
Front of main building of St. Mary's College of Catbalogan

In 1929, the Bishop Singzon Institute was established in Catbalogan, Samar. It was a parochial school named in honor of Bishop Pablo Singzon of Calbiga, the first bishop of Samar and the diocese of Calbayog.

In July 1945, the late Msgr. Miguel Acebedo who was then the bishop of Calbayog, invited the RVM Sisters to take over the management of the institute. The RVM congregation sent two sisters namely Sister Ma. Sousa and Sister Ma. Josefina Contreras with the former being designated as the first superior of the RVM community in Catbalogan. The old convent of the parish of Catbalogan was reconstructed into a dual-purpose building, that of a school and quarters for the RVM sisters.

In July 1946, the name of the institute was changed to Sacred Heart Junior College and later in 1948 it was changed again to Sacred Heart College.

By 1950, the school received government recognition of its high school program and in 1992, it started to offer five undergraduate programs. SMCC currently provides Basic and Higher Education programs. College students can choose four-year courses in the areas of Business Administration, Teacher Education, and Computer Science. Senior High School students, on the other hand, can choose their strands from the Academic and the Technical-Vocational-Livelihood (TVL) tracks. Additionally, Saint Mary's College of Catbalogan has TESDA-accredited courses in Computer Hardware Servicing, Housekeeping, and Programming.
