= DYMS-FM =

Radio station in Catbalogan, Philippines

MSFM (DYMS)
Catbalogan; Philippines
- Broadcast area: Samar
- Frequency: 105.3 MHz
- Branding: MSFM 105.3

Programming
- Languages: Waray, Filipino
- Format: Contemporary MOR, News, Talk

Ownership
- Owner: PEC Broadcasting Corporation

History
- Former frequencies: 102.5 MHz (1990s-2015)

Technical information
- Licensing authority: NTC
- Power: 5,000 watts

DYMS (105.3 FM), broadcasting as MSFM 105.3, is a radio station owned and operated by PEC Broadcasting Corporation. The station's studio is located along #198-B Mabini Ave., Catbalogan. The station simulcasts a number of programs from Aksyon Radyo.
