= Robinsons North Tacloban =

Shopping mall in Tacloban, Philippines

- Location: Tacloban City, Leyte, the Philippines
- Coordinates: 11.240564°N 124.988296°E
- Address: Osmena Rd. Abucay
- Opened: December 24, 2017; 8 years ago
- Developer: Robinsons Malls
- Num. of stores: 121
- Floors: 3
- Website: robinsonsmalls.com/mall-info/robinsons-north-tacloban

Robinsons North Tacloban is the 2nd Robinsons Mall in Tacloban City, after Robinsons Tacloban. The mall is owned by Robinsons Malls, and opened on December 24, 2017.

== History ==
Robinsons North Tacloban was created at the same time as Robinsons Ormoc, located in Ormoc City. Robinsons North is the 2nd Robinsons Mall in Eastern Visayas, the 12th Robinsons Mall in the Visayas archipelago, and the 47th nationwide.

== Features ==
Across three floors, the mall has four cinemas, a supermarket, restaurants and other stores. Unlike Robinsons Tacloban, the mall commonly hosts events, including a Hyundai pop-up store, trade fairs, and events of other types.

The mall has a Gross Floor Area of 57,750 square metres (621,600 sq ft) and a Gross Leasable Area of 26,750 square metres (287,900 sq ft).
