= Catbalogan =

Capital city of Samar, Philippines

Catbalogan Katbalaugan
- Component city
- City of Catbalogan
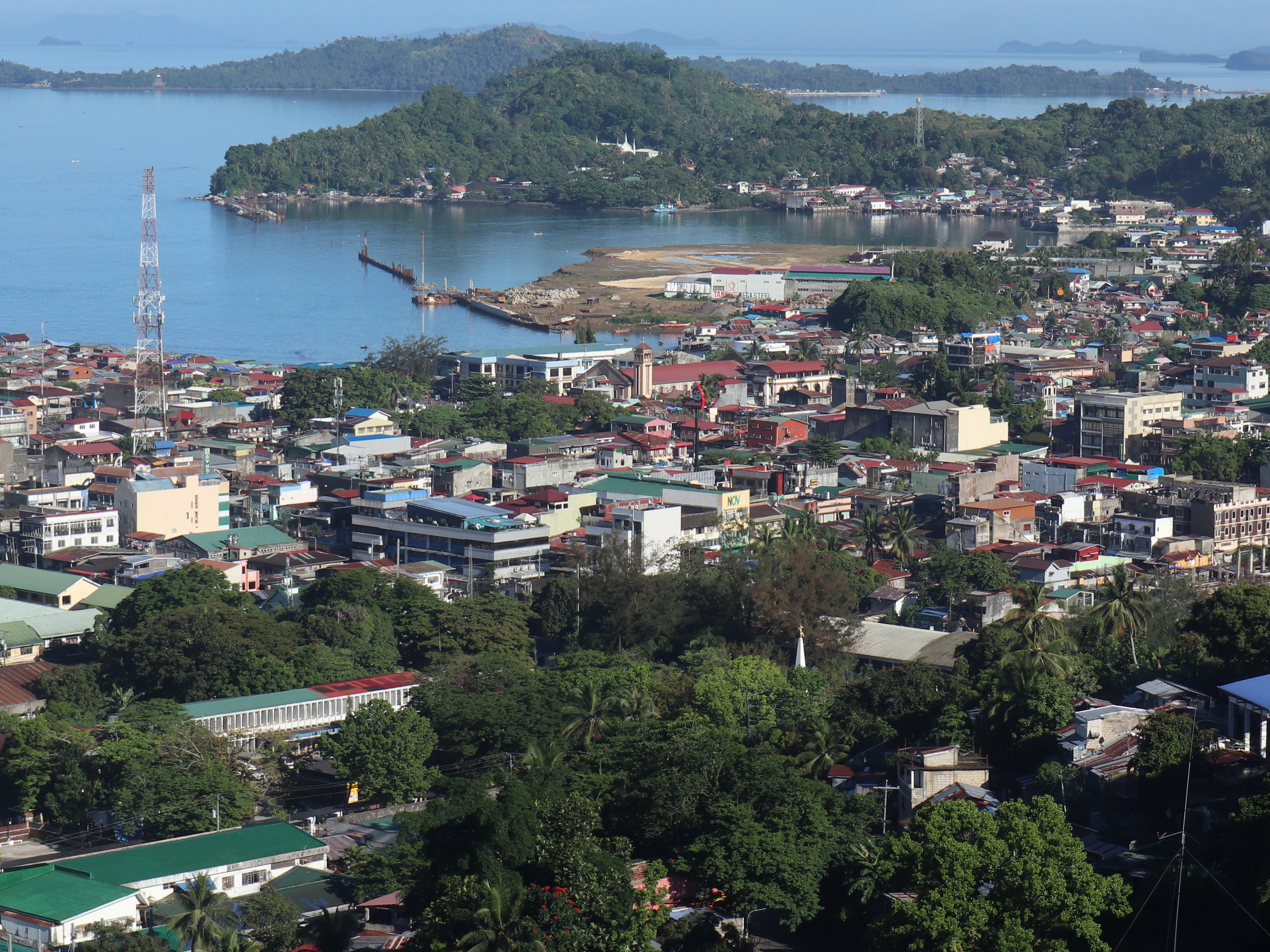
- Catbalogan aerial view

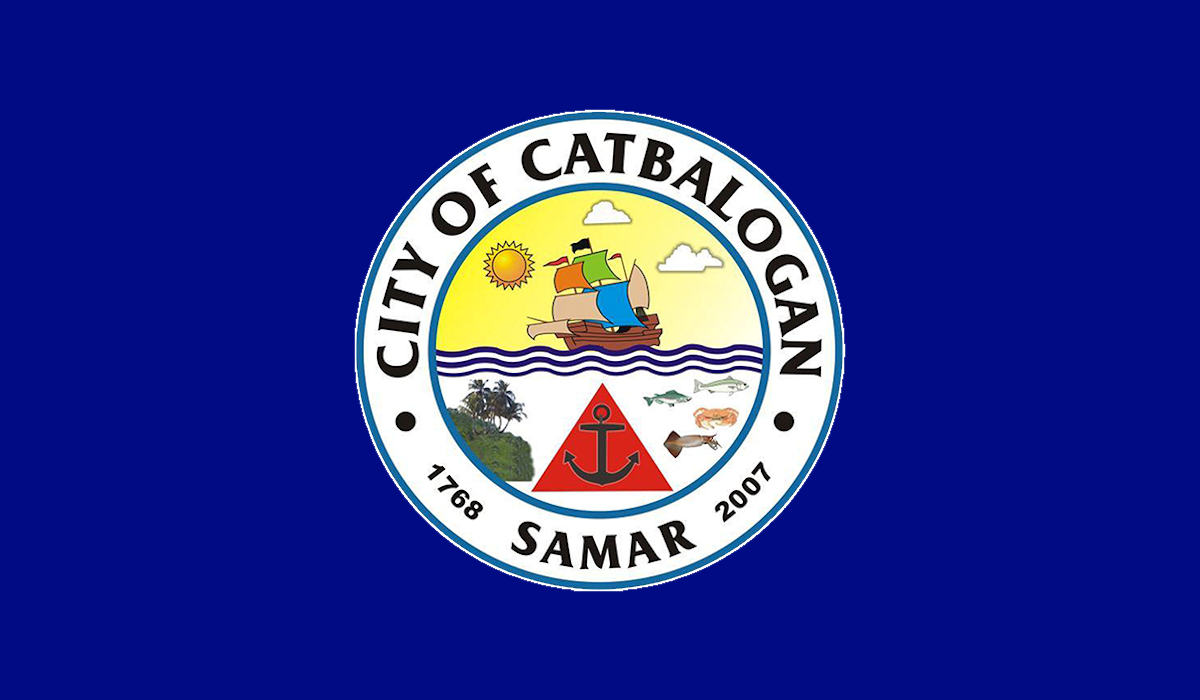
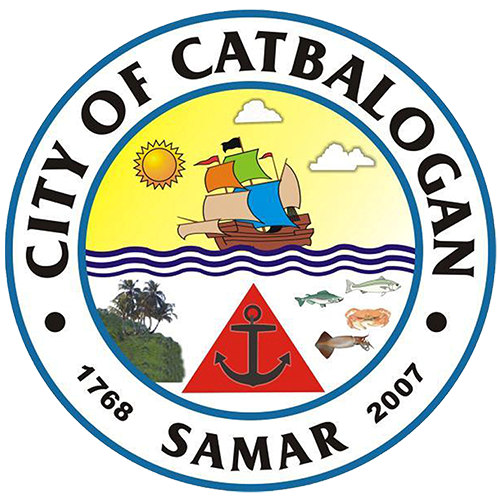
- Flag Seal
- Nicknames: The City of Captivating Contrast, The Heart of Samar Island
- Motto: Catbalogan Higugmaon Ta!
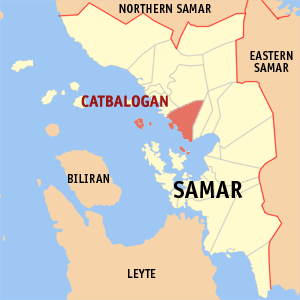
- Map of Samar with Catbalogan highlighted
- Interactive map of Catbalogan
- Location within the Philippines
- Coordinates: 11°47′N 124°53′E
- Country: Philippines
- Region: Eastern Visayas
- Province: Samar
- District: 2nd district
- Founded: October 1596
- Cityhood: June 16, 2007 (Lost cityhood in 2008 and 2010)
- Affirmed Cityhood: February 15, 2011
- Barangays: 57 (see Barangays)

Government
  - Type: Sangguniang Panlungsod
  - Mayor: Dexter Madriaga Uy
  - Vice Mayor: Coefredo "Tekwa" Uy
  - Representative: Reynolds Michael T. Tan
  - City Council: Edward Madriaga Uy; Antonio Bolastig IV; Melvin Perez; Stephany U. Tan; Isko Aquino; Vicente Esteban N. Dacaynos; Ma. Jenny S. Gabon; John James I. Honrales; Gary Piczon; Josephine B. Pescos

Area
  - Total: 274.22 km^{2} (105.88 sq mi)
- Elevation: 93 m (305 ft)
- Highest elevation: 1,331 m (4,367 ft)
- Lowest elevation: 0 m (0 ft)

Population (2024 census)
  - Total: 107,896
  - Density: 393.47/km^{2} (1,019.1/sq mi)
  - Households: 23,107
- Demonym: Catbaloganon

Economy
  - Income class: 3rd city income class
  - Poverty incidence: 26.06% (2023)
  - Revenue: ₱ 1,445 million (2024)
  - Assets: ₱ 2,281 million (2024)
  - Expenditure: ₱ 1,360 million (2024)

Service provider
  - Electricity: Samar 2 Electric Cooperative (SAMELCO 2)
- Time zone: UTC+8 (PST)
- ZIP code: 6700
- PSGC: 086005000
- IDD : area code: +63 (0)55
- Native languages: Waray; Tagalog
- Website: www.catbalogan.gov.ph

Catbalogan, officially the City of Catbalogan (Waray: Siyudad han Catbalogan; Filipino: Lungsod ng Catbalogan), is a component city and capital city of the province of Samar, Philippines. According to the 2024 census, it has a population of 107,896 people.

It is Samar's main commercial, trading, educational, financial and political center. The city is the gateway to the region's three Samar provinces.

Catbalogan's patron saint is St. Bartholomew the Apostle whose feast day is August 24.

The Philippine Army's 8th Infantry Division (Stormtroopers) is based at Camp General Vicente Lukban, Barangay Maulong, Catbalogan City. The camp is named in honor of Gen. Vicente Lukbán, a Filipino officer in Gen. Emilio Aguinaldo's staff during the Philippine Revolution and the politico-military chief of Samar and Leyte during the Philippine–American War.

== Etymology ==
The name "Catbalogan" may have historically come from:

- the Waray terms kat- (prefix) and balaug (a coastal shrub that once thrived along the shores and the Antiao River). Katbalaugan or Kabalaugan translates to "a place where seafarers or fishermen take shelter" as the present-day city was a fishing village that served as a refuge for boats and sailboats seeking protection during the turbulent northwest and southwest monsoons between July and September.
- catbalonga, the local name for the Strychnos ignatii, a large, woody forest vine common in Samar's geography during the 1600s. Jesuit missionaries valued its seeds as a remedy against cholera. The place name likely evolved from catbalongaan ("a place where the catbalonga plant grows")to what early Spanish scribes spelled it as catbaloḡan (substituting nga with ḡa), which later standardized into Catbalogan.

== History ==
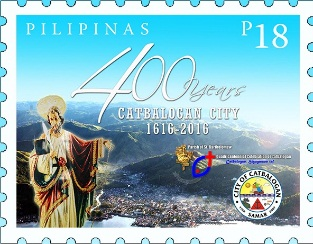
2016 stamp dedicated to the 400th anniversary of Catbalogan

Catbalogan was founded in October 1596 by Spanish Jesuit priests and became the capital of the entire island of Samar. Friar Francisco de Otazo, S.J., who arrived in the Philippines in 1596, founded the Catbalogan Mission and was thus the first missionary to bring the Catholic faith to the people of Catbalogan.

In 1627, Catbalogan was raised to the status of residencia (residence or central house) and among its dependencies were Paranas where, in 1629, Fr. Pedro Estrada actively evangelized the area and Calbiga where he took whiterocks or grey limestone to use as building blocks for its church. The church has some arc-like stone roof that was pasted together to dry on each block, giving an arching force to the side. On October 17, 1768, Catbalogan was ceded to the Franciscans who took over from the Jesuits. The first Franciscan parish priest was Fray Jose Fayo, OFM.

During the early days of Spanish colonization of the Philippines in the 16th century, Samar was under the jurisdiction of Cebu but later was declared a separate province. In 1735, Samar and Leyte were united into one province with Carigara, in Leyte, as the capital. The union, however, did not prove satisfactory. In 1768, Catbalogan became the provincial capital when Samar separated from Leyte and became an independent province. Paranas (with Calbiga) was then separated from Catbalogan as an independent town. In 1882, Jiabong (with Motiong) separated from Catbalogan as an independent town.

On December 31, 1898, during the Philippine Revolution, Gen. Vicente Lukban arrived in Catbalogan and put Samar under his jurisdiction.

On January 27, 1900, the Americans captured Catbalogan during the Philippine–American War (1899–1902). On June 17, 1902, a provincial civil government was established on Samar Island by an act of the Philippine Commission with Julio Llorente of Cebu as the first governor of Samar. On October 23, 1903, the adjacent municipalities of Jiabong and Tarangnan, except for its five barrios south of the Gandara River, were merged with Catbalogan by virtue of Act No. 960. Tarangnan later restored its municipal status on October 31, 1906.

On May 24, 1942, during World War II, Japanese forces landed in Barrio Pangdan on early morning and occupied the capital. On October 28, 1944, American and Filipino forces liberated Catbalogan from the Japanese.

In 1948, the barrios of Jiabong, Jiaan, Malino, San Fernando, Casapa, Camoroboan, Lologayan, Magcabitas, Paglayogan, Dogongan, Bayog, and Malobago were separated to form the municipality of Jiabong.

On June 19, 1965, the Philippine Congress, along with the province's three congressmen, Eladio T. Balite (1st District), Fernando R. Veloso (2nd District) and Felipe J. Abrigo (3rd District), approved Republic Act No. 4221 dividing Samar into three provinces, namely Western Samar, Eastern Samar and Northern Samar, respectively. Catbalogan thus ceased to be the capital of the whole island-province after enjoying the prestige of being the premier town of Samar for 197 years since 1768.

On June 21, 1969, under Republic Act No. 5650, Western Samar was renamed Samar with Catbalogan remaining as the capital.

The greatest calamities to occur in Catbalogan were big fires. The April 1, 1957 conflagration, considered as the most destructive one, caused damage to properties in the amount of thirty million pesos. The next was on May 19, 1969, where damage was estimated at twenty million pesos and the more than century-old Saint Bartholomew Roman Catholic Church was razed to the ground.

=== Cityhood ===
As early as 1960, Catbalogan already agitated to become a city. In 1969, Rep. Fernando P. Veloso sponsored House Bill No. 1867 creating Catbalogan into a city. The bill was being deliberated in the Philippine Senate, but the blaze of 1969 caused it to be shelved. Subsequent efforts were made by Catbalogan political leaders, including former Representative Catalino V. Figueroa, during his term, to make Catbalogan's cityhood dream a reality despite strong and rabid opposition by the League of Cities of the Philippines, particularly Catbalogan City's neighboring Calbayog under the administration of Mayor Mel Senen Sarmiento.

On March 15, 2007, Catbalogan finally attained its cityhood. Under the sponsorship of Senator Alfredo S. Lim and by virtue of Republic Act No. 9391, Catbalogan was converted into a component city known as the CITY of CATBALOGAN following a unanimous vote by the Philippine Senate. Senator Manuel Villar, Jr. (President of the Senate), Congressman Jose De Venecia, Jr. (Speaker of the House of Representatives), Oscar G. Yabes (Secretary of the Senate), Roberto P. Nazareno (Secretary General, House of Representatives) and Gloria Macapagal Arroyo (President of the Philippines) were among its signatories. The residents of Catbalogan overwhelmingly ratified this change through a Comelec plebiscite on June 16, 2007, with over 92% "Yes" votes for cityhood.

However, Catbalogan temporarily lost its cityhood, along with 15 other cities, after the Supreme Court of the Philippines, in a very close 6–5 vote, granted a petition filed by the League of Cities of the Philippines, and declared the cityhood law (RA 9391) which allowed the town to acquire its city status, unconstitutional.

On December 10, 2008, Catbalogan and the other 15 cities affected filed a motion for reconsideration with the court. More than a year later, on December 22, 2009, acting on said appeal, the court reversed its earlier ruling as it ruled that "at the end of the day, the passage of the amendatory law (regarding the criteria for cityhood as set by Congress) is no different from the enactment of a law, i.e., the cityhood laws specifically exempting a particular political subdivision from the criteria earlier mentioned. Congress, in enacting the exempting law/s, effectively decreased the already codified indicators." As such, the cityhood status of Catbalogan was effectively restored.

On August 23, 2010, the court reinstated its ruling on November 18, 2008, causing Catbalogan and 15 cities to become regular municipalities. Finally, on February 15, 2011, Catbalogan became a city again including the 15 municipalities declaring that the conversion to cityhood met all legal requirements.

After six years of legal battle, in its board resolution, the League of Cities of the Philippines acknowledged and recognized the cityhood of Catbalogan and 15 other cities.

== Infrastructure ==
- Imelda Park
- Rizal Monument
- The Obelisk
- S.T.E.P. North
- Regional AFP Installation (Camp Lukban)
- Buri Cargo Airport
- Catbalogan City Diversion Road
- Catbalogan Land Transport Terminal
- Catbalogan Fish and Transport Port

== Provincial Offices ==
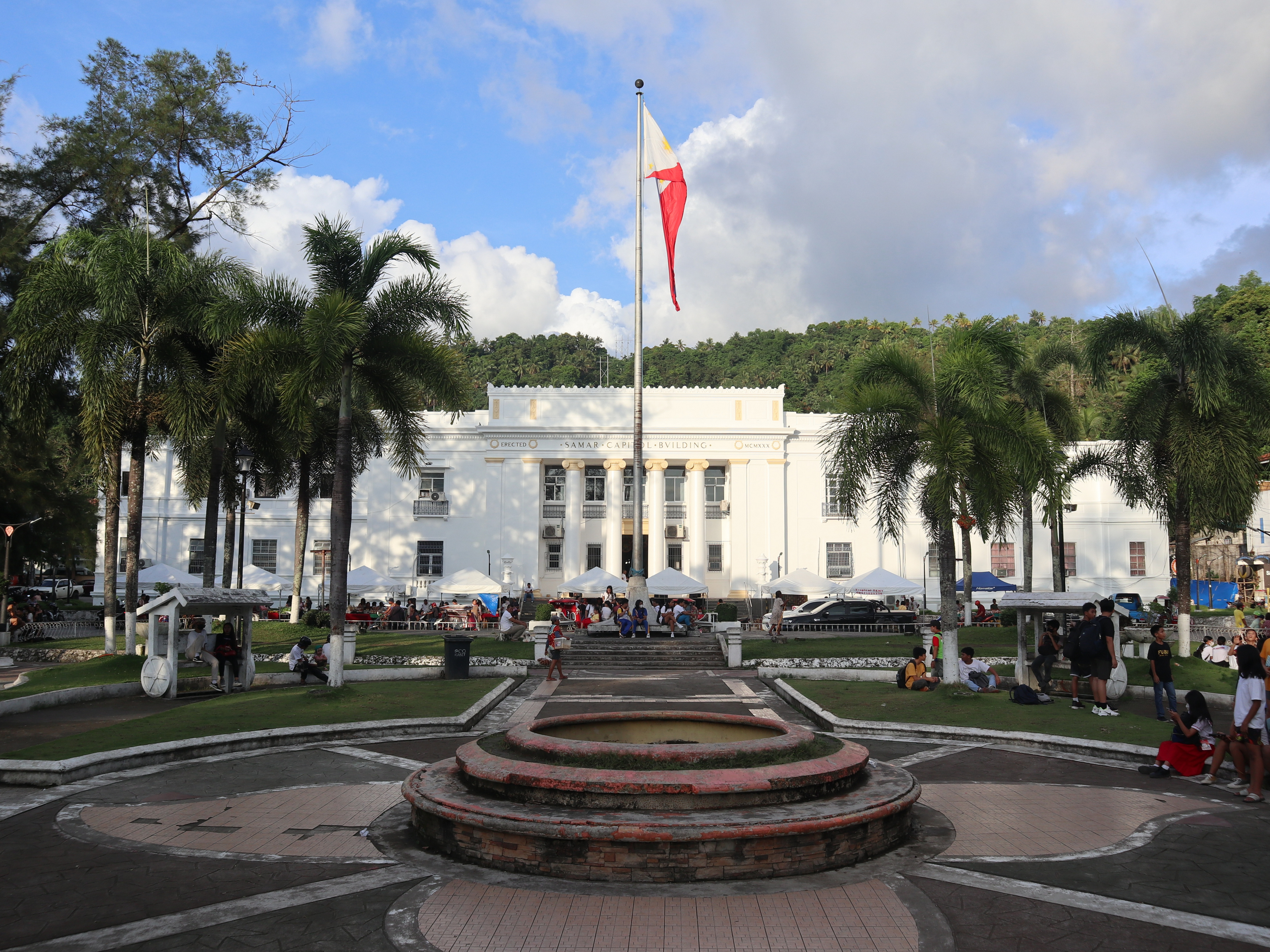
Samar Provincial Capitol Building

- Philippine National Police (PNP Provincial Office)
- Philippine Statistics Office (PSA/former NSO)
- Department of Education DepEd Secondary (former DECS) W?Samar Division) CHED Office?
- Department of Agriculture (DA Pro)
- Department of Health (DOH Pro)
- Department of Environment and Natural Resources (PENRO)
- Department of Justice (DOJ)

== Geography ==
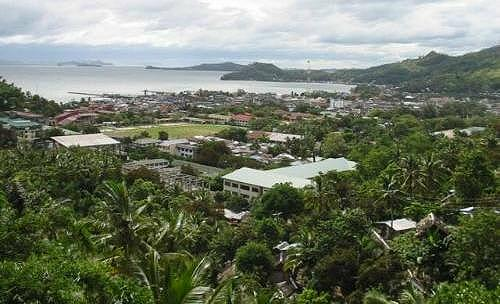
Aerial view of Catbalogan

=== Barangays ===
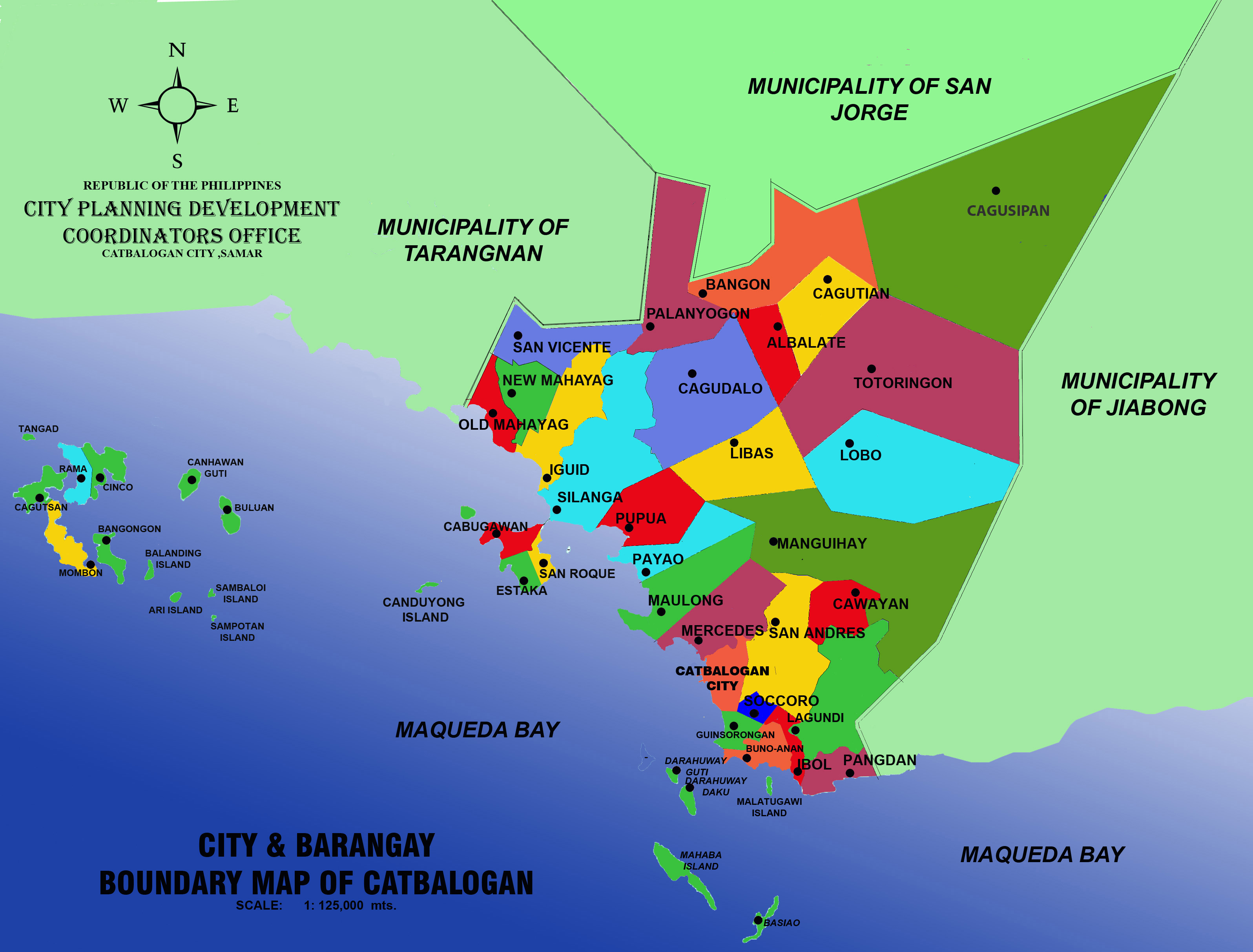
Catbalogan barangay map

Catbalogan City is politically subdivided into 57 barangays. Each barangay consists of puroks and some have sitios.

- Albalate
- Bagongon
- Bangon
- Basiao
- Buluan
- Bunuanan
- Cabugawan
- Cagudalo
- Cagusipan
- Cagutian
- Cagutsan
- Canhawan Guti
- Canlapwas (Poblacion 15)
- Cawayan
- Cinco
- Darahuway Daco
- Darahuway Guti
- Estaka
- Guindapunan
- Guinsorongan
- Ibol
- Iguid
- Lagundi
- Libas
- Lobo
- Manguehay
- Maulong (Oraa)
- Mercedes
- Mombon
- New Mahayag (Anayan)
- Old Mahayag
- Palanyogon
- Pangdan
- Payao
- Poblacion 1 (Barangay 1)
- Poblacion 2 (Barangay 2)
- Poblacion 3 (Barangay 3)
- Poblacion 4 (Barangay 4)
- Poblacion 5 (Barangay 5)
- Poblacion 6 (Barangay 6)
- Poblacion 7 (Barangay 7)
- Poblacion 8 (Barangay 8)
- Poblacion 9 (Barangay 9)
- Poblacion 10 (Barangay 10 : Monsanto Street)
- Poblacion 11 (Barangay 11)
- Poblacion 12 (Barangay 12)
- Poblacion 13 (Barangay 13)
- Muñoz (Poblacion 14)
- Pupua
- Rama
- San Andres
- San Pablo
- San Roque
- San Vicente
- Silanga (Papaya)
- Socorro
- Totoringon

=== Climate ===
Climate data for Catbalogan (1991–2020, extremes 1949–2026)
Month	Jan	Feb	Mar	Apr	May	Jun	Jul	Aug	Sep	Oct	Nov	Dec	Year
Record high °C (°F)	35.4 (95.7)	36.0 (96.8)	37.0 (98.6)	37.6 (99.7)	37.9 (100.2)	38.0 (100.4)	37.1 (98.8)	36.0 (96.8)	36.4 (97.5)	35.9 (96.6)	36.0 (96.8)	35.4 (95.7)	38.0 (100.4)
Mean daily maximum °C (°F)	30.8 (87.4)	31.4 (88.5)	34.1 (93.4)	33.5 (92.3)	33.9 (93.0)	33.4 (92.1)	32.7 (90.9)	32.9 (91.2)	32.8 (91.0)	32.3 (90.1)	31.9 (89.4)	31.2 (88.2)	32.6 (90.7)
Daily mean °C (°F)	26.7 (80.1)	27.0 (80.6)	28.6 (83.5)	28.8 (83.8)	29.5 (85.1)	29.2 (84.6)	28.8 (83.8)	29.1 (84.4)	28.9 (84.0)	28.4 (83.1)	27.8 (82.0)	27.3 (81.1)	28.4 (83.1)
Mean daily minimum °C (°F)	22.7 (72.9)	22.6 (72.7)	23.2 (73.8)	24.1 (75.4)	25.0 (77.0)	25.0 (77.0)	24.9 (76.8)	25.3 (77.5)	24.9 (76.8)	24.4 (75.9)	23.8 (74.8)	23.4 (74.1)	24.1 (75.4)
Record low °C (°F)	16.1 (61.0)	17.0 (62.6)	18.0 (64.4)	17.9 (64.2)	20.8 (69.4)	20.0 (68.0)	21.0 (69.8)	20.0 (68.0)	21.1 (70.0)	20.6 (69.1)	18.9 (66.0)	18.0 (64.4)	16.1 (61.0)
Average rainfall mm (inches)	295.7 (11.64)	208.3 (8.20)	190.9 (7.52)	123.7 (4.87)	179.0 (7.05)	229.8 (9.05)	291.5 (11.48)	195.7 (7.70)	280.3 (11.04)	299.4 (11.79)	292.8 (11.53)	403.9 (15.90)	2,991 (117.76)
Average rainy days (≥ 1.0 mm)	16	12	13	11	12	15	17	12	15	19	19	20	181
Average relative humidity (%)	85	82	81	79	79	81	82	80	81	84	85	86	82
Source: PAGASA

== Transportation ==
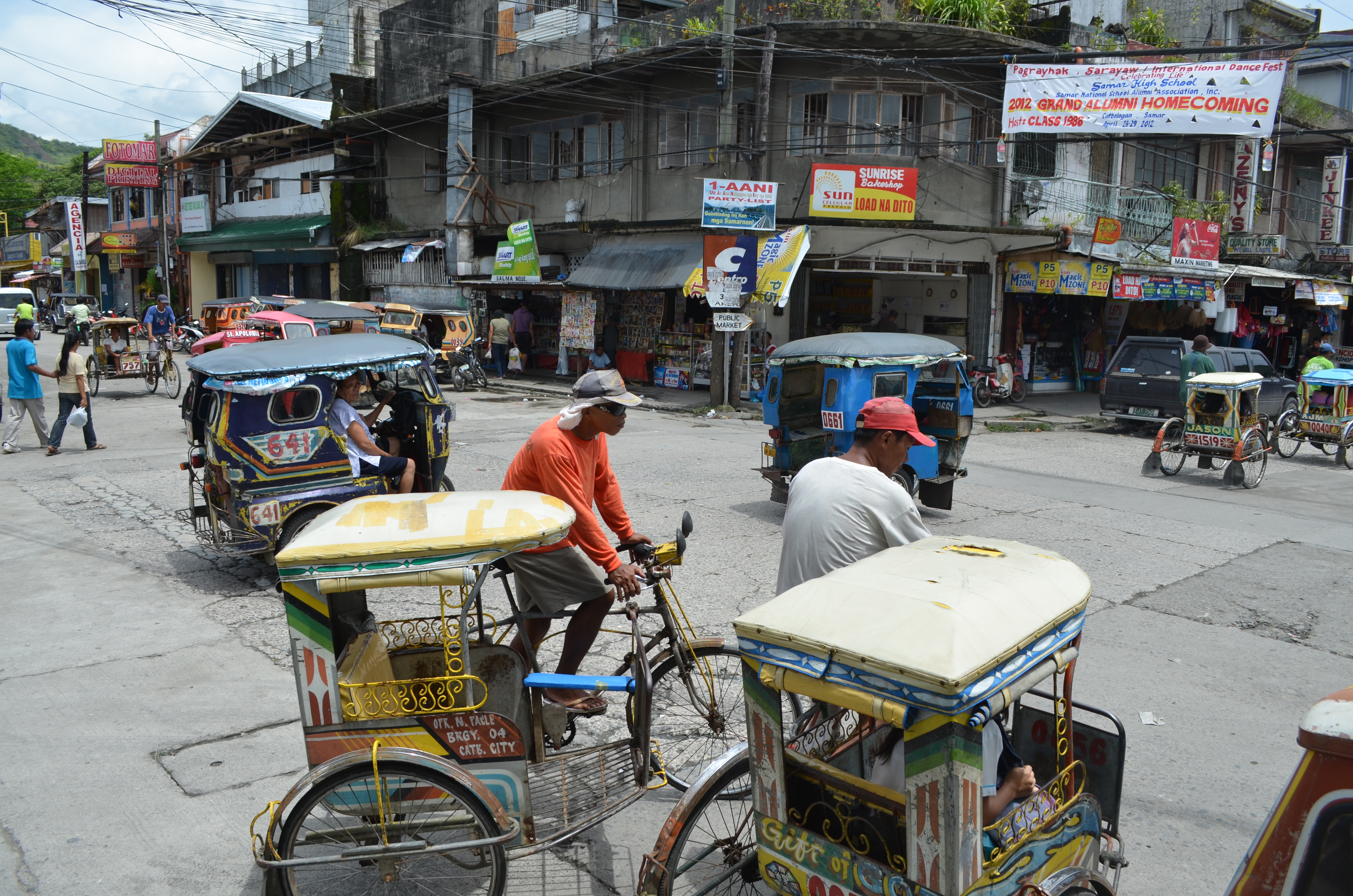
Motorized tricycle and pedicabs are the main transportation mode within the vicinity of the city

For decades, Catbalogan City has served as Samar island's main maritime transport gateway as interisland vessels made its port of call at Catbalogan City Seaport before proceeding to Tacloban City. As the advent of land transport became possible, the interisland maritime transport slowly ceased to operate.

Today, Catbalogan City is a major landport terminal and stopover for interisland bus lines coming and going between Luzon and Mindanao passing through the bridged island of Leyte and Samar.

Catbalogan Airport, also known as Buri Airport, is the main airport of Catbalogan City.

== Demographics ==
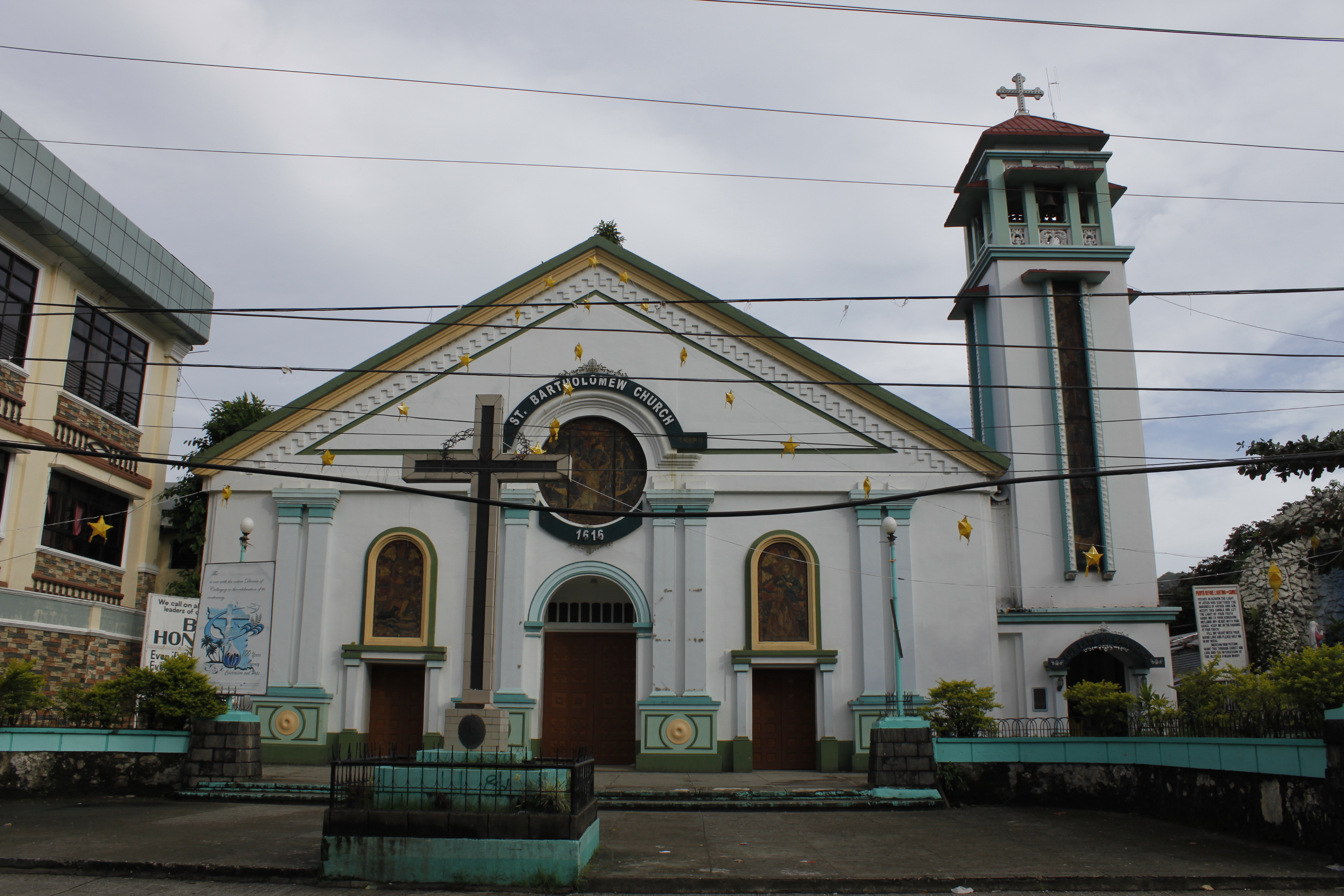
St. Bartholomew Church

Population census of Catbalogan
Year	Pop.	±% p.a.
1903	7,758	—
1918	13,544	+3.78%
1939	26,654	+3.28%
1948	26,839	+0.08%
1960	34,873	+2.21%
1970	49,109	+3.48%
1975	52,384	+1.30%
1980	58,737	+2.31%
1990	70,470	+1.84%
1995	76,324	+1.51%
2000	84,180	+2.12%
2007	92,454	+1.30%
2010	94,317	+0.73%
2015	103,879	+1.86%
2020	106,440	+0.51%
2024	107,896	+0.33%
Source: Philippine Statistics Authority

== Economy ==
Poverty incidence of Catbalogan (%)

Source: Philippine Statistics Authority

== Clinic and Medical Facilities ==
- Catbalogan Puericulture Center
- Samar Provincial Hospital
- Samar Doctors Hospital (Maulong)
- Catbalogan Doctors Hospital (Diversion Road)

== Education ==
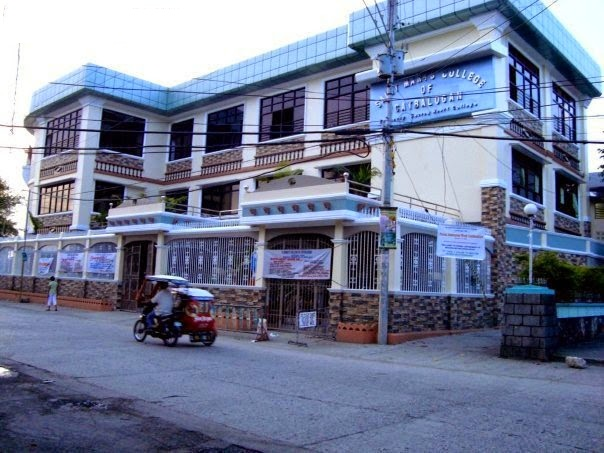
Saint Mary’s College of Catbalogan

=== Preparatory, Primary and Intermediate School ===
- Dorcas Day Care Center
- Chinese Chamber of Commerce Kinder & Primary School
- Catbalogan Central Elementary School

=== Junior & Senior High School ===
- Samar National School
- Silanga National High School
- Catbalogan National Comprehensive High School

=== Regional Junior & Senior High School ===
- Eastern Visayas Regional Science High School

=== Colleges and universities ===
- Saint Mary’s College of Catbalogan
- Samar College
- Samar State University
- Catbalogan City Community College

== Media ==
=== AM Radio Stations ===
- 1044 DYMS - Aksyon Radio Catbalogan (Cebu Broadcasting Company/MBC Media Group)

=== FM Radio Stations ===
- 95.7 Lamrag Radio Catbalogan (Aliw Broadcasting Corporation)
- 101.3 DYWA - One Radio (Wave Network)
- 102.9 DYSY - University Radio (Samar State University)
- 105.3 DYMS - MSFM (PEC Broadcasting Corporation)
- 106.1 - Star Radio (Palawan Broadcasting Corporation)
- 106.9 DYPF - FM Radio (Philippine Collective Media Corporation)

=== Cable and Satellite Providers ===
- D'Leopards Cable TV
- Filproducts Service TV - Catbalogan
- Cignal
- G Sat

== Notable Catbaloganon ==
- Michael Cinco, a Filipino fashion designer based in Dubai. He launched his eponymous fashion line Michael Cinco fashion firm in 2003
- Tom Rodriguez, a Filipino actor, singer, model and TV host
- Tessie Tomas, a multi talented entertainer that made a name for herself as an award winning stand up comedienne, TV host, stage, film actress, and writer
- Sharee Ann Tan, current Governor of the Province of Samar. After being elected as Congresswoman at only 25 years old, she became the youngest member of the House of Representatives
- Andrea Del Rosario, a Filipino actress, beauty queen, model, and politician. She was a former member of the girl group Viva Hot Babes and the Batch 3 of Star Magic
- Yoyong Martirez, was a Filipino basketball player, actor, politician and comedian
- Antonio Nachura, was a Filipino jurist who was an Associate Justice of the Supreme Court of the Philippines. He occupied the position from 2007 until his mandatory retirement 2011
- Bishop Maximiano Tuazon Cruz, ordained priest in 1947 and later became auxiliary bishop of Calbayog before leading the Diocese of Calbayog from 1994 until his retirement in 1999
- Domingo Villanueva, An athlete from Catbalogan who represented the Philippines as an Olympic canoeist in the 1988 and 1992 Games
- Krystal Mejes, a Filipino former child actress under ABS-CBN's Star Magic.
- Nelson “Rey” Bohol, a Filipino animator who was one of the animators of the animated film of Inside Out, Monsters University, Brave, WALL-E, Ratatouille, Cars, and Finding Nemo. He joined Pixar in August 2000.
