= Samar State University =

Public university in Samar, Philippines

- Pamantasang Pampamahalaan ng Samar (Filipino)
- Seal of Samar State University
- Former names: Samar Trade School (1912–1959); Samar School of Arts and Trades (1959–1982); Samar State Polytechnic College (1982–2003)
- Type: Public Non-sectarian Coeducational higher education institution
- Established: 1912; 114 years ago
- President: Dr. Redentor S. Palencia
- Vice-president: Dr. Gina U. Españo (VP for Administration & Finance); Dr. Felisa E. Gomba (VP for Academic Affairs); Dr. Ronald L. Orale (VP for Research & Extension Services); Dr. Ma. Lourdes P. Amante (VP for Student Affairs & Services)
- Location: Catbalogan, Samar, Philippines; 11°47′17″N 124°53′11″E
- Campus: Main: Guindaponan, Catbalogan Satellite: Mercedes Catbalogan; Paranas, Samar; Basey, Samar
- Nickname: SSU
- Sporting affiliations: SCUAA
- Website: www.ssu.edu.ph
- Location in the Visayas Location in the Philippines

Samar State University (SSU) is a public university in the Philippines located in the province of Samar. Its main campus is located in Barangay Guindaponan, Catbalogan. The university has three other external campuses: Mercedes Campus, Catbalogan; Paranas Campus, and Basey Campus.

The university was first known as Samar State Polytechnic College until it was converted into a university with the merger of Wright Vocational School in Paranas, Samar and Samar Regional School of Fisheries based in Catbalogan.

Samar State University is mandated to provide advanced instruction and professional training in the arts, philosophy, social sciences, agriculture, fishery, forestry, science and technology, engineering, education, law, and other related fields, and also to undertake research and extension services, and provide progressive leadership in its area of specialization.

== History ==
The university began in a small one-story small building that only measured 31 meters by 12 meters based on the report by the Philippine Commission. The construction of the building was estimated at ₱19,000 pesos. It was inaugurated in 1912 as Samar Trade School during the incumbency of Governor Vicente Jazmines, serving as the laboratory shop of Samar Provincial High School. It was later converted into an independent secondary trade school. It had it first graduation exercise in 1932.

On June 21, 1959, by virtue of Republic Act No. 2435, the school was converted into Samar School of Arts and Trades, offering a two-year technical curriculum in various vocational areas. It subsequently was given the authority to offer a four-year teacher-education curriculum, Bachelor of Science in Industrial Education (BSIE) and a four-year technical education curriculum, Bachelor of Science in Industrial Technology. It later expanded its programs to evening classes and extension services, and to masters-level instruction.

In 1981, it became one of twenty-three vocational-technical institutes in the Philippines to receive the Asian Development Bank of the Philippines-Vocational Technical (ADV-VOC-TECH) counterpart loan of the MECS in the form of equipment for Automotive, Electronics, Civil and Machine Shop Technology.

In 1982, Samar School of Arts and Trade was renamed as Samar State Polytechnic College. In October 1999, it merged with Samar Regional School of Fisheries - now the College of Fisheries and Marine Sciences.

In 2003, Republic Act 9313 was passed into law which converted Samar State Polytechnic College into a university and renamed it as Samar State University, incorporating into the system Wright Vocational School in Paranas, Samar.

== Campus life ==
There are numerous clubs and organizations based in the main campus and branches of Samar State University.

Among others, the most active organizations is the Social Studies Circle, PICE, Society of English Majors, PIKTAW, etc.

== Athletics ==
The university is an active member of the State Colleges and Universities Athletic Association where it plays in the regional level of competition to advance into the national level of the league. It also participates in the Eastern Visayas Regional Athletic Association as among participatings teams from the province of Samar.

== Campuses ==
- Catbalogan
  - Guindaponan (Main Campus)
  - Mercedes
- Paranas
- Basey
  - College of Agriculture and Forestry

== Colleges ==
The university has seven College departments. It offers a variety of courses from secondary to post-graduate studies.

- College of Graduate Studies
- College of Nursing and Health Sciences
- College of Engineering
- College of Education
- College of Arts and Sciences
- College of Industrial Technology and Architecture
- College of Fisheries and Marine Aquatic Sciences (Mercedes Campus)
- Laboratory School
- Samar Island Institute of Medicine

A satellite campus in Basey will be housing the College of Agriculture and Forestry soon.

== Academic programs offered ==
- College of Graduate Studies
  - PhD in Educational Management
  - PhD in Technology Management (PhDTM)
  - Doctor of Management (DM)
  - Master of Arts (MA)
  - Master of Arts in Teaching (MAT)
  - MA in Education (MAEd)
  - MA in Elementary Education (MAEEd)
  - Master in Technician Education (MTE)
  - Master in Public Management (MPM)
  - Master of Engineering (MEng'g) with majors in Water Resources Engineering and Management (WREM), Construction Engineering and Management (CEM), Civil Engineering (CE), Environmental Engineering (EnE) and Engineering Management (EM)
- College of Engineering
  - Bachelor of Science in Civil Engineering
  - Bachelor of Science in Computer Engineering
  - Bachelor of Science in Electrical Engineering
  - Bachelor of Science in Electronics Engineering
- College of Nursing and Health Sciences
  - Bachelor of Science in Nursing
  - Bachelor of Science in Pharmacy
  - Bachelor of Science in Nutrition and Dietetics
- College of Education
  - Bachelor in Elementary Education
  - Bachelor in Secondary Education with Majors in General Science, English, Math, Physical Education (PE), and Social Studies
  - Bachelor of Science in Industrial Education
  - Bachelor of Science in Technician Education
- College of Arts and Sciences
  - Bachelor of Science in Applied Statistics
  - Bachelor of Science in Information Technology
  - Bachelor of Science in Information System
  - Bachelor of Science in Psychology
- College of Industrial Technology and Architecture
  - Bachelor of Science in Architecture
  - Bachelor of Science in Industrial Technology
  - Bachelor of Technology
  - Competency-Based Vocational Education
- College of Fisheries and Marine Sciences
  - Master of Science in Fisheries Education
  - Bachelor of Science in Marine Engineering
  - Bachelor of Science in Fisheries
  - Bachelor of Secondary Education (Fisheries Education)
  - Bachelor of Science in Marine Biology

== Media ==
Since 2010, the university has its own radio station called University Radio 102.9 (DYSY 102.9 MHz).
