= Paranas =

Municipality in Samar, Philippines

- Municipality
- Municipality of Paranas
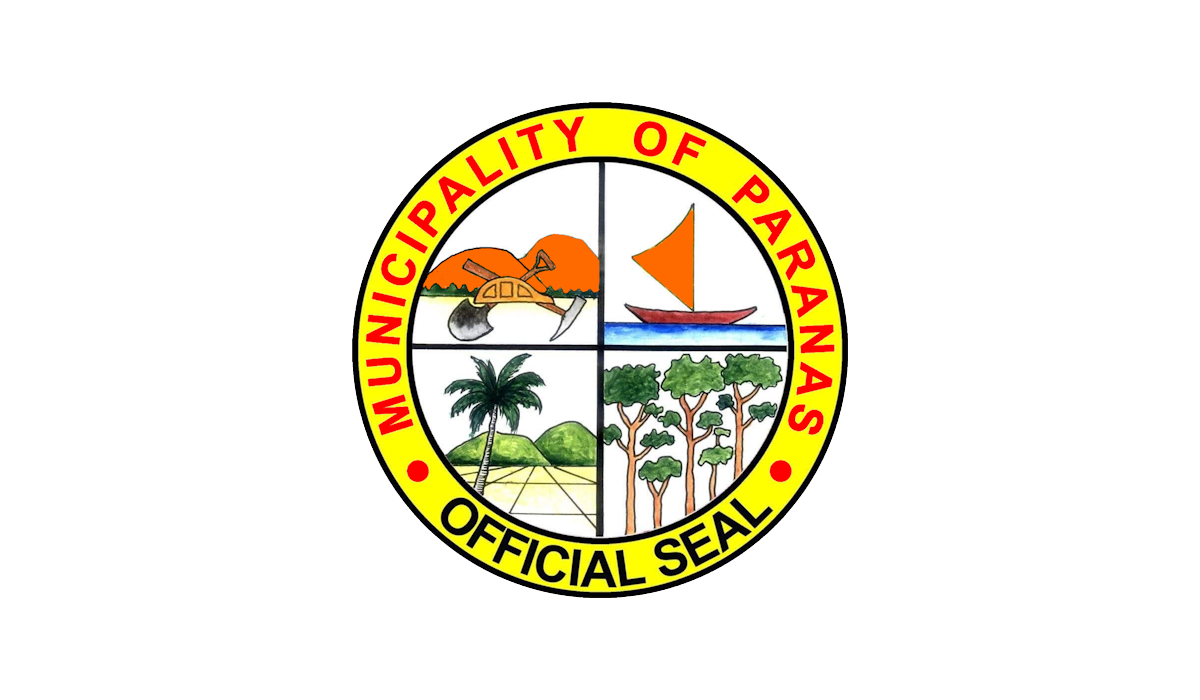
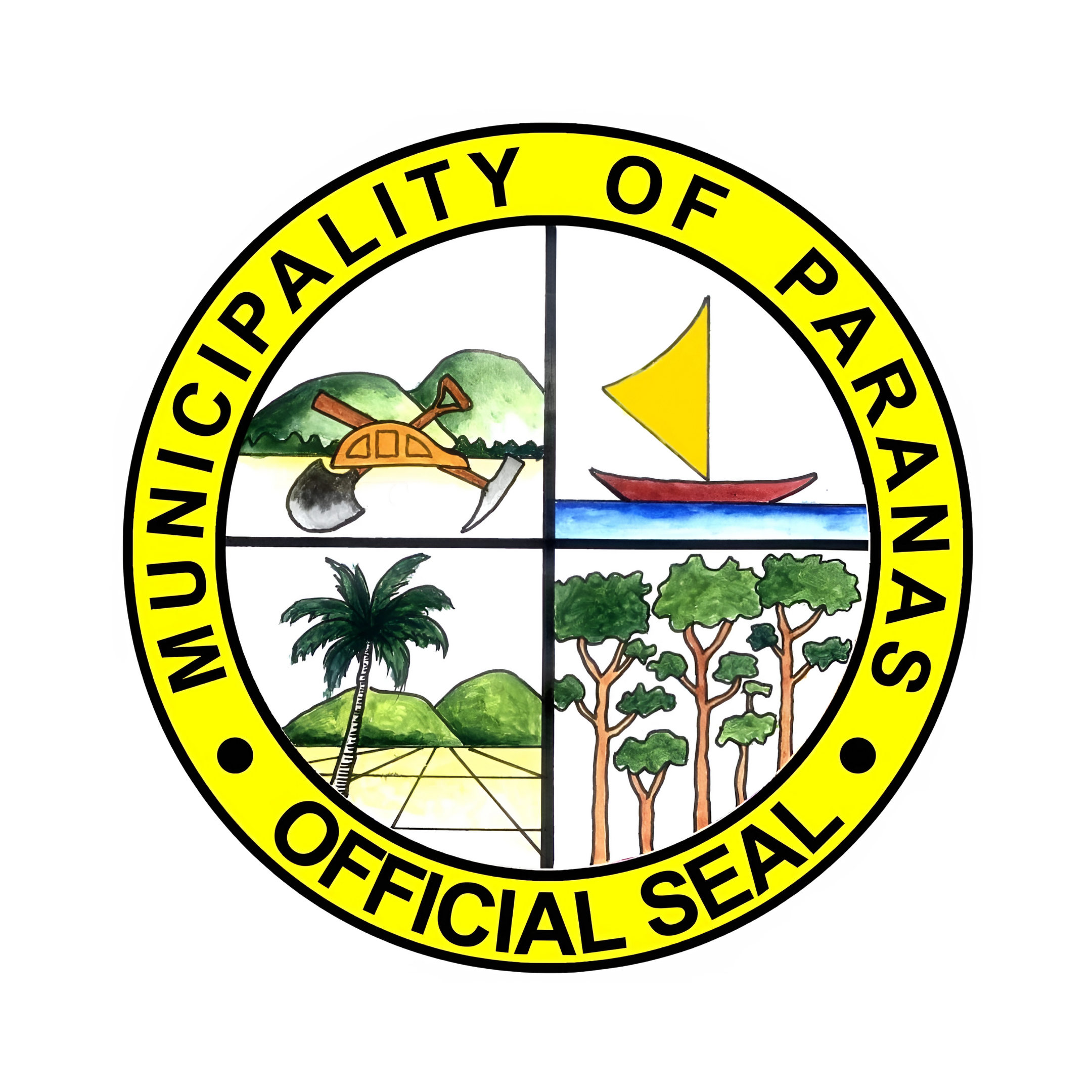
- Flag Seal
- Motto: Paranas Achieve
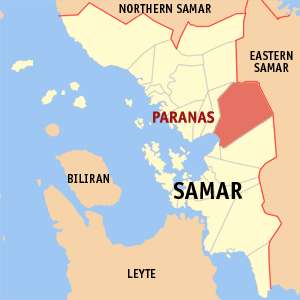
- Map of Samar with Paranas highlighted
- Interactive map of Paranas
- Location within the Philippines
- Coordinates: 11°46′24″N 125°01′20″E
- Country: Philippines
- Region: Eastern Visayas
- Province: Samar
- District: 2nd district
- Barangays: 44 (see Barangays)

Government
  - Type: Sangguniang Bayan
  - Mayor: Elvira Uy Babalcon
  - Vice Mayor: Eunice Uy Babalcon
  - Representative: Reynolds Michael Tan
  - Councilors: List: • Glenn Estera Tan; • Maribeth Hernandez Babalcon; • Nilda Abanag Obor; • Omar Mabansag Cabangunay; • Hector Joseph Fabrigaras Araza; • Agaton Delmonte Gabon III; • Susana Obinguar Cerdeña; • Melwida Cecilio Romero
  - Electorate: 24,414 voters (2025)

Area
  - Total: 556.12 km^{2} (214.72 sq mi)
- Elevation: 50 m (160 ft)
- Highest elevation: 241 m (791 ft)
- Lowest elevation: 0 m (0 ft)

Population (2024 census)
  - Total: 35,281
  - Density: 63.441/km^{2} (164.31/sq mi)
  - Households: 7,324
- Demonym: Paranasnon

Economy
  - Income class: 1st municipal income class
  - Poverty incidence: 31.08% (2023)
  - Revenue: ₱ 309.6 million (2024)
  - Assets: ₱ 904.9 million (2024)
  - Expenditure: ₱ 251 million (2024)
  - Liabilities: ₱ 111.6 million (2024)

Service provider
  - Electricity: Samar 2 Electric Cooperative (SAMELCO 2)
- Time zone: UTC+8 (PST)
- ZIP code: 6716
- PSGC: 0806022000
- IDD : area code: +63 (0)55
- Native languages: Waray; Tagalog

Paranas, officially the Municipality of Paranas (Waray: Bungto han Paranas; Tagalog: Bayan ng Paranas), is a 1st class municipality in the province of Samar, Philippines. According to the 2024 census, it has a population of 35,281 people.

It was formerly known as Wright named after American Governor-General Luke E. Wright.

Many of the townsfolk work or attend school in nearby Catbalogan. Trade is also prevalent with Calbayog farther north.

A part of Paranas is devoted to a nature reserve watershed designated as such by the Department of Environment and Natural Resources.

== History ==
A strip of sand bordering along the coast of the Maqueda Bay, nestling at the foot of a hill which shields it from floods and storms was inhibited by a few natives who engaged in fishing and farming. As time went on, the number of people increased. More and better houses were built and a village was farming. So it attracted many people to trade with the natives and to dwell in it.

The trees along the line of sand were cut down and a street was laid. The increasing inhabitants built nipa houses on both side of the street. As the village expanded the people opened other streets toward the hill.

Shortly after the occupation of the Spaniards in Catbalogan some of them went to Wright, the newly made village. When they reached the village, the tide was low and many of the natives were along the stony coast picking and gathering shellfish and crabs. The banca headed toward the place where the people settled. One of the Spanish Officials asked for the name of the place or the village in Spanish language. The ignorant native looked boastfully at the over tall stranger. Thinking that the Spaniard was asking for the name of slippery rock which the Spaniard was apparently looking at, the native answered “Palanas”, name of the rock. The Spaniard then pronounced the word “Paranas” instead of palanas and recorded it as the name of the village. They went ashore and organized the village government and appointed its officials under the banner of Spain.

The Spanish sovereignty over the village had greatly inspired the natives. The doctrine of Christianity was introduced and the people willingly and readily accepted and believe it. Through the course of time, the village grew to the end and be one of the progressive towns along the shore of the Maqueda Bay. A Catholic church and a convent were erected and a thick high wall around the church site was constructed.

When America succeeded in overthrowing Spain during the Spanish–American War, the Philippines was ceded to her. Paranas was at the height of her glory at that time. In 1890 during the Philippine–American War the Paranasnon were one of these who showed strong resistance against the American Forces. American troops headed by General Curry came sudden and subdue the Revolutionist here in Paranas. Most of the native fled to the mountain. The revolutionist fought hard and bravely. Many American people died here. In one of these encounters General Curry was lost I the midst of the forest where they were the old people of Paranas or Wright.

General Curry had been in the wilderness for three days and the man who saved him was taken to the United States with him. Due to the hospitality and kindness of the people of Paranas one of General Curry's savior. General Curry recommended the changed of the name of the town Paranas to Wright in honor of the governor General of the Philippines at that time. Because of its location the town of Wright engage in two main industries:

1. Farming
2. Fishing

They engage in farming because on the eastern part of the areas to town are areas of land on the western part in a fertile ground for fishing. The wide of land are converted into rice fields both for upland and lowland rice. One unique kind of rice that is so anosmatic and palatable to the town to eat is the famous “Kalinayan” an upload rice that is favorable to most of the town folks. Aside from rice, fruits, vegetables; root cops are so cheap and abundant that people of Wright used to sell to other places. The biggest market of these products are the capital town of Catbalogan and Bagacay, the set of the copper mine is Samar

From the Maqueda bay, fresh fish of different kinds are so plentiful that people who engage in fishing are able to earn enough to support their families. Aside from the fish, sea shells can also be gathered in the location. The famous bahong, sabuad, baliad, ponao, saringa, bocawil, and others have an abundant supply, with more than enough for the town's consumption.

The people of Wright are lovers of socials and they love dance the Curracha. The Summer time Club is a town organization composed of both the married and single group that usually hold its annual affair very beginning of the summer vacation.

During the American period, Paranas was renamed by the new administrators to Wright, in honour of General Wright. However, locals retained and still use the name Paranas. It absorbed the former town of San Sebastian. In 1950, the barrios of San Sebastian, Jitaasan, Dolores, Camanjagay, Bontod, Campidasa, Campiyak, Maslog, Balogo, Maropangpang, Binongtoan, and Bolwan was re-created as a town.

In 1955 the sitio of Madalanot was converted into a barrio.

== Geography ==
=== Barangays ===
Paranas is politically subdivided into 44 barangays. Each barangay consists of puroks and some have sitios.

- Anagasi
- Apolonia
- Bagsa
- Balbagan
- Bato
- Buray (Binogho)
- Cantaguic
- Cantao-an
- Cantato (Canturab)
- Casandig I
- Concepcion
- Jose Roño
- Cawayan
- Lawaan I
- Lipata
- Lokilokon
- Mangcal
- Maylobe
- Minarog
- Nawi
- Pabanog
- Paco
- Pagsa-ogan
- Pagsanjan (Pagsan-an)
- Patag
- Pequit
- Poblacion 1
- Poblacion 2
- Poblacion 3
- Poblacion 4
- Poblacion 5
- Poblacion 6
- Salay
- San Isidro
- Santo Niño
- Sulopan
- Tabucan
- Tapul
- Tenani
- Tigbawon
- Tula
- Tutubigan
- Casandig II
- Lawaan II

=== Climate ===
Climate data for Paranas, Samar
Month	Jan	Feb	Mar	Apr	May	Jun	Jul	Aug	Sep	Oct	Nov	Dec	Year
Mean daily maximum °C (°F)	27 (81)	28 (82)	28 (82)	30 (86)	30 (86)	30 (86)	29 (84)	29 (84)	29 (84)	29 (84)	28 (82)	28 (82)	29 (84)
Mean daily minimum °C (°F)	22 (72)	22 (72)	22 (72)	23 (73)	24 (75)	24 (75)	24 (75)	24 (75)	24 (75)	24 (75)	23 (73)	23 (73)	23 (74)
Average precipitation mm (inches)	114 (4.5)	81 (3.2)	94 (3.7)	81 (3.2)	119 (4.7)	192 (7.6)	186 (7.3)	158 (6.2)	167 (6.6)	185 (7.3)	202 (8.0)	176 (6.9)	1,755 (69.2)
Average rainy days	18.6	14.7	16.8	17.8	22.3	25.9	27.5	26.2	26.6	27.0	24.6	22.3	270.3
Source: Meteoblue

=== Bruna Fabrigar ===
Bruna Fabrigar - (locally known as Bunang) is a local hero in Paranas, Samar and one of the brave and courageous leaders of the famous Pulajanes Movement during the Philippine–American War.

== Demographics ==
Population census of Paranas
Year	Pop.	±% p.a.
1918	12,847	—
1939	17,716	+1.54%
1948	16,717	−0.64%
1960	16,267	−0.23%
1970	17,352	+0.65%
1975	19,386	+2.25%
1980	21,556	+2.14%
1990	22,702	+0.52%
1995	24,235	+1.23%
2000	27,926	+3.09%
2007	27,820	−0.05%
2010	29,327	+1.94%
2015	30,557	+0.79%
2020	32,374	+1.22%
2024	35,281	+2.09%
Source: Philippine Statistics Authority

== Economy ==
Poverty incidence of Paranas (%)

Source: Philippine Statistics Authority

== Government ==
=== List of former chief executives ===
- Paciano Babarano—1880 - 1882
- Marcelo Gabon ----- 1883 - 1885
- Galo Baclayon ----- 1885 - 1888
- Nepomoceno Pacoli - 1889 - 1892
- Francisco Dabuet—1893 - 1896
- Pablo Sison ------- 1897
- Sixto Pacoli ------ 1898 - 1900
- Simon Davantes ---- 1901 - 1902
- Victorino Tuazon ---1902 - 1903
- Francisco Pacoli—1904 - 1906
- Cipriano Ponferado - 1906 - 1909
- Charles Shauger --- 1909 - 1912
- Simon Davantes ---- 1912 - 1915
- Pedro Dabuet ------
- Cecilio Sison ----- 1915 - 1918
- Angel Rosales ---- 1919 - 1922
- Alejandro Sison --- 1925 - 1992
- Graciano Babali --- 1931 - 1934
- Isidro Tizon ------ 1934 - 1939
- Hilario Abalos ---- 1939 - Japanese occupation
- Cecilio Sison ----- 1946 - 1947
- Jose Tanseco ------ 1948 - 1948

== Culture ==
=== Local beliefs ===
Townspeople living off the coast of Paranas believe turtles that come to die ashore are omens of danger, harbingers of typhoons and ocean-related accidents. The old fisherfolk dare not touch nor disturb these docile creatures because of this superstition. Green sea turtles and Loggerhead turtles frequent some coves off Samar to lay eggs or wade near the shallow areas to explore. Gigantic Loggerhead turtles are especially rare visitors even in the yesteryears. When they come ashore and do not lay eggs, tears flow from their eyes like humans. They would then die as the blazing sun rises and their bodies are scorched. Afterwards, fishermen go missing at sea, typhoons arrive, bancas capsize or cargo ships sink. Residents attest turtles came to die on their shores when the Doña Paz sank causing thousands of people to drown to their deaths.

== Transportation ==
The Pan-Philippine Highway traverses Paranas.

Domestic air travelers prefer to return to Paranas via dominant Tacloban's Daniel Z. Romualdez Airport due to the length of the runway and the accessibility of land transportation. Other options include the improved Calbayog Airport and the less utilized Catbalogan Airport (which is only ideal for smaller aircraft). International air travelers may also reach Paranas via Manila, Cebu or Davao en route to Tacloban. In the next few months, Tacloban's airport is being readied for direct international flights.

== Notable personalities ==
- Paciano Babarano (1880-1882) - the first mayor of the town of Paranas.
- Mr. John Miller (1882-1900) - the first American Teacher in Paranas
- Mr. Charles Shougger - the first President in the Poblacion of Paranas during the American time. He built the Gabaldon Building in Wright South Elementary School and he is also considered the first American teacher in Paranas.
- Mauricio Gabon - the first Filipino teacher during the American time in the town.- He reaches up to Grade Three and assigned as the first male teacher in town in the year 1902.
- First female teachers who taught in the town and have an educational attainment of grade four.
- Judge Angel Rosales - was the first Corporador (Judge) in the town. He built the public market in the town.
- Dr. Norberto Betong Rosales - the first rural doctor assigned in the town.
- Mayor Cecilio Sison - He built the famous Rizal monument of the town.
- Mayor Fortunato Gabon - He make his own street which called through his name the Gabon Boulevard.
