= Eastern Visayas Medical Center =

Government hospital in Tacloban, Philippines

Geography
- Location: Tacloban, Leyte, Eastern Visayas, Philippines
- Coordinates: 11°15′06″N 125°00′17″E

Organization
- Funding: Government hospital
- Type: tertiary level teaching and training hospital

Services
- Beds: 500

History
- Opened: July 16, 1916 (Leyte Provincial Hospital as the oldest merged entity); June 18, 1966 (Speaker Daniel Z. Romualdez Memorial City Hospital as the surviving entity)

Links
- Website: evrmc.doh.gov.ph

The Eastern Visayas Medical Center (EVMC) is a tertiary level teaching and training government hospital in the Philippines.

On June 18, 1966, the then Speaker Daniel Z. Romualdez Memorial City Hospital was established as a general hospital in Tacloban with service capacity of one hundred beds. On July 22, 1972, the Speaker Daniel Z. Romualdez Memorial City Hospital became the surviving entity when the Leyte Provincial Hospital and the Tacloban City Hospital were merged with it. During this time, its capacity was increased to two hundred fifty beds. It was renamed as Tacloban City Medical Center on November 12, 1986 and again renamed as Eastern Visayas Regional Medical Center (EVRMC) on March 24, 1992. In 2009, it was authorized by the national law to expand into a five hundred bed hospital. In 2021, the word "regional" was dropped from its name and its service capacity was further increased to 1500 beds.
