= Father Saturnino Urios University =

Roman Catholic university in Butuan, Philippines

- Pamantasang Padre Saturnino Urios (Filipino)
- Seal
- Former names: Butuan Parochial School (1901–1939); Father Urios High School (1939–1950); Father Urios College (1950–1970); Urios College (1970–2006)
- Motto: Luceat Lux Vestra (Latin)
- Motto in English: Let Your Light Shine
- Type: Private, research, coeducational
- Established: October 21, 1901
- Religious affiliation: Roman Catholic Church
- Academic affiliations: ACEA, PAASCU, CEAP
- Chairman: Most Rev. Bp. Cosme Damian R. Almedilla
- President: Rev. Fr. Randy Jasper C. Odchigue, S.Th.D.
- Vice-president: Rev. Fr. James Michael M. Abellanosa (VP for Administrative & Student Affairs); Arlyn M. Floreta, Ph.D. (VP for Academic Affairs)
- Principal: Donna F. Espuerta, MAELT (Grade School, Junior High School, ABP Morelos Senior High School)
- Campus: Main (Undergraduate and Postgraduate): Urban Corner San Francisco St. and J.C. Aquino Avenue, Brgy. Sikatuna, Butuan City, Philippines 08°56′52.7″N 125°32′30.4″E Abp. Morelos Campus (Basic Education): Suburban Brgy. Libertad, Butuan City, Philippines
- Newspaper: The Urian Publication
- Alma Mater song: "The FSUU Hymn"
- Colors: Urian Blue; White; Green; Yellow
- Nickname: Urians
- Website: www.urios.edu.ph
- Location in Mindanao Location in the Philippines

Father Saturnino Urios University (Filipino: Pamantasang Padre Saturnino Urios), also referred to by its acronym FSUU, is a private Roman Catholic coeducational basic and higher education institution run by the Diocese of Butuan in Butuan, Philippines. It offers preschool, elementary, junior and senior high school, and college (undergraduate and graduate) courses. It was founded by Father Saturnino Urios, SJ, a Spanish Jesuit missionary, in 1901.

== History ==
Father Saturnino Urios University (FSUU) traces its origins to October 21, 1901, when Rev. Father Saturnino Urios, a Spanish member of the Society of Jesus (SJ), established a boys' school in Butuan. The school, a low brick structure adjacent to the old Butuan church, was founded in response to public school laws that prohibited teachers from discussing religion. Fr. Urios, along with other Spanish clergy, sought to provide free Catholic education that fostered both intellectual and moral development. Despite facing opposition from American non-Catholic soldiers, who also served as public school teachers, Fr. Urios remained steadfast in his commitment to Catholic education in Butuan.

By 1927, as government regulation over public and private education intensified, Fr. Jose Buxo, the last Spanish Jesuit priest in Butuan, pursued official recognition for the parochial school as an elementary institution. The Jesuits faced persistent financial difficulties in maintaining the school. The expulsion of Spanish priests by the American military government in the early 1900s led to the Vatican commissioning the Missionaries of the Sacred Heart (MSC), a religious order, to serve in Surigao, which at the time included Butuan. The first MSC missionaries arrived on December 8, 1908.

Following the death of Fr. Urios on October 27, 1916, the Jesuits continued to manage the elementary school. However, on December 8, 1935, Dutch MSC priests, previously stationed in Surigao, assumed leadership of Catholic education in Butuan, replacing the remaining Spanish Jesuits. Among their early contributions was the reconstruction of the Church of Butuan and the Butuan Parochial School in 1937.

In 1939, the MSC Fathers expanded the institution by opening a high school department and renaming it Father Urios High School in honor of its founder. The first principal of the high school, Rev. Fr. Antonius Jansen, MSC, was appointed in April 1941. However, the onset of World War II, marked by the Japanese invasion of the Philippines on December 8, 1941, disrupted normal operations. Following the war, reconstruction efforts commenced, and Fr. Jansen resumed his role as principal in 1945. Under his leadership, the elementary building was rebuilt, and a new wooden high school structure was constructed adjacent to the convent.

On July 1, 1947, Fr. Jansen secured government recognition for Fr. Urios High School, where he also became the first rector. The first batch of high school graduates completed their studies in 1948. That same year, Miss Aurora Rosales, a Butuan native, was appointed principal of the elementary school, a position she held until 1979.

=== Expansion into higher education ===
Between 1947 and 1954, under the rectorship of Rev. Fr. Gerald Tangelder, MSC, the institution expanded its academic offerings with the establishment of a college department in 1950. This development prompted another renaming, transforming the school into Urios College. The college initially offered four government-recognized programs: Associate in Arts (AA), Associate in Commercial Science (ACS), College of Education, and Junior Normal (ETC).

By 1954, during the term of Rev. Fr. Venancio Portillo, the only Filipino MSC rector, the college secured government recognition for four-year programs, including Bachelor of Arts (AB), Bachelor of Science in Commerce (BSC), and Bachelor of Secondary Education (BSE). Subsequent rectors further expanded the curriculum. Under Rev. Fr. Francisco Van Dijk, MSC (1955–1959), the Bachelor of Elementary Education (BEE) and a Certificate in Secretarial Studies were added. Rev. Fr. Henry Van Engelen, MSC (1959–1960, 1963), facilitated a 30% increase in the school's income through parent-teacher dialogues. Rev. Fr. George Haggenburg, MSC, rector from 1960 to 1963 and again from 1964 to 1971, introduced initiatives such as the Study Now, Pay Later program and faculty development scholarships. He also oversaw the construction of a concrete college building to accommodate increasing enrollment.

In 1970, the establishment of the Diocese of Butuan led to Msgr. Carmelo D.F. Morelos being appointed as its first bishop. Urios College became a diocesan school under his supervision. On December 28, 1970, it was formally registered as a non-stock, non-profit corporation under the name Urios College, Inc. The faculty development program initiated during this period provided scholarships that enabled many educators to become administrators.

=== Filipinization and further growth ===
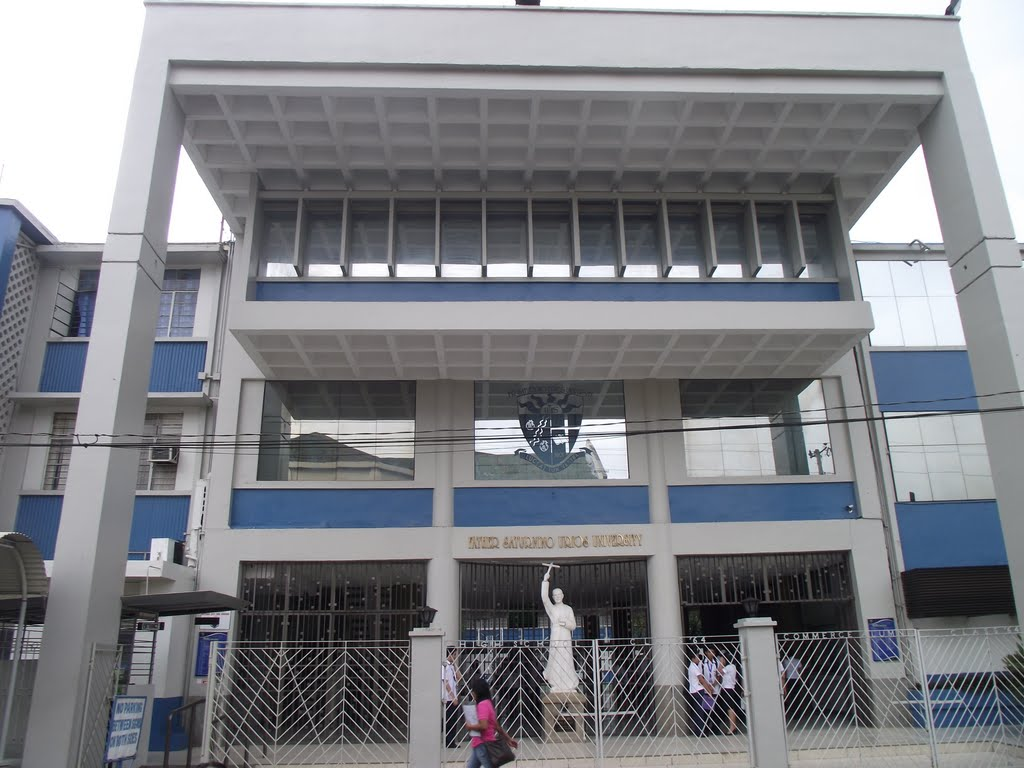
Main campus

Following the enactment of Article XV, Section 7 of the 1973 Philippine Constitution, which mandated the administration of educational institutions by Filipino citizens, the Dutch MSC priests relinquished control of Urios College. On September 24, 1976, the Board of Trustees, chaired by Bishop Morelos, appointed Dr. Juanito A. Lao as the first Filipino lay president of the institution. Lao's administration emphasized high academic standards, modern facilities, and strengthened Catholic identity through community engagement programs. The school's slogan at the time was: For your children’s Christian formation and quality education, enroll them at Urios College.

During the 1980s, Urios College received accreditation from the Philippine Accrediting Association of Schools, Colleges, and Universities (PAASCU) and introduced new academic programs, including master's degrees in educational management and business administration, as well as engineering and technical courses. By the 1990s, infrastructure development accelerated with the construction of new buildings, including a gymnasium, high school complex, and skywalk. The college also introduced additional degree programs, including nursing, accountancy, law, and doctoral programs.

In 1998, Dr. Lao retired after 22 years of leadership. The Board of Trustees appointed Dr. Wilma B. Balmocena as interim president, during which time she oversaw accreditation renewals and preparations for the school's centennial celebration. On May 26, 2001, Bishop Juan de Dios M. Pueblos was appointed as the ninth president, initiating a five-year development plan to guide the institution into the 21st century.

=== Attainment of university status ===
On March 5, 2004, Rev. Fr. John Christian U. Young was elected as the tenth president of Urios College. His leadership focused on structural reorganization and the goal of elevating the institution to university status. In February and July 2006, the Commission on Higher Education (CHED) conducted evaluations of the school's facilities, faculty, and academic programs. On July 10, 2006, CHED granted Urios College university status, officially renaming it Father Saturnino Urios University (FSUU).

== Administration and organization ==
FSUU has a board of trustees, which elects the president and two vice presidents (academics and research & administrative and student affairs).

=== Colleges ===
College	Year founded
Arts and Sciences	1955
Operations, Resources, and Entrepreneurship	1955
Teacher Education	1955
Engineering and Technology	1980
Graduate Studies	1985
Accountancy	1990
Nursing	1991
Information, Technology, Entertainment, and Computing	1994
Law	1997
Criminal Justice Education	2010
Innovative Hospitality and Tourism	2025

FSUU has 9 undergraduate colleges, and two postgraduate colleges (the College of Law, and Graduate Studies), based in the main campus. It also has a basic education unit at the Abp. Morelos Campus, offering K-12 education.

=== Presidents ===
Name	Term	Notes
Fr. Saturnino Urios, SJ	1901–1914	Founder of Butuan Parochial School for Boys.
Fr. Jose Buxo, SJ	1914–1939	
Antonius Jansen	1939–1947	
Gerald Tangelder	1947–1954	
Venancio Portillo	1954–1955	
Francisco van Dijk	1955–1959	
Henry van Engelen	1959–1963	
George Haggenburg	1960–1971	
Juanito A. Lao	1976–1998	Longest-serving president of the university
Wilma B. Balmocena	1998–2001	
Juan de Dios M. Pueblos	2001–2004	second Bishop of Butuan
Rev. Fr. John Christian U. Young	2004–2024	First president after gaining university status
Rev. Fr. Randy Jasper C. Odchigue	2024-present	

== Campuses ==
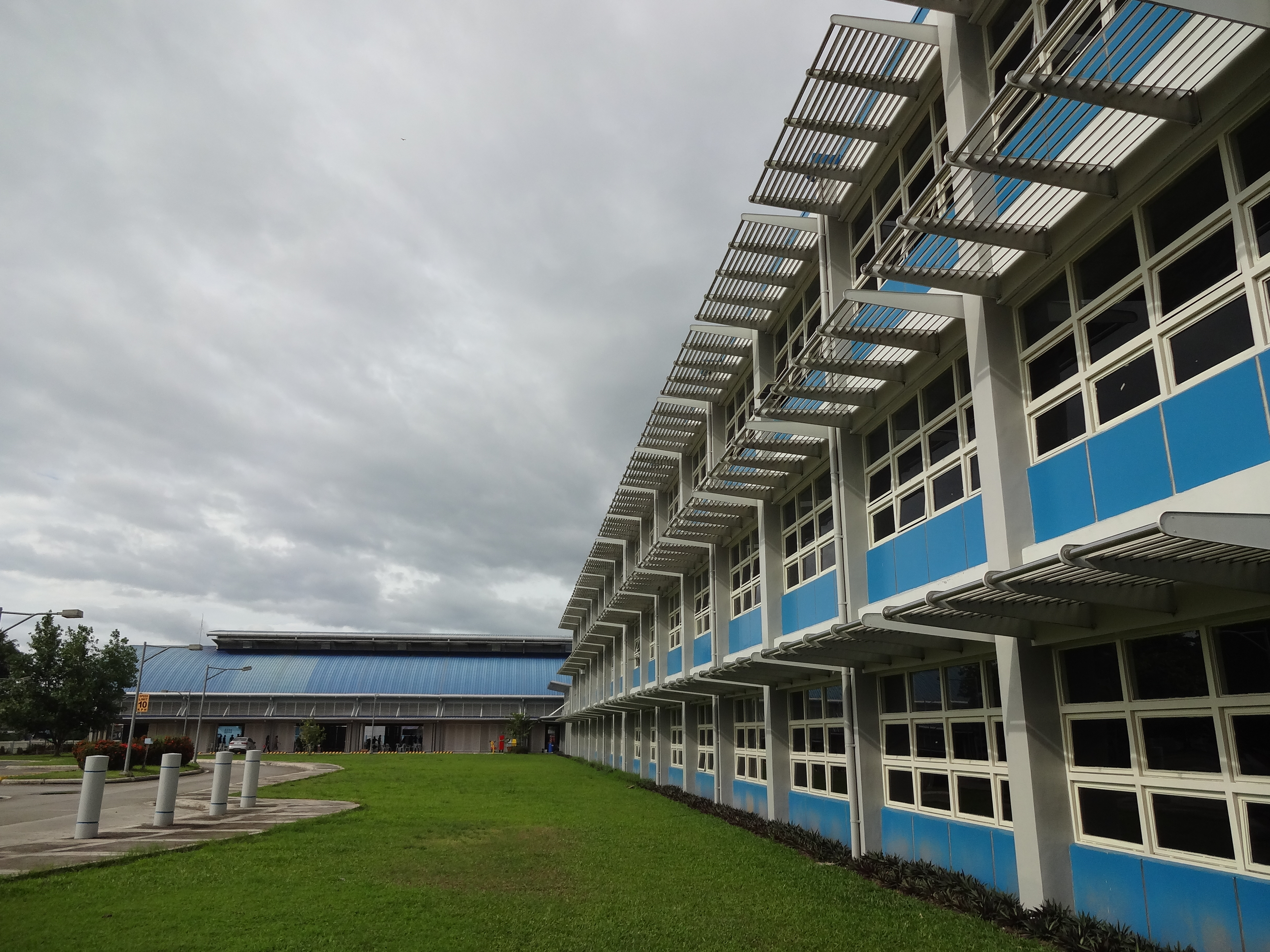
Morelos Campus

Campus	Building	Tenants	Notes
Main Campus	College Building Main (CB)	College Students; Vice-president Offices (Academic, and Administrative and Student Affairs); Employees Offices; Property Management Office; School Clinic; Libraries; Computer Laboratories; Biology, and Chemistry Laboratories	
Main Campus	College Building South (CBS)	Arts and Science Office (Natural Sciences & Mathematics, Social Sciences Divisions); Criminology Office; Scholarship Office; Physics Laboratory; Haggenburg Hall; Student and Alumni Affairs; University Gym	Formerly the high school building until May 31, 2008, and Bishop Pueblos Senior High School until June 15, 2024
Main Campus	College Building East (CBE)	College Students; Office of the University President	Formerly the elementary building until May 31, 2008. Re-opened on October 7, 2015.
Abp. Morelos Campus		Basic Education Students including Senior High School; Swimming Pool	Opened in 2008. The open field is fitted with Flag football and Ultimate frisbee

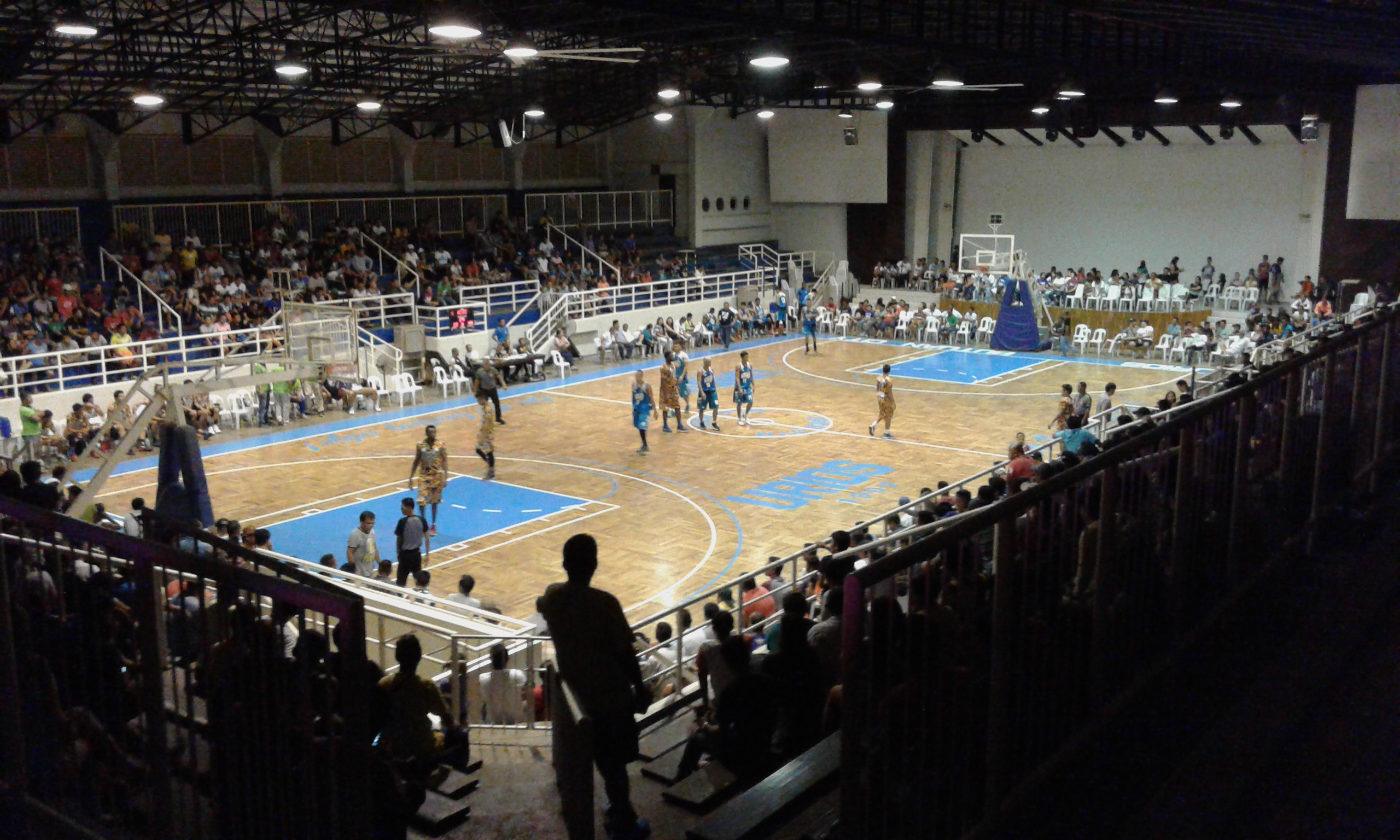
University Gym

== Notable people ==
- Gen. Hernando DCA Iriberri – the 46th Chief of Staff of the AFP
- Jason James Dy – the grand champion of ABS-CBN's The Voice of the Philippines Season 2
- Rep. Ma. Angelica Rosedell Amante-Matba - Agusan del Norte Representative from second District and Governor of Agusan del Norte (1995-2004, 2013-2019, 2022-present)
- Atty. Archie Francisco F. Gamboa - the 21st Chief of the Philippine National Police, lawyer
- Engr. Ronnievic Lagnada – Civil Engineer; 14th Mayor of Butuan (2016–2025)
- Santiago Cane Jr. - Governor of Agusan del Sur (2019-present)
- Atty. Law Fortun - Lawyer; 15th Mayor of Butuan (2025-present), Agusan del Norte 1st district representative (2013-2022) and Vice-Mayor of Butuan (2010-2013, 2022-2025)

== Sister schools ==
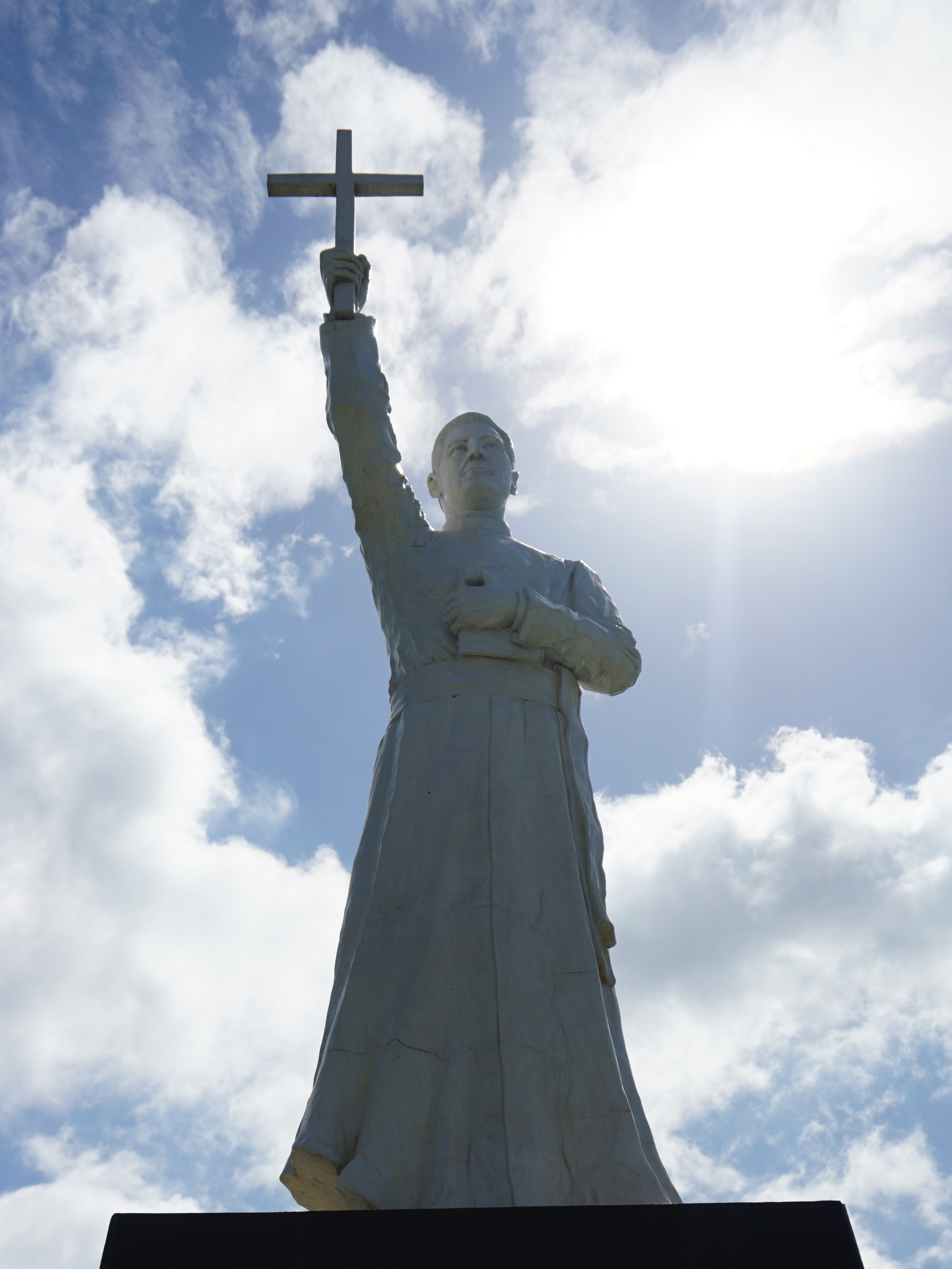
Statue of Fr. Saturnino Urios, S.J.

- Father Urios Institute of Technology of Ampayon, Inc. (Ampayon, Butuan)
- Father Saturnino Urios College of Bayugan, Inc. (Bayugan)
- Father Saturnino Urios College of Sibagat, Inc. (Sibagat)
- Father Saturnino Urios College of Trento, Inc. (Trento, Agusan del Sur)
- Father Urios Academy of Magallanes, Inc. (Magallanes, Agusan del Norte)
- Father Urios Academy of Hinatuan, Inc. (Hinatuan, Surigao del Sur)
- Father Urios High School - Prosperidad (Prosperidad)
- Mt. Carmel College of San Francisco, Inc. (San Francisco, Agusan del Sur)
- Mt. Carmel High School of Rosario, Inc. (Rosario, Agusan del Sur)
- Our Lady of Carmen Academy of Caraga, Inc. (Carmen, Agusan del Norte)
- Candelaria Institute of Technology of Cabadbaran, Inc. (Cabadbaran)
- Immaculate Heart of Mary Academy - Kitcharao, Inc. (Kitcharao)
- Saint Michael College of Caraga, Inc. (Nasipit)
- Saint James High School of Buenavista, Inc. (Buenavista, Agusan del Norte)
