= Tabuk, Kalinga =

Capital city of Kalinga, Philippines

Tabuk
- Component city
- City of Tabuk
- Manuel S. Agyao Boulevard

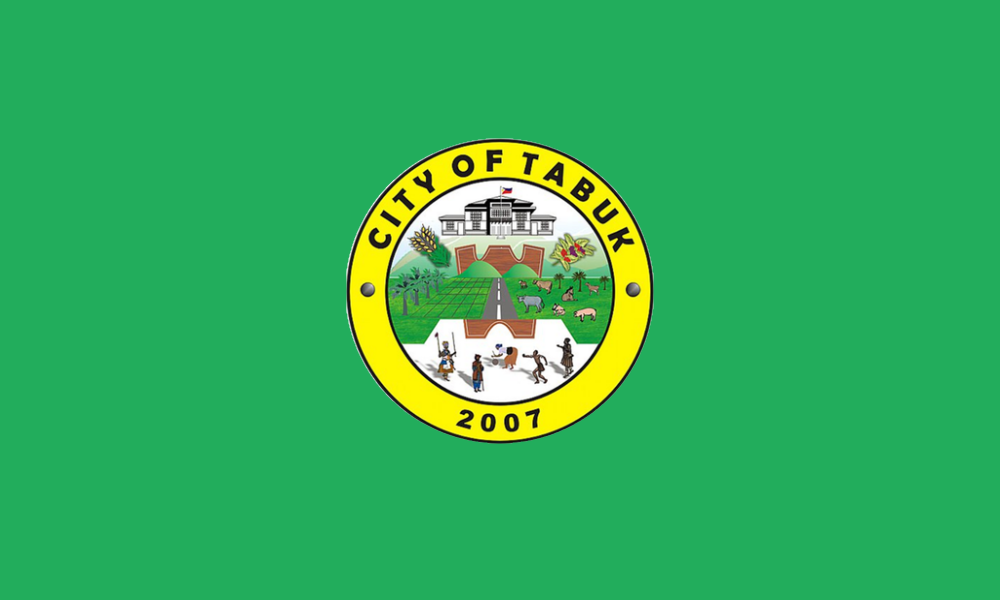
- Flag Seal

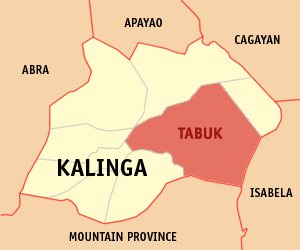
- Map of Kalinga with Tabuk highlighted
- Interactive map of Tabuk
- Location within the Philippines
- Coordinates: 17°24′25″N 121°26′33″E
- Country: Philippines
- Region: Cordillera Administrative Region
- Province: Kalinga
- District: Lone district
- Founded: June 16, 1950
- Cityhood: June 23, 2007 (Lost cityhood in 2008 and 2010)
- Affirmed Cityhood: February 15, 2011
- Barangays: 43 (see Barangays)

Government
  - Type: Sangguniang Panlungsod
  - Mayor: Darwin C. Estrañero
  - Vice Mayor: Dick G. Bal-o
  - Representative: Caroline B. Agyao
  - City Council: Members: Errol B. Comafay Jr.; Lucretina S. Sarol; Marc Rainier B. Duguiang; Ivan Yannick S. Bagayao; Zorayda Mia M. Wacnang; Juan Thomas T. Duyan; Eduardo A. Sacayle; Samuel B. Suma-al; Abraham P. Licaycay; Jayferson G. Bon-as
  - Electorate: 74,572 voters (2025)

Area
  - Total: 700.25 km^{2} (270.37 sq mi)
- Elevation: 293 m (961 ft)
- Highest elevation: 1,338 m (4,390 ft)
- Lowest elevation: 44 m (144 ft)

Population (2024 census)
  - Total: 122,771
  - Density: 175.32/km^{2} (454.09/sq mi)
  - Households: 25,731

Economy
  - Income class: 1st city income class
  - Poverty incidence: 3.87% (2023)
  - Revenue: ₱ 1,618 million (2024)
  - Assets: ₱ 4,898 million (2024)
  - Expenditure: ₱ 1,562 million (2024)
  - Liabilities: ₱ 1,700 million (2024)

Service provider
  - Electricity: Kalinga - Apayao Electric Cooperative (KAELCO)
- Time zone: UTC+8 (PST)
- ZIP code: 3800
- PSGC: 143213000
- IDD : area code: +63 (0)74
- Native languages: Kalinga; Ga'dang; Ilocano; Tagalog
- Website: tabukcity.gov.ph

Tabuk, officially the City of Tabuk (Ilocano: Siudad ti Tabuk; Filipino: Lungsod ng Tabuk), is a component city and capital of the province of Kalinga, Philippines. According to the 2024 census, it has a population of 122,771 people, making it the most populous in the province and third in the region after La Trinidad and Baguio. It was the largest city in Luzon by land area before it was overtaken by Ilagan after its cityhood in 2012.

== Etymology ==
The term Tabuk comes from the word Tobog which refers to a living stream that flows from Sitio Paligatto in Barangay Balawag to the Chico River. The lands passed by this watercourse were also known as Tobog. Tabuk arose from misunderstanding letter G for C (Tobog to Toboc) and letter A for letter O, resulting in Taboc. Finally, in later years, they preferred to spell the letters oc as uk, resulting in the current Tabuk.

== History ==
=== Early history ===
Tabuk was previously known as the "Valley of Gamonangs" after the Kalinga tribe that ruled Northern Kalinga centuries ago, according to one of the early Spanish missionaries. They lived in the huge valleys and densely forested plains between the Chico and Cagayan River, and their epic military exploits are recounted in the Kalinga Ullalim. According to historical records, they repelled every attempt by the Spaniards to lodge their claims in the valley.

Repopulation started just before World War I. The American government dispatched six volunteer pioneers from Sitio Tobog and Lubuagan to repopulate the area. The Lubuagan locals died from malaria, leaving only Tobog newcomers to cultivate the soil in Laya. They were then joined by their cousins from Tobog. Between 1922 and 1923, the second wave of settlers arrived from Bontoc. They then set up a colony at Bantay. Another group from Bontoc and Cervantes, Ilocos Sur, was taken to Tuga and given the required farm implements, such as mosquito nets and kitchen utensils. They were later joined by migrants from La Union.

==== Establishment ====
The Bureau of Land Survey Party arrived in the early 1930s, ushering in a new era for the community. Tabuk was ruled by four groups of municipal executives before becoming a legal municipality on June 16, 1950, under Republic Act No. 533.

=== Cityhood ===
Tabuk became the Cordillera's second city after Baguio on June 23, 2007, when 17,060 voters ratified Republic Act No. 9404. On November 18, 2008, the Supreme Court voted 6–5 to revert Tabuk, among other 15 cities', status back to municipalities. However, on December 21, 2009, the court reversed its first decision, returning Tabuk and the 15 other municipalities back to cities again. It contended that these cities were not covered by Republic Act 9009 – the law enacted in June 2001 that increased the income requirement for cities from P20 million to P100 million – as proven by transcripts of Senate debates while crafting RA 9009.

But on August 24, 2010, the court made a reversal again, reinstating its November 2008 decision, making Tabuk and the other 15 cities regular municipalities again. It concluded that the Local Government Code as amended by RA 9009 should be followed, without exception.

Finally, on February 15, 2011, Tabuk and the 15 municipalities became cities again after the court made a third reversal. This time the court acknowledged, among others, that the 16 cityhood laws amended RA 9009, effectively amending the Local Government Code itself.

After six years of legal battles, in its board resolution, the League of Cities of the Philippines acknowledged and recognized the cityhood of Tabuk and 15 other cities.

== Geography ==
The City of Tabuk is bordered by Pinukpuk in the north, Rizal in the east, Quezon in Isabela in the southeast, Paracelis in Mountain Province, and Tanudan in the south, and Lubuagan and Pasil in the west.

Since 2007, Tabuk is the only city in Kalinga, located in the eastern part of the Cordillera Mountain Range. It is widely regarded as the Cordillera's rice granary due to its extensive agricultural area, which produces enormous quantities of rice that is distributed to other areas. For the past two decades, it has produced exceptional farmers on a national scale.

Tabuk is situated 465.73 kilometers (289.39 mi) from the country's capital city of Manila.

=== Barangays ===
The City of Tabuk is politically subdivided into 43 barangays. These barangays are headed by elected officials: Barangay Captain, Barangay Council, whose members are called Barangay Councilors. All officials are elected every three years.

- Agbannawag
- Amlao
- Appas
- Bado Dangwa
- Bagumbayan
- Balawag
- Balong
- Bantay
- Bulanao Centro
- Bulanao Norte
- Bulo
- Cabaritan
- Cabaruan
- Calaccad
- Calanan
- Casigayan
- Cudal
- Dagupan Centro (Poblacion)
- Dagupan West
- Dilag
- Dupag
- Gobgob
- Guilayon
- Ipil
- Lacnog
- Lacnog West
- Lanna
- Laya East
- Laya West
- Lucog
- Magnao
- Magsaysay
- Malalao
- Malin-awa
- Masablang
- Nambaran
- Nambucayan
- Naneng
- New Tanglag
- San Juan
- San Julian
- Suyang
- Tuga

=== Climate ===
Climate data for Tabuk
Month	Jan	Feb	Mar	Apr	May	Jun	Jul	Aug	Sep	Oct	Nov	Dec	Year
Mean daily maximum °C (°F)	25 (77)	27 (81)	29 (84)	32 (90)	31 (88)	31 (88)	30 (86)	30 (86)	30 (86)	29 (84)	27 (81)	26 (79)	29 (84)
Mean daily minimum °C (°F)	20 (68)	20 (68)	21 (70)	23 (73)	24 (75)	24 (75)	24 (75)	24 (75)	24 (75)	23 (73)	23 (73)	21 (70)	23 (73)
Average precipitation mm (inches)	78 (3.1)	60 (2.4)	49 (1.9)	51 (2.0)	194 (7.6)	197 (7.8)	209 (8.2)	226 (8.9)	185 (7.3)	180 (7.1)	143 (5.6)	183 (7.2)	1,755 (69.1)
Average rainy days	15.6	12.5	11.8	12.5	21.0	23.3	25.2	26.1	22.6	17.1	16.7	19.6	224
Source: Meteoblue

== Demographics ==
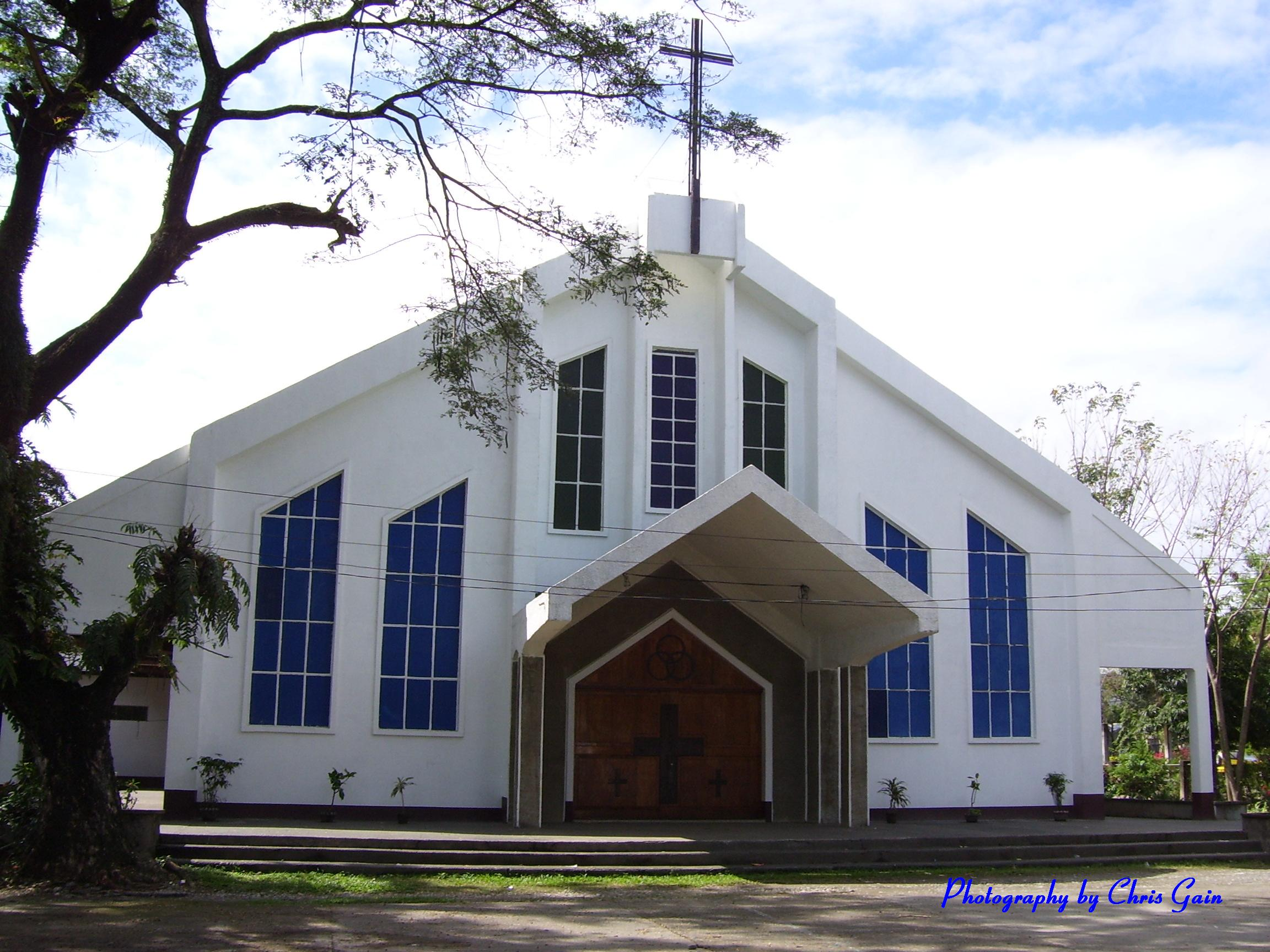
Cathedral of the Episcopal Church in the Philippines

Population census of Tabuk
Year	Pop.	±% p.a.
1918	4,079	—
1939	3,343	−0.94%
1948	7,376	+9.19%
1960	21,261	+9.22%
1970	28,016	+2.79%
1975	33,918	+3.91%
1980	42,768	+4.74%
1990	57,200	+2.95%
1995	63,507	+1.98%
2000	78,633	+4.69%
2007	87,912	+1.55%
2010	103,912	+6.27%
2015	110,642	+1.20%
2020	121,033	+1.91%
2024	122,771	+0.34%
Source: Philippine Statistics Authority

In the 2024 census, the population of Tabuk was 122,771 people, with a density of 180/km^{2} or 470/sq mi.

=== Language ===
Kalinga is the main language of Tabuk. Ilocano is used as a lingua franca in the city.

== Economy ==
Poverty incidence of Tabuk (%)

Source: Philippine Statistics Authority

Tabuk City Public Market

The road networks connecting Tabuk to the Cagayan Valley and Baguio via Bontoc attracted additional residents and investments, accelerating the economic development of the city. The economy is entirely agro-based, and the Chico River Irrigation System's completion accelerated its growth even more. The city is also suggested as the location of the Cordillera's Regional Agro-Industrial Center. This is projected to help Tabuk become the region's leading agri-industrial metropolis.

== Government ==
Tabuk City Hall

=== Local government ===
Tabuk, belonging to the lone congressional district of the province of Kalinga, is governed by a mayor designated as its local chief executive and by a city council as its legislative body in accordance with the Local Government Code. The mayor, vice mayor, and the councilors are elected directly by the people through elections which are held every three years.

=== Elected officials ===
Members of the Tabuk City Council (2025–2028)
Position	Name
District Representative (Lone District of the Province of Kalinga)	Caroline B. Agyao
Chief Executive of the City of Tabuk	Mayor Darwin C. Estrañero
Presiding Officer of the City Council of Tabuk	Vice Mayor Dick G. Bal-o
Councilors of the City of Tabuk	Errol B. Comafay Jr.
Councilors of the City of Tabuk	Lucretina S. Sarol
Councilors of the City of Tabuk	Marc Rainier B. Duguiang
Councilors of the City of Tabuk	Ivan Yannick S. Bagayao
Councilors of the City of Tabuk	Zorayda Mia M. Wacnang
Councilors of the City of Tabuk	Juan Thomas T. Duyan
Councilors of the City of Tabuk	Eduardo A. Sacayle
Councilors of the City of Tabuk	Samuel B. Suma-al
Councilors of the City of Tabuk	Abraham P. Licaycay
Councilors of the City of Tabuk	Jayferson G. Bon-as

== Education ==
The Tabuk City Schools Division Office governs all educational institutions within the city. It oversees the management and operations of all private and public, from primary to secondary schools.

=== Primary and elementary schools ===
- Addang Primary School
- Agbannawag Elementary School
- Amlao Elementary School
- Appas Elementary School
- Bado Dangwa Elementary School
- Balatoc Primary School
- Balawag Elementary School
- Balong Elementary School
- Banagan Primary School
- Bantay Elementary School
- Banneng Elementary School
- Basao Isla Elementary School
- Bayabat Elementary School
- Binongsay Elementary School
- Bulanao Central School
- Bulanao East Elementary School
- Bulanao East Annex - Greenhills Primary School
- Bulanao West Elementary School
- Bullaguian Elementary School
- Bulo East Elementary School
- Bulo West Elementary School
- Burayukan Elementary School
- Burubor Elementary School
- Cabaritan Elementary School
- Cabaruan Elementary School
- Calaccad Elementary School
- Calanan Elementary School
- Callagan Elementary School
- Callagdao Elementary School
- Camp Conrado M. Balweg Elementary School
- Casigayan Elementary School
- Cataw Primary School
- Cudal Elementary School
- Dalnacan Elementary School
- Dananao Primary School
- Dupag Elementary School
- Gaogao Elementary School
- Gawidan Elementary School
- Gobgob Elementary School
- Gradual Discovery Elementary School
- Guilayon Elementary School
- Hilltop Elementary School
- Ipil Elementary School
- Jesus Cares Learning Center of Tabuk
- Kalinga Special Education Center
- Lacnog Elementary School
- Lanna Elementary School
- Laya Elementary School
- Laya West Elementary School
- Lucog Elementary School
- Mabato Elementary School
- Madapdappig Elementary School
- Madopdop Elementary School
- Magabbangon Elementary School
- Magnao Elementary School
- Magsaysay Elementary School
- Malalao Elementary School
- Maledda Elementary School
- Malin-awa Elementary School
- Mallong Elementary School
- Map-Hod Montessori Learning Center
- Masablang Elementary School
- Mansanita Elementary School
- Matucnang Elementary School
- Nambaran Elementary School
- Nambucayan Elementary School
- Namnama Elementary School
- Naneng Elementary School
- New Age Montessori School
- New Balbalan ES
- New Bangad ES
- New Tanglag Elementary School
- Pa-o Elementary School
- Pantar Elementary School
- Paligatto Elementary School
- Pinagan ES
- San Pablo Primary School
- San Juan Elementary School
- San Julian Elementary School
- Sotto Elementary School
- Southern Tabuk CS
- Spring Academy Tabuk City
- St. Theresita's School of Tabuk
- St. William's Academy
- St. William's Academy Bulanao
- Suyang Elementary School
- Tabuk Baptist Christian Academy
- Tabuk City Central School
- Tabuk Seventh-day Adventist School
- Tangbay Elementary School
- Tannubong Elementary School
- Toppan Elementary School
- Tuliao Elementary School
- UCCP Capitol Early Childhood School
- UCCP Early Childhood Learning Center
- Western Tabuk Central School

=== Secondary schools ===
- Agbannawag National High School
- Bado Dangwa National High School
- Balawag National High School
- Balong National High School
- Bulo National High School
- Calaccad National High School
- Cudal National High School
- Dilag Integrated School
- Eastern Kalinga National High School
- Kalinga National High School
- International School of Asia and the Pacific-Kalinga Campus
- Lacnog Integrated School
- Maledda Integrated School
- Nambaran Agro-Industrial National High School
- Nambucayan National High School
- Naneng National High School
- Naneng NHS - Mosimos Extension
- New Tanglag National High School
- Tabuk City National High School
- Toppan Integrated School
- Tuga National High School

=== Higher educational institutions ===
- Cordillera A+ Computer Technology College
- Kalinga Colleges of Science and Technology
- Kalinga State University
- Saint Tonis College
- St. Louis College of Bulanao
- Tabuk Institute
