= List of Agusan Catholic Education Association Schools =

The Agusan Catholic Education Association (ACEA) is an association of Catholic schools and colleges under or may be run by the Roman Catholic Diocese of Butuan.

The current Diocesan School Board is the bishop of the Diocese of Butuan, Msgr. Juan de Dios M. Pueblos, DD and the Director of ACEA is Msgr. Bienvenido A. Betaizar, PC.

== List of ACEA institutions ==
=== Agusan del Norte ===
- Father Saturnino Urios University
- Father Urios Institute of Technology - Ampayon, Butuan
- Sacred Heart School of Butuan - Butuan
- Sto. Niño Kindergarten - Libertad, Butuan
- Carmen Academy - Carmen, Agusan del Norte
- Saint Michael College of Caraga - Nasipit, Agusan del Norte
- Saint James High School - Buenavista, Agusan del Norte
- San Isidro Learning Center - Remedios T. Romualdez, Agusan del Norte
- Candelaria Institute - Cabadbaran
- Father Urios Academy of Magallanes, Inc. - Magallanes, Agusan del Norte
- Immaculate Heart of Mary Academy - Kitcharao, Agusan del Norte

=== Agusan del Sur ===
- Father Saturnino Urios College of Sibagat - Sibagat, Agusan del Sur
- Father Saturnino Urios College of Bayugan - Bayugan
- Father Urios High School - Properidad, Agusan del Sur
- Mt. Carmel College of San Francisco - San Francisco, Agusan del Sur
- Mt. Carmel High School - Rosario, Agusan del Sur
- Urios College of Trento - Trento, Agusan del Sur
