= League of Cities of the Philippines v. COMELEC =

Landmark decision

- Court: Supreme Court of the Philippines
- Full case name: League of Cities of the Philippines v. Commission on Elections
- Decided: April 12, 2011 (final case)
- Citations: 663 Phil. 496 (G.R. Nos. 176951, 177499, and 178056)

Court membership
- Judges sitting: Renato Corona (Chief Justice), Antonio Carpio (dissenting), Conchita Carpio-Morales (dissenting), Presbitero Velasco, Antonio Eduardo Nachura (took no part), Teresita de Castro, Arturo Brion (dissenting), Diosdado Peralta (dissenting), Lucas Bersamin, Mariano del Castillo (took no part), Roberto A. Abad, Martin Villarama Jr. (dissenting), Jose Perez, Jose C. Mendoza, Maria Lourdes Sereno (dissenting)

Case opinions
- April 12, 2011, case Concurring Opinion: Roberto A. Abad; Dissenting Opinion: Antonio Carpio; Dissenting Opinion: Maria Lourdes Sereno
- Decision by: Lucas Bersamin (April 12, 2011, case)

League of Cities of the Philippines v. COMELEC is a landmark decision of the Supreme Court of the Philippines about the validity of the cityhood laws of 16 municipalities in the Philippines. The case clarifies the requirements for the conversion of a municipality into a component city. The court in its final decision ruled that the cityhood laws of the 16 municipalities in the Philippines are constitutional.

== Background and history ==
In the 11th Congress, 57 bills seeking the conversion of municipalities into component cities were filed before the House of Representatives. However, Congress did not act on the 24 out of the 57 municipalities. In the 12th Congress, Republic Act No. 9009 was enacted revising the Local Government Code (LGC) by increasing the income requirement to qualify for conversion into a city from ₱20 million annual income to ₱100 million locally generated income. In the thirteenth Congress, 16 of the 24 municipalities filed their cityhood bills. Each of the cityhood bills contained a common provision exempting the particular municipality from the ₱100 million income requirement imposed by RA No. 9009. These cityhood bills lapsed into law on various dates after President Gloria Macapagal Arroyo did not sign them.

Petitioners filed to declare the Cityhood Laws unconstitutional for violation of Section 10, Article X of the 1987 Constitution, as well as for violation of the equal protection clause. Petitioners also pointed out that the wholesale conversion of municipalities into cities will reduce the share of existing cities in the Internal Revenue Allotment (IRA) because more cities will share the same amount of internal revenue set aside for all cities under Section 285 of the Local Government Code.

The municipalities involved were called as "League of 16". They were:

- RA # 9389 (Baybay in Leyte)
- RA # 9390 (Bogo in Cebu)
- RA # 9391 (Catbalogan in Samar)
- RA # 9392 (Tandag in Surigao del Sur)
- RA # 9393 (Lamitan in Basilan)
- RA # 9394 (Borongan in Eastern Samar)
- RA # 9398 (Tayabas in Quezon)
- RA # 9404 (Tabuk in Kalinga)
- RA # 9405 (Bayugan in Agusan del Sur)
- RA # 9407 (Batac in Ilocos Norte)
- RA # 9408 (Mati in Davao Oriental)
- RA # 9409 (Guihulngan in Negros Oriental)
- RA # 9434 (Cabadbaran in Agusan del Norte)
- RA # 9435 (El Salvador in Misamis Oriental)
- RA # 9436 (Carcar in Cebu)
- RA # 9491 (Naga in Cebu)

== Decision ==
On November 8, 2008, the Court, by a vote of 6–5, held that the exemptions in the Cityhood Laws were unconstitutional because Sec. 10, Art. X of the Constitution requires that such exemption must be written into the LGC and not into any other laws. The Court stated that the Cityhood Laws violate sec. 6, Art. X of the Constitution for they prevent a fair and just distribution of the national taxes to local government units. It further held that the criteria, as prescribed in the LGC, must be strictly followed because such criteria are material in determining the “just share” of local government units (LGUs) in national taxes.

On March 31, 2009, the Court, by a vote of 7–5, denied the first motion for reconsideration. The second motion for reconsideration was denied on April 28, 2009.

On December 21, 2009, the Court, by a vote of 6-4 reversed its November 18, 2008, decision and declared the Cityhood Laws as constitutional. It ruled that based on the deliberations of the Congress and the intent of the same the then pending cityhood bills would be outside the pale of the minimum income requirement of ₱100 million that Senate Bill No. 2159 proposes; and that RA 9009 would not have any retroactive effect insofar as the cityhood bills are concerned. It also held that the conversion of a municipality into a city would only affect its status as a political unit, but not its property as such, it added. Furthermore, it stressed that respondent LGUs were qualified cityhood applicants before the enactment of RA 9009 for to impose on them the much higher income requirement after what they have gone through would appear to be indeed unfair. Thus, the imperatives of fairness dictate that they should be given a legal remedy by which they should be allowed to prove that they have all the necessary qualifications for city status using the criteria set forth under the LGC of 1991 and its amendment by RA 9009.

On August 24, 2010, the Court, with a vote of 7-6 granted the motions for reconsideration of the petitioners and reinstated its November 18, 2008, decision. It Court reiterated its November 18, 2008, ruling that the Cityhood Laws violate sec. 10, Art. X of the Constitution which expressly provides that:

“no city…shall be created…except by the criteria established in the local government code.”

It stressed that while all the criteria for the creation of cities must be embodied exclusively in the Local Government Code, the assailed Cityhood Laws provided an exemption from the increased income requirement for the creation of cities under sec. 450 of the LGC. It further held that:

“The unconstitutionality of the Cityhood Laws lies in the fact that Congress provided an exemption contrary to the express language of the Constitution….
...Congress exceeded and abused its law-making power, rendering the challenged Cityhood Laws void for being violative of the Constitution.”

Finally, it ruled that limiting the exemption only to the 16 municipalities violates the requirement that the classification must apply to all similarly situated.

On February 15, 2011, the Court reversed its own decision for the fourth time, declaring the Cityhood Laws as constitutional.

On April 12, 2011, the Court upheld its ruling with finality that the Cityhood Laws are constitutional. The Court ratiocinated that:

“We should not ever lose sight of the fact that the 16 cities covered by the Cityhood Laws not only had conversion bills pending during the 11th Congress, but have also complied with the requirements of the LGC prescribed before its amendment by RA No. 9009. Congress undeniably gave these cities all the considerations that justice and fair play demanded. Hence, this Court should do no less by stamping its imprimatur to the clear and unmistakable legislative intent and by duly recognizing the certain collective wisdom of Congress.”

Hence, the 16 municipalities were finally converted into component cities.

== Aftermath ==
The League of Cities of the Philippines finally recognized the sixteen newly converted cities in the country, called the “League of 16,” as its official members on July 19, 2013.

== See also ==
- League of Cities of the Philippines
