= Caraga State University =

Public university in Agusan del Norte, Philippines

- Pamantasang Pampamahalaan ng Karaga (Filipino)
- Former names: Agusan Agriculture High School (1918–1963); Northern Mindanao National Agricultural College (1963–1982); Northern Mindanao State Institute of Science and Technology (1983–2010)
- Type: State Coeducational higher education institution
- Established: 1946; 80 years ago
- Academic affiliations: Philippine Association of State Universities and Colleges (PASUC); Mindanao Association of State Colleges and Universities Foundation (MASCUF)
- Chairman: Shirley C. Agrupis
- President: Rolyn C. Daguil
- Vice-president: List: Luisito I. Tabada (VP for Academic Affairs); Alexander T. Demetillo (VP for Administration & Finance); Rissa L. Mercado, PhD (VP for Student Affairs and Auxiliary Services); Jeffrey T. Dellosa (VP for Research, Innovation & Extension)
- Location: Ampayon, Butuan, Agusan del Norte, Philippines; 8°57′23″N 125°35′47″E
- Campus: Main Campus Ampayon, Butuan; Cabadbaran City Campus
- Newspaper: The Gold Panicles
- Colors: Green and Gold
- Website: www.carsu.edu.ph
- Location in Mindanao Location in the Philippines

Caraga State University (formerly Northern Mindanao State Institute of Science and Technology, abbreviated NORMISIST) is a state-owned university in Agusan del Norte, Philippines. Its main campus is in Ampayon, Butuan, with an auxiliary campus in Cabadbaran.

On July 27, 2009, the Congress of the Philippines passed into law Republic Act No. 9854 which was signed by President Gloria Macapagal Arroyo on December 16, 2009, fusing together Northern Mindanao State Institute of Science and Technology in Butuan and Northern Mindanao College of Arts, Science and Technology in Cabadbaran into Caraga State University retaining the Butuan branch as its main campus.

== History ==
On February 14, 1920, Proclamation Number 4 was passed by the American governor to the Philippines Francis Burton Harrison, declaring the reservation of a 232-hectare virgin forest land in Barrio Ampayon, in the Municipality of Butuan, province of Agusan as the grounds of the young school.

The first framework of the school building was laid down in 1937; the development of the school was deferred as the government deviated to giving priority to serve the Manobo cultural minority through the creation of the Bunawan Agricultural High School in Agusan del Sur. At the close of World War II in 1946, the Agusan Agricultural High School was established in the reserved area.

On June 22, 1963, Republic Act 3604 was passed, converting the school into the Northern Mindanao National Agricultural College (NORMINAC). House Bill No. 25 was passed, converting NORMINAC to the Northern Mindanao State Institute of Science and Technology (NORMISIST). The House Bill became Batas Pambansa Blg. 241 when President Ferdinand Marcos signed it into law on November 11, 1982.

RA9854, signed on December 16, 2009, by President Gloria Macapagal Arroyo, established the Caraga State University in the region by integrating the Northern Mindanao State Institute of Science and Technology (NORMISIST) of this city and the Northern Mindanao College of Science and Technology (NMCAST) in Cabadbaran, Agusan del Norte with its main campus in Butuan.

== Academics ==
Caraga State University serves the Caraga Region through the delivery of accredited programs and diploma, associate, undergraduate and graduate courses. The university offers undergraduate and graduate degree programs in addition to some technical and vocational courses.

Caraga State University in Butuan City officially opened its School of Medicine and launched its Doctor of Medicine program for the academic year 2026-2027. The new medical school aims to address limited access to quality medical education and the shortage of healthcare professionals in the region. The program received approval from the Commission on Higher Education (CHED) to provide rigorous academic instruction and practical clinical training.

== Campuses ==
The Caraga State University is located along the Phil-Japan Friendship Highway which traverses Butuan, Surigao City, Bayugan, Cabadbaran and the provinces of Agusan del Norte, Agusan del Sur, Surigao del Norte and Surigao del Sur, northeast of Mindanao, south of the Philippines.

The Butuan Campus has an area of 232 hectares, 32 hectares of which is allocated for academic buildings and support facilities, including a gymnasium, while the remaining 200 hectares of land is for production, research, and extension projects of the university.

The Cabadbaran Campus is in Cabadbaran of Agusan del Norte, north of Butuan. The Caraga State University - Cabadbaran Campus is in an eight-hectare campus at T. Curato Street. The campus specializes in developing individuals in the fields of Electrical Engineering, Industrial Technology and Education, Information Technology, Hotel and Restaurant Management, and Teacher Education.

== Gallery ==
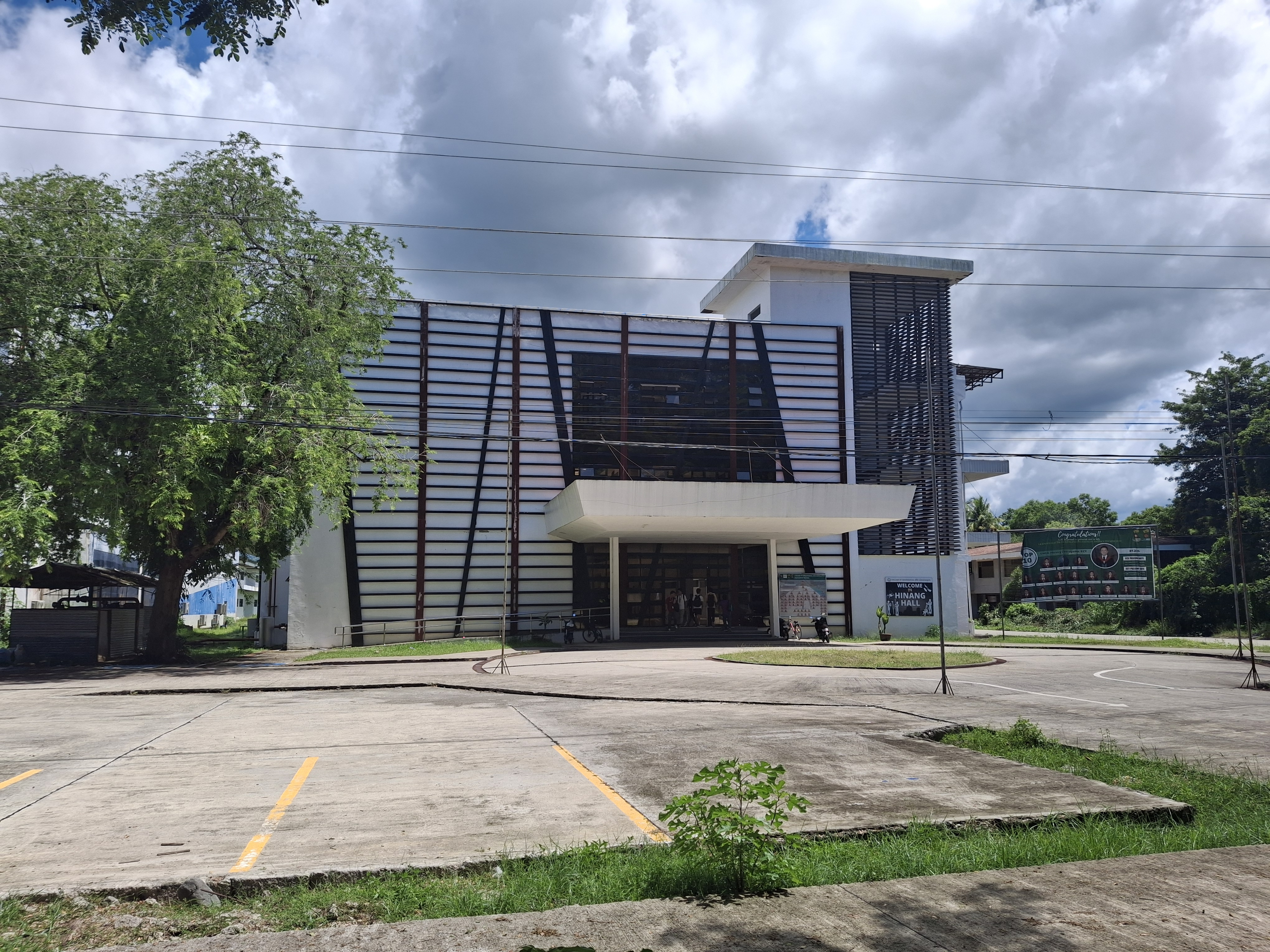
Hinang Hall houses the College of Engineering and Geo Sciences (CEGS).

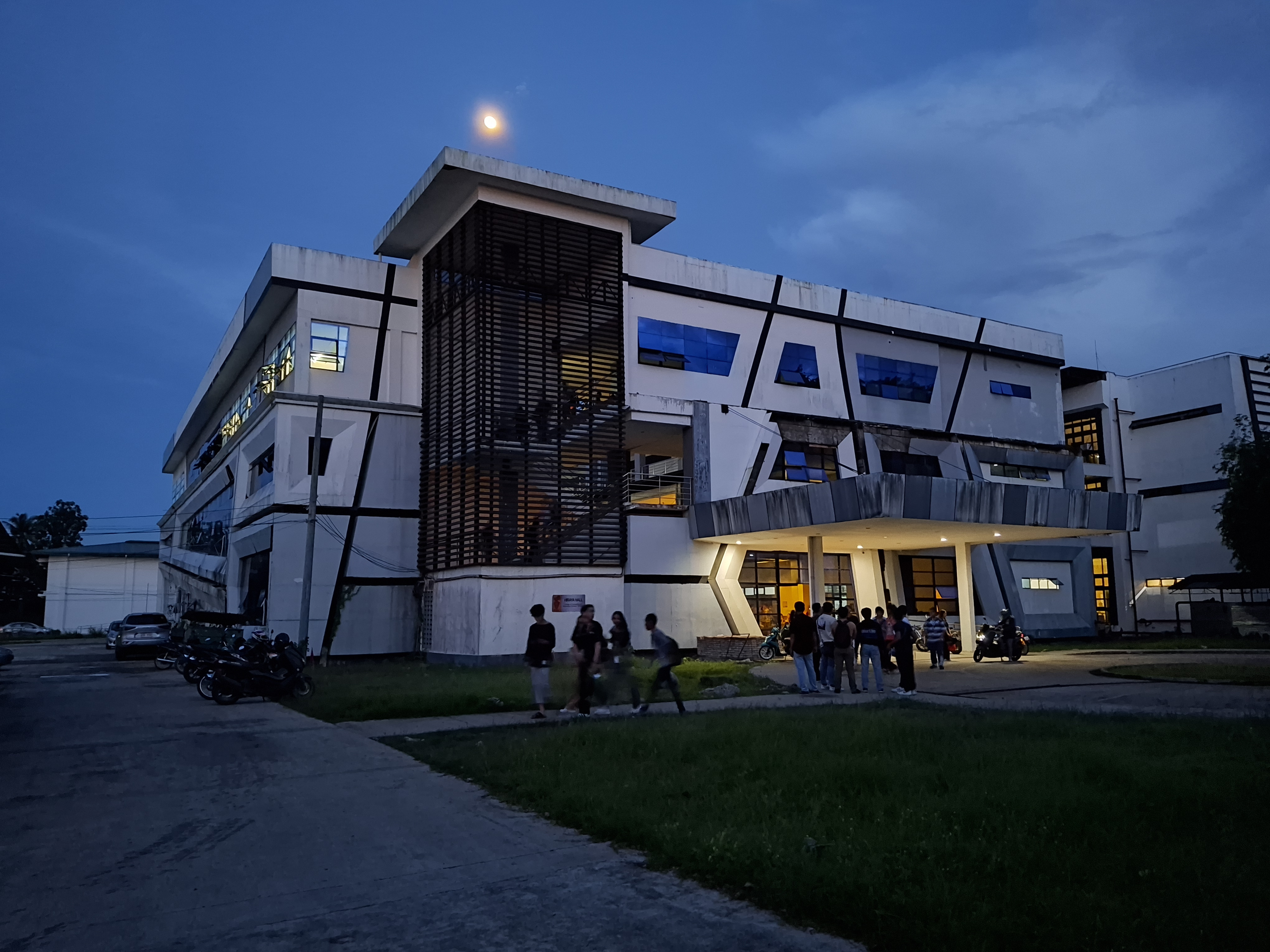
Hiraya Hall houses the College of Computing and Information Sciences (CCIS).

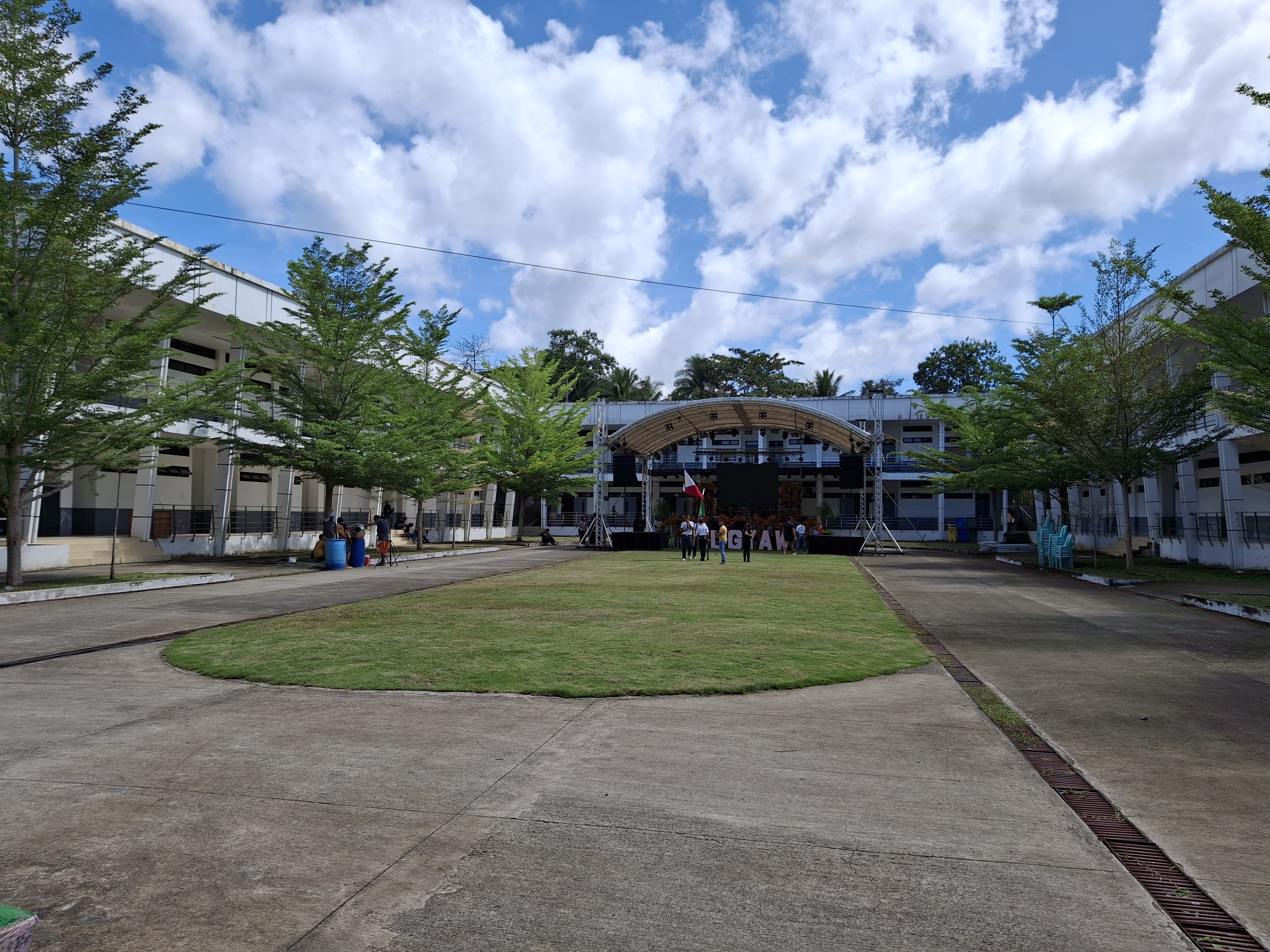
Kinaadman Hall during Hugyaw 2025.
