= Mindanao Institute =

Private school in Agusan del Norte, Philippines

Coordinates: 9°07′16″N 125°32′12″E

Mindanao Institute is a Senior High School in Cabadbaran in the province of Agusan del Norte on the island of Mindanao, Philippines. It provides a general academic education. It was founded in 1946 and is affiliated to the United Church of Christ.

== History ==
After World War II, active laymen of the Cabadbaran United Evangelical Church (now United Church of Christ in the Philippines Cabadbaran Chapter) supported the move led by the Rev. Angel B. Taglucop, then Moderator of the Eastern Mindanao Conference, to establish a school in Cabadbaran.

The idea received full support from Rev. and Mrs. Frank Woodward who lent it impetus by moving their missionary residence to Cabadbaran.

Mindanao Institute was established in June 1946 as a non-stock, non-profit Church-related High-School which was recognized by the government under Recognition No. 166.

The School humbly begun with an initial enrollment of 126 students and by April 1947 graduated 5 students. The residence of Judge and Mrs. Jose R. Villanueva provided the first classrooms, then moved to a larger place in the old Sandigan Building at Magsaysay street, and later transferred to Nipa (Bamboo Structured) Building near the present school which was partly donated and party sold to the United Church of Christ by Mssrs. Celestino Udarbe and Manuel D. Calo. Its first concrete building was constructed in 1948 through 1949 with lumber principally donated by Mr. and Mrs. G.E.C. Mears, of the Nasipit Lumber Company brought to Cabadbaran by the NALCO barges.

In 1953, the school suffered a serious crisis, which was solved through placing its administration under the Mindanao Eastern Conference, Composed of the churches in Surigao and Agusan provinces. Through the help of Rev. Taglucop, Dr. Sanders, and Bishop Rodriguez and Lay Representative Virgilio N. Atega Sr., the Executive Committee of the General Assembly of the United Church of Christ in the Philippines granted the school subsidies for the purchase of the lot of Mr. Udarbe, hiring a Bible Teacher, salaries and laboratory supplies and equipment.

== Scholarships ==
Mindanao Institute offers honor scholarships, and unlimited work and athletic scholarships.

== Finance ==
Approximately 40% of the costs are met by donations, gifts and subsidies from church members, the General Assembly of the United Church of Christ in the Philippines, the school's patrons, alumni, parents, teachers and others. The remainder of the revenue comes from tuition fees. The members of the Board of Trustees serve without pay.
