= Caraga State University – Cabadbaran Campus =

Public university in Agusan del Norte, Philippines

Caraga State University - Cabadbaran Campus
- Type: Public
- Established: 1954
- Chancellor: Marilyn Castillo Ed. D
- Location: Cabadbaran, Agusan del Norte, Philippines; 9°06′57″N 125°32′04″E
- Campus: Cabadbaran
- Website: csucc.edu.ph
- Location in Mindanao Location in the Philippines

The Caraga State University – Cabadbaran Campus (CSU-CC), commonly called the Trades School in Cabadbaran and formerly known as the NORMISIST - Cabadbaran Campus and Northern Mindanao College of Arts, Science, and Technology (NMCAST), is a component college of the Caraga State University (formerly Northern Mindanao State Institute of Science and Technology or abbreviated as NORMISIST), with the main campus located in Butuan. It is a public institution of higher learning run by the Government. It offers pre-elementary and basic education as well as undergraduate and graduate courses, most specializing in technical and vocational programs.

== History ==
CSUCC Admin Building

Agusan Trade School, the old name of Northern Mindanao College of Arts, Science and Technology (NMCAST) was established in Cabadbaran, Agusan del Norte, under Republic Act No. 948 which was approved on June 23, 1953. The school officially opened on July 1, 1954. It offered four trade courses for boys. The school started with 15 teachers and employees and 190 students who were all boys. For a year, classes were held at the Cabadbaran Central School Grandstand. The tools used by students were either borrowed from the elementary shop classes or personally bought by the shop teachers. Alejandro P. Dabuet, the first school principal, ran the school until 1957.

The original school buildings which were made of bamboo slats, coconut trunks and nipa roofing, were gradually replaced with semi-permanent buildings.

Ten years after its establishment, the school was converted into Northern Mindanao School of Arts and Trades (NMSAT) under Republic Act No. 3630. The school was granted permission to open trade-mechanical education courses. The school principal then was Teodolfo Despojo. The principal item was reclassified to Vocational School Administration from 1973 - 1992.

Republic Act No. 7517, which was approved on May 21, 1992, converted the school into Northern Mindanao College of Arts, Science and Technology (NMCAST). With the conversion of the school into a college, two degree courses were initially opened in 1995 in addition to the existing two-year courses. The secondary department was turned into a laboratory school, in accordance with the Commission on Higher Education (CHED) Order No. 4 and 8 thus, there was a gradual decrease in enrollment in the high school until it reached the 500 mark.

From October 2000, the Northern Mindanao College of Arts, Science and Technology (NMCAST) in Cabadbaran was integrated with the Northern Mindanao State Institute of Science and Technology (NORMISIST) and known as the NORMISIST Cabadbaran Campus.

On July 27, 2009, Congress of the Philippines passed into law Republic Act No. 9854, which was subsequently signed by President Gloria Macapagal Arroyo on December 16, 2009, effectively fusing together Northern Mindanao State Institute of Science and Technology in Butuan and Northern Mindanao College of Arts, Science and Technology in Cabadbaran into Caraga State University retaining the Butuan branch at its main campus.

== Academic programs ==
CSUCC Football Field

=== Undergraduate Studies ===
5th year course

- BS in Electrical Engineering (BSEE)
- BS in Industrial Education (BSIEd) major in:
  - Industrial Technology with specialization in:
    - Architectural Drafting
    - Automotive Technology
    - Civil Technology
    - Electrical Technology
    - Electronics Technology
    - Food Technology
    - Garments Technology
    - Furniture and Cabinet Making
    - Vulcanizing Technology
- Bachelor of Science in Industrial Technology (BSInT)
  - with specialization in:
    - Architectural Drafting
    - Automotive Technology
    - Civil Technology
    - Electrical Technology
    - Electronics Technology
    - Food Technology
    - Garments Technology
    - Furniture and Cabinet Making
- Ladderized BS in Industrial Technology

=== Basic Education ===
- Automotive Mechanics
- Building Construction
- Industrial Electricity
- Food Trades
- Furniture and Cabinet Making
- Garment Trades

=== High school ===
- Laboratory High School (LHS)
