= Cabadbaran =

Capital city of Agusan del Norte, Philippines

- Component city
- City of Cabadbaran
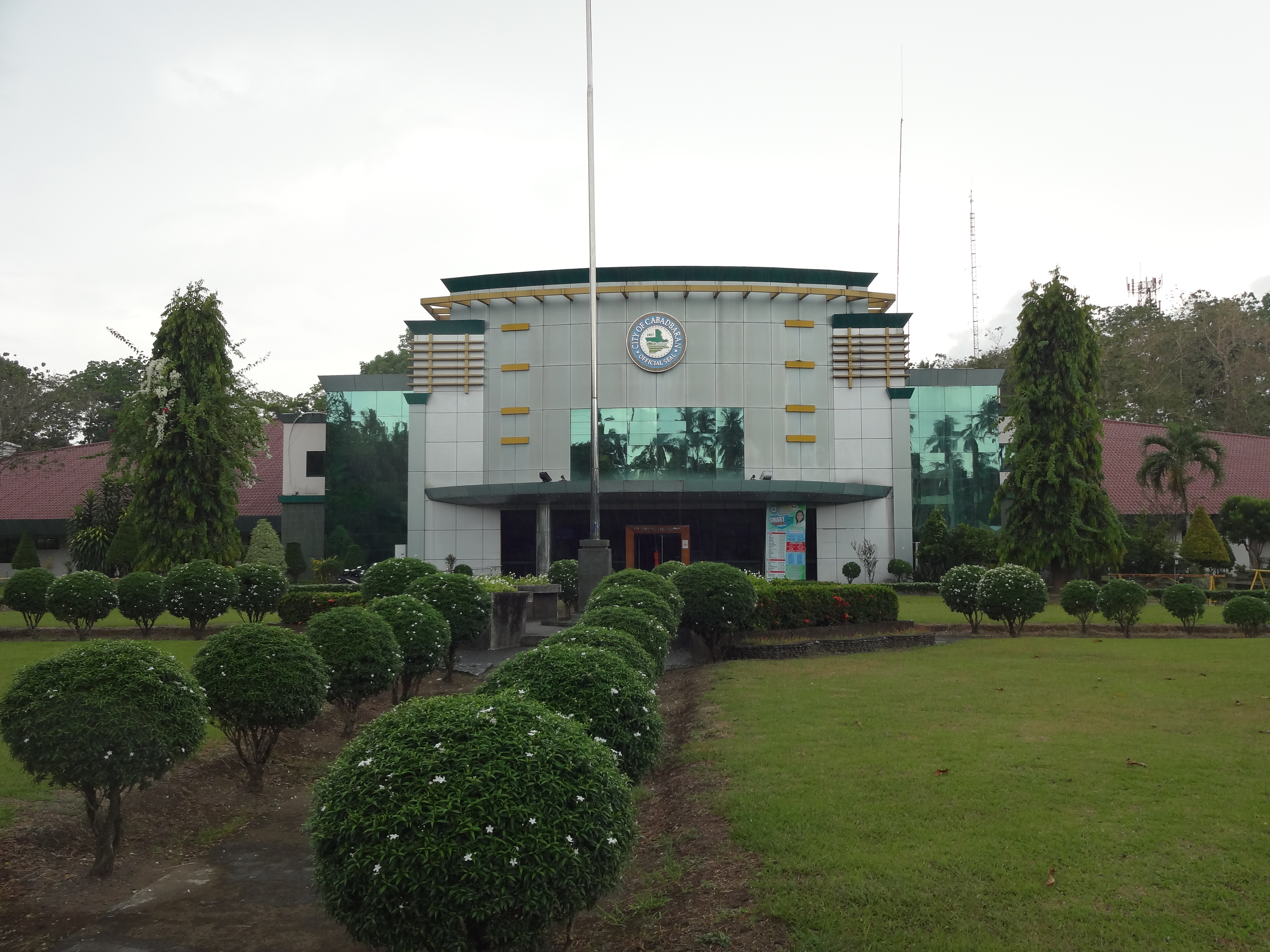
- Cabadbaran City Hall

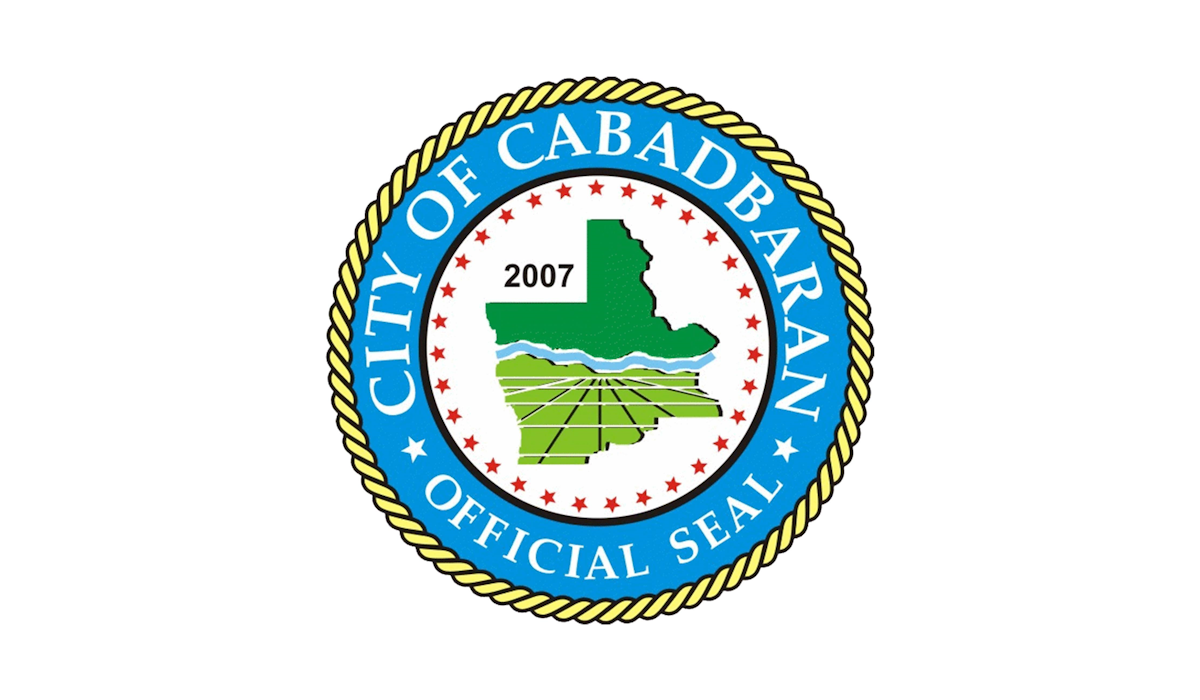
- Flag Seal
- Nickname: City of Golden Hearts
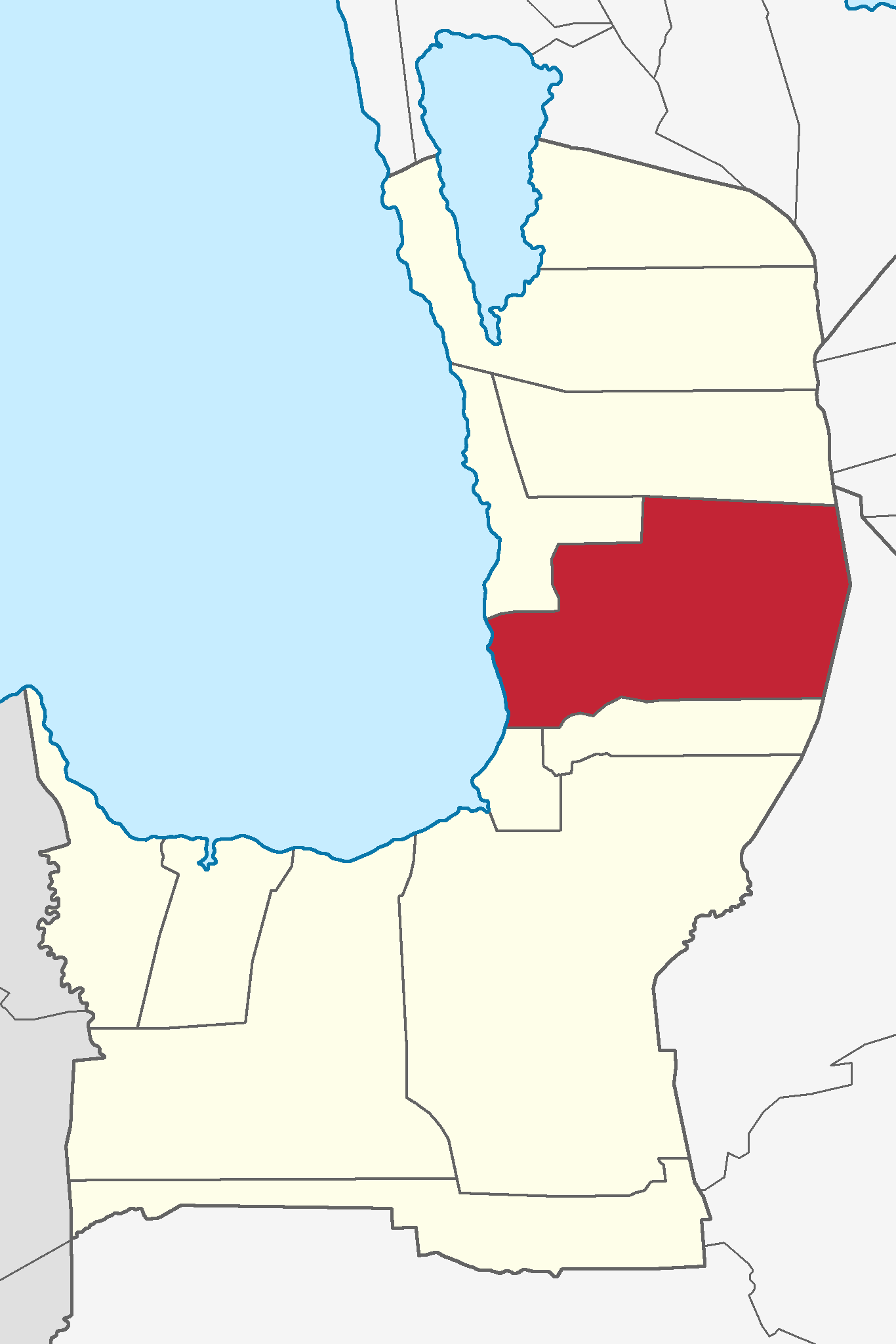
- Map of Agusan del Norte with Cabadbaran highlighted
- Interactive map of Cabadbaran
- Location within the Philippines
- Coordinates: 9°07′N 125°32′E
- Country: Philippines
- Region: Caraga
- Province: Agusan del Norte
- District: Lone district
- Founded: 1894
- Cityhood: July 28, 2007 (Lost cityhood in 2008 and 2010)
- Affirmed Cityhood: February 15, 2011
- Barangays: 31 (see Barangays)

Government
  - Type: Sangguniang Panlungsod
  - Mayor: Judy Amante
  - Vice Mayor: Leo Dale "Jamjam" Corvera
  - Representative: Dale Corvera
  - City Council: Members: Inez Rosario A. Amante; Ruby Mae Christine C. Ayo; John Paul C. Famador; Angel Brian U. Dagani; Florencia S. Dy; Abner P. Caga-anan; Celson A. Sanchez; Judith P. Cueno; Lovejoy B. Quiambao; Doris Paler; Val L. Villanueva; Benefredo Manlubatan; Josh Chin
  - Electorate: 54,597 voters (2025)

Area
  - Total: 214.44 km^{2} (82.80 sq mi)
- Highest elevation: 2,012 m (6,601 ft)
- Lowest elevation: 0 m (0 ft)

Population (2024 census)
  - Total: 82,343
  - Density: 383.99/km^{2} (994.53/sq mi)
  - Households: 19,224

Economy
  - Income class: 3rd city income class
  - Poverty incidence: 15.79% (2023)
  - Revenue: ₱ 1,056 million (2024)
  - Assets: ₱ 3,754 million (2024)
  - Expenditure: ₱ 8,945 million (2024)
  - Liabilities: ₱ 791.7 million (2024)

Service provider
  - Electricity: Agusan del Norte Electric Cooperative (ANECO)
- Time zone: UTC+8 (PST)
- ZIP code: 8605
- PSGC: 160203000
- IDD : area code: +63 (0)85
- Native languages: Agusan; Butuanon; Cebuano; Tagalog; Surigaonon; Higaonon
- Website: www.cabadbaranadn.gov.ph

Cabadbaran, officially the City of Cabadbaran, (Note: Cebuano: Dakbayan sa Cabadbaran) is a component city and capital (Note: Although Cabadbaran is the official (de jure) capital, the provincial government continues to operate out of the old capitol building in Butuan, the former capital, while the transfer of the seat of government and construction of the new capitol in Cabadbaran remains ongoing.) of the province of Agusan del Norte, Philippines. According to the 2024 census, it has a population of 82,343 people.

Founded in 1894, the city rose from its Spanish period beginnings to become the premier town of Agusan del Norte. Its rich cultural heritage is evident in its preserved colonial period houses and its archaeological collections.

On August 16, 2000, the seat of provincial government was transferred from Butuan to Cabadbaran through Republic Act 8811, although the provincial government still holds office in Butuan, pending the actual transfer of provincial offices to the new capital. Cabadbaran was officially declared a city in 2007.

== History ==
=== Spanish period ===
Traces of 12th century villages can be found near the waterways that pass through the territory of Cabadbaran. With the exception of a site in Sanghan where Chinese ceramics from 15th to 16th century were found, no other pre-colonial records have been located.

Cabadbaran was first mentioned by the Spanish as a small village chosen by the Spanish authorities to be turned into a reduction called "La Reunion de Cabarbaran" in 1867. The reduction was mostly populated by people from Southern Agusan. Then in 1879, the reduction was disbanded. The inhabitants of the reduction went back to their places of origin while the remaining migrated to Tubay.

In 1880–1881, the reduction was revived by Father Saturnino Urios, but was named Tolosa to honor Father Urios' hometown in Spain. In 1880, Tolosa was headed by the Teniente del Barrio Don Eduardo Curato. He petitioned to the Spanish authorities for the township application of Tolosa to be approved. On January 31, 1894, the petition was approved. The population and the economy grew, which was driven by agriculture and commerce. But the growth suddenly came to a halt when the revolution against Spain started. No significant turmoil affected the city until the coming of the American forces in 1901.

=== American period ===
When the Americans arrived, Spanish forces were forced to surrender. Included with them was Capt. Andres Atega. Under the Americans, the town was called again as Cabadbaran (according to Don Andres Atega's proposal).

In 1903, the public education system was established with George Bohner as the first American teacher. Public health also improved when Dr. Pedro Malbas was appointed as the Public Health Officer in the 1920s and constructed sanitary toilets, deep wells and drainage canals. Public infrastructure was also improved by the Americans.

Then in the 1935 Constitutional Convention, Apolonio "Oyok" D. Curato, a lawyer, represented Agusan. He then became the Governor and Congressman of the province of Agusan.

The local economy grew when it started producing abaca from coconut plantations established by the Americans. Rice was also grown and remained as staple crop grown in the fields up to this day. The Agusan-Surigao road opened in the 1930s and several bus lines started public service along this route.

=== World War II ===
Cabadbaran had been occupied at one time by those resisting the Japanese occupation of Mindanao. Eventually the Japanese occupied it. On January 17, 1945, combined American and Filipino troops including recognized guerrillas fought a force of Japanese troops on the road between Cabadbaran and Butuan. The Japanese were in the process of reinforcing their garrison at Butuan. The guerrillas retreated when Japanese reinforcements arrived. The guerrillas also had depleted their ammunition.

On March 31, 1945, Major Juan Rivera and a guerrilla detachment attacked the Japanese at Cabadbaran; the Japanese abandoned the post after an hour-long battle.

The general headquarters of the Philippine Commonwealth Army and Philippine Constabulary was active on 1945 to 1946 in Cabadbaran during and aftermath of World War II.

=== Cityhood ===
On July 28, 2007, the municipality Cabadbaran becomes a city in the province of Agusan del Norte after ratification of Republic Act 9434.

The Supreme Court declared the cityhood law of Cabadbaran and 15 other cities unconstitutional after a petition filed by the League of Cities of the Philippines in its ruling on November 18, 2008. On December 22, 2009, the cityhood law of Cabadbaran and 15 other municipalities regain its status as cities again after the court reversed its ruling on November 18, 2008. On August 23, 2010, the court reinstated its ruling on November 18, 2008, causing Cabadbaran and 15 cities to become regular municipalities. Finally, on February 15, 2011, Cabadbaran along with the other 15 municipalities became cities again, declaring that the conversion to cityhood met all legal requirements.

After six years of legal battle, the League of Cities of the Philippines in its board resolution acknowledged and recognized the cityhood of Cabadbaran and the 15 other cities.

== Geography ==
Cabadbaran is in the northeastern part of Mindanao, about 29 kilometres (18 mi) from Butuan.

Its boundaries are Tubay and Santiago to the north, Butuan Bay to the west, Magallanes and R. T. Romualdez to the south, and Sibagat, Agusan del Sur to the east.

It is generally flat with rolling hills and swamplands in its western part. The highest of all mountains in the Caraga region, Mount Hilong-Hilong (with an altitude of 2,012 metres (6,601 ft) above sea level), rises in this city.

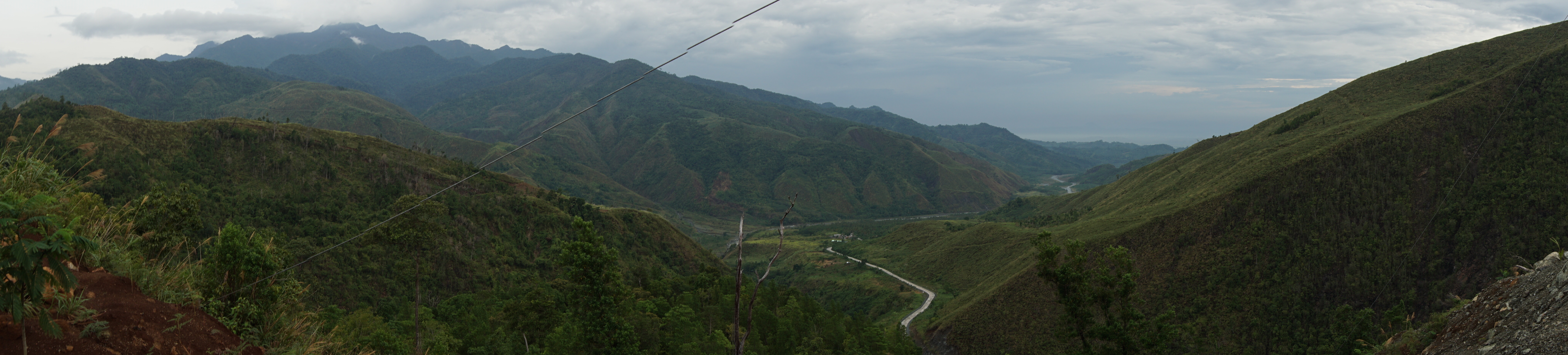
Panoramic view of mountains at Puting Bato

=== Climate ===
Climate data for Cabadbaran, Agusan del Norte
Month	Jan	Feb	Mar	Apr	May	Jun	Jul	Aug	Sep	Oct	Nov	Dec	Year
Mean daily maximum °C (°F)	27 (81)	28 (82)	28 (82)	30 (86)	30 (86)	30 (86)	30 (86)	30 (86)	30 (86)	30 (86)	29 (84)	28 (82)	29 (84)
Mean daily minimum °C (°F)	23 (73)	23 (73)	23 (73)	23 (73)	24 (75)	25 (77)	24 (75)	25 (77)	25 (77)	24 (75)	24 (75)	24 (75)	24 (75)
Average precipitation mm (inches)	277 (10.9)	211 (8.3)	155 (6.1)	109 (4.3)	166 (6.5)	191 (7.5)	154 (6.1)	138 (5.4)	127 (5.0)	173 (6.8)	241 (9.5)	231 (9.1)	2,173 (85.5)
Average rainy days	22.7	19.1	20.0	19.9	25.9	27.6	27.6	26.1	25.1	26.8	24.3	23.2	288.3
Source: Meteoblue (modeled/calculated data, not measured locally)

The city belongs to the Second Climatic Type of the Corona Classification. No definite dry season in the place and maximum rainfall occurs from October to January. The average rainfall is 171.29 millimetres (6.744 in) per month, average annual temperature 28 °C (82 °F).

=== Barangays ===
Cabadbaran is politically subdivided into 31 barangays. Each barangay consists of puroks while some have sitios.

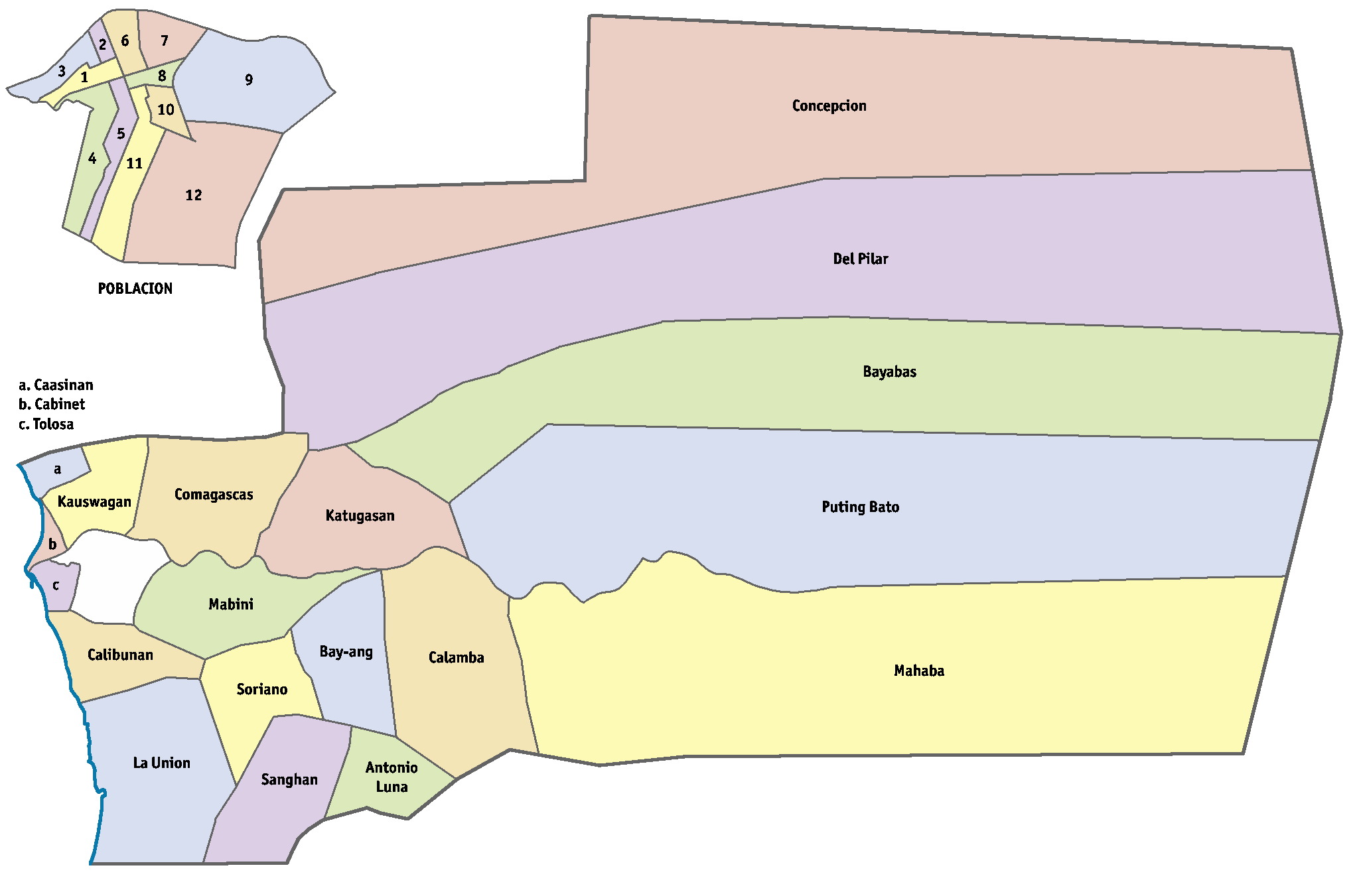
Political map of Cabadbaran

PSGC	Barangay	Population			±% p.a.	
		2024		2010		
160203002	Antonio Luna	1.6%	1,335	1,224	▴	0.60%
160203005	Bay-ang	1.9%	1,580	1,435	▴	0.66%
160203006	Bayabas	1.9%	1,573	1,223	▴	1.75%
160203007	Caasinan	2.4%	2,016	1,211	▴	3.57%
160203009	Cabinet	2.6%	2,130	1,745	▴	1.38%
160203010	Calamba	3.5%	2,878	2,972	▾	−0.22%
160203011	Calibunan	5.0%	4,139	3,288	▴	1.59%
160203012	Comagascas	5.0%	4,146	3,257	▴	1.67%
160203013	Concepcion	1.4%	1,137	1,076	▴	0.38%
160203014	Del Pilar	7.5%	6,181	4,853	▴	1.68%
160203016	Katugasan	1.8%	1,485	1,396	▴	0.43%
160203017	Kauswagan	4.2%	3,480	2,561	▴	2.13%
160203018	La Union	9.0%	7,400	5,917	▴	1.55%
160203019	Mabini	8.1%	6,661	5,285	▴	1.60%
160203021	Poblacion 1	1.0%	789	966	▾	−1.38%
160203025	Poblacion 2	0.7%	607	582	▴	0.29%
160203026	Poblacion 3	2.8%	2,306	2,459	▾	−0.44%
160203027	Poblacion 4	2.1%	1,745	1,556	▴	0.79%
160203028	Poblacion 5	1.2%	988	822	▴	1.27%
160203029	Poblacion 6	1.5%	1,262	1,479	▾	−1.08%
160203030	Poblacion 7	2.8%	2,275	2,429	▾	−0.45%
160203031	Poblacion 8	0.4%	362	557	▾	−2.92%
160203032	Poblacion 9	4.6%	3,797	3,578	▴	0.41%
160203022	Poblacion 10	0.7%	547	481	▴	0.89%
160203023	Poblacion 11	0.7%	552	641	▾	−1.02%
160203024	Poblacion 12	3.0%	2,471	2,189	▴	0.84%
160203033	Puting Bato	4.1%	3,362	2,297	▴	2.65%
160203037	Sanghan	4.0%	3,258	2,976	▴	0.62%
160203038	Soriano	2.6%	2,170	1,719	▴	1.61%
160203040	Tolosa	7.3%	5,998	5,817	▴	0.21%
160203041	Mahaba	2.1%	1,724	1,250	▴	2.23%
	Total		82,343	69,241	▴	1.20%

== Demographics ==
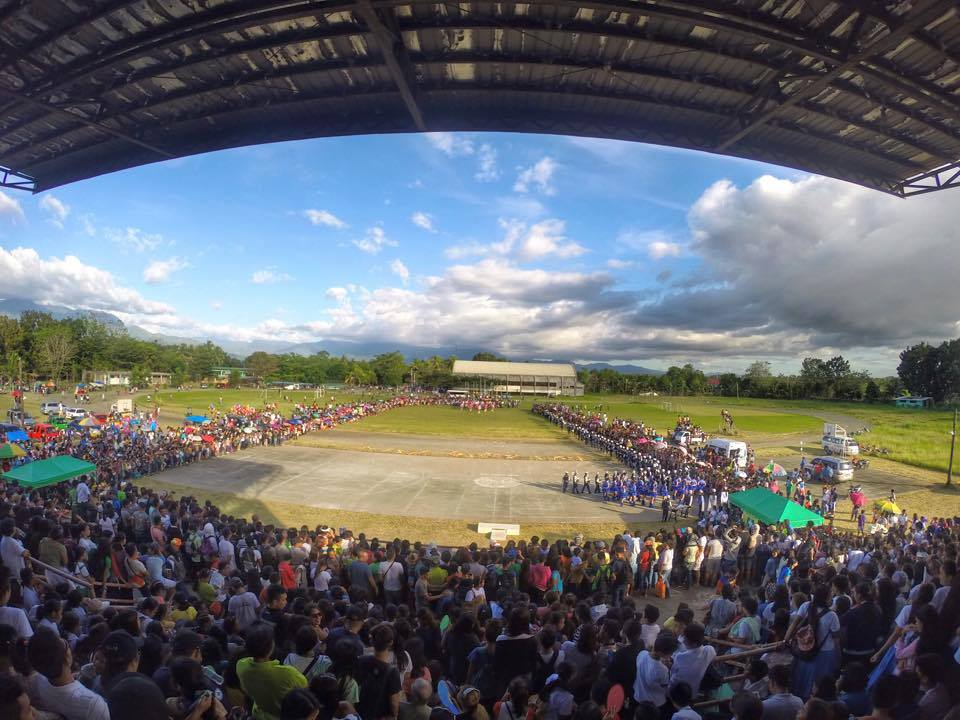
Cabadbaran grounds during a fiesta

Population census of Cabadbaran

Year	Pop.	±% p.a.
1903	2,737	—
1918	10,921	+9.66%
1939	20,254	+2.98%
1948	18,886	−0.77%
1960	26,216	+2.77%
1970	34,729	+2.85%

Year	Pop.	±% p.a.
1975	36,770	+1.15%
1980	42,695	+3.03%
1990	46,370	+0.83%
1995	51,905	+2.14%
2000	55,006	+1.25%
2007	61,564	+1.57%

Year	Pop.	±% p.a.
2010	69,241	+4.37%
2015	73,639	+1.18%
2020	80,354	+1.85%
2024	82,343	+0.59%

Source: Philippine Statistics Authority

=== Language ===
The entirety of Cabadbaran speaks Cebuano. There are also significant number of people who speak Surigaonon, for these people have lived or have ancestries from the northern municipalities and speak in a variety of the Jabonganon, Mainitnon and Gigaquitnon dialects of the Surigaonon language. English and Filipino are also widely spoken, while Ilocano, Hiligaynon, Waray, Manobo languages, Butuanon, Boholano dialect, Maguindanaon, Maranao and Tausug also have significant speakers in the area.

== Economy ==
Poverty incidence of Cabadbaran (%)

Source: Philippine Statistics Authority

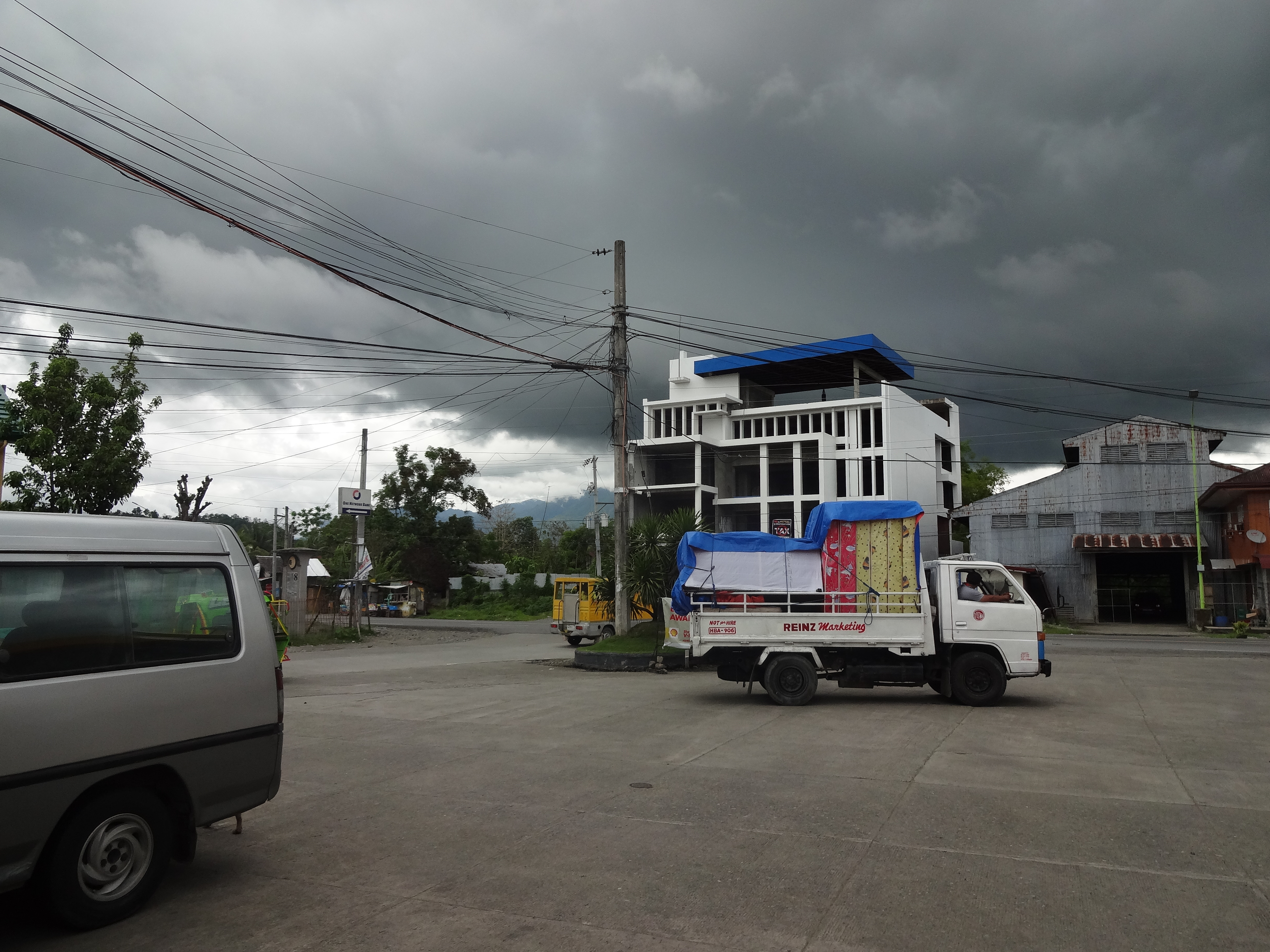
The Baug Carp Beneficiaries Multi-Purpose Cooperative (BCBMPC) Cabadbaran Branch

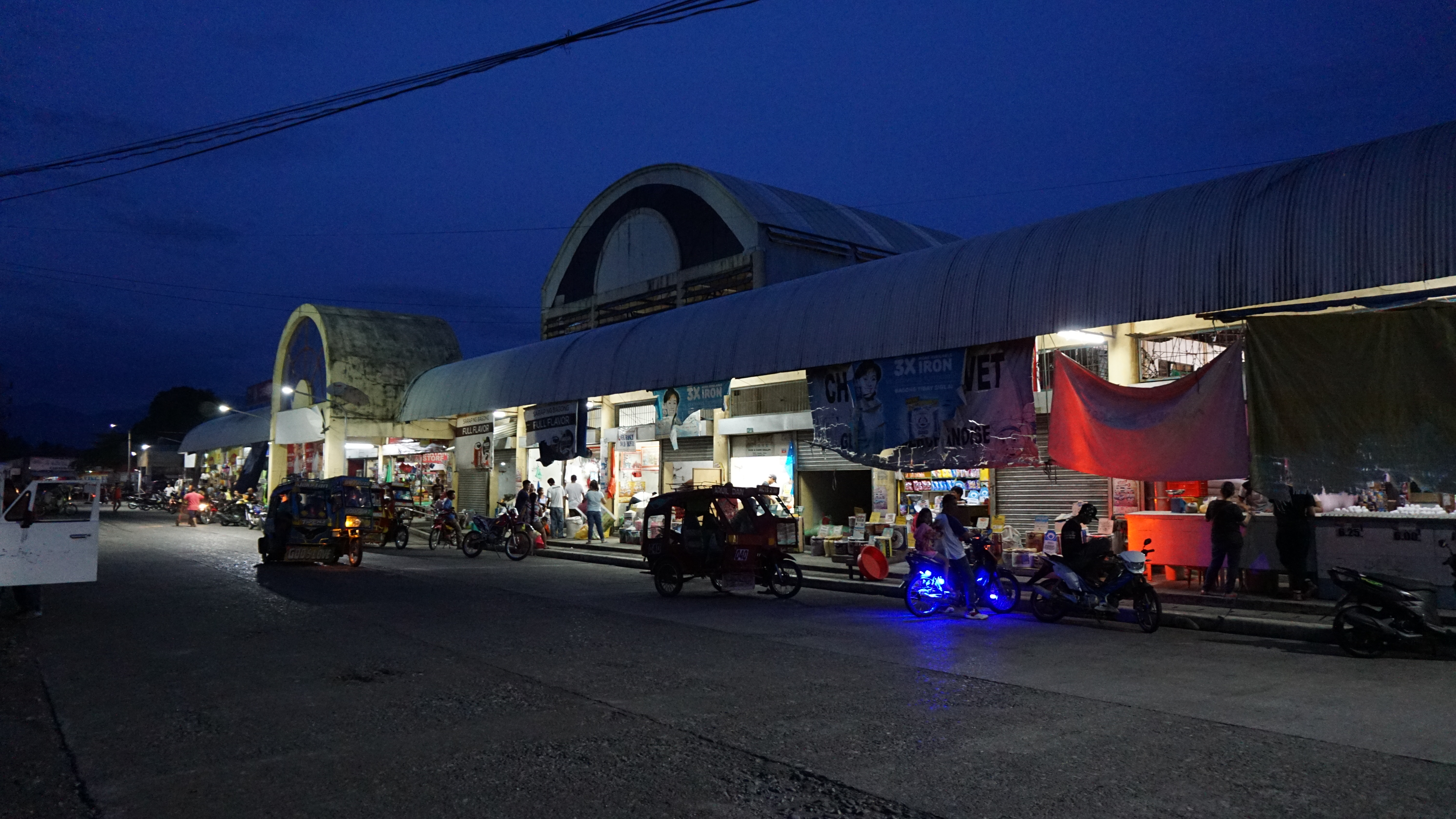
Cabadbaran Public Market

Cabadbaran produces several agricultural crops such as rice, corn, coconut, abaca, banana, and mango. The city has the biggest area planted with coconuts in Agusan del Norte with 18.46% of the total land area planted with the crop.

Cabadbaran has a booming economy based on agriculture, commerce and trade. It also has varied ecotourism destinations such as Caraga's highest peak, mile-long tunnels and adventure tourism sites.

== Tourism ==
Like other popular destinations situated in neighboring provinces, Cabadbaran has a growing ecotourism industry. Annual climbs to reach Caraga's highest peak Mt. Hilong-Hilong (2,012 meters above sea level) has been organized by trekkers and mountaineers, there are also organized climbs to Mt. Mas-ai, a plateau located in Putting Bato which has a mountain top lake. Locals have also put up white water tubing adventures along Cabadbaran River including rappelling at some of the steep falls located at the foot of Mt. Hilong-hilong. Mt. Pongkay, which is a hill that can be seen from the city proper, can be a great destination for families who wants to experience the value of the Holy Week's penance and devotion. It is also a destination for mountain climbers and for those people who wants to see the panoramic view of Agusan del Norte and Butuan Bay.

Cabadbaran also has cheap inland pools used by local residents as an alternative to inland resorts. Many of these pools have sprouted through the years because of Cabadbaran's abundant fresh water supply which the city is known for. The city is also a beach destination for people from neighboring municipalities because of its crystal clear water and gray sandy beaches. The city has multiple hotels as well like Loreta's, Gazebo, and Casa Alburo.

Although Cabadbaran does not yet have any mainstream fast food restaurants, the city has various restaurants that offers Filipino, Japanese, and Chinese cuisine that serve an alternative to people who want to have their fine dining locally rather than in the neighboring Butuan.

== Culture ==
=== Festivals and celebrations ===
- Charter Day Celebration - held annually every July 28 to commemorate the cityhood of Cabadbaran.
- Dagkot Festival - It is the sole important event during the fiesta celebration of Cabadbaran City. The weeklong festivity features socio-civic activities, sporting events, trade fairs and capped by a grand street dancing parade and competition to celebrate the historic past and the bright future that awaits the city also in honor of Nuestra Seniora de Candelaria.
- Musikainan Food and Music Festival - It is a celebrational tribute to the city's "culture and history as well as the local's cooking tradition".

== Government ==
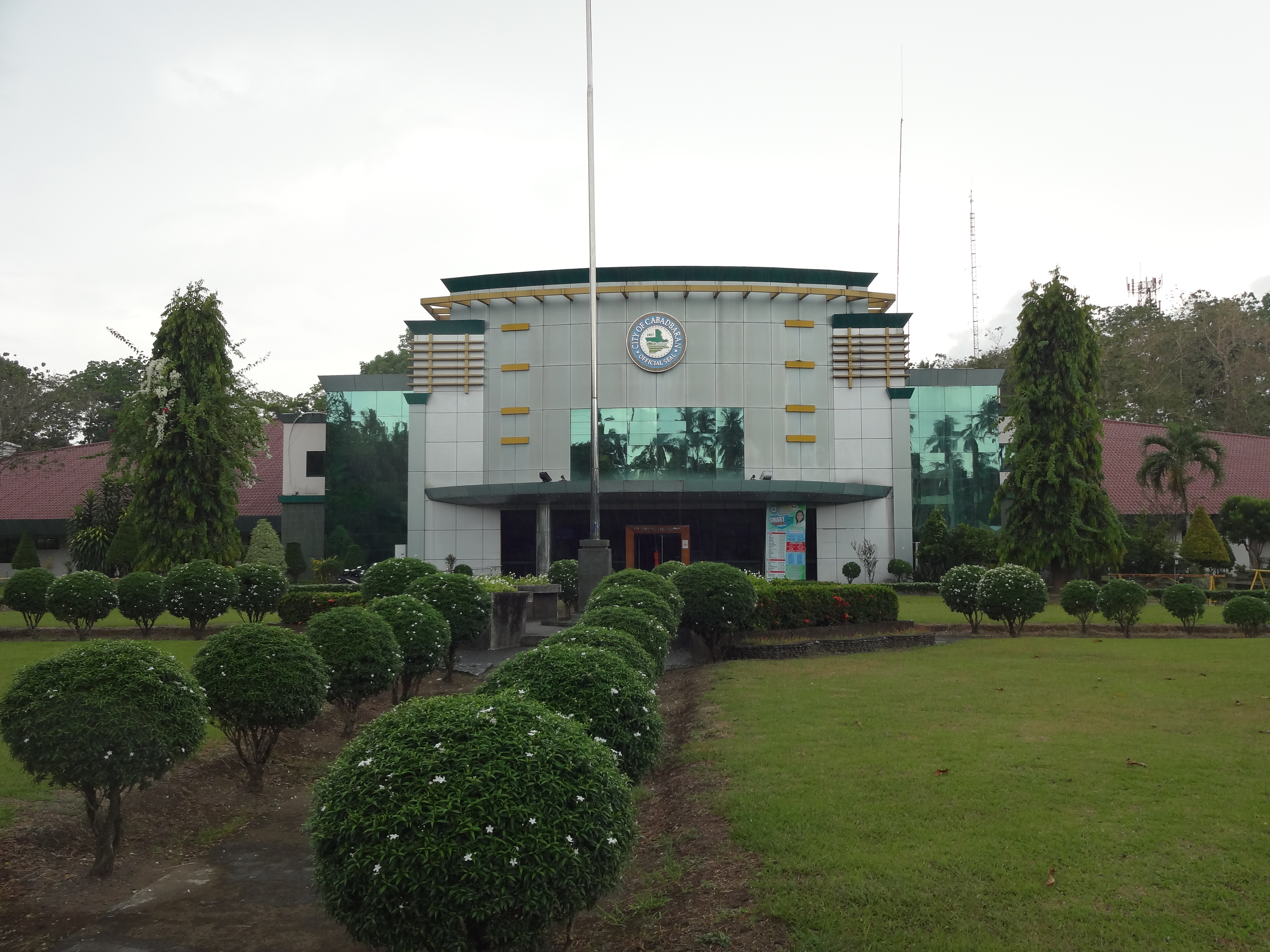
Cabadbaran City Hall

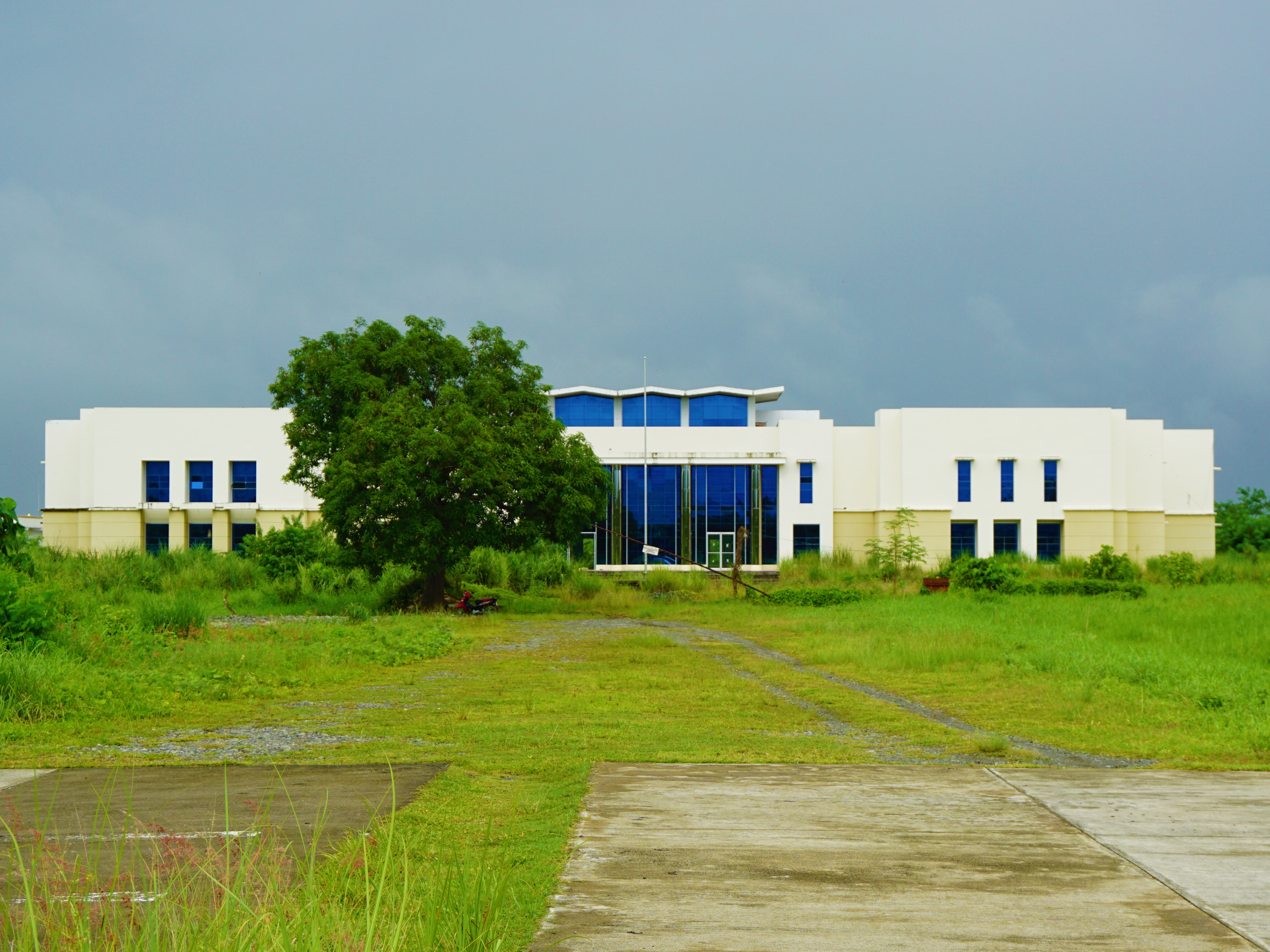
Proposed new Agusan del Norte provincial capitol building (ongoing construction)

=== Provincial Seat of Government ===
After the Provincial Government of Agusan del Norte attains the reclassification of their land conducted by the Department of Agriculture in Barangay Sanghan, Cabadbaran City where the new Capitol building will be constructed, land conversion by the Department of Agrarian Reform will soon follow. The new Capitol will feature a modern design, including an employees village at the back of the new building intended for the provincial employees.

=== List of mayors ===
The list of mayors that took office in Cabadbaran starting in 1896.

- Eduardo M. Curato * – 1896-1902
- Luis L. Cabrera – 1904-1905
- Mariano Alaan – 1906-1908
- Antonio C. Dagani – 1908-1909
- Adolfo C. Mortola – 1910-1911
- Fabian B. Monteroso – 1912-1913
- Angel M. Manlapaz – 1917-1919
- Saturnino D. Curato – 1919-1924
- Fidel C. Dagani – 1925-1928
- Fabian D. Mora – 1928-1931; 1938-1940
- Jose Baylin – 1932-1934
- Servano S. Jongko – 1935-1936
- Regino J. Batitang – 1936-1938
- Felixberto Curato Dagani – 1941-early 1942; 1963-1985
- Pedro Mariveles Malbas – early-Sept 1942
- Virgilio Noja Atega Sr – Oct 1942-May 1943
- Alejo P. Rabuya – 1945-1951
- Leonardo R. Corvera – 1951
- Teofilo D. Curato – 1952-1959
- Julio Carlon – 1959-1960
- Basilisa Atega-Kittilstvedt – 1960-1963
- Bienvenido C. Milan – 1963
- Alan M. Famador – 1985-1986
- Abelardo M. Carloto – 1986-1992
- Ernie M. Ceniza – 1987
- Rosario M. Amante – 1992-2001
- Herman M. Libarnes – 2001-2007
- Dale B. Covera ** – 2007-2016
- Katrina Marie O. Mortola – 2016–2019
- Judy Amante – 2019–present

_{*The first municipal mayor.}
_{**The first city mayor.}

== Transportation ==
=== By land ===
Cabadbaran City is accessible by bus from Bachelor Express, Davao Metro Shuttle, or Surigao Bus via Butuan-Surigao routes or vice versa. There are also vans, jeep and multi-cabs that have routes towards both Surigao City and Butuan which are stationed in the City Transport Terminal.

Accredited Transport Cooperative:

- Agusan del Norte PUV Transport Service Cooperative

=== By air and sea ===
Currently the city has neither seaports nor airports. Cabadbaran can be reached by air from Manila and Cebu via Butuan which is 30 kilometers away. From the Visayas, it can be accessed via the Nasipit Municipal Port in Nasipit, Agusan del Norte (60 km) or via the Lipata Port and Verano International Port both in Surigao City (79 km) through the Maharlika Highway.

== Education ==
There are the list of the different schools within the city of Cabadbaran.

=== Public elementary schools ===
- Alfonso B. Dagani Elementary School
- Ansili Elementary School
- Antonio C. Dagani Elementary School
- Antonio Luna Elementary School
- Bay-ang Elementary School
- Bayabas Elementary School
- Caasinan Elementary School
- Cabadbaran South Central Elementary School
- Cabinet Elementary School
- Calamba Elementary School
- Calibunan Elementary School
- Comagascas Elementary School
- Concepcion Elementary School
- Dagnasay Elementary School
- Del Pilar Central Elementary School
- Francisco C. Jongko Elementary School
- Katugasan Elementary School
- La Union Elementary School
- Lusong Elementary School
- Masundong Elementary School
- North Cabadbaran Central Elementary School
- Palidan Elementary School
- Pirada Elementary School
- Puting Bato Elementary School
- Soriano Elementary School

=== Secondary education ===
==== Public secondary and senior high schools ====
- Cabadbaran City National High School
- Calamba National High School
- Del Pilar National High School
- Francisco C. Jongko National High School
- La Union National High School
- La Union Senior High School (Stand Alone)
- North Cabadbaran Central Elementary School Integrated School (Evening Opportunity High School)
- Puting Bato National High School

==== Public integrated schools ====
- Chief Justice Ramon Avancena Integrated School
- Mahaba Integrated School
- Sanghan Integrated School
- Comagascas integrated school

==== Private schools ====
- Agape Christian Academy
- Bishop Haden Institute, Inc.
- Cabadbaran City Baptist Academy, Inc.
- Candelaria Institute of Technology of Cabadbaran, Inc.
- Mindanao Institute
- Montessori de Cabadbaran
- Northern Mindanao Colleges Inc.
- Oaktree Christian Preschool Inc.
- Rafael A. Mondejar Memorial College
- Rainbow Speechworld Learning Center, Inc.
- St. Aloysius Learning Center of Cabadbaran, Inc
- Tolosa Christian School, Inc.
- Trailblazer Study Center, Inc.
- Zion Children's Day Care Center

=== Tertiary education ===
Candelaria Institute

==== Private colleges ====
- Northern Mindanao Colleges Inc.
- Candelaria Institute of Technology of Cabadbaran, Inc.
- Rafael A. Mondejar Memorial College

==== Public university ====
- Caraga State University - Cabadbaran Campus

== Notable personalities ==
- Soledad Duterte - a Filipino teacher and activist, known as the mother of President Rodrigo Duterte
- Edelmiro Amante - former Executive Secretary, Congressman, Assemblyman and Presidential Consultant for Mindanao Flagship Projects
- Erlpe John Amante - former Governor and former Representative. In 2014, he was awarded as Outstanding Filipino Achiever in Public Service by the Golden Globe Annual Awards for Business Excellence
- Maria Angelica Rosedell Amante - born in Cabadbaran City, current Representative and former governor.

== Sister cities ==
- Makati, Philippines
- Naga, Cebu, Philippines
- Batac, Philippines
