= League of Cities of the Philippines =

Philippine organization

- Liga ng mga Siyudad
- Headquarters: 7th Floor, Unit J and K, Cyberone Building, Eastwood Avenue, Bagumbayan, Quezon City
- Members: 149 (as of July 8, 2023)
- National President: Francis Zamora
- National Chairperson: Joy Belmonte
- Website: www.lcp.org.ph

The League of Cities of the Philippines (LCP), also known simply as the League of Cities, is a formal organization of all cities in the Philippines. As of July 8, 2023, there are 149 cities which are part of the organization.

== Statutory Basis ==
Its creation and purpose is mandated by Section 499 of the Republic Act 7160, otherwise known as the Local Government Code of 1991, as amended, which states:

There shall be an organization of all cities to be known as the League of Cities for the primary purpose of ventilating, articulating and crystallizing issues affecting city government administration, and securing, through proper and legal means, solutions thereto.

== Mission ==
The league as the following mission statement:

1. To foster unity and cooperation among all cities in the country
2. To promote the interest and welfare of its members
3. To provide a cohesive force that embodies the sentiments and aspirations of its members and advocates the principles, among others, of enhanced devolution and decentralization, integrated development planning, coordination of basic services between the national government and the cities as well as between cities, and democratization of participation, representation and resources in local governance
4. To serve as a forum of discussion and a feedback mechanism on policies affecting city governments
5. To collaborate with national and other local government agencies in attaining efficient and effective inter-government relations to provide development programs that will enrich and upgrade the capabilities of city governments
6. Develop and implement both as bodies of governance and development entities

== Vision ==
Meanwhile, the league has the following vision statement:

An organization of cities united and committed to genuine and effective local autonomy and development, with democratic access to all available resources.

== Representation ==
Each city is represented in the League by their city mayor. In case of his absence or incapacity, the vice mayor or a sanggunian member of the city shall be its representative after being elected for this purpose by its members.

== Chapters ==
The League is organized into provincial and national chapters. Highly urbanized cities also form their own distinct chapter. Every chapter has the following set of officers:

- President
- Vice President
- Board of directors

The board of directors has the power to create any other position needed to properly manage their respective chapter.

A secretary-general is chosen from among the national league members and is tasked to manage the daily activities of the national league.

== Powers, Functions, and Duties ==
Section 501 of the Local Government Code of 1991 outlines the following powers, functions and duties of the League:

- Assist the national government in the formulation and implementation of the policies, programs and projects affecting cities as a whole;
- Promote local autonomy at the city level;
- Adopt measures for the promotion of the welfare of all cities and its officials and employees;
- Encourage people's participation in local government administration in order to promote united and concerted action for the attainment of country-wide development goals;
- Supplement the efforts of the national government in creating opportunities for gainful employment the cities;
- Give priority to programs designed for the total development of cities in consonance with the policies, programs and projects of the national government;
- Serve as a forum for crystallizing and expressing ideas, seeking the necessary assistance of the national government and providing the private sector avenues for cooperation in the promotion of the welfare of the cities; and
- Exercise such other powers and perform such other duties and functions as the league may prescribe for the welfare of the cities.

== Funding ==
The league is funded by contributions of its member local government units and/or by any fund raising activity that they organize. These funds shall be deposited to the treasurer as trust funds and is subjected to pertinent accounting and auditing rules. Chapter funds are considered separated and distinct from national funds.

== See also ==
- List of micro-regional organizations
