= 1991 in the Philippines =

- Decades: 1970s; 1980s; 1990s; 2000s; 2010s
- See also: List of years in the Philippines; films

1991 in the Philippines details events of note that happened in the Philippines in the year 1991.

== Incumbents ==
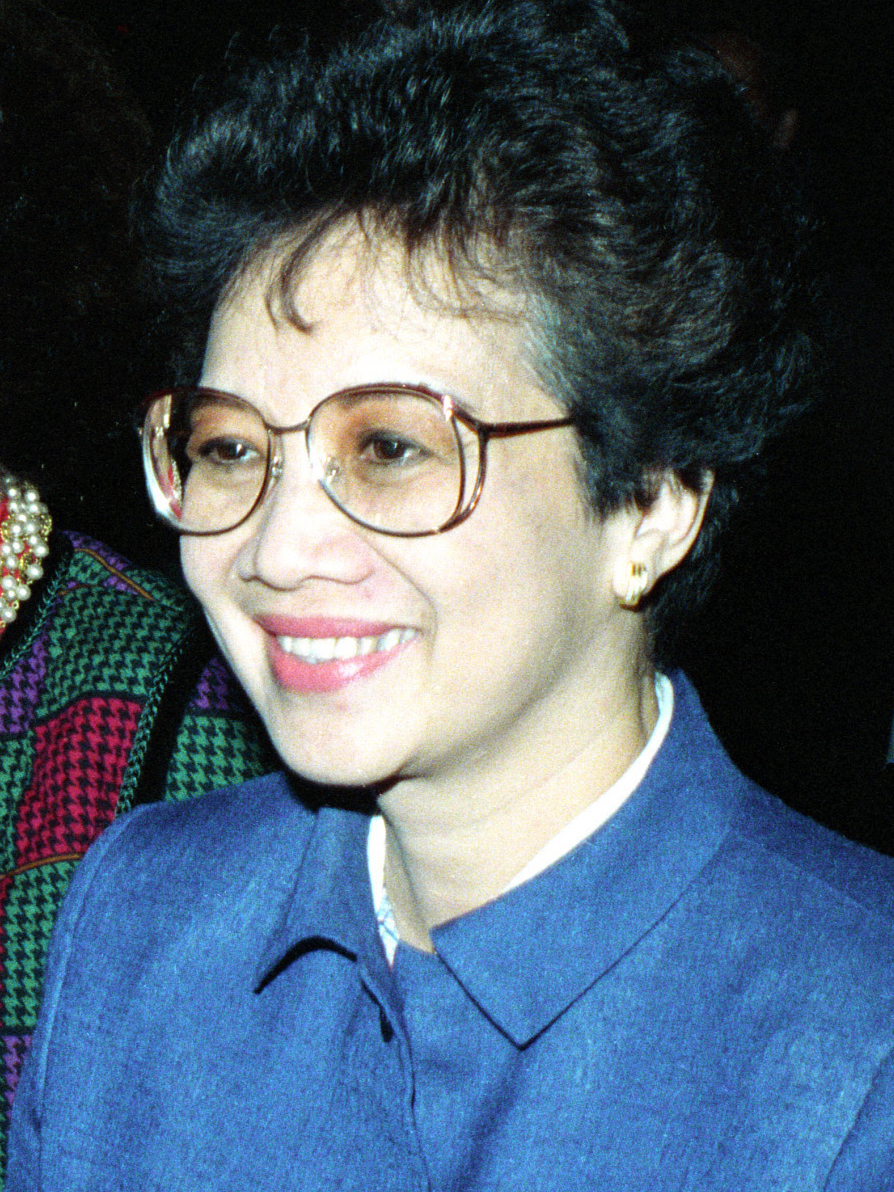
Corazon S.
Aquino

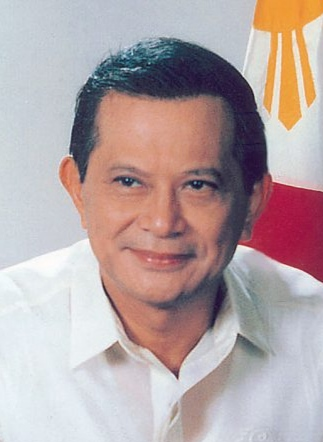
Salvador H.
Laurel

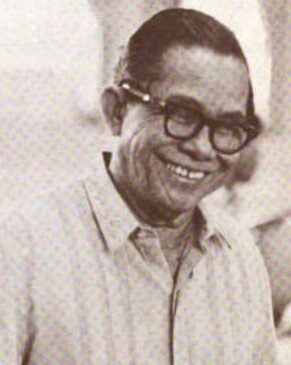
Jovito R.
Salonga

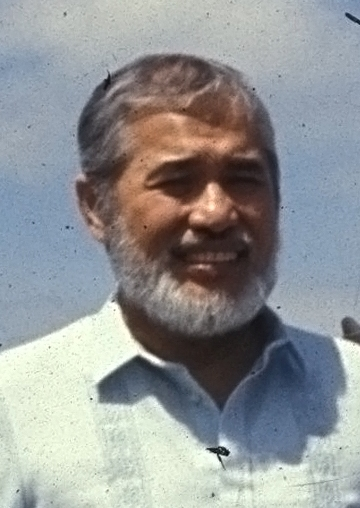
Ramon V.
Mitra Jr.

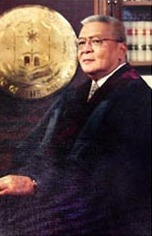
Andres D.
Narvasa

- President: Corazon Aquino (PDP-Laban)
- Vice President: Salvador Laurel (Nacionalista)
- President of the Senate: Jovito Salonga
- Speaker of the House of Representatives: Ramon Mitra, Jr.
- Chief Justice:
  - Marcelo Fernan (until December 6)
  - Andres Narvasa (starting December 6)
- Philippine Congress: 8th Congress of the Philippines

== Events ==
=== January ===
- January 1 – Rodolfo Calzado, a former air force colonel who have been convicted for his involvement in a 1987 coup attempt and escaped from a military jail in 1989, is captured by the military in Manila.
- January 17 – Former Lt. Col. Billy Bibit, one of the leaders of the 1989 coup attempt who have been escaped from jail about nine months prior, is arrested by military agents in Alabang, Muntinlupa.
- January 19 – A bomb attack on the Thomas Jefferson Cultural Center in Makati failed, leaving one attacker dead.
- January 29 – The Philippine Constabulary and the Integrated National Police are merged to form the Philippine National Police.

=== February ===
- February 4 – Charges are filed by the government against rebel leader, army colonel Gregorio Honasan, and 31 other individuals under a new law, which have been effective since January and severely punishes coup plotters, increasing the prison sentence from 12 to 40 years. By that time, five of them are in custody.
- February 6 – Rebel former military officers Maj. Abraham Purugganan, spokesperson and one of the founders of the Young Officers' Union, and Lt. Col. Victor Batac, chief propagandist of the Alliance of the People's Revolution, who have been involved in coup attempts in 1987 and in 1989, are captured separately in Makati. On February 7, Purugganan, among those convicted in 1990 in relation to a 1987 uprising, is sentenced by a general court-martial to 12 years imprisonment.
- February 10 – Lenny Villa, a first-year Ateneo Law student, dies of serious physical injuries after three days of bloody hazing rites by the members of Aquila Legis fraternity.

=== June ===
- June 10 – About 15,000 Americans are evacuated from Clark Air Base as Pinatubo eruption begins.
- June 15 – Mount Pinatubo erupts, the peak of series of major explosions on June 12–16, in what will be the second largest terrestrial eruption of the 20th century; volcano's alert level has been raised to the highest, June 9; Typhoon Yunya further worsens lahar flows and ashfalls causing collapse of roofs on structures that contribute to about 350 of 847 deaths. The eruption costs US$700-million in total damages.
- June 28 – SM Megamall is opened as the third SM Supermall in the Philippines.
- June 30 – Three members of Vizconde family are murdered at their home in Parañaque. The case becomes controversial as eight sons of prominent families are involved. The Supreme Court in 2010 would reverse the 2000 conviction of six of them, including Hubert Webb; the rest are still at large. A policeman, also convicted, would be sentenced to a prison term.

=== July ===
- July 2 - Eldon Maguan, an engineering student at De La Salle University, is shot in the head by Rolito Go in a road rage incident in San Juan, Metro Manila. Go was convicted of frustrated homicide, which was elevated to murder after Maguan died of his wounds days after. Go was eventually sentenced to reclusión perpetua only to escape and be re-arrested on multiple occasions from 1994 to 2012. He was eventually released from prison in 2016 upon completion of his sentence.
- July 13 – Maureen Hultman and John Chapman are murdered by Claudio Teehankee, Jr. The case was controversial as Teehankee is the son of a former Chief Justice.

=== September ===
- September 16 – The Senate, by a 12–11 vote, rejects the proposed RP-US Treaty of Friendship, Cooperation and Peace, which would have extended American military presence at Subic Bay Naval Base. American troops earlier abandoned Clark Air Base after Pinatubo erupted, and completed their withdrawal from Subic in 1992.

=== October ===
- October 10 – The Local Government Code, by virtue of Republic Act No. 7160, is signed into law.

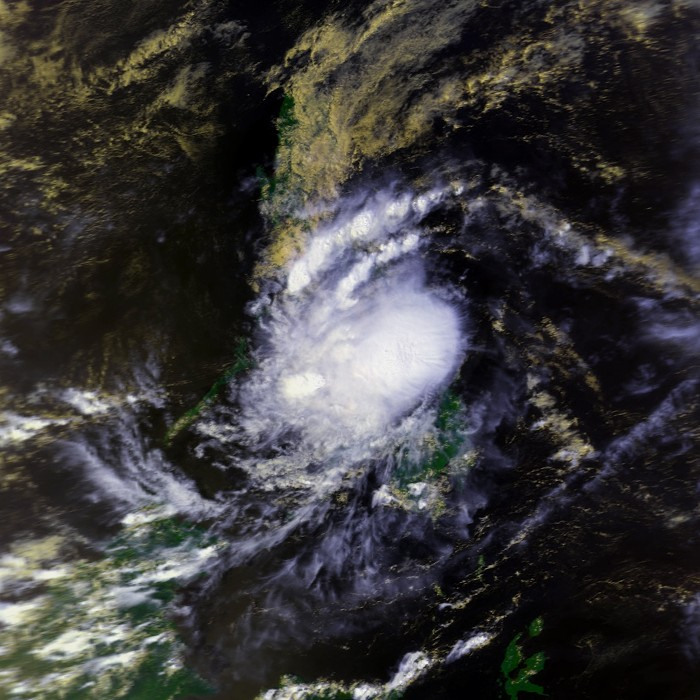
Thelma while nearly stationary on November 5

=== November ===
- November 3 – Former First Lady Imelda Marcos returns to the country to face charges against her.
- November 4–5 – Tropical Storm Uring lashes into Eastern Visayas, leaving 8,000 people dead as a result of widespread flooding in the coastal city of Ormoc, Leyte.
- November 27 – US closes and surrenders Clark Air Base.

== Holidays ==
As per Executive Order No. 292, chapter 7 section 26, the following are regular holidays and special days, approved on July 25, 1987. Note that in the list, holidays in bold are "regular holidays" and those in italics are "nationwide special days".

- January 1 – **New Year's Day**
- March 28 – **Maundy Thursday**
- March 29 – **Good Friday**
- April 9 – **Araw ng Kagitingan** (Day of Valor)
- May 1 – **Labor Day**
- June 12 – **Independence Day**
- August 25 – **National Heroes Day**
- November 1 – All Saints Day
- November 30 – **Bonifacio Day**
- December 25 – **Christmas Day**
- December 30 – **Rizal Day**
- December 31 – Last Day of the Year

In addition, several other places observe local holidays, such as the foundation of their town. These are also "special days."

== Television ==
These are TV programs that premiered and had their finales this year.

=== Premieres ===
- Abangan Ang Susunod Na Kabanata, comedy (1991–1997)
- Maalaala Mo Kaya, drama anthology (1991–2022)
- Kape at Balita, morning show (1991–1993)

=== Finales ===
- Chika Chika Chicks, comedy (1987–1991)
- Goin' Bananas, comedy (1987–1991)

== Sports ==
- November 24–December 3 – Manila is selected again as the host city for the 16th Southeast Asian Games, ten years since the 11th SEA Games held in the same city in 1981. The Philippine team participates in the 16th SEA Games and placed second with 91 gold, 62 silver and 84 bronze medals for a total of 237 medals ahead of Indonesia is in the first place.

== Births ==
- January 14 – Kristel Moreno, actress
- January 24 – Jan Franz Chan, representative for Ako Bicol (since 2026)
- February 5 – Juami Tiongson, basketball player
- February 12 – Simon Enciso, basketball player
- February 20:
  - Joshua Beloya, football player
  - Hidilyn Diaz, weightlifter and Olympic gold medalist
- February 21 – Jon Timmons, actor, model, and television personality
- March 18 – Jeric Teng, basketball player
- March 21 – Rhea Dimaculangan, volleyball player
- April 1 – Franco Hernandez, member of Hashtags (d. 2017)
- April 4 – Marlon Stöckinger, racing driver
- May 3 – Bela Padilla, actress
- May 9 – Kenneth Medrano, actor and model
- May 15 – Gerald Santos, actor and singer
- May 28 – Beauty Gonzalez, actress and model
- May 29 – Vin Abrenica, actor
- June 7 – Lara Maigue, classical singer and songwriter
- June 16 – Ryan Bang, Korean actor and comedian
- July 1 – Kim Molina, actress
- July 17 – Maverick Ahanmisi, basketball player
- July 19 – Arny Ross, actress
- August 4 – Neil Coleta, actor
- August 13:
  - Kayla Rivera, singer
  - Kazel Kinouchi, actress and model
- August 18 – Ed Daquioag, basketball player
- August 19:
  - Nathan Lopez, actor
  - Al James, singer and rapper
- August 21 – Carl Bryan Cruz, basketball player
- August 25 – Marisa Park, football player
- August 26 – Wil Dasovich, model and vlogger
- September 6 – Klarisse de Guzman, singer
- September 27 – Ynna Asistio, actress
- October 4 – Nico Elorde, basketball player
- October 22 – Melissa Gohing, volleyball player
- October 27 – Lincoln Velasquez, vlogger
- November 13
  - Kevin Alas, basketball player
  - James Forrester, basketball player
- November 22 – Gab Pangilinan, actress and singer
- December 11 – Mikhail Red, independent filmmaker
- December 12 – Michael DiGregorio, basketball player

=== Unknown ===
- Kiko Aquino Dee, political analyst and member of the prominent Aquino political family

== Deaths ==
- April 25 – Lamberto V. Avellana (b. 1915), film and stage director
- May 22 – Lino Brocka (b. 1939), film director
- July 11 – Atang de la Rama (b. 1902), film actress and singer
- August 28 – Paola Luz (b. 1964), singer
