= 1986 in the Philippines =

- Decades: 1960s; 1970s; 1980s; 1990s; 2000s
- See also: List of years in the Philippines; films

1986 in the Philippines details events of note that happened in the Philippines in the year 1986.

== Incumbents ==
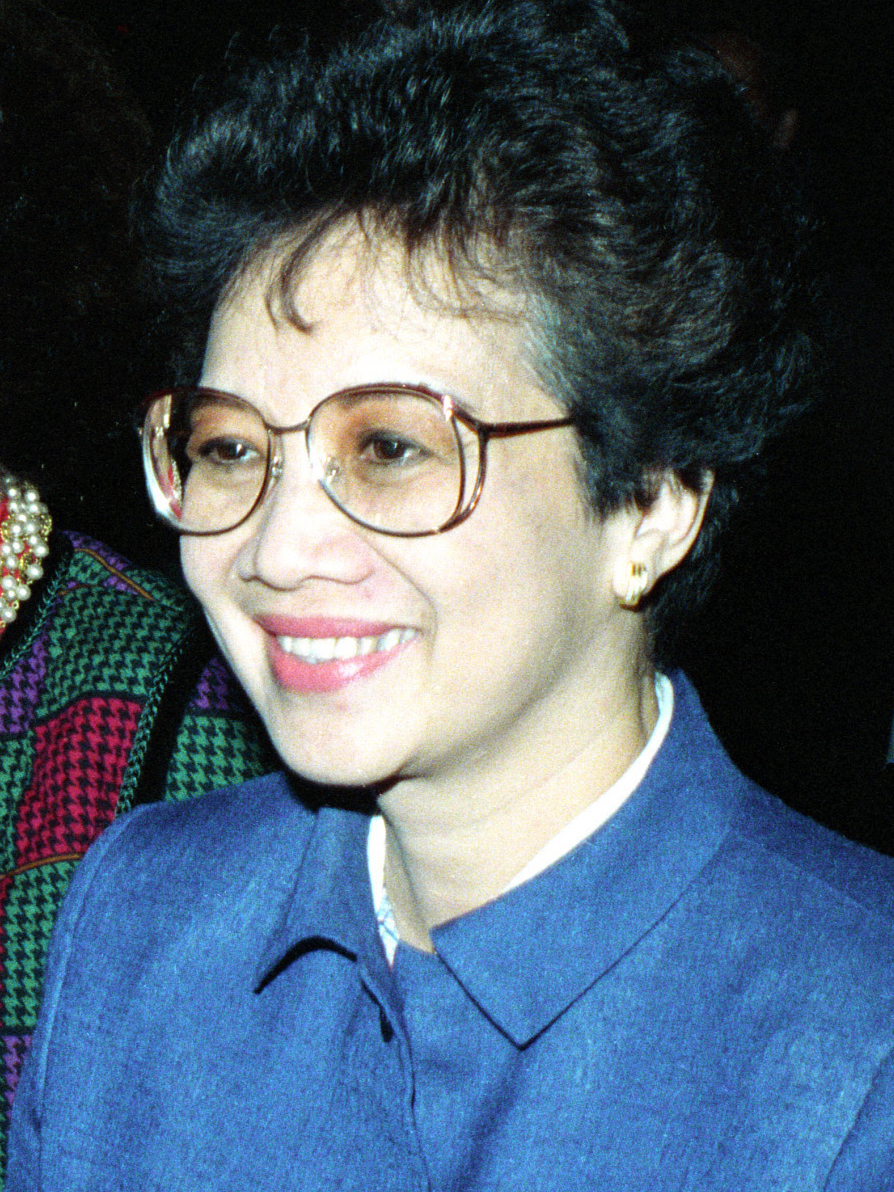
Corazon S.
Aquino

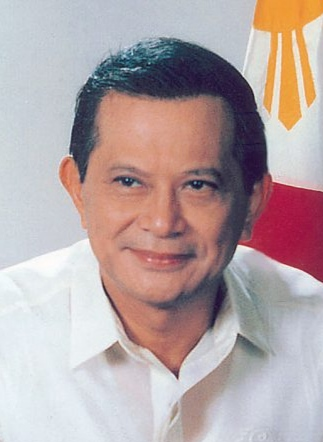
Salvador H.
Laurel

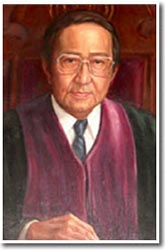
Claudio O.
Teehankee

=== Fourth Republic (1984–86) ===
- President: Ferdinand Marcos (KBL) (deposed February 25, 1986)
- Vice President: Arturo Tolentino (KBL)
- Chief Justice: Ramon Aquino
- Philippine Congress: Regular Batasang Pambansa
- House Speaker: Nicanor Yñiguez (KBL)

=== Revolutionary Government (March 25 – June 2, 1986) and Fifth Republic (1986 – present) ===
- President: Corazon Aquino (UNIDO)
- Vice President: Salvador Laurel (UNIDO)
- Chief Justice: Claudio Teehankee (1986–88)

== Events ==
=== February ===
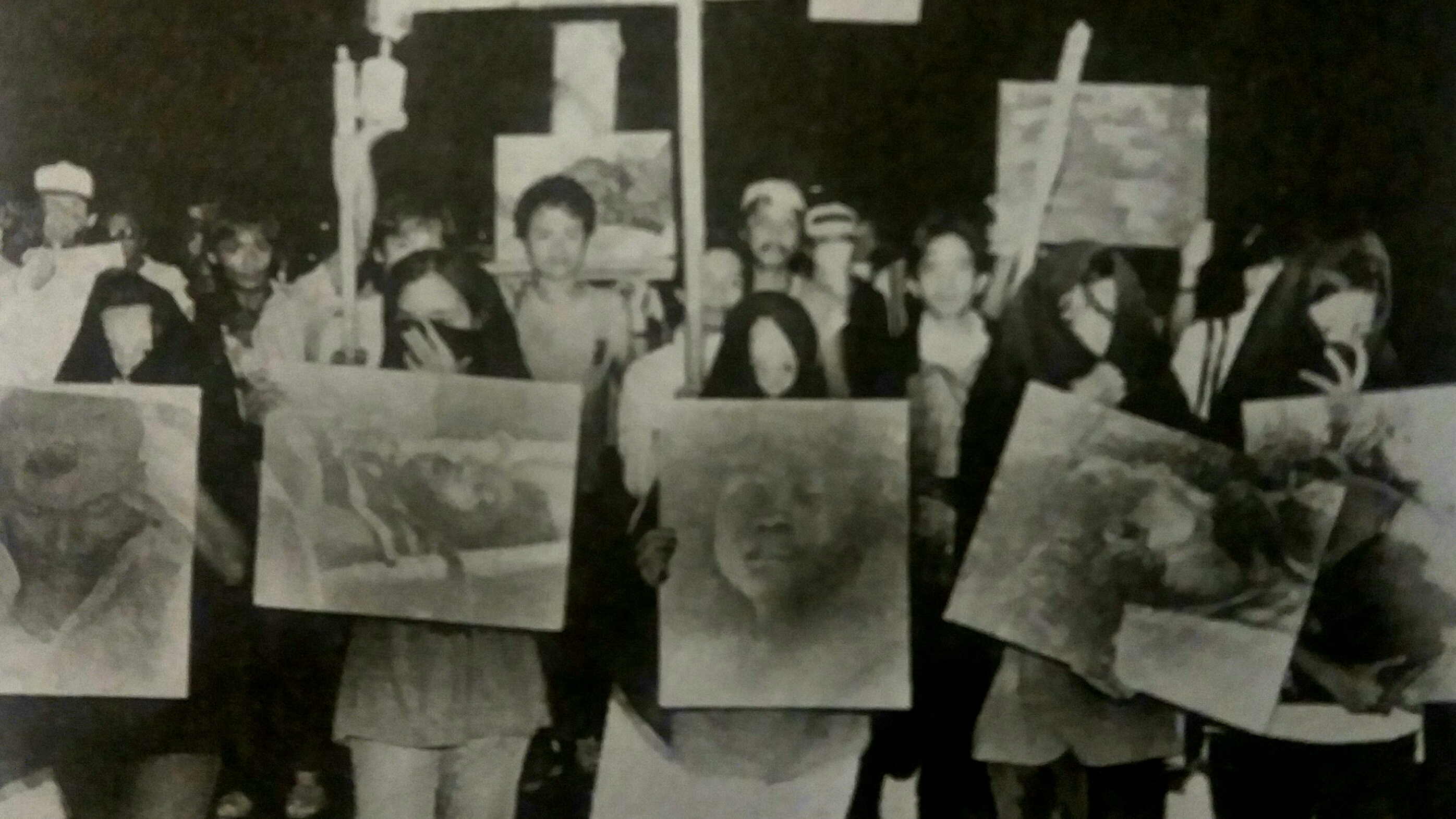
Rally against the Marcos Dictatorship in January 1986

- February 7 – Presidential snap elections are held. Pres. Marcos leads the tally made by the Commission of Elections (Comelec), but his opponent, Corazon Cojuangco–Aquino, leads another tally by the National Movement for Free Elections (Namfrel).
- February 9 – Thirty Comelec computer technicians walk out of their tabulation center at the PICC to protest attempts to manipulate the election results.
- February 11 – Opposition Antique former Gov. Evelio Javier is assassinated in front of the provincial capitol as the canvassing is being held there.
- February 15 – Pres. Marcos (and Tolentino) are declared by the Batasang Pambansa as winners in the poll canvass.
- February 16 – Cojuangco–Aquino leads Tagumpay ng Bayan (Victory of the People) rally in Luneta Grandstand with over 2 million attendees; proclaims victory in spite of the previous proclamation.
- February 22 – People Power Revolution (Day 1): Deputy Armed Forces of the Philippines (AFP) chief Lt. Gen. Fidel Ramos and Defense Minister Juan Ponce Enrile, backed by members of the armed forces loyal to the former, declares coup at a press conference at Camp Aguinaldo to call upon Pres. Marcos to resign and to announce their withdrawal of support; they seize key military camps; Cardinal Jaime Sin urges the public to support the troops.
- February 23 – People Power Revolution (Day 2): Opposition supporters, gathered around camps Crame and Aguinaldo along Epifanio delos Santos Avenue (EDSA), form human barricades; targeting loyalist marine forces are stopped by them.
- February 24 – People Power Revolution (Day 3): Reformist rebels storm government offices, radio and television stations, Camp Aguinaldo, Villamor Airbase, and Malacañang Palace; 15th Air Force Strike Wing, with Col. Antonio Sotelo, defects to the rebels; Col. Mariano Santiago leads the soldiers who take over government-owned Channel 4.
- February 25 – People Power Revolution (Day 4):
  - Cojuangco–Aquino swears in as the 11th and first female President of the Philippines before Chief Justice Claudio Teehankee at the ceremonies in Club Filipino in San Juan.
  - Marcos also swears in as President of the Philippines at Malacañang Palace; his own inauguration ceremonies are interrupted as other television stations are destroyed by rebels.
  - Ousted Marcos and his family are transported through airlift by four United States helicopters to Clark Air Base.
- February 26 – From Clark Air Base, Marcoses flee to Guam and to Hawaii.
- February 28:
  - Presidential Commission on Good Government is formed by president Aquino.
  - Investigation on Marcos' wealth.

=== March ===
- March 3 – In the first major attack by the New People's Army (NPA) post-revolution, about 200 rebels ambush a police truck on a bridge in Guinobatan, Albay, killing up to 17 police officers as well as four civilians aboard a minibus caught in a crossfire; 17 people are wounded.
- March 5 – President Aquino frees four suspected communist leaders, including Communist Party of the Philippines (CPP) founder Jose Maria Sison and alleged NPA founder Bernabe Buscayno, eventually releasing all political prisoners of the Marcos administration.
- March 15 – NPA guerillas ambush a government jeep on a mountain road in Amlan, Negros Oriental, killing twelve people, most of them employees of Philippine National Oil Company.
- March 17:
  - The United States Court of International Trade in New York denies a petition by the lawyers of former president Marcos against the plan by the United States government to publicize documents on Marcos wealth and to turn them over to the Philippine government upon latter's request. The documents, which have been taken out by Marcos' entourage, is later seized by the Customs upon their arrival in Hawaii.
  - Pilipino Star Ngayon is established as a first post-revolution tabloid newspaper.
- March 25 – Pres. Aquino abolishes the national assembly and the constitution; declares an interim constitution (Freedom Constitution, Proclamation No. 3) effective until a new one would be ratified in a national plebiscite.

=== April ===
- April 3 – More than 15,000 workers at the Subic Bay Naval Base return to work following a 12-day walkout.
- April 18 – Twenty-one soldiers are killed by NPA insurgents in a land mine explosion and an ambush in Albay.
- April 19 – A military convoy is attacked by NPA guerillas in Cagayan, killing 14 soldiers.
- April 24:
  - A military convoy is ambushed by NPA members in Cagayan. A Reuters chief photographer and a Manila Bulletin reporter, who are among the ten killed as the gun battle ensues, are said to be the first journalists killed while covering the communist insurgency.
  - Inter-island ship MV Doña Josefina sinks off the coast of Isabel, Leyte, with 34 passengers died and more than a hundred people reported missing.

=== May ===
- May 23:
  - The Supreme Court declares legitimate the provisional Aquino government.
  - A bus falls from a cliff in a village in Hamtic, Antique, killing 23 people and injuring 15 others.

=== June ===
- June 2 – Freedom Constitution is ended to give way for the adoption of a new constitution.
- June 24 - De La Salle University joining the UAAP as its eighth member.

=== July ===
- July 4 – Street clashes in an anti-nuclear rally outside the US Embassy injure 14 policemen and six demonstrators.
- July 6 – Former Vice Pres. Arturo Tolentino, with Marcos loyalists and more than 300 soldiers, takes over the Manila Hotel; proclaims himself as "acting president"; Tolentino leaves the hotel and begins surrender talks on the 7th; they are forced to surrender peacefully after the failure of the coup that lasted until the 8th. Col. Rolando Abadilla would be identified as the mastermind.
- July 9 – Pres. Aquino prohibits rallies by Marcos supporters.
- July 22 – DZMM and DWKO established as the first post-revolution radio stations.
- July 28 – The Philippine Star established as the first post-revolution newspaper. Its first issue is published.

=== August ===
- August 21:
  - A power failure hits Metro Manila and most of Luzon at evening, which is purportedly caused by a malfunction at the Ambuklao hydroelectric plant in Benguet. Power in most areas of the capital is restored overnight, but remains disrupted in the rest of Luzon by early morning of the following day.
  - A radio journalist in Albay reports that a number of children has fallen ill after being provided UNICEF's vitamin A capsules through a provincewide research program by the Ministry of Health and two United States-based groups, which has begun on July 30 to address vitamin A deficiency in the Bicol Region. The subsequent widespread panic in the region leads to the project being indefinitely postponed since August 30. By mid-September, reportedly there are 85 alleged cases of side effects and two deaths from vitamin A. The ministry, following their investigation, would later deny the accusations and affirm the safety of the capsules.

=== September ===
- September 1 – Muslim rebel leader Nur Misuari returns from exile in Libya for negotiations aimed at ending Muslim conflicts.
- September 2 – Typhoon Miding hits northern Luzon killing 36 people.
- September 5 – Pres. Aquino and Misuari, in Jolo, agree for negotiations aimed at ending a 14-year conflict.
- September 7 – City 2 Television (formerly BBC 2) is dissolved by Aquino.
- September 12 – The Supreme Court orders a retrial for former military chief Gen. Fabian Ver, 24 other military men, and a civilian, all acquitted in 1985 regarding their involvement in the 1983 murder of Benigno Aquino Jr. and Rolando Galman, as recommended on July 31 by a commission appointed by the Supreme Court.
- September 13 – The Mt. Data Peace Accord was signed between the Philippine Government and the separatist Cordillera Bodong Administration-Cordillera People's Liberation Army.
- September 14 – ABS-CBN went back on the air once again as it began rebroadcast to viewers and for station ID, the network carries the first tagline Watch Us Do It Again! followed by the second tagline Sharing A New Life with You. It features the first channel 2 logo is a wing-shaped blue crest with a white curved at the top and a white line as a tail, the Broadway 2 logo was used until 1987.
- September 21 – Thanksgiving Day cease to be celebrated after the EDSA Revolution and the fall of Marcos dictatorship. The tradition is no longer being celebrated.
- September 29 – NPA leader Rodolfo Salas is arrested in Manila. Rebellion charges are filed by the government against him and two others, Oct. 2.

=== October ===
- October 15 – Signing of the new constitution by Cecilia Muñoz-Palma and other members of the commission.
- October 20 – Milk Code of 1986 (Executive Order No. 51) is signed by Aquino in order to implement rules and regulations in the manufacture of infant formula products.

=== November ===
- November 4 – President Aquino, through Executive Order No. 55, orders the mothballing of the Bataan Nuclear Power Plant, which was constructed during the Marcos presidency, citing safety and economic reasons.
- November 11 and 22 – A coup plot by ex-government officials loyal to former Pres. Marcos and by a military faction loyal to Defense Minister Enrile, codenamed "God Save the Queen", is foiled by the government. After a failed coup attempt, Enrile is among the cabinet officials replaced by Pres. Aquino, Nov. 23.
- November 12–13 – Kilusang Mayo Uno leader Rolando Olalia and his driver, Leonor Alay-ay, are abducted by armed men in Pasig City, Nov. 12; are found dead in Antipolo, Rizal the following day. In connection with the murder, two soldiers are placed by the police under arrest as suspects, Dec. 1; a former AFP sergeant is arrested, Dec. 18. Of the 13 Reform the Armed Forces Movement members charged with the murders, Eduardo Kapunan, Jr. would be acquitted in 2016; three of them would be convicted in 2021.
- November 27 – Negotiators of the national government and communist rebels, in their first public appearance together, sign a ceasefire agreement, which becomes effective on December 10. It would take 60 days, ending on February 8, 1987, six days later than scheduled.

=== December ===
- December 30 – AFP orders to arrest armed guerrillas entering populous areas.

=== Undated ===
- Philippines Development Assistance Program is founded.

== Holidays ==
Letter of Instruction No. 1087, issued by President Marcos in 1980 that provided revised guidelines for observation of holidays, remained in effect (even after his presidency). The letter strictly mandated that when a legal holiday fell on a Sunday, only a proclamation was required to declare the following Monday a special public holiday. However, on September 10, Executive Secretary Joker Arroyo signed Memorandum Order No. 35, revoking the declaration of September 11 and 21 as Barangay and National Thanksgiving days, respectively, as national special holidays.

Meanwhile, the Filipino-American Friendship Day (July 4) was observed for the last time; as it would be omitted in the new list of holidays mandated by Executive Order No. 203, issued in 1987.

Legal public holidays

- January 1 – New Year's Day
- March 27 – Maundy Thursday
- March 28 – Good Friday
- May 1 – Labor Day
- May 6 – Araw ng Kagitingan (Bataan, Corregidor and Besang Pass Day)
- June 12 – Independence Day
- July 4 – Filipino-American Friendship Day
- August 31 – National Heroes Day
- November 30 – Bonifacio Day
- December 25 – Christmas Day
- December 30 – Rizal Day

Nationwide special holidays

- November 1 – All Saints Day
- December 31 – Last Day of the Year

== Entertainment and culture ==
- December 27 – Corazon Aquino is named as Time magazine's woman of the year.

== Births ==
=== January ===
- January 4 – Katrina Halili, model and actress
- January 13 – Jan Manual, comedian
- January 14 – Terry Ridon, lawyer, broadcaster and politician
- January 25 – Luane Dy, Filipino showbiz television personality, host and actress
- January 26:
  - Sean Anthony, basketball player
  - Kian Kazemi, actor and part-time model
  - Ervic Vijandre, actor

=== February ===
- February 12 – Georgina Wilson, model, actress, and host
- February 14 – Roxanne Guinoo, actress
- February 18 – Brenan Espartinez, singer

=== March ===
- March 10:
  - Aaron Atayde, radio DJ, TV host and sports anchor
  - J.C. de Vera, actor, host, and endorser
- March 20 – Jam Sebastian, YouTube content creator (d. 2015)
- March 28 – Dion Ignacio, actor

=== April ===
- April 11 – RJ Jazul, Basketball player

=== May ===
- May 16 – Shamcey Supsup, Miss Universe 2011 3rd Runner-up
- May 17 – Ruben Doctora, football player
- May 20 - Ron Henley (rapper), rapper, singer and songwriter
- May 23 – Karla Henry, Miss Earth 2008
- May 25 – Marcy Arellano, basketball player
- May 26 – Alex Vincent Medina, actor

=== June ===
- June 8 – Japoy Lizardo, actor, taekwondo practitioner, and endorser
- June 12 – Carla Abellana, actress and host
- June 15 – Mark Canlas, basketball player
- June 29 – Iya Villania, actress and host
- June 30 – Jayson Castro, basketball player

=== August ===
- August 8 – Hezy Val B. Acuña II, basketball player
- August 10 – Mercedes Cabral, actress
- August 16 – Reil Cervantes, basketball player
- August 21 – Stephan Schröck, football player
- August 25 – Gilbert Bulawan, basketball player (d. 2016)
- August 29 – Joem Bascon, actor
- August 31 – Rachelle Ann Go, singer

=== September ===
- September 1 – JVee Casio, basketball player
- September 4 – James Younghusband, football player
- September 9 – Jervy Cruz, basketball player
- September 13 – Sugar Mercado, dancer and actress
- September 27 – Chai Fonacier, actress and singer

=== October ===
- October 2 – Pancho Magno, actor
- October 5 – Shiima Xion, wrestler
- October 22 – Matt Evans, actor

=== November ===
- November 3 – Jasmine Trias, singer, songwriter
- November 4 – Angelica Panganiban, actress
- November 7 – Boobay comedian and TV host
- November 22 – Erika Padilla, actress, model, and courtside reporter
- November 23 – Maxene Magalona, actress
- November 27 – Steven Silva, actor and footballer
- November 30 – Beau Belga, basketball player
- November 5 – Dianne Medina, actress, model, dancer, television host, news anchor
- November 24 – Val Acuña, basketball player

=== December ===
- December 14 – Mark Herras, actor
- December 21 – Karel Marquez, actress, singer, and TV host
- December 22 – Arianne Caoili, chess player (d. 2020)
- December 23 – James Walsh, swimmer
- December 31 – Mike Tan, actor

== Deaths ==
- February 11 – Evelio Javier, politician and Governor of Antique (b. 1942)
- February 25 – Nemesio Yabut, politician and Mayor of Makati (b. 1925)
- April 17 – Emma Henry, first female national police commander
- April 24 – Pete Mabasa, Manila Bulletin correspondent
- April 25 – Willie Vicoy, Reuters photographer (aged 45)
- May 7 – Juan Nakpil, Architect (b. 1899)
- July 21 – José Avelino, Senate President of the Philippines (b. 1890)
- August 23 – Eduardo Quisumbing, National Scientist and Plant botanist (b. 1895)
- November 8 – Eddie del Mar, actor (b. 1919)
- November 10 – Rogelio de la Rosa, actor and Senator (b. 1914)
- November 13 – Rolando Olalia, labor leader; chair of Kilusang Mayo Uno
- November 19 – David Puzon, district representative (until 1972) and assemblyman (1984–1986) from Cagayan (aged 65)
- November 22 – Ulbert Ulama Tugung, known Muslim leader and former parliamentarian.

== See also ==
- 1986-1987 Philippine coup attempts
- Philippines
