= 1988 in the Philippines =

- Decades: 1960s; 1970s; 1980s; 1990s; 2000s
- See also: List of years in the Philippines; films

1988 in the Philippines details events of note that happened in the Philippines in the year 1988.

== Incumbents ==
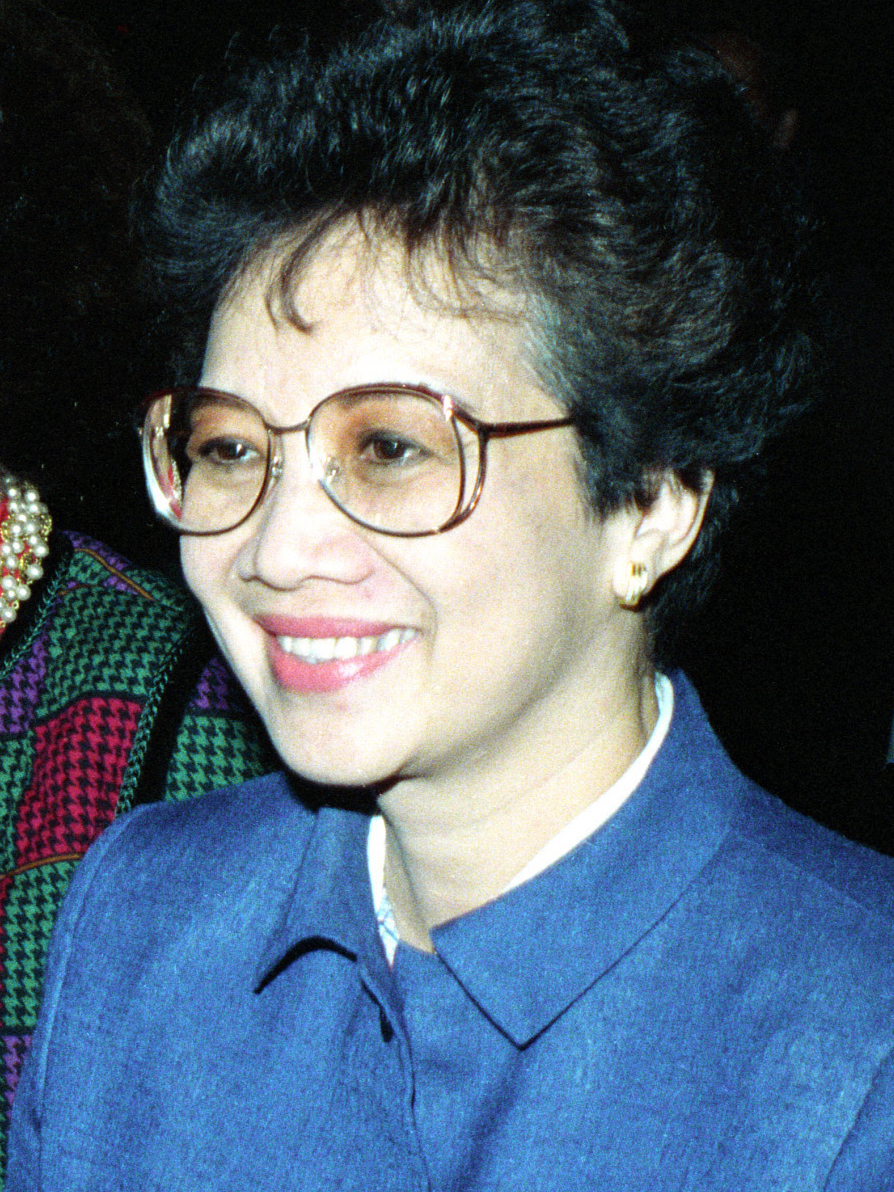
Corazon S.
Aquino

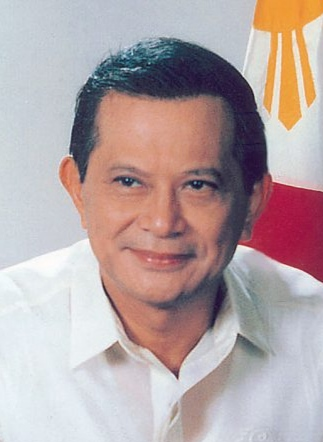
Salvador H.
Laurel

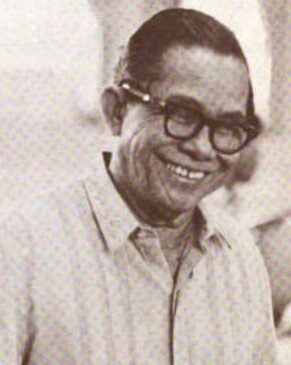
Jovito R.
Salonga

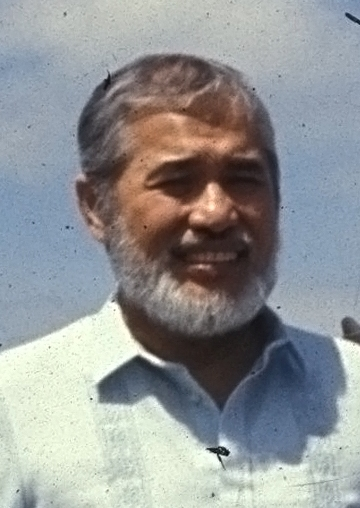
Ramon V.
Mitra Jr.

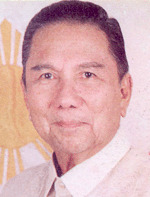
Marcelo B.
Fernan

- President: Corazon Aquino (PDP-Laban)
- Vice President: Salvador Laurel (Nacionalista)
- Chief Justice:
  - Claudio Teehankee (until April 18)
  - Pedro Yap (April 18 – July 1)
  - Marcelo Fernan (starting July 1)
- Philippine Congress: 8th Congress of the Philippines
- Senate President: Jovito Salonga (Liberal)
- House Speaker: Ramon V. Mitra, Jr. (LDP, 2nd District Palawan)

== Events ==
=== January ===
- January 18 – First local elections under the Aquino administration are held. Administration candidates win a majority of the local seats.
- January 28 – Toymaker company Mattel Incorporated announces the closure of its Philippine subsidiary, with 3,000 job losses.

=== February ===
- February 4 – Cardinal Sin announces the closure of the National Secretariat for Social Action for the claims of infiltration by communists.
- February 27 – Thirteen members of the elite anti-insurgency Scout Rangers are killed in an ambush near Camalig, Albay.

=== March ===
- March 9 – Amnesty International publishes a report on the cases of human rights violations by the Aquino administration committed by military and paramilitary groups; report is rejected by the government.
- March 28 – A New People's Army (NPA) attack kill 7 of the bodyguards of Malabon mayor Prospero Oreta, who was wounded thereafter.
- March 29 – Eight suspected communists are captured in military raids on their safehouses in Metro Manila—seven in San Juan, including three leading Communist Party of the Philippines (CPP) officials, NPA commander Romulo Kintanar, general secretary Rafael Baylosis, and senior central committee member Benjamin de Vera; and Napoleon Manuel, "logistics officer" for the NPA, in Quezon City.

=== April ===
- April 2 – Col. Gregorio Honasan, leader of the August 1987 coup attempt, together with 13 of his guards, escapes from a prison ship in Manila Bay. Eight navy guards who helped him to escape are captured in Manila, Apr. 15.
- April 8 – Honasan's accomplice, Lt. Col. Edgardo Martillano, escape with his escort while on temporary release from jail.

=== May ===
- May 4 – Josefa Edralin Marcos, mother of former Pres. Ferdinand Marcos, dies in Manila, aged 95. Her son's request to return to the Philippines for her funeral would be later denied twice.
- May 11 – A military court convicts 106 soldiers and acquits one, all took part in the January 1987 coup attempt.

=== June ===
- June 4 – Mine tunnels collapse on Mount Lablab, Sibutad, Zamboanga del Norte, killing at least 27 people.
- June 10 – The Comprehensive Agrarian Reform Program (CARP, Republic Act No. 6657) is signed by Pres. Cojuangco–Aquino into law, providing land reform for farmers; to be effective within 20 years.
- June 30 – Polytechnic University of the Philippines head Nemesio Prudente, survived in a gun attack in November 1987, is seriously wounded in a street ambush in Manila wherein three of his aides are killed.

=== July ===
- July 25 – Pres. Aquino, in a state of the nation address, announces the formation of Citizen Armed Force Geographical Unit, and orders the dissolution of vigilante groups.

=== September ===
- September 16 – Political organization Laban ng Demokratikong Pilipino (LDP) formed
- September 13 – Generics Act of 1988 (Republic Act No. 6675) was signed by President Aquino in order to require and ensure the production of an adequate supply, distribution, use and acceptance of drugs and medicines identified by their generic name.

=== October ===
- October 18 – The Interior Bases Agreement between the Philippines and U.S was signed.
- October 22 – Former Pres. Ferdinand Marcos and his wife are charged in the United States regarding illegal money transfer.
- October 23–24 – Typhoon Unsang struck into Luzon resulted in a widespread flooding and landslides. The storm and flood brought scores of fatalities.
- October 24 – Interisland ferry MV Doña Marilyn sinks off Leyte during a typhoon, killing 389.

=== November ===
- November 7 – The Tower of Power transmitter was inaugurated by President Aquino and GMA Network board of directors following the transmitter's opening and a musical special.

=== December ===
- December 13 – A military court acquits former Col. Rolando Abadilla, Manila's security chief under the administration of Pres. Marcos and then Ilocos Norte vice-governor, of charges of plotting coup attempts against President Aquino.

=== Date unknown ===
- May – Abante established as a second post-revolution tabloid newspaper.

== Holidays ==
As per Executive Order No. 292, chapter 7 section 26, the following are regular holidays and special days, approved on July 25, 1987. Note that in the list, holidays in bold are "regular holidays," and those in italics are "nationwide special days".

- January 1 – **New Year's Day**
- March 31 – **Maundy Thursday**
- April 1 – **Good Friday**
- April 9 – **Araw ng Kagitingan (Bataan and Corregidor Day)**
- May 1 – **Labor Day**
- June 12 – **Independence Day**
- August 28 – **National Heroes Day**
- November 1 – All Saints Day
- November 30 – **Bonifacio Day**
- December 25 – **Christmas Day**
- December 30 – **Rizal Day**
- December 31 – Last Day of the Year

In the case of Araw ng Kagitingan, it was observed again for the first time (as Bataan and Corregidor Day) on April 9, the date initially proclaimed as Bataan Day. In 1980, President Ferdinand Marcos issued Letter of Instruction No. 1087, moving the holiday to May 6 as Araw ng Kagitingan which also included Bessang Pass in the observance. This took effect from 1981 until 1987; after which the date was reverted.

In addition, several other places observe local holidays, such as the foundation of their town. These are also "special days."

== Sports ==
- September 17–October 2 – The Philippines participates in the 1988 Summer Olympics held in Seoul, South Korea and ranked 61st. Only boxer Leopoldo Serantes received his bronze medal and placed third in boxing.
- October 7 – The Ateneo Blue Eagles wins the UAAP Season 51 men's basketball tournament against the De La Salle Green Archers at Rizal Memorial Coliseum in Manila.

== Births ==
- January 6 – Mikael Daez, actor and model
- January 8 – Gretchen Espina, singer
- January 16 – Alex Gonzaga, TV host, actress
- January 21 – Glaiza de Castro, singer and actress
- February 4 – Calvin Abueva, basketball player
- February 14 – Javier Patiño, football player
- February 27 – Iain Ramsay, football player
- February 29 – Milan Melindo, boxer
- March 2:
  - Roland Müller, football player
  - Nadine Samonte, actress
- March 3 – Patricia Tumulak, beauty queen and host
- March 6 – Isabelle Daza, actress and model
- March 8 – Bryan Termulo, singer
- March 9 – Alodia Gosiengfiao, actress, singer, TV presenter, model, and cosplayer
- March 15 – Jolo Revilla, actor and politician
- April 2 – Ellen Adarna, actress and model
- April 6 – Melai Cantiveros, actress, comedian, and TV host
- April 14 – Francis Mossman, actor and model
- April 21 – JR Buensuceso, basketball player
- April 22 – Chad Kinis, comedian
- April 24 – Jinri Park, actress, model, and radio DJ
- April 25 – Dasuri Choi, dancer and entertainer
- April 26 – Hazel Ann Mendoza, actress
- April 27 – Mark Bringas, basketball player
- May 9 – RK Bagatsing, actor and model
- May 12 – Marky Cielo, actor and dancer (d. 2008)
- May 13 – Paulo Avelino, actor and model
- May 19 – Greg Slaughter, men's basketball player
- May 20 – Carla Humphries, actress and model
- May 23 – Vaness del Moral, actress
- May 27 – Yam Concepcion, film and television actress
- June 2 – Phanie Teves, politician
- June 9 – Martin Steuble, football player
- June 11 – Gabriel Valenciano, actor and dancer
- June 15 – Kevin Santos, actor
- July 7 – Venus Raj, Miss Universe 2010, 4th runner-up
- July 17 – Jason Pagara, boxer
- July 19 – Simon Atkins, basketball player
- July 22 – Renz Ongkiko, news anchor, model, and journalist
- July 25 – Sarah Geronimo, singer, actress, and TV host
- August 11 – Rabeh Al-Hussaini, basketball player
- August 17 – Lizlee Ann Gata-Pantone, volleyball player
- August 24 – Helga Krapf, actress
- August 26 – Niña Jose, actress
- August 29 – Iwa Moto, actress
- September 6 – Jed Montero, actress
- September 7 – Robby Celiz, basketball player
- September 9 – JM de Guzman, actor, singer and model
- September 10 – Maico Buncio, motorcycle driver (d. 2011)
- September 18 – Lester Alvarez, basketball player
- September 30 – Simon Greatwich, football player
- October 4 – Joseph Marco, actor
- October 5 – Maja Salvador, actress
- November 4 – Michelle Madrigal, actress
- November 5 – Enchong Dee, actor and former De La Salle Green Archers swimmer
- November 6 – Eric Cray, track and field athlete
- November 10 – Pauleen Luna, TV host and actress
- November 15 – Jace Flores, actor and model
- November 17 – Chris Exciminiano, basketball player
- November 19 – J. C. Santos, actor
- November 20:
  - Ariella Arida, Miss Universe 2013, 3rd runner-up
  - Edgar Allan Guzman, actor and model
- November 28 – Daniel Matsunaga, actor and model
- December 2 – Athena, singer and stage actress
- December 4 – Yeng Constantino, singer
- December 5 – Chris Ellis, basketball player
- December 9 – Matthew Manotoc, athlete and politician
- December 14 – Eda Nolan, actress
- December 25 – Heather Cooke, football player
- December 28 – AJ Banal, boxer

== Deaths ==
- January 17 – Roy Padilla, Sr., Governor of Camarines Norte (b. 1926)
- April 9 – Arturo Belleza Rotor, medical doctor, civil servant, musicianm and writer (b. 1907)
- May 4 – Josefa Edralin Marcos, mother of former President Ferdinand Marcos (aged 95)
- June 11 – Ernani Cuenco, composer, film scorer, musical director and music teacher (b. 1936)
- July 27 – Antonio Tantay, Olympic basketball player (b. 1920)
- August 21 – Teodoro de Villa Diaz, guitarist and composer (b. 1963)
- August 27 – Mario Montenegro, actor (b. 1928)
- September 12 – Mars Ravelo, graphic novelist (b. 1916)
- September 13 – Julian Banzon, biochemist and a National Scientist of the Philippines (b. 1908)
- September 27 – Teofilo Camomot, Roman Catholic archbishop of Cagayan de Oro (b. 1914)
- September 30 – Chino Roces, founder and owner of Associated Broadcasting Corporation and the Manila Times (b. 1913)
- October 31 – Gregorio F. Zaide, historian, author and politician (b. 1907)
