= 1987 in the Philippines =

- Decades: 1960s; 1970s; 1980s; 1990s; 2000s
- See also: List of years in the Philippines; films

1987 in the Philippines details events of note that happened in the Philippines in the year 1987.

== Incumbents ==
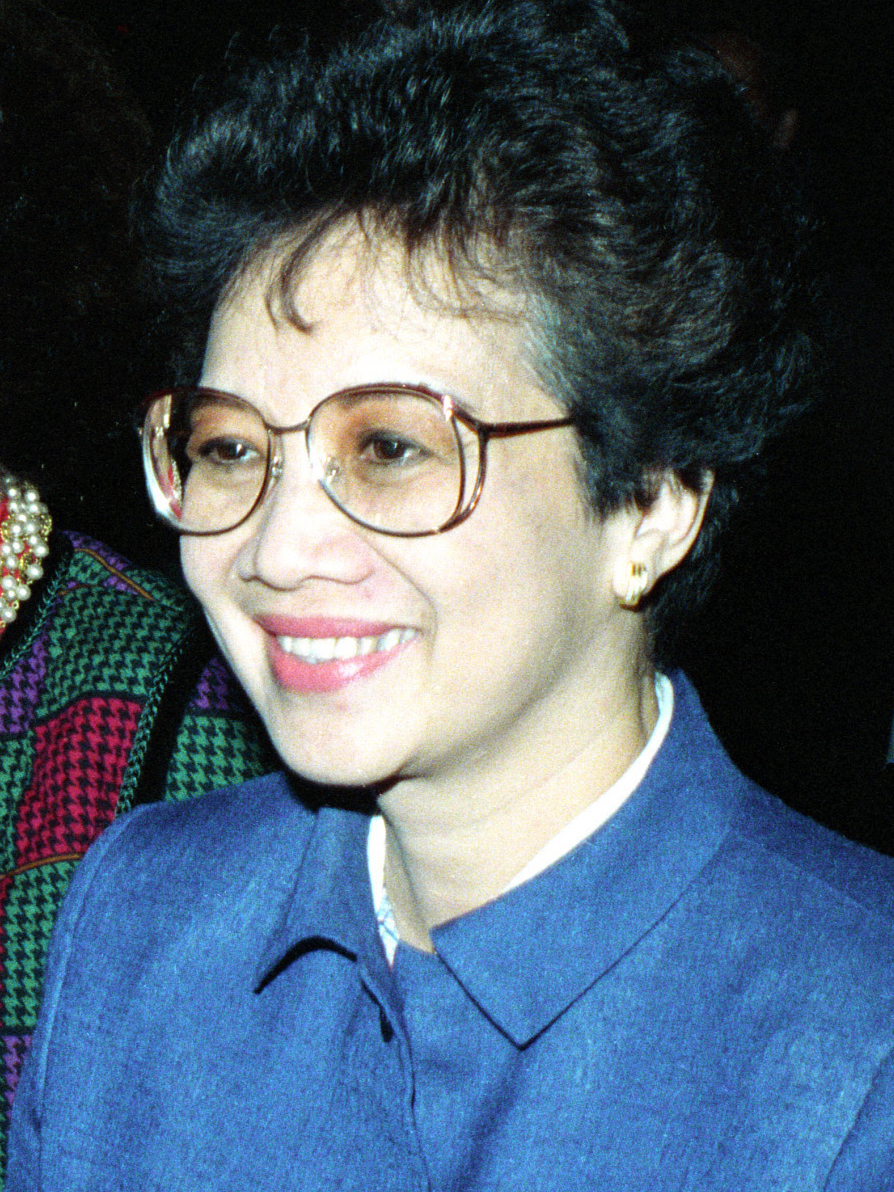
Corazon S.
Aquino

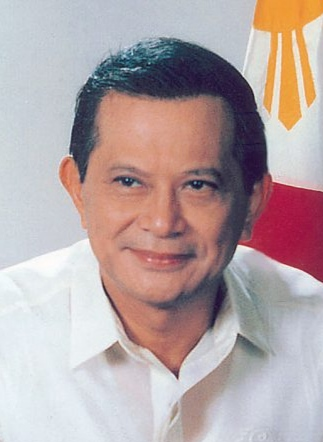
Salvador H.
Laurel

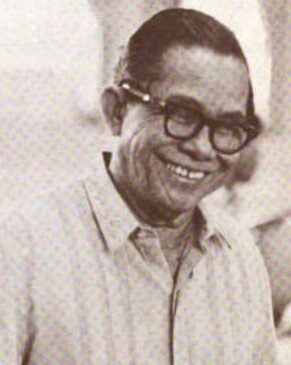
Jovito R.
Salonga

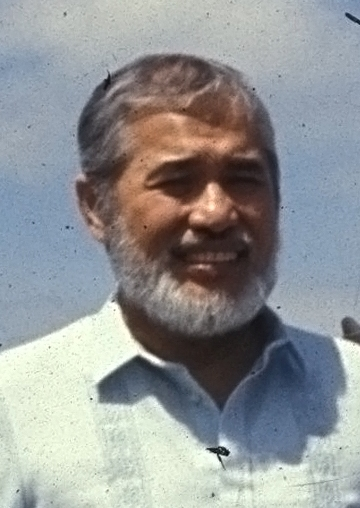
Ramon V.
Mitra Jr.

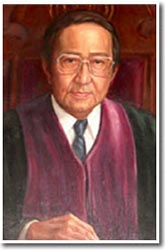
Claudio O.
Teehankee

- President: Corazon Aquino (UNIDO)
- Vice President: Salvador Laurel (UNIDO)
- Chief Justice: Claudio Teehankee (1986–88)
- Philippine Congress: 8th Congress of the Philippines
- Senate President: Jovito Salonga (Liberal)
- House Speaker: Ramon V. Mitra, Jr. (LDP, 2nd District Palawan)

== Events ==
=== January ===
- January 4 – A government proposal for autonomy in 4 Muslim-dominated provinces in Mindanao is agreed by Muslim separatists, ending the 14-year secessionist war in the area.
- January 22 – A crowd of 10,000, mostly farmers demanding land reforms (and rallying against Pres. Aquino), are shot by the troops at Mendiola Bridge during their protest march as they are going to the presidential palace in Manila; 13 farmers killed; 98 others injured.
- January 27 – Pro-Marcos rebel soldiers, led by Col. Oscar Canlas, occupy GMA Network compound, wherein a siege by some 300 mutineers for almost 3 days ends in their surrender to the government, with 35 wounded; Villamor Air Base, wherein an assault results in the death of a mutineer and 16 injuries; as well as Sangley Point Naval base and the government-owned PTV-4. In connection with the coup attempt, at least 509 people would be arrested; 107 soldiers would be convicted by a military court in 1988.

=== February ===
- February 2 – In a national plebiscite for a proposed new constitution, majority votes in favor of it. Drafted by the Constitutional Commission of 1986, it would be adopted with a vote of 76.37% in the referendum for its ratification.
- February 8 – A ceasefire between government troops and the guerrilla forces, began in December 1987, expires.
- February 10 – A clash between 40 communist New People's Army (NPA) rebels and the military forces in Lupao, Nueva Ecija kills 17 villagers and a soldier; wounds an Army radioman. AFP chief Ramos apprehended 85 troops to barracks on Feb. 18 during an investigation.
- February 11:
  - Manila Standard publishes its first issue.
  - A new constitution is declared ratified, replacing the "freedom constitution".

=== March ===
- March 5 – A fire destroys a warehouse and nine homes in an industrial-residential area in Marikina, killing 18 people in an old shoe factory which has been converted into a worker's dormitory.
- March 17 – Nineteen army soldiers are killed in a land mine attack, perpetrated by Communist rebels, in Quezon.
- March 18 – A bomb explosion in a grandstand at the Philippine Military Academy in Baguio kills four people and injures up to 43 others.
- March 19 – Communist rebels ambush a military patrol near Bonifacio, Misamis Occidental, killing 18 soldiers in a battle.

=== April ===
- April 18 – A raid in Fort Bonifacio is staged by 56 mutineers trying to free soldiers detained for the failed Jan. 27 coup attempt; 62 people, including military officers, are kept hostage; but is repelled with a rebel soldier killed and two wounded.
- April 19 – A major power failure, similar to that of August 1986, hits Metro Manila and most of Luzon for several hours at evening, purportedly caused by a transmission line failure.

=== May ===
- May 4 – An ambush by rebels in Malinao, Aklan leaves 16 government soldiers dead and nine wounded.
- May 11 – Legislative elections is held for the first time post-Marcos era. Administration candidates would win more than two-thirds of the House seats and 22 in the Senate, where the oppositionist Grand Alliance for Democracy would secure the remaining two seats.
- May 27 - Geraldine Asis was proclaimed Top 10 in the Miss Universe 1987 pageant night was held in the HarbourFront Centre, Singapore

=== June ===
- June 8 – Bernabe Buscayno, former NPA ranking leader and one of the founders of Partido ng Bayan, is seriously wounded in a car ambush in Quezon City wherein a television cameraman is killed.
- June 22 – A convoy carrying former rebel priest Conrado Balweg is ambushed by suspected guerrillas in Licuan-Baay, Abra, killing eight.
- June 26 – Philippine Airlines PR 206 crashes into Mt. Ugo in Itogon, Benguet with all 50 people on board killed. It is then the country's second worst air accident.

=== July ===
- Early July – A tape-recorded conversation between former President Ferdinand Marcos and two Americans in the former's home in Hawaii on May 27 is publicized in Washington, D.C. and in Manila, revealing his plan to launch a coup by this month and to buy weapons to be used in an attack at the presidential palace.
- July 13 – Security forces revealed that another anti-government plot, which involved the takeover of an airport, a school, and the Air Force headquarters, all in Metro Manila, is aborted with the arrest of four army officers in Manila, including a major on July 10. Dozen bomb attacks in the past three weeks has been linked to the plot.
- July 15 – The Cordillera Administrative Region (CAR) is created through Executive Order No. 220 signed by Pres. Corazon Cojuangco–Aquino, consisting of, from Region 1, the provinces of Abra, Benguet and Mountain Province, and Baguio, and from Region 2, the provinces of Kalinga-Apayao and Ifugao.
- July 27:
  - Fifty soldiers arrest Col. Rolando Abadilla, President Marcos' intelligence chief and a renegade army officer believed to be the mastermind of at least four previous coup plots, at his home near Manila. On July 31, Abadilla is charged with conspiracy to commit rebellion in connection with the recently aborted attempt.
  - The re-established Congress is opened with its first session.
  - NPA guerrillas in Luna, Kalinga-Apayao, attack an army convoy, which has been sent to reinforce an army detachment also under attack, killing 18 soldiers.

=== August ===
- August 2 – Secretary of the Interior and Local Government Jaime Ferrer and his driver are killed by gunmen before reaching home in Parañaque, in the first assassination of a cabinet member in country's history. Police charges two men regarding the murder on August 25.
- August 28–29 – A coup attempt against Pres. Aquino, one of the most serious, is launched by members of the Reform the Armed Forces Movement (RAM) led by Col. Gregorio Honasan; rebel soldiers seize Malacañang Palace, Camp Aguinaldo, Villamor Air Base, three television stations in Metro Manila, military camps in Pampanga and Cebu, and the airport in Legazpi City, wherein assaults result in at least 53 fatalities and more than 200 injuries; is repelled by government troops on the 29th.

=== September ===
- September 2 – Twenty-one government troops are killed in an ambush at a village in Quezon. On the same day, ten are killed in a raid in the municipal hall of Gonzaga, Cagayan. Both attacks are perpetrated by the NPA rebels.
- September 5 – Almost one platoon of constabulary forces, later colloquially described as the Lason Batch, fell victims to a mass poisoning attack in Zamboanga in which 19 soldiers died and 140 were hospitalized.
- September 9 and 11 – The entire 25-member Cabinet and three officials of the Presidential Commission on Good Government resign during an emergency meeting following the previous month's failed coup attempt. Two days later, nine officials also tender resignations, including Central Bank governor Jose Fernandez and commissioners of the internal revenue, customs and immigration bureaus. Only few are later replaced by President Aquino, including Vice President Laurel who resigns as foreign secretary.
- September 12 – Fighting near Samal, Bataan, results in deaths of six soldiers and seven guerrillas.

=== October ===
- October 12 – Pres. Aquino files a libel suit against The Philippine Star columnist Luis Beltran for his remarks about her and a mutiny in August. The conviction of Beltran, as well as publisher Maximo Soliven, would be later reversed.
- October 18 – Canonization of San Lorenzo Ruiz, the first Filipino saint.
- October 27 – An explosion and fire in a broadcasting complex in Quezon City, which houses media networks, government-owned People's Television Network and privately owned ABS-CBN, cause their stations having their broadcasts interrupted.
- October 28 – Three American servicemen and a Filipino civilian are murdered near Clark Air Base.

=== November ===
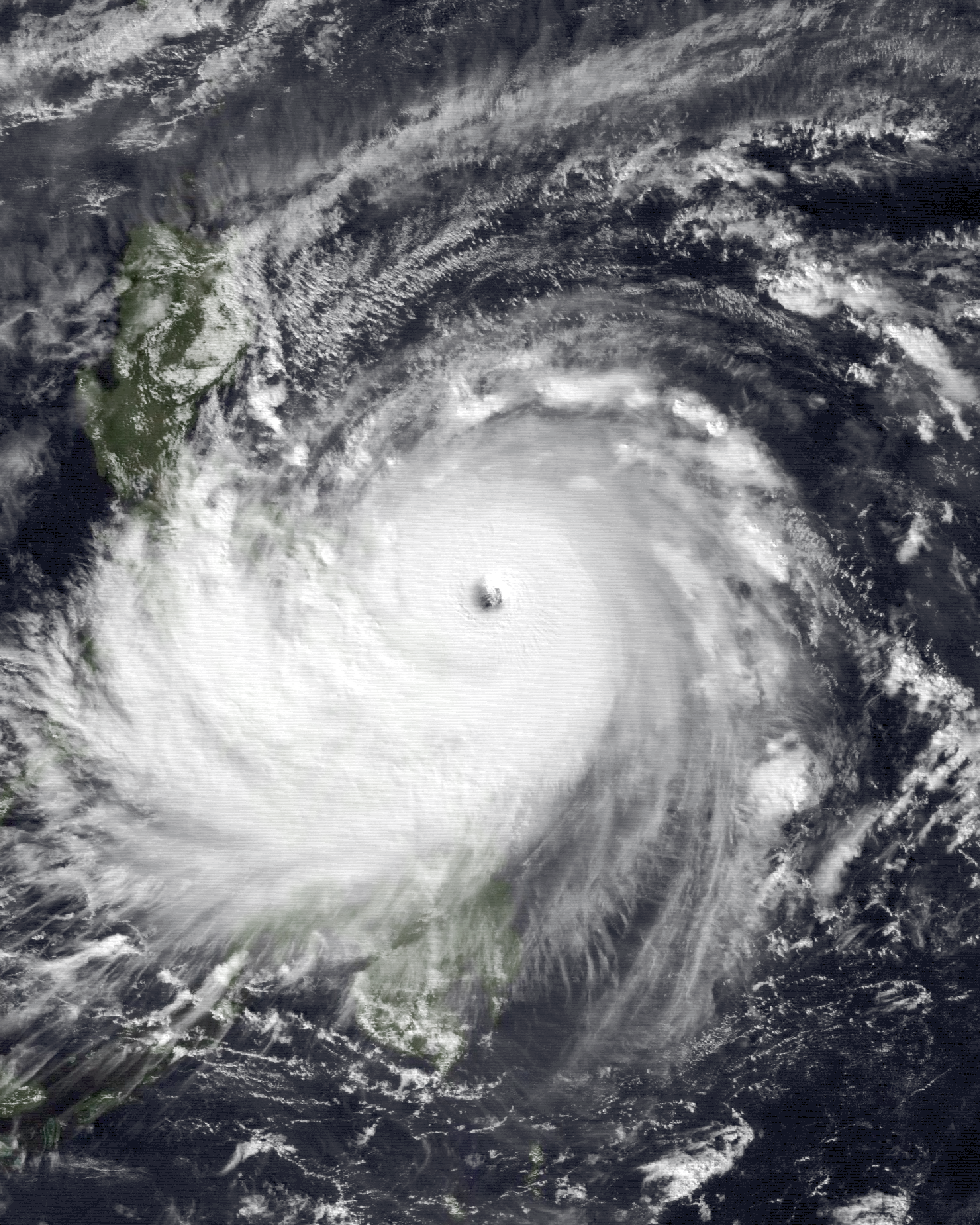
Nina at peak intensity while approaching the Philippines

- November 11 – Polytechnic University of the Philippines president Nemesio Prudente is wounded in a gun attack wherein the university attorney, Alex Marteja, is killed. Prudente would be wounded in another attack in June 1988.
- November 15 – Juanito Rivera, CPP's second highest ranking official, is arrested in Capas, Tarlac.
- November 25 – Super Typhoon Nina (Sisang) slammed into Luzon, killing 1,063 people and what is believed as the worst typhoon to hit an area in the 20th century.

=== December ===
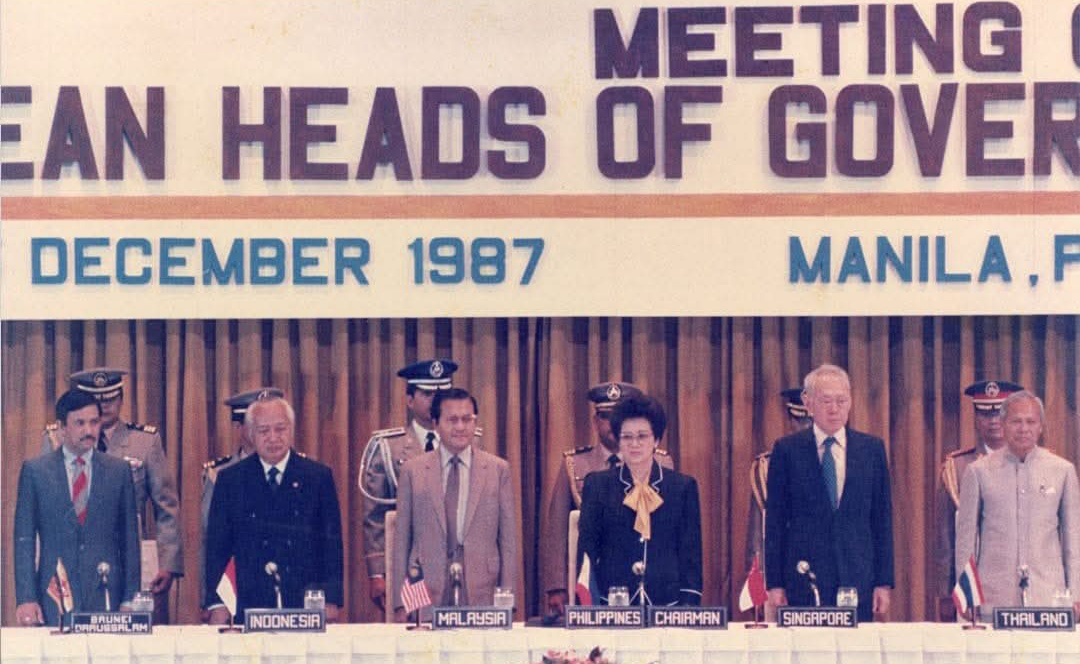
President Corazon Aquino chairs the 3rd ASEAN Summit on December 14, 1987

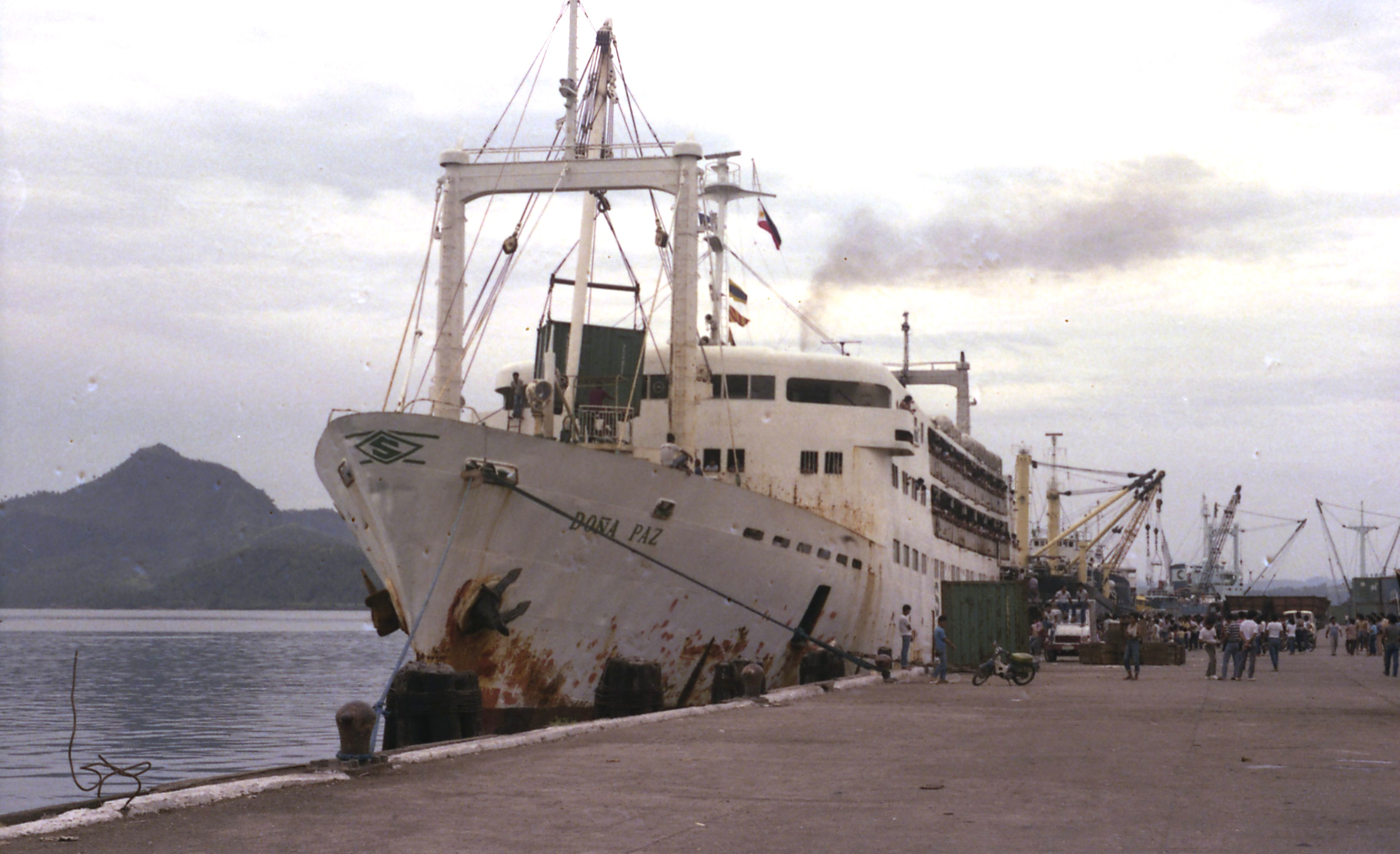
MV Doña Paz

- December 9 – Col. Gregorio Honasan, leader of the August coup attempt, is captured along with four other officers and two civilians in a raid on a townhouse in Manila. He is later charged with rebellion, and on December 19, is dropped by President Aquino from the military rolls along with 13 other officers.
- December 14–15 – The third ASEAN Summit is held in Manila.
- December 20 – Interisland passenger ferry MV Doña Paz, travelling from Leyte to Manila and said to be overloaded, and oil tanker MT Vector collide at Tablas Strait off Mindoro Island, setting both on fire; 26 survived, death toll later estimated to be 4,386; considered the deadliest peacetime maritime disaster in history.
- December 30 – A regional court orders the release of former colonel Abadilla, who have been involved in coup attempts against Pres. Aquino, allowing him to run in local elections the following month.

=== Unknown date ===
- The Tanghalang Pilipino is established as the resident drama company of the Cultural Center of the Philippines.

== Holidays ==
Even after the presidency of Ferdinand Marcos, his Letter of Instruction No. 1087, issued in 1980 that provided revised guidelines for observation of holidays, was still in effect.

In the case of Araw ng Kagitingan, it was observed for the last time on May 6 (as Bataan, Corregidor and Besang Pass Day); as it would be reverted to April 9 (as Bataan and Corregidor Day), as stated by Executive Order No. 203, and chapter 7, section 26 of Executive Order No. 292, both approved by President Aquino on June 30 and July 25, respectively. The latter listed nationwide holidays that still being observed to this day.

Meanwhile, the Filipino-American Friendship Day (July 4), observed until 1986, was excluded in the list.

Before the issuance of EO Nos. 203 and 292

Legal public holidays

- January 1 – New Year's Day
- April 16 – Maundy Thursday
- April 17 – Good Friday
- May 1 – Labor Day
- May 6 – Araw ng Kagitingan (Bataan, Corregidor and Besang Pass Day)
- June 12 – Independence Day

After the issuance of EO Nos. 203 and 292

Regular holidays

- August 30 – National Heroes Day
- November 30 – Bonifacio Day
- December 25 – Christmas Day
- December 30 – Rizal Day

Nationwide special days

- November 1 – All Saints Day
- December 31 – Last Day of the Year

== Entertainment and culture ==
- March 1 – ABS-CBN launches the Star Network for the relaunch of Channel 2 after six months and the first white tri-ribbon 2 logo laced with a rhomboidal star came to be.
- March 2 – TV Patrol was launched as its first flagship evening newscast replacing the former flagship national news program Balita Ngayon.

== Sports ==
- June 23 – The Tanduay Rhum Makers win the 1987 PBA Open Conference finals against the Great Taste Coffee Makers, 134-120
- August 8 – UAAP Games Green Archers was First Won Against Growling Tigers was Score 72–63.
- August 23 – UAAP Games Blue Eagles was First Won Against Green Archers was Score 95-91.
- September 5 – UAAP Games Green Archers was Won Again Against Growling Tigers was Score 68–60 in Green Archers First Won Meeting on UAAP Games.
- September 8 – The Great Taste Coffee Makers win the 1987 PBA All-Filipino Conference finals against the Hills Bros. Coffee Kings.
- September 26 – UAAP Games Blue Eagles was won Again Against Green Archers was score 98-89 in Blue Eagles First Won Meeting on UAAP Games.
- October 4 – The Ateneo Blue Eagles win the UAAP Season 50 men's basketball championship against the UE Red Warriors, 94–92.
- October 11 – The Letran Knights win the NCAA Season 63 men's basketball championship against the San Sebastian Stags.
- December 13 – The San Miguel Beermen win the 1987 PBA Reinforced Conference finals against the Hills Bros. Coffee Kings.

== Births ==
- January 16 – Sheena Halili
- January 25 – Japeth Aguilar
- March 3 – Richard Heydarian
- March 21 – Rocco Nacino
- March 29 – Andi Manzano
- May 15 – Jennylyn Mercado
- May 26 – Bangs Garcia
- June 1 – Johan Santos
- August 23 – Nikki Gil
- September 26 – Maricris Garcia
- September 29 – Max Eigenmann
- September 30 – Denise Laurel
- October 1 – Tom Rodriguez
- October 10 – Rodjun Cruz
- October 17 – Bea Alonzo
- October 22 – Jade Lopez
- October 30 – Kevin Belingon, mixed martial artist and former MMA World Champion
- November 3 – Sebastian Duterte
- December 21 – Ryza Cenon
- December 21 – Valerie Concepcion
- December 25 – Bettina Carlos
- December 25 – LJ Reyes
- December 30 – Jake Cuenca

== Deaths ==
- February 27 – Jose W. Diokno, nationalist and human rights advocate, aged 65.
- March 4 – Rafael Salas, Undersecretary General of the United Nations and Executive Director of the UN Fund for Population Activities, Executive Secretary (1966–1969), aged 59
- May 3 – Roberto Concepcion
- August 2 – Jaime Ferrer, local government minister, aged 70.
- August 24 – Jose Caballero
- September 19 – Leandro Alejandro, secretary-general of BAYAN and oppositionist, aged 27.
- December 7 – Jaime Ongpin, former Secretary of Finance
- December 20 – Ruben Ecleo Sr., founder of the Philippine Benevolent Missionaries Association, Inc. and mayor of Dinagat, Surigao del Norte since 1963.
- December 23 – Pablo Gomez Sarino, former and longest serving municipal mayor of Bacoor, Cavite, aged 76.

== See also ==
- 1986–1987 Philippine coup attempts
- Philippines
