= Francis Lopez =

Francis Lopez may refer to:

- Francis Lopez (basketball) (born 2003), Filipino basketball player
- Francis Lopez (composer) (1916–1995), French composer

== See also ==
- Fhrancis Lopez (born 1989), Filipino model
