= Tantay =

Tantay is a last name. Notable people with this last name include:

- Al Tantay (born 1956), Filipino film actor
- Antonio Tantay (1920–1988), Filipino basketball player
