= 1989 in the Philippines =

- Decades: 1960s; 1970s; 1980s; 1990s; 2000s
- See also: List of years in the Philippines; films

1989 in the Philippines details events of note that happened in the Philippines in the year 1989.

== Incumbents ==
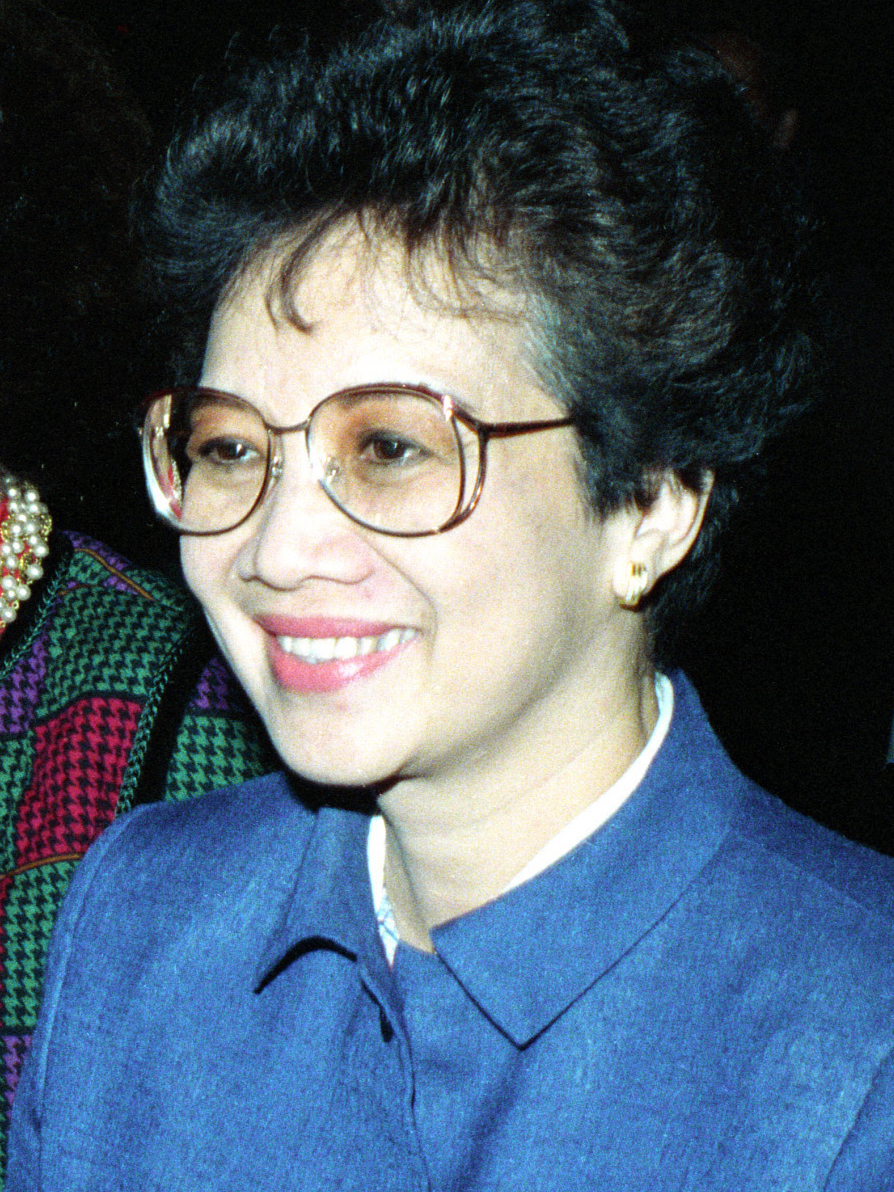
Corazon S.
Aquino

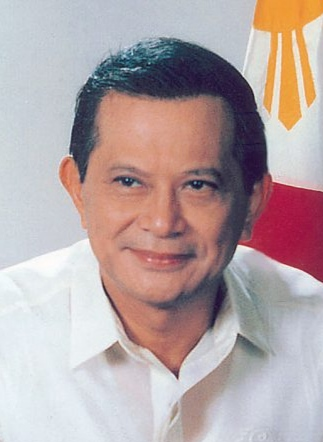
Salvador H.
Laurel

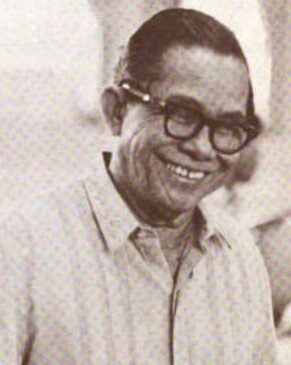
Jovito R.
Salonga

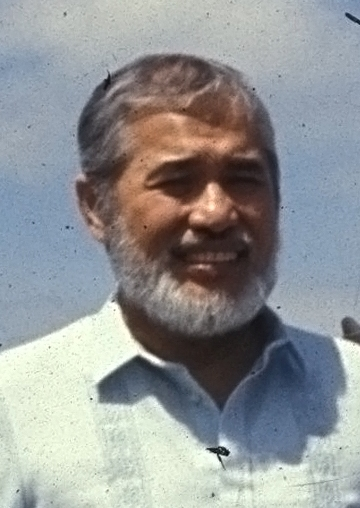
Ramon V.
Mitra Jr.

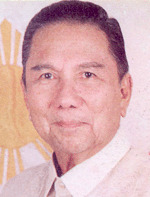
Marcelo B.
Fernan

- President: Corazon Aquino (PDP-Laban)
- Vice President: Salvador Laurel (Nacionalista)
- Senate President: Jovito Salonga
- House Speaker: Ramon Mitra, Jr.
- Chief Justice: Marcelo Fernan
- Philippine Congress: 8th Congress of the Philippines

== Events ==
=== January ===
- January 5–7 – Eight mutinous policemen led by Pat. Rizal Alih take hostage Philippine Constabulary regional commander Brig. Gen. Eduardo Batalla, his aide, Col. Romeo Abendan, and five others in Camp Cawa-Cawa, Zamboanga City. The siege ends, Jan. 7, in an assault by government forces, destroying buildings in the PC Regional Command headquarters and leaving a general, colonel and 14 renegades dead. Alih escapes; would be arrested in Malaysia in 1994, extradited in 2006, and detained until his death in 2015.

=== March ===
- March 31 – The famous alleged Marian apparition in Agoo, La Union to Judiel Nieva, a teenager who later become a transgender took place. It was said that the Blessed Virgin appeared on a guava tree, delivering messages and prophecies to Judiel. It became a highly sensational event for many Filipino Catholics as millions of pilgrims came to Agoo to see the phenomena like the "sun dancing", a statue of the Virgin Mary crying tears of blood, etc. The events in Agoo drew the attention of Catholic hierarchy in Rome, which conducted a thorough investigation on the events. In 1993, the events of Agoo apparitions are declared "non constat de supernaturalitate" (condemned) by the Catholic Bishops Conference of the Philippines and the judgment of Bishop Salvador L. Lazo of San Fernando diocese who was its Ordinary during the phenomena.
- March 28 – Elections were held in the country's 42,000 barangays.

=== April ===
- April 21 – U.S. Army Col. James Rowe is assassinated by the Communists in Quezon City; incident prompts the issue of removal of the U.S. military bases from the country. In 1991, the city Regional Trial Court would convict Donato Continente and Juanito Itaas in connection to the incident that also wounds the soldier's driver.

=== May ===
- May 30 – A mining community in Mount Diwata, Monkayo, then part of Davao del Norte, collapses from heavy rain, resulting in the deaths of thousands, mostly miners, in what would be the worst disaster in the area.

=== June ===
- June 30 – University of the Philippines President Jose V. Abueva and Defense Secretary Fidel V. Ramos signs the UP–DND accord that sets out a guideline for law enforcers in conducting their operations inside the university.

=== July ===
- July 13 – A military tribunal acquits 23 soldiers who are charged with murder regarding the deaths of 17 civilians in a military encounter in Lupao, Nueva Ecija in 1987, asserting before that those slain were communist guerrillas.
- July 28 – Satur Ocampo, leader of the National Democratic Front and chief rebel negotiator in peace talks, and his wife Carolina Malay, both former journalists, are arrested. They have been charged in court on July 24 for allegedly leading the execution of suspected military spies in Quezon.

=== August ===
- August 1 – The Autonomous Region in Muslim Mindanao is created through Republic Act No. 6734 also known as the Organic Act.
- August 13–15 – A hostage crisis at the Davao Metropolitan District Command Center (Davao Metrodiscom) occurs, perpetrated by the group of inmates led by Felipe Pugoy and Mohammad Nazir Samparani which resulted to the death of five hostages and all 16 inmates.

=== September ===
- September 20 – Lea Salonga begins her performance in Miss Saigon musical in London for leading role as Kim.
- September 28 – Former President Ferdinand Marcos dies in an inter-organ failure at his hospital in Honolulu, Hawaii.

=== October ===
- October 1–13 – Typhoons Angela (Rubing), Dan (Saling), and Elsie (Tasing) impact the country in two weeks.

=== November ===
- November 19 – A plebiscite is held in the ARMM, resulting in the ratification of RA 6734 that established the region, with the inclusion of the provinces of Lanao del Sur (including Marawi City), Maguindanao del Norte (including Cotabato City), Maguindanao del Sur, Sulu and Tawi-Tawi.

=== December ===
- December 1–9 – A coup d'état against the government of Philippine President Corazon Aquino is staged by members of the Armed Forces of the Philippines belonging to the Reform the Armed Forces Movement (RAM) and soldiers loyal to former President Ferdinand Marcos led by Colonel Gregorio Honasan, General Edgardo Abenina, and retired General Jose Ma. Zumel.

== Holidays ==
As per Executive Order No. 292, chapter 7 section 26, the following are regular holidays and special days, approved on July 25, 1987. Note that in the list, holidays in bold are "regular holidays" and those in italics are "nationwide special days".

- January 1 – **New Year's Day**
- March 23 – **Maundy Thursday**
- March 24 – **Good Friday**
- April 9 – **Araw ng Kagitingan (Bataan and Corregidor Day)**
- May 1 – **Labor Day**
- June 12 – **Independence Day**
- August 27 – **National Heroes Day**
- November 1 – All Saints Day
- November 30 – **Bonifacio Day**
- December 25 – **Christmas Day**
- December 30 – **Rizal Day**
- December 31 – Last Day of the Year

In addition, several other places observe local holidays, such as the foundation of their town. These are also "special days."

== Births ==
- January 9 – Fely Irvine, Australian entertainer of half-Filipino and half-Scottish ancestry
- January 12 – Arci Muñoz, actress, commercial model and lead singer of the band 'Philia'
- January 21 – Miguel Luis Villafuerte, politician and model
- January 22:
  - Rich Asuncion, actress
  - RJ Padilla, actor
- January 24 – Chris Banchero, basketball player
- January 25 – Yasmien Kurdi, actress, singer and mother
- January 29 – Dawn Chang, actress and member of Girltrends
- February 3 – Fhrancis Lopez, actor and model
- February 5 – Cristine Reyes, Filipina actress
- February 11:
  - Kaye Cal, singer-songwriter
  - Lovi Poe, actress and singer
- February 12 – Ram Revilla, actor (d. 2011)
- February 14 – Paul Lee, basketball player
- March 3 – Sef Cadayona, actor
- March 7 – Gerald Anderson, Filipino-American actor
- March 31 – Benjamin Alves, actor
- April 2 – Danita Paner, Filipina singer and actress
- April 12:
  - Dominic Roco, actor
  - Felix Roco, actor
- May 15 – Stephan Palla, football player
- May 17 – Kris Bernal, actress
- June 8 – Tomas Trigo, football player
- June 12 – Krista Kleiner, Filipina-American beauty queen, singer, model, actress and martial artist
- June 17 – Vico Sotto, Mayor of Pasig
- July 2 – Emman Monfort, basketball player
- July 7 – JP Erram, basketball player
- July 12 – Xian Lim, Chinese-Filipino actor
- July 13:
  - Justin Chua, basketball player
  - Mary Joy Tabal, marathon runner
- July 16 – Samantha Nierras, football player
- July 20 – Rayver Cruz, actor and dancer
- July 26 – Janelle Quintana, actress
- August 2 – Raymond Almazan, basketball player
- August 18 – Nikki Bacolod, actress and singer
- August 21 – Tina Marasigan, news anchor
- August 22 – Chariz Solomon, actress
- September 2 – Carl Guevara, actor and model
- September 21 – Jef Gaitan, actress
- September 21 - Angelo Patrimonio, basketball player and actor
- September 24:
  - Pia Wurtzbach, Miss Universe 2015
  - Michael Juico, basketball player
- September 25 – Honorio Banario, mixed martial artist and former MMA World Champion
- September 27 – Robi Domingo, actor
- October 2 – Janine Gutierrez, Cebuano-Filipina actress, television host and commercial model.
- October 18 – Sarah Elago, activist and politician
- October 19 – Janine Tugonon, Miss Universe 2012, 1st runner–up
- October 30 – Ryan Arabejo, swimmer
- November 6 – Shaina Magdayao, actress
- November 12 – Gino M. Santos, director and producer
- November 15 – Jona, singer
- November 17 – June Mar Fajardo, basketball player
- November 21 – Ejay Falcon, actor and Vice Governor of Oriental Mindoro
- November 22 – Valerie Weigmann, actress and TV host
- November 26 – Angeline Quinto, actress and singer
- November 30 – LA Revilla, basketball player
- December 11 – Sam Pinto, actress
- December 15 – Cora Waddell, actress
- December 26 – Jennica Garcia, actress
- December 28 – Jill Yulo, actress
- December 30 – Sabrina, singer

== Deaths ==
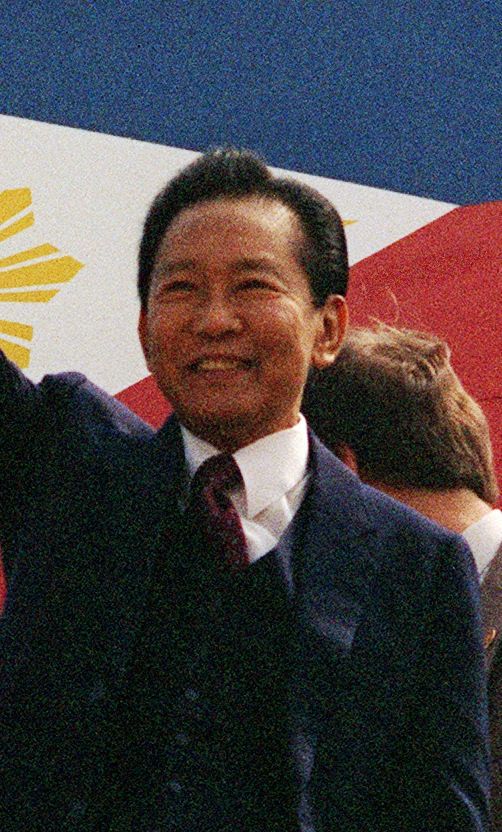
Ferdinand Marcos

- January 27 – Bayani Casimiro, Sr., Filipino dancer (b. 1918)
- April 21 – James N. Rowe, United States Army officer (b. 1938)
- August 19 – Alfredo Montelibano Sr., politician and industrialist (b. 1905)
- September 28 – Ferdinand Marcos, President of the Philippines (b. 1917)
- December 1 – Danilo Atienza, pilot (b. 1951)
