= Eugene A. Tan =

Filipino human rights lawyer, author and professor of law

Eugene Alvarez Tan
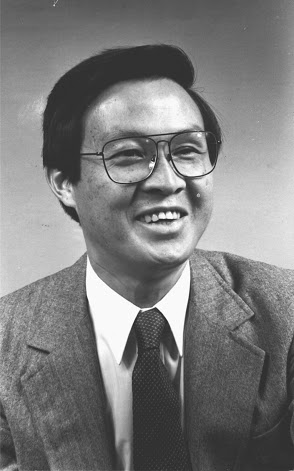
- Eugene A Tan
- Born: Eugene Alvarez Tan; 1943; Sapi-an, Capiz
- Disappeared: 14 November 1994 (aged 50–51); Muntinlupa, Metro Manila
- Status: Found dead with his driver three days later
- Died: 18 November 1994 (aged 50–51); Philippines
- Cause of death: Murder
- Body discovered: Dasmariñas, Cavite
- Education: Valedictorian LL.B.
- Alma mater: Ateneo de Manila University
- Occupation: Lawyer
- Years active: 1968-1994
- Notable work: The Philippine Law On Agency, Primer On Industrial and Intellectual Property Laws of the Philippines

Eugene Alvarez Tan (1943–1994) was a Filipino human rights lawyer, author, and professor of law. He was murdered in 1994.

Tan was elected president and chairman of the Maritime Law Association of the Philippines, President Philippine Bar Association from 1987 to 1988 and national president of the Integrated Bar of the Philippines from 1990 to 1991.

Tan was lead representative advocate in many key landmark cases including the abolition of boarding fees levied on air and sea travel passengers in 1989; an increase in death benefits to Filipino seamen in 1989 and successful in his bid to win a hike in the basic stipend of policemen in 1970.

He questioned the authority of the 1971 Constitutional Convention to adopt the parliamentary form of government, actively represented the challenge of the legality of Marcos’ Presidential Commitment Order (PCO) in 1983. Alongside Justice J.B.L. Reyes and others he assailed the legality of the Snap Elections called by Pres. Marcos in 1985, and panel member of the fact-finding committee appointed by the Philippine government in 1995 who investigated the Escalante Massacres.

By 1990, Tan was elected national president of the Integrated Bar of the Philippines (IBP).

Over subsequent years, and until his sudden death, Tan went on to be conferred with several awards in the field of Maritime law, Human Rights and Social Justice Advocacy. He remained a champion of legal advocacy and a social rights activist in the Philippine community, and was recognised by conferment of a royal title and appointments to various boards and committees of interest nationwide and internationally.

== Childhood ==
Tan was born during the Japanese occupation in the town of Sapi-an, Capiz, to a Chinese immigrant, Tan Chun, and a local woman, Fidelina Alvarez.

Tan was blinded in one eye as a child, after an accident.

== Education ==
Tan graduated Law with top honors as valedictorian and was admitted to the Philippine Bar in 1968.

== Qualifications ==
Valedictorian, LL.B. College of Law, Ateneo de Manila University, Philippines.

== Career ==
Tan was the first president and the founder of the Fraternal Order of Utopia, a Law School Fraternity established in the Ateneo de Manila University Law School in 1964
and began his career in 1968 as a junior lawyer at Ross, Selph, Salcedo, Del Rosario, Bito and Misa in Metro Manila after his call to bar.

In 1983 he received an Outstanding Young Persons of the World Meritorious Award in the field of Law in the Philippines (TOYP).

By 1976, Tan set up practice in partnership specialising in intellectual property, admiralty and maritime practice with Ignacio S. Sapalo establishing Tan & Sapalo Law Offices. In 1977, the firm became Tan, Sapalo, Manzano & Velez Law Offices and is today known as Sapalo Velez Bundang and Bulilan.

Tan was a member of the board of trustees in 1982, vice-president for legal from 1982 to 1983, executive vice-president from 1983 to 1986; president from 1986 to 1987 and chairman, 1987–1988 of the Maritime Law Association of the Philippines (MARLAW)

Tan was appointed director in 1982, vice-president from 1986 to 1987 and president, 1987–1988 of the Philippine Bar Association (PBA)
and was elected president of the Integrated Bar of the Philippines in 1989.

During Tan's tenure in November 1990, Integrated Bar of the Philippines (IBP) staff filed a complaint alleging favouritism and discrimination with Tan's employment practices which amounted to nothing. The adjudication of this matter set precedent in jurisprudence and was cited in 1999 In The Matter Of The Petition To Remove Atty. Jose A. Grapilon As President, Integrated Bar Of The Philippines in 1999.

During Tan's career, he was a professor of law, College of Law, Ateneo de Manila University and appointed by the Philippine government as member of the Escalante Massacre Fact Finding Committee (EFPC) to investigate the civilians by the military (1984)., he was also member of the advisory board of International and Comparative Law Centre Of The South-western Legal Foundation (now The Center for American and International Law) of the University of Texas Dallas (1987–1991)..

== Career highlights ==
Within the legal community in the Philippines and in many other legal quarters, Tan urged, fought and pushed for changes to the Philippine judicial system.

Notably, Tan's election to the Integrated Bar of the Philippines set precedent in that it broke a stronghold trend of almost two decades at the commission where he was the first small-time lawyer in many years from the Capiz chapter to be President Elect but it was also an opportunity for him to speak out and act to implement changes many of which later came to form part of the framework of the Commission on Bar Investigation and Discipline.

Through the CBID retired justices were able to investigate charges against erring lawyers and protect them from harassment independently.

Tan successfully supported the transition to independence of the IBP asserting the role of IBP as an independent union of lawyers mandated by the Constitution and the law enabling the IBP to provide a complementary institution supporting the courts in checking and maintaining a balance to judicial abuses.

== Publications ==
The Philippine Law On Agency, 1979 Edition.

Primer On Industrial and Intellectual Property Laws of the Philippines, 1987 Edition

== Death ==
On the night of November 14, 1994, Tan and his driver, Eduardo Constantino, were kidnapped by several men in Metro Manila near Tan's home in Alabang, Muntinlupa, Metro Manila.

On November 18, 1994, after three days during which details of the kidnap were held from the public in hopes of aiding their return, Tan and his driver were found dead in Dasmariñas, Cavite.

Following the incident on November 22, 1994, the International Commission of Jurists made a demand for a thorough investigation and swift prosecution of the perpetrators, and there have been references since Tan's death to the 'sloppy' investigation of the kidnap and murders and since Tan's death there have been several lawsuits, appeals, counter suits and much judicial haranguing following few arrests after an order was given to Philippine police by the then President Fidel Ramos to deliver the perpetrators to the justice system. Over almost two decades of embroiled proceedings there is only one conviction recorded in the matter of the murder of Tan and his driver Constantino.

At the time of his death, Eugene was survived by his wife, Cynthia Ledesma from Kabankalan, Negros Occidental, and five children: Eugene II; Eugene III; Eunice; Louisine; and Eugene IV.
