= Hultman–Chapman murder case =

1991 murder case in the Philippines

People of the Philippines vs. Claudio Teehankee Jr.
Decided 6 October 1995

Ponente Reynato Puno

G.R. Nos. 111206-08
- Unanimous; Regalado, Mendoza and Francisco, JJ., concur; Narvasa, C.J., was on leave.

The Hultman–Chapman murder case (formally People of the Philippines vs. Claudio Teehankee Jr.) was a high-profile murder case in the Philippines during the early 1990s. The case gained wide publicity due to the involvement of Claudio Teehankee Jr., the son of former Chief Justice Claudio Teehankee and the brother of former Justice Undersecretary Manuel Teehankee. The case helped sway the public view and lawmakers on crime and the restoration of the death penalty in the Philippines.

== Crime and arrest ==
According to court records, Roland John Chapman, Maureen Hultman, and another friend, Jussi Olavi Leino, were coming home from a party at around three o'clock in the morning of 13 July 1991. Leino was walking Hultman home along Mahogany street in Dasmariñas, Makati when Teehankee came up behind them in his car. He stopped the two and demanded that they show some identification. Leino took out his wallet and showed Teehankee his Asian Development Bank ID. Teehankee grabbed the wallet. Chapman, who was waiting in a car for Leino, stepped in and asked Teehankee: "Why are you bothering us?" Teehankee drew out his gun and shot Chapman in the chest, killing him instantly. After a few minutes, Teehankee shot Leino, hitting him in the jaw. Then he shot Hultman on the temple before driving away. Leino survived and Hultman died two months later in hospital due to brain hemorrhages caused by the bullet fragments. Teehankee was arrested several days later on the testimony of several witnesses. The witnesses were Domingo Florence and Agripino Cadenas, private security guards, and Vincent Mangubat, a driver, all three being employees of residents of the village.

== Trial and sentence ==
The Supreme Court of the Philippines, on 6 March 1992, dismissed Teehankee Jr.'s certiorari petition to annul the trial court's admission of the amended information, the arraignment and appointment of Public Attorney's Office lawyer as counsel de oficio of Teehankee Jr., inter alia. On 22 December 1992, Judge Job B. Madayag, Makati Regional Trial Court, Branch 145, convicted Teehankee Jr. The Supreme Court of the Philippines on 6 October 1995, modified the trial court's decision and found Teehankee Jr. guilty of the crimes of murder, homicide and attempted murder, for which, he was meted out 3 sentences, respectively, reclusión perpetua (defined effectively as 30 years by the Revised Penal Code) and 2 indeterminate sentences of reclusion temporal, each for 8 years and 1 day to 14 years (now, as finally amended by the Supreme Court in 1995). Under Article 70 of the Revised Penal Code, the maximum combined sentences can exceed 40 years.

== Damages assessed ==
Teehankee Jr. was ordered to pay civil indemnity: in Criminal Case No. 91-4605, 50,000.00 Philippine Pesos as indemnity for the Chapman's death; 1,000,000.00 Pesos as moral damages; in Criminal Case No. 91-4606, 50,000.00 Pesos as indemnity for Maureen Navarro Hultman's death; 2,350,461.83 Pesos as actual damages; 564,042.57 Pesos for loss of earning capacity; 1,000,000.00 Pesos as moral damages; and 2,000,000.00 Pesos as exemplary damages; in Criminal Case No. 91-4807, 30,000.00 Pesos as indemnity for Jussi Olavi Leino's injuries; 118,369.84 Pesos and equivalent in Philippine Pesos of U.S.$55,600.00, both as actual damages; 1,000,000.00 Pesos as moral damages; and 2,000,000.00 Pesos as exemplary damages; In all 3 cases, to pay each of 3 offended parties the sum of 1,000,000.00 Pesos for attorney's fees and expenses of litigation.

== Restoration of death penalty ==
The killings of Chapman and Hultman, together with other notable heinous crimes such as the murder of Eldon Maguan and the Vizconde massacre compelled the Philippine Congress to restore the death penalty in the Philippines in 1993, which was previously made prohibited by the 1987 Philippine Constitution. The death penalty would again be barred in the Philippines after legislation to that effect was passed in 2006.

== Imprisonment ==
"Bobbins" or Claudio Jr. started serving the sentence on 24 June 1991, by virtue of his preventive detention at the Makati city jail, and then, at New Bilibid Prison in Muntinlupa since 16 January 1993. On the civil aspect, the trial Court approved the 19 November 1999 settlement signed by the Hultman family and the Teehankees, on 10 January 2000. The lower court issued entry of judgment on 17 February 2000, and on 13 January 2003, the Hultmans filed the Notice of Satisfaction of Judgment. Accordingly, Bobbins filed the petition for executive clemency on 22 December 2003, since he already served a total of 13 years and 5 months of actual time, equivalent to 15 years under the Good Conduct Credits rules and guidelines. Formal notices of the application were published in the newspapers, inter alia, to all parties concerned, on 28 January and 6 February 2004 with no oppositions filed. By virtue of the Presidential Order of Commutation dated 30 September 2008, Bobbins is just one of 1,430 released who were similarly situated. Thus, on 3 October 2008, based on actual time served of 17 years, 2 months and 9 days, equivalent to legal 21 years, 5 months and 3 days, Bobbins was freed. Vivian and Anders Hultman belatedly protested the release in media.

== Presidential clemency ==
On 6 October 2008, Raul M. Gonzalez confirmed Claudio Teehankee Jr.'s release from prison by virtue of President Gloria Macapagal Arroyo' commutation of sentence: "Everything went by the rules here. His [Teehankee's] records have been reviewed by the Board of Pardons and Parole before a recommendation was given to the President." Raul M. Gonzalez further stated that: "I would assume that he already paid the civil liabilities." Philippine Daily Inquirer reported about P15 million as total damages. NBP Supt. Ramon Reyes said Teehankee was released based on "good conduct time allowance," or GCTA: "The release of Mr. Teehankee underwent a rigorous review and it was signed by the Secretary of Justice, Raul Gonzalez."

== Appeal ==
On 15 October 2008, attorney Ernesto Francisco, for Maureen Hultman, Roland John Chapman, and Jussi Olavi Leino, filed a 62-page certiorari petition with the Supreme Court of the Philippines against the Department of Justice (Philippines) and the Board of Pardons and Parole, to nullify Teehankee's granted executive clemency, commutation of sentence and release from detention. The petition alleged violation of the "Amended Guidelines for Recommending Executive Clemency" and Teehankee's failure to pay the amounts of P 2,050,000 to Chapman and the amounts of P4,148,369.84 and US$55,600 to Leino. Secretary Raul M. Gonzalez earlier stated that the clemency has already "taken effect and it can't be taken back unless there was fraud ... mathematical error and misapplication of rules. I don't think so. Otherwise, the Supreme Court will traverse the separation of powers." The Supreme Court of the Philippines docketed the case as G.R. No. 184679 and required, on 21 October 2008, the public respondents and Teehankee Jr. to file "Comment."
