= 1990 in the Philippines =

- Decades: 1970s; 1980s; 1990s; 2000s; 2010s
- See also: List of years in the Philippines; films

1990 in the Philippines details events of note that happened in the Philippines in the year 1990.

== Incumbents ==
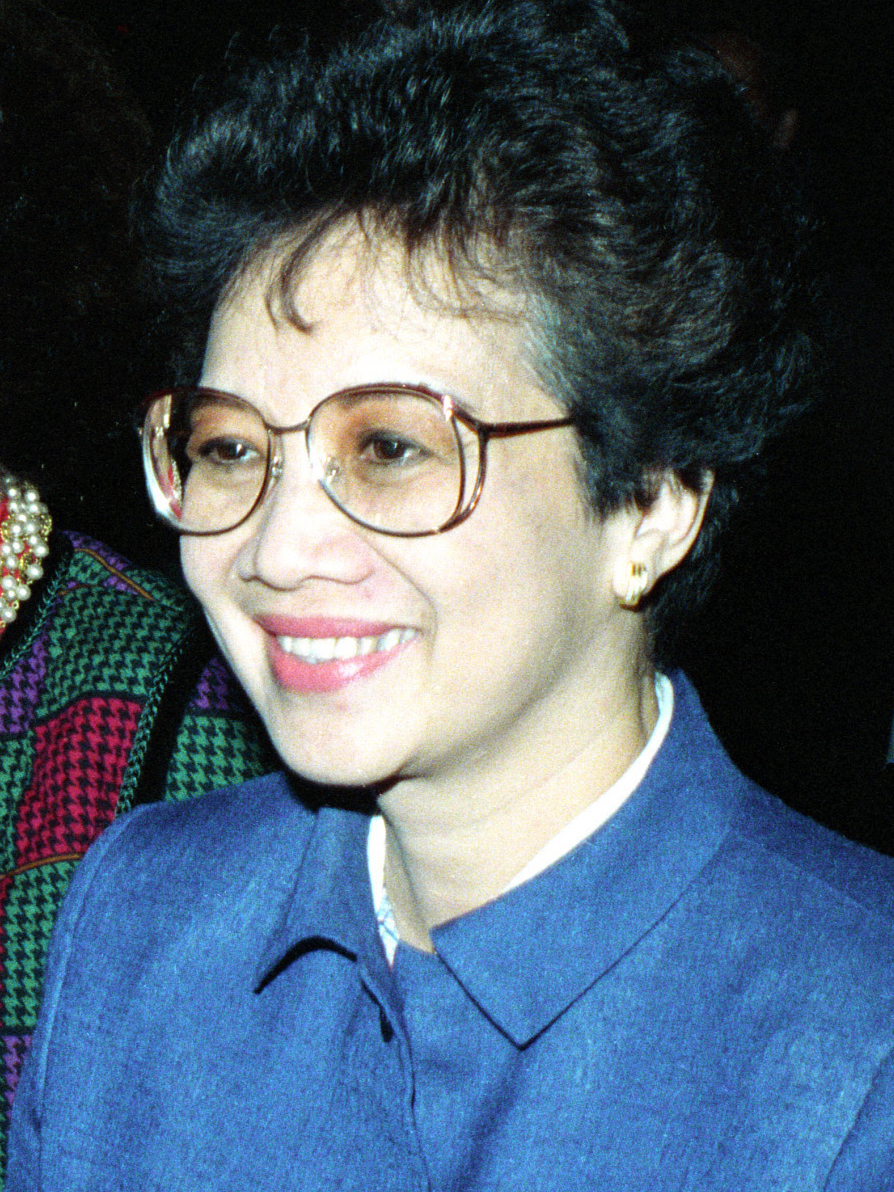
Corazon S.
Aquino

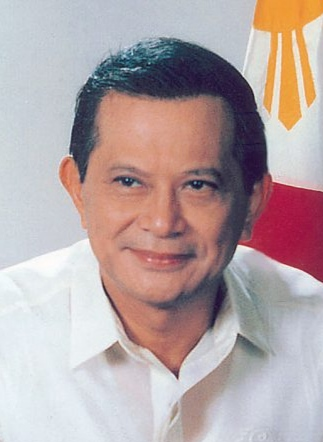
Salvador H.
Laurel

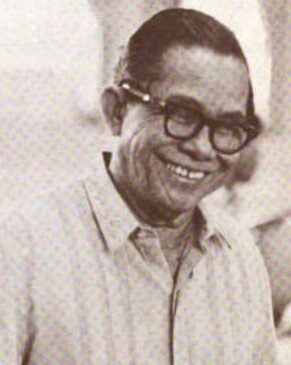
Jovito R.
Salonga

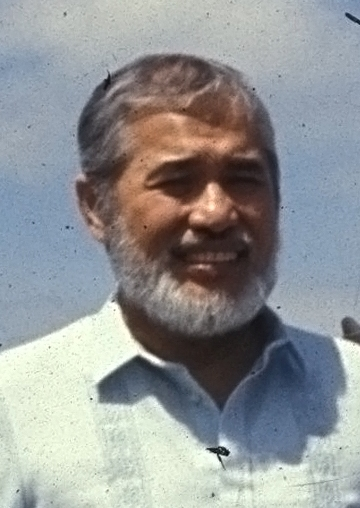
Ramon V.
Mitra Jr.

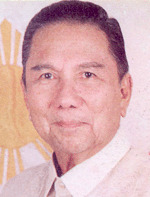
Marcelo B.
Fernan

- President: Corazon Aquino (PDP-Laban)
- Vice President: Salvador Laurel (Nacionalista)
- Senate President: Jovito Salonga
- House Speaker: Ramon Mitra, Jr.
- Chief Justice: Marcelo Fernan
- Philippine Congress: 8th Congress of the Philippines

== Events ==
=== January ===
- January 30 – Majority of voters in the Cordillera Administrative Region reject the creation of an autonomous entity in what would be the region's first referendum, as provided by the Organic Act (Republic Act No. 6766) that has approved the previous year, with Ifugao as the only province to vote for it.

=== February ===
- February 12 – General elections are held for the first time in the newly created Autonomous Region in Muslim Mindanao for the Regional Governor and Vice-Governor.
- February 27 – Sen. Juan Ponce Enrile is arrested regarding his involvement in the December 1989 coup attempt.

=== March ===
- March 4 – Hotel Delfino in Tuguegarao, Cagayan is seized by suspended Cagayan governor Rodolfo Aguinaldo commanding his private army estimated at 300 men. His suspension as governor in January 1990 and his subsequent indictment on charges of rebellion and murder were both related to his support for the Dec. 1-9, 1989 failed coup attempt against President Corazon Aquino. Brig. Gen. Oscar Florendo, sent by Aquino to serve Aguinaldo with an arrest warrant, was captured by Aguinaldo's men and later shot in the hotel, he died of his wounds. Hours of standoff ensued until nearly 1,000 government troops attacked the hotel to dislodge Aguinaldo's forces. In this siege at least a dozen others were killed in or around the hotel. Following the melee, Aguinaldo fled with about 90 fighters for mountains in the north.

=== April ===
- April 23 – A power outage hits Makati, along with neighboring areas, during an ongoing, widespread daily crisis, affecting more than 300 government and major office buildings.
- April 25 – Two U.P. Students, Ernesto "Cochise" Bernabe II and his girlfriend Anna Lourdes "Beebom" Castanos were abducted and killed in Pampanga. Their decomposing bodies are found on June 25–26.

=== May ===
- May 13 – Gunmen kill two United States Air Force airmen near Clark Air Base on the eve of talks between the Philippines and the United States over the future of American military bases in the Philippines.

=== June ===
- June 12 – A tornado hit a village in Manukan, Zamboanga del Norte. It destroys 154 houses, along with multiple infrastructures and agricultural crops, amounting to about ₱40-million. It kills a total of 51 people and injures more than a hundred others.
- June 29 – U.S. Peace Corps remove 261 volunteers from the country amid Communist threats.

=== July ===
- July 2 – A court in New York, United States acquits former First Lady Imelda Marcos of racketeering and fraud charges regarding accusations of investing the Philippine treasury's money to the US.
- July 16 – An earthquake with a 7.8 M_{s} strikes Luzon. It kills around 2,000 and leaves damages of at least ₱10-billion, mainly from Metro Manila and regions in northern and central Luzon, especially Baguio, the most devastated, as well as Dagupan and Cabanatuan.

=== September ===
- September 28 – Sixteen military members are convicted and sentenced to life imprisonment regarding the 1983 assassination of Sen. Aquino.

=== October ===
- October 4–6 – Forces loyal to Col. Alexander Noble declare the independence of Mindanao and seize two military garrisons in Cagayan de Oro and Butuan. The rebels are isolated by government forces and Noble surrenders on October 6.

=== November ===
- November 12 – Typhoon Ruping slams Visayas and affects Cebu City, Bacolod, and other key cities in the Visayas.
- November 16 – Autonomous Region in Muslim Mindanao is officially founded.

=== December ===
- December 19 – The military tribunal convicts 81 army personnel of mutiny in relation to the August 1987 coup attempt, giving them 12–20-year prison sentences at hard labor.

== Holidays ==
As per Executive Order No. 292, chapter 7 section 26, the following are regular holidays and special days, approved on July 25, 1987. Note that in the list, holidays in bold are "regular holidays" and those in italics are "nationwide special days".

- January 1 – **New Year's Day**
- April 9 – **Araw ng Kagitingan** (Day of Valor)
- April 12 – **Maundy Thursday**
- April 13 – **Good Friday**
- April 14 – Holy Saturday
- May 1 – **Labor Day**
- June 12 – **Independence Day**
- August 26 – **National Heroes Day**
- November 1 – All Saints Day
- November 30 – **Bonifacio Day**
- December 24 – Christmas Eve
- December 25 – **Christmas Day**
- December 30 – **Rizal Day**
- December 31 – Last Day of the Year

In addition, several other places observe local holidays, such as the foundation of their town. These are also "special days."

== Sports ==
- September 22–October 7 – The Philippines participates in the 1990 Asian Games held in Beijing, China and it ranks 13th with one gold medal, two silver medals and seven bronze medals with an overall total of ten medals.

== Births ==
- January 8 – Melissa Ricks, actress
- January 12 – RR Garcia, basketball player
- January 14 – Mikee Lee, actor, model and host
- February 1 – Ryan Buenafe, basketball player
- February 7 – Neil Etheridge, football player
- February 12 – Joana Houplin, football player
- February 13 – John Riel Casimero, boxer
- February 15 – Patrick Deyto, football player
- February 17:
  - Michelle Gavagan, model, environmentalist, Miss Philippines Fire 2011
  - Bea Rose Santiago, Miss International 2013
- February 20 – Ken Alfonso, actor and model
- February 27 – Megan Young, actress and Miss World 2013
- March 8 – Nico Salva, basketball player
- March 24 – Aljur Abrenica, actor
- March 26 – Matteo Guidicelli, actor
- March 27 – Jake Ejercito, actor and model
- April 19:
  - Kim Chiu, actress
  - Gretchen Ho, beach and indoor volleyball player and TV host
- April 27 – Jackie Rice, actress
- May 4 – Andrea Torres, TV/film actress and commercial model
- May 9:
  - Harold Arboleda, basketball player
  - Maxine Medina, designer, model, beauty pageant titleholder, actress and TV host
- June 3 – Juneric Baloria, basketball player
- June 10 – Valeen Montenegro, actress
- June 12 – Eric Camson, basketball player
- June 19 – Jason Dy, singer
- June 25:
  - Andi Eigenmann, actress
  - Chris Newsome, basketball player
- June 27 – Angelia Ong, model and beauty queen
- July 5 – Arron Villaflor, actor and model
- July 13 – Matt Ganuelas-Rosser, basketball player
- July 17 – Hiyasmin Neri, actress and host
- July 20 – Dominic Roque, actor and model
- July 23 – Young JV, singer-songwriter
- August 3 – Sophie Albert, actress
- August 10 – Gwen Zamora, actress
- August 12 – Enzo Pineda, actor
- August 29 – Rizzini Alexis Gomez, 2012 Miss Tourism International titleholder (d. 2015)
- September 16 – Nar Cabico, singer
- September 20 – Erich Gonzales, actress
- September 21 – Ivan Dorschner, actor
- September 27 – Charee Pineda, actress
- September 29 – Gerphil Flores, classical singer
- October 3 – Rhian Ramos, actress
- October 11 – Jericho Cruz, basketball player
- November 16 – Arjo Atayde, actor
- November 20 – Rodney Brondial, basketball player
- December 2 – Abra, rapper
- December 11 – Rome dela Rosa, basketball player
- December 21 – Sam Mangubat, singer
- December 23 – Anna Maria Perez de Tagle, actress and singer

== Deaths ==
- February 7 – Alfredo M. Santos, Chief of Staff of the Armed Forces of the Philippines (1962–65) (b. 1905)
- May 12 – Anastacio Caedo, Filipino sculptor (b. 1907)
- June 30 – Miguel Cuenco, lawyer and politician (b. 1904)
- December 20 – Lauro Mumar, Olympic basketball player (b. 1924)
