= 1992 in the Philippines =

- Decades: 1970s; 1980s; 1990s; 2000s; 2010s
- See also: List of years in the Philippines; films

1992 in the Philippines details events of note that happened in the Philippines in the year 1992.

== Incumbents ==
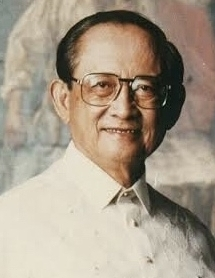
Fidel V.
Ramos

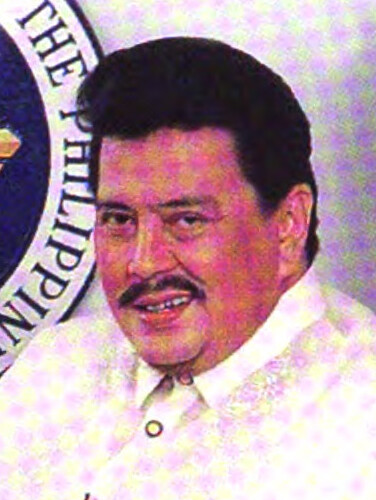
Joseph E.
Estrada

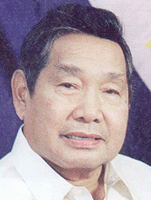
Neptali A.
Gonzales Sr.

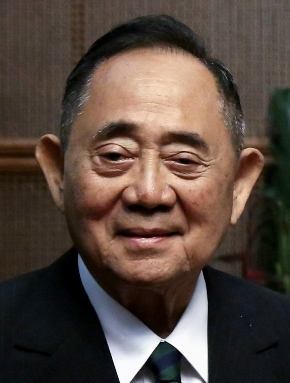
Jose C.
de Venecia Jr.

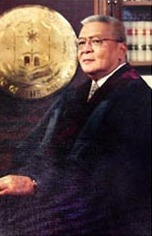
Andres D.
Narvasa

- President
  - Corazon Aquino (PDP–Laban) (until June 30)
  - Fidel V. Ramos (Lakas) (starting June 30)
- Vice President
  - Salvador Laurel (Nacionalista) (until June 30)
  - Joseph Estrada (NPC) (starting June 30)
- Senate President
  - Jovito Salonga (until January 1)
  - Neptali Gonzales, Sr. (starting January 1)
- House Speaker
  - Ramon Mitra, Jr. (until June 30)
  - Jose de Venecia, Jr. (starting July 27)
- Chief Justice: Andres Narvasa
- Philippine Congress
  - 8th Congress of the Philippines (until June 17)
  - 9th Congress of the Philippines (starting July 27)

== Events ==
=== January ===
- January 2 – The tailings dam breaks at Number Two tailings storage facility of Philex Mining Corporation's Padcal mine in Benguet Province, releasing 80 million cubic metres of effluent, probably the largest tailings spill in history.
- January 7 – Former First Lady Imelda Marcos is arrested and later released on charges regarding her accounts in Switzerland.
- January 15 – Pag-asa is hatched in Davao City becoming the first Philippine eagle to be successfully bred and hatched in captivity.

=== February ===
- February 15 – At least 41 are killed and 24 are wounded when New People's Army guerrillas ambush a large company of army troops in Marihatag, Surigao del Sur.

=== March ===
- Early March – The country begins to experience one of the worst post-war power crises, where blackouts, caused by power shortages, affects Metro Manila and southern Luzon and worsens by end of May; with the capital experiencing almost 60 blackouts since March 1.
- March 5 – A massive power outage throughout Metro Manila begins at mid-afternoon, with more than half of the region having electricity restored by early evening. It is caused by the overloaded Dolores-Marikina line, as well as the tripping of two major supply lines in southern Luzon a day earlier.
- March 10 – Five students of PUP are found floating in the Pasig River after an altercation during a basketball game involving INC members.
- March 18 – Pre-dawn police raids on five suspected hide-outs of the Red Scorpion Group, a kidnapping group consisting of suspected communist guerrillas, across Metro Manila reportedly leaves 10–14 people killed, while at least two women are arrested and three police officers are injured. In Las Piñas, Michael Barnes of California is rescued during a shootout. Barnes, vice president and general manager of Philippine Geothermal, Inc., a Unocal Corporation subsidiary, has been kidnaped on January 17.

=== May ===
- May 10 – Guerrillas of the New People's Army ambush a police patrol in Cagayan, killing fifteen policemen and injuring five others.
- May 11 – Synchronized national and local elections are held.
- May 25 – In PepsiCo's promotion Number Fever, the winning number "349" is announced with a million-peso prize; however, an error causes more than 600,000 winners; several violent incidents followed. By following year, about 22,000 people filed more than five thousand lawsuits against Pepsi, outnumbering those against former Pres. Ferdinand Marcos and Imelda Marcos. In 2006, a court would rule in favor of Pepsi.

=== June ===
- June 30 – Former defense secretary Fidel Ramos and former senator Joseph Estrada swear in as the 12th President and 11th Vice President of the Philippines, succeeding Corazon Aquino and Salvador Laurel.

=== July ===
- July 3 – The Supreme Court upholds a ruling by the Court of Appeals which has favored the civil suits filed by residents of Norzagaray, Bulacan, against the National Power Corporation, in connection with the flooding of the municipality during Typhoon Kading in 1978, which was purportedly caused by the latter's release of water from Angat Dam.

=== September ===
- September 22 – Pres. Ramos signs Republic Act 7636, which repeals the Anti-Subversion Act of 1957.
- September 30 – US forces leave Subic Bay Naval Base upon its turn over to the Philippines.

=== October ===
- October 1 – Nationwide power outages begin, continuing even in the first months of 1993.

=== November ===
- November 24:
  - Subic Bay Metropolitan Authority is formed by virtue of Republic Act 7227, known as the Bases Conversion and Development Act of 1992.
  - Subic Bay Naval Base closes as it is turned over to the local government, with a last batch of American soldiers finally leaving Naval Air Station Cubi Point and returning to the US, ending its military presence in the country.

== Holidays ==
As per Executive Order No. 292, chapter 7 section 26, the following are regular holidays and special days, approved last July 25, 1987. Note that in the list, holidays in bold are "regular holidays" and those in italics are "nationwide special days".

- January 1 – **New Year's Day**
- April 9 – **Araw ng Kagitingan (Bataan and Corregidor Day)**
- April 16 – **Maundy Thursday**
- April 17 – **Good Friday**
- May 1 – **Labor Day**
- June 12 – **Independence Day**
- August 30 – **National Heroes Day**
- November 1 – All Saints Day
- November 30 – **Bonifacio Day**
- December 25 – **Christmas Day**
- December 30 – **Rizal Day**
- December 31 – Last Day of the Year

In addition, several other places observe local holidays, such as the foundation of their town. These are also "special days."

== Television ==
- February 21 – Associated Broadcasting Company (ABC 5) resumes its radio-television operations with their slogans for station ID Come Home to ABC until the last day of July and Catch Up with Today TV in the first day of August.
- May 30 – Southern Broadcasting Network, a local UHF TV station in Metro Manila is launched. It was then known as World TV 21 (now Solar Television Network as ETC).

== Films ==
- 18th Metro Manila Film Festival
- Boy Recto
- Bakit Labis Kitang Mahal
- Engkanto
- Takbo Talon Tili!
- Shake, Rattle & Roll IV
- Manila Boy
- Okey Ka Fairy Ko!

== Sports ==
- March 20 – 28 – Pasig and Manila host the 1992 ISF Men's World Championship in which 18 nations participated.
- July 25 – August 9 – The **Philippines** compete at the **1992 Summer Olympics** in Barcelona, Spain. At least 26 competitors, 24 men and 2 women, took part in 29 events in 9 sports. Stephen Fernandez and Beatriz Lucero, both win a bronze medal in taekwondo, but their medals are not included in the official medal tally as taekwondo was only a demonstration event.
- August 24 – 29 – The team representing the Zamboanga City Little League wins the International Championship of the 1992 Little League World Series held in Pennsylvania. Later discovered that the team violated age and residency requirements and Little League stripped them of their title.

== Births ==
- January 2 – Alden Richards, actor and singer
- January 8 – Pamu Pamorada, actress
- January 20:
  - Mark Hartmann, football player
  - Troy Rosario, basketball player
- January 21 – Denden Lazaro, volleyball player
- February 4 – Francis Alcantara, tennis player
- February 7 – Kylie Verzosa, Miss International 2016
- February 12 – Joseph Eriobu, basketball player
- March 1 – Reden Celda, basketball player
- March 8 – Mervin Guarte, middle-distance runner (d. 2025)
- March 9 – Samboy de Leon, basketball player
- March 11 – KZ Tandingan, singer and recording artist
- March 16 – Terrence Romeo, basketball player
- March 23 – Ria Atayde, actress
- March 28 – Lucho Ayala, actor
- March 30 – Enrique Gil, actor and singer
- April 10 – Marion Aunor, singer and recording artist
- April 11 – Nesthy Petecio, boxer
- April 16 – Brian Poe Llamanzares, journalist and politician
- April 17 – Mutya Johanna Datul, Miss Supranational 2013
- April 19 – Ashley Rivera, actress
- April 28 – Dennis Villanueva, football player
- May 6 – Manuel Ott, football player
- May 8 – Vickie Rushton, actress, beauty pageant contestant and model
- May 9:
  - Chris Gutierrez, actor
  - Jiro Manio, actor
- May 10:
  - Jake Zyrus, singer and actor
  - Zia Marquez, actress
- May 20 – AJ Muhlach, singer and actor
- June 4 – Kiko Estrada, actor
- June 7 – Jordan Clarkson, basketball player
- June 16 – Roger Pogoy, basketball player
- June 30 – Alfred Labatos, actor
- July 4 – Carl Cari, politician
- July 9 – Jake Vargas, actor and singer
- July 27 – Mark L. Cruz, basketball player
- August 2 – Jio Jalalon, basketball player
- August 3 – Aljon Mariano, basketball player
- August 4 – Neil Coleta, actor
- August 6 – Victor Silayan, actor and model
- August 7 – Jeric Gonzales, actor
- August 9 – KaladKaren, actress and TV host
- August 28 – Max Collins, actress
- September 1 – Louise delos Reyes, actress
- September 2 – Michele Gumabao, beach and indoor volleyball player and beauty queen
- September 9 – Frencheska Farr, singer, model and actress
- September 24 – Coleen Garcia, actress
- September 29 – Baser Amer, basketball player
- October 17 – Sam Concepcion, singer, dancer, actor, host and model
- October 29 – Mon Abundo, basketball player
- November 10 – Samantha Bernardo, actress, beauty queen and model
- November 14 – Jaclyn Sawicki, football player
- November 20 – Yen Santos, actress
- November 25 – Martin del Rosario, actor

== Deaths ==
- February 3 – Jay Ilagan, actor (b. 1953)
- February 9 – Apeng Daldal, actor, comedian, vaudevillian, singer and writer (b. 1928)
- February 14 – Helen Vela, actress, broadcaster (b. 1946)
- March 9 – Isidro Rodriguez, 18th Governor of Rizal and softball sports official (b. 1915)
- March 22 – Joe Cantada, TV host, anchor and commentator (b. 1942)
- May 28 – Lorenzo Tañada, senator (b. 1898)
- August 17 – Tecla San Andres Ziga, senator (b. 1906)
- September 3 – César Bengzon, Chief Justice of the Supreme Court of the Philippines (b. 1896)
- December 2 – Jaime de la Rosa, pre-war and postwar actor (b. 1921)
