= Lason Batch =

1987 poisoning of Philippine Constabulary forces

Lason Batch mass poisoning
- Zamboanga City (Philippines)
- Location: Zamboanga City, Philippines
- Date: 5 September 1987
- Target: AFP troops
- Attack type: mass poisoning
- Weapon: poisoned water in plastic bags
- Deaths: 19
- Injuries: 140
- Victim: Government soldiers
- Perpetrator: Unknown (suspected to be communist rebels or Muslim separatists)

The Lason Batch refers to a 5 September 1987 mass poisoning attack against Philippine Constabulary forces on the island of Mindanao in the southern Philippines which caused the deaths of almost an entire platoon of soldiers and hospitalization of well over a hundred troops. The incident involved 18-19 year old soldiers running along roads near their camp on the outskirts of Zamboanga City where they had been newly stationed following completion of basic training. While jogging these troops were offered free ice water in small plastic bags by seeming civilians, but soon the majority of the 225 soldiers on the run fell ill. Over that Saturday and the following day 19 died and 140 were hospitalized. Initially it was thought those affected had suffered from heat stroke, but officers and attending physicians at the military hospital treating victims said they displayed classic symptoms of pesticide poisoning including disorientation, headaches, dizziness, stomach pains and vomiting of blood.

Those responsible for attacking this group of young soldiers—who came to be colloquially described in mixed language as "the Lason Batch" ("lason" means "poison" in Filipino)—were never identified, but perpetrators were most likely either communist rebels, Muslim separatists, or one of several domestic insurgent groups operating in strife-torn areas of Mindanao at the time. The casualty toll from this poisoning was one of the highest for attacks against Philippine military personnel, and resulted in the Armed Forces of the Philippines later instituting restrictions against its members accepting any food or beverages from civilians.
