= 1991 Thomas Jefferson Cultural Center bombing plot =

Iraqi bomb plot in Makati

On January 19, 1991, a failed bomb attack against the Thomas Jefferson Cultural Center in Makati, Philippines ended with one of the militants blowing himself up while trying to set the detonation timer. The plot was hatched by Iraqi intelligence in response to the Allied bombing of the Gulf War. Similar failed operations against American interests had already taken place in Indonesia and Thailand.

== The attempted bombing ==
On January 19, 1991, two men, Ahmed J. Ahmed and Sa'ad Kahim, parked a Japanese-model car outside the cultural center. Ahmed then carried a large canvas bag containing a PETN explosive device towards the building and began setting its timer. However, working by the illumination of a lighter, he mistakenly wound the timer backward instead of forward, detonating the bomb prematurely. Ahmed was killed immediately by the blast. Kahim wandered dazed and covered in his colleague's entrails through the street until a cab driver noticed him and brought him to Makati Medical Center.

The DSS sent Agent Evanoff to the hospital to follow up on reports a Middle-Eastern man had been driven there following the blast, and he was handed a slip of paper by the wounded Kahim who seemed to fail to realise he was an investigating officer; the paper contained the telephone number for the Iraqi embassy.

== Responsibility ==
Later investigation revealed that they had cased the library a week earlier, and had been met by a suspicious security guard, but DSS agent Brenden O'Hanlen instructed security to let them pass after photocopying their Jordanian passports and Palestinian identity cards.

Iraqi Consul General Muwafak al-Ani was expelled from the Philippines after his card was found in Kahim's pocket. Al-Ani would later becomes Iraq's ambassador to the People's Republic of China; he would gain notoriety again in 2003 after he barricaded himself in the Iraqi embassy in Beijing for 55 days after the invasion of Iraq.

Kahim was later released part of a prisoner exchange in which Iraq agreed to release contracted Filipino workers for his repatriation.
