= Emma Henry =

Filipino police officer

Emma S. Henry (late 1940s (Note: Based on newspaper accounts, Henry's age at the time of death was either 38 (birth year may be 1947/1948) or 39 (1946/1947); Therefore, her birth occurred between 1946 and 1948.) – April 17, 1986) was a Filipino–American police officer whose exploits were the subject of two Filipino film biopics wherein she starred as herself.

== Profile ==
Born in the late 1940s, Emma had a father who is from San Francisco, United States, wherein she claimed having relatives in the area's police force.

She was an education graduate; from 1968 to 1971, she took up a master's course in martial arts in Tokyo. Even prior to becoming a police officer, she was proficient in judo and karate, sports not commonly associated with Filipino women at that time. Henry was a high-ranking sikaran black belter, and used to be an Asian karate champion. She reportedly worked once as a radio announcer. (Note: It is uncertain if Emma Henry, the police officer, is the same (as a radio personality) mentioned in a 1961 report from a source which, while stating that Emma Henry is a Filipino-American from Laguna, stated also conflicting accounts: She was 18 years old by then (making 1942/1943 as her birth year); a former pre-medical student who planned to pursue medical studies abroad.)

Henry was arguably the first prominent female law enforcement officer in the Philippines. Reportedly became interested in police work, she joined the 33-man police force of Los Baños, Laguna in 1972. Being a patrolwoman and police lieutenant, she was cited for five instances of capturing criminals singlehandedly, mainly with application of skill in martial arts. These acts led her to receive a citation in 1973 as one of the Ten Outstanding Police Officers of the Philippines. She won local and foreign awards for her skill in martial arts, as well as medals in her 14-year career. She eventually became the country's first and, by the time of her death, only female police station commander.

Her exploits were the subject of two movies, both portrayed by herself, that depicted her as a heroine. Henry gained further fame after she agreed to play herself in a biopic on her life produced by Kinavesa Productions. Released in 1978, Emma Henry (Policewoman) showcased Henry's martial arts skills and was a success. A sequel, Ang Pagbabalik ni Emma Henry ("The Return of Emma Henry"), followed three years later. Henry starred in another film, Lady Cop.

Despite her modest film career, Henry continued her day job as a police officer. Henry was the police chief of Cabuyao, Laguna when she was killed while in the line of duty. On April 17, 1986, she was shot in her car by four suspected New People's Army rebels who had stopped her while on the way to work, and later escaped aboard a van. NPA was then waging a high-profile campaign to liquidate well-known police officials. The motive was unknown.
