= Philippines Development Assistance Program =

The Philippine Development Assistance Programme, Inc. (PDAP) is a coalition of Filipino and Canadian non-government organizations (NGOs). It was founded in 1986 as a non-profit organization to alleviate poverty and inequality in the Philippines. PDAP partners with existing NGOs in the Philippines as well as peoples’ organizations (POs) to develop and carry out projects to help the rural communities. The main form of funding for PDAP's projects is contributions from the Canadian International Development Agency (CIDA).

== Programs ==
=== Central Loan Fund ===
The Central Loan Fund was launched in late 1993 by PDAP to provide credit facilities to the poor communities. The success of the CLF led to the formation of the Federation of Peoples’ Sustainable Development Cooperative (FPSDC), which was set up in 1998.

=== Promoting Participation in Sustainable Enterprises ===
Promoting Participation in Sustainable Enterprises conducted from 1997 to 2004, was based on the model of Sustainable Agriculture, and aimed to promote subsistence farming and help transform micro-enterprises into larger and more efficient sustainable enterprises. Through this program, PDAP realised the importance of linkages between the rural communities and the market, and provided marketing support to the enterprises.

=== Promoting Rural Industries and Market Enhancement Program ===
Promoting Rural Industries and Market Enhancement Program aims to encourage the participation of the rural communities in enterprises that will help to improve food security, increase income and create jobs for the rural poor. This five-year program, from 2005 to 2010, builds on the achievements of the PPSE program and hopes to achieve its objective through four components: development of micro-enterprises, enhancing market participation, policy analysis and strengthening PDAP's institutional capacity.

== Challenges facing PDAP ==
PDAP used to have a large organic rice farming program in Valencia, Bukidnon in the Philippines but it was subsequently scaled down significantly. Beethoven Morales (2004) explained that it was a challenge for most NGOs in Bukidnon to establish sufficient income-generating activities that will allow them to be self-sustaining. Due to the increasing competition for foreign assistance, and local governments having numerous financial challenges, many NGOs are having problems maintaining their operations in Bukidnon as their sources of finance become restricted.

Consuelo Katrina A. Lopa (2003) highlighted that the NGOs and their beneficiaries will be greatly affected by foreign policy changes if the NGOs only depend on a single donor for contributions. As a result of the need to increase the sources of income, PDAP is also funding its projects through contributions from Canadian NGOs and Official Development Assistance (ODA).
