= Murder of Eldon Maguan =

1991 murder case in San Juan, Metro Manila

- Location: Little Baguio, San Juan, Metro Manila, Philippines
- Date: July 2, 1991 (PhST (UTC+08:00))
- Attack type: Murder
- Weapon: 9 mm caliber pistol
- Deaths: 1 civilian
- Victim: Eldon Maguan
- Perpetrator: Rolito Go
- Motive: Road rage
- Verdict: Guilty
- Convictions: Reclusión perpetua (40 years in prison)

Rolito Go
- Born: Rolito Tambunting y Go
- Occupation: Business magnate

On July 2, 1991, Eldon Maguan, a 25-year-old engineering student at De La Salle University, was fatally shot by Rolito Go, a 43-year-old construction magnate in what authorities described as a road rage incident along Wilson Street in San Juan, Metro Manila, Philippines.

Maguan sustained a gunshot wound to the head and died several days later. The case drew national attention because of Go's social standing, his escape from custody prior to sentencing, and subsequent controversies surrounding his incarceration and release. In 1997, Go was convicted of murder by the Pasig Regional Trial Court and sentenced to reclusión perpetua. After serving part of his sentence and receiving sentence reductions for good conduct, he was released in 2016 following a ruling by the Supreme Court of the Philippines.

== Shooting ==
On the evening of July 2, 1991, Maguan was driving his car along the one-way section of Wilson Street towards Pedro Guevarra Street in Barangay Little Baguio in San Juan, when Go — who had earlier been at the Cravings Bakeshop & Restaurant — drove against traffic on the same road. The two vehicles nearly collided at the intersection of Wilson Street and Jose Abad Santos Street.

According to court records, Go exited his car, approached Maguan's car, and fired a single shot into Maguan's head while the latter remained inside his vehicle. Go then fled the scene by car.

== Investigation ==
Shortly after the incident, San Juan police recovered an empty shell casing and a live 9 mm caliber round at the scene. Investigators identified the suspect through eyewitness accounts and documentary evidence obtained from nearby establishments.

A security guard at Alex III, a restaurant near the intersection, recorded Go's vehicle registration plate, while staff at Cravings provided a facsimile of a credit card used by Go prior to the incident. Records from the Land Transportation Office later confirmed that the vehicle involved was registered to Go's wife, Elsa Ang Go.

== Arrest and trial ==
Rolito Go

A manhunt was launched following the shooting. On July 8, 1991, six days after the incident, Go surrendered to the San Juan police accompanied by two lawyers. He was identified by an eyewitness at the police station and placed under detention.

On the same day, police filed a complaint for frustrated homicide with the Office of the Provincial Prosecutor of Rizal. Go was informed by First Assistant provincial prosecutor Dennis Villa Ignacio, in the presence of his lawyers, that he could sign a waiver to allow a preliminary investigation pursuant to Article 125 of the Revised Penal Code. Neither Go nor his lawyers executed the waiver.

Maguan died of his gunshot wounds on July 9, 1991. As a result, on July 11, 1991, prosecutors elevated the charge to murder before the Pasig Regional Trial Court, with no recommendation for bail.

Go was detained at the Rizal Provincial Jail beginning August 23, 1991, and trial proceedings commenced on September 19, 1991. On November 1, 1993, at the end of his trial, Go escaped from custody at the Rizal Provincial Jail He was later convicted in absentia and, on November 5, 1997, sentenced to reclusión perpetua, equivalent to 40 years' imprisonment.

Members of the Maguan family alleged that Go had bribed the jail guards to facilitate his escape; several guards as a result were subsequently dismissed from service. On April 30, 1996, Go was rearrested at a piggery in Pampanga. Authorities reported that Go attempted to bribe the arresting officers, who refused the offer.

== Incarceration ==
In 1999, Go petitioned the Supreme Court to reverse or modify the Pasig Regional Trial Court's decision, which had then been affirmed by the Court of Appeals. The Supreme Court ruled with finality against the petition on January 10, 2000. Afterwards, Go was transferred to the maximum security compound of the New Bilibid Prison (NBP) in Muntinlupa, Metro Manila.

In October 2008, then-Department of Justice secretary Raul M. Gonzalez said Go was eligible for a presidential pardon after serving half of his prison sentence. In 2009, Go was transferred to the minimum security compound and granted live-out privileges by the Bureau of Corrections under BuCor director Oscar Calderon.

Go applied for parole on multiple occasions, but these were denied by the Supreme Court and opposed by Maguan's family, who also urged then-Philippine president Gloria Macapagal Arroyo not to extend any pardon to Go. While housed in the minimum security compound, Go worked at the Ina ng Awa church within the New Bilibid Prison grounds.

=== 2011 New Bilibid Prison furlough controversy ===
In May 2011, the Department of Justice opened an inquiry on an unauthorized prison furlough incident in which former Batangas governor Antonio Leviste was allowed to leave his confinement at the New Bilibid Prison for a supposed dental appointment.

During the investigation, it was revealed by a senior BuCor official that Go would frequently go in and out of the NBP to visit the office of his lending company in the nearby Soldiers' Hills Village in Muntinlupa, leaving the NBP at noon and returning a few hours later. As a result of the controversy, BuCor director Ernesto Diokno went on administrative leave and shortly resigned after.

=== Alleged kidnapping ===
At 11:30 pm on August 14, 2012, Go was reported as missing when he did not appear during a head count at the New Bilibid Prison. His last known reported whereabouts was at the Ina ng Awa church, where his nephew, Clemence Yu, was nursing his wounds. The following day, after Yu did not return home, Go's family informed Department of Justice secretary Leila de Lima that they were able to reach Go and Yu by phone, who informed them that they had been kidnapped for a ransom of ₱1 million (US$20,304.57).

As a result, administrative cases were filed against the NBP's minimum security prison warden and a prison guard who was assigned as Go's custodian. The two officers were ordered dismissed by NBP superintendent Richard Schwarskopf Jr. An investigation was launched by the Philippine National Police's Criminal Investigation and Detection Group and the National Bureau of Investigation. A hold departure order was also issued by Bureau of Immigration commissioner Ricardo David, instructing all airports and seaports to be on the lookout for Go. A Senate probe was also sought by senator Gregorio Honasan to investigate whether the additional legislation is needed to protect inmates from kidnapping incidents.

The Maguan family was in disbelief over the kidnapping incident, as Eldon Maguan's older brother, Ellis Maguan, stated that Go was a "bigtime government contractor and wealthy businessman" prior to the murder incident in 1991. Ellis also questioned the Go family's kidnapping alibi as being orchestrated between the family and the abductors. A day later, Go and Yu were found and taken into custody by the PNP Anti-Kidnapping Group in Alabang, Muntinlupa after intercepting them on a bus.

In a press conference, NBP chief superintendent Generoso Cerbo Jr. stated that Go told the police that he and Yu were released by their alleged kidnappers based in Tanauan, Batangas. Go's family claimed that no ransom was paid in exchange for the release of the two.

=== 2014 release order ===
In 2014, the Muntinlupa Regional Trial Court granted Go's petition to be released from prison, who argued that he had already fully served his sentence based on an adjusted computation of his prison term. However, De Lima directed that Go would not be released following her directive to the Office of the Solicitor General to file a motion for reconsideration to appeal the court order.

De Lima maintained that Go has not yet completed his prison term based on the computation of the BuCor, while Go claims he had already been granted "colonist status", making him eligible for good conduct time allowance credits to reduce his prison sentence.

== Release ==
On November 28, 2016, after 25 years in prison, the Supreme Court ruled its decision to release Rolito Go from prison based on his transfer to the Iwahig Prison and Penal Farm and good conduct which had commuted his sentence to 30 years. The Maguans' lawyer, attorney Jose Flaminiano, stated on December 17, 2016 that the Maguan family will no longer take legal action to petition the Supreme Court's ruling.

At the time of his release, Go was hospitalized at the Metropolitan Medical Center in Santa Cruz, Manila for stage 4 colorectal cancer.

In 2019, during the good conduct time allowance controversy, the Quezon City Police District sought to rearrest Go after his name was included in a list of "heinous crime convicts for re-arrest" ordered by then-President Rodrigo Duterte. However, in the list, Go was convicted of rape instead of murder. The move was later rescinded after Justice secretary Menardo Guevarra clarified that Go had fully served his sentence and was not among those prematurely released.
