= Fhrancis Lopez =

- Born: Fhrancis Oliver Lopez; February 3, 1989 (age 37); Las Piñas, Philippines
- Other name: Francis Lopez
- Occupations: Model; endorser
- Height: 5 ft 8 in (1.73 m)
- Children: 1
- Beauty pageant titleholder
- Title: Mister Philippines 2011
- Agency: Go Green Artists, Project Management
- Years active: 2011–present
- Hair color: Black
- Eye color: Black
- Major competitions: Mister Philippines 2011(Winner); Mister International 2011 (Top 16)
- Website: http://misterofthephilippines.com/

Fhrancis Oliver Lopez (born February 3, 1989), is a Filipino model, endorser and beauty pageant titleholder known for being the winner of the Mister Philippines 2011 pageant. She represented the Philippines at the Mister International 2011 pageant and finished in the Top 16.

== Biography ==
Lopez was born and raised in the southern tip of Metro Manila. Before he joined the pageant of Mister Philippines, Fhrancis worked as a model. Fhrancis and his agency signed a contract with the Go Green Artists and the Project Management. After he won and got the prize, Fhrancis held a pageant in Patravadi Theatre. Lopez is one of the Top 16 finalists in Mister International 2011.

== Pageantry ==
=== Mister Philippines 2011 & Mister International 2011 ===
Lopez was declared as one of the winners of Mister Philippines 2011. After he won the competition on December 17, 2011, Lopez joined to compete in the Mister International 2011 pageant in Pattaya, Thailand and Bangkok.

== See also ==
- JM de Guzman
- Mister International 2011
- Mister Philippines 2011
- Neil Perez

Awards and achievements
Preceded by Raphael Cruz Carlos	Mister International Philippines; 2011	Succeeded by Mark John Gutoman
