= Antonio Tantay =

Filipino basketball player

Antonio Tantay (February 5, 1920 – July 27, 1988 in Quezon City) was a Filipino basketball player who competed in the 1952 Summer Olympics.

He enrolled at FEATI University and then transferred to Far Eastern University in 1947 where he was one of the mainstays of the Tamaraws when FEU and UST emerge co-champions in the UAAP that same year. The year 1947 was fruitful for Tantay. He helped power the Olympic Sporting Goods in winning the MICAA championship and was named both in the UAAP and MICAA selection.

The following year, Tantay was recruited by Skip Guinto for the Philippine Ports Terminal in the MICAA tournament wherein the Terminal clinched the championship. Tantay was named candidate for the 1948 London Olympics but politics intervened and was only made alternate with Crispin Aldiosa. After two years with the Terminal, he joined Interwood in 1950 and in 1951, joined the Philippine Air Lines, now coached by Guinto. PAL lost to the Carlos Loyzaga-led San Beda Red Lions in the National Open and the PAL-San Beda duel sharpen Tantay's defensive skills and helped him make the 1952 Olympics in Helsinki. Tantay retired from active competition in 1954.
