= List of Ngayon at Kailanman (2018 TV series) characters =

Ngayon at Kailanman (International title: Now and Forever) is a 2018 Philippine drama television series starring Julia Barretto and Joshua Garcia. The series premiered on ABS-CBN's Primetime Bida evening block and worldwide via The Filipino Channel from August 20, 2018 to January 18, 2019, replacing Bagani.

== Overview ==
Actor	Character	Appearances	
Actor	Character	1	
Actor	Character	1	2
Main
Julia Barretto	Angela M. Cortes / Eva Mapendo	Main	Main
Joshua Garcia	Innocencio "Inno" S. Cortes	Main	Main
Iza Calzado	Rebecca Marquez-Young	Main	Main
Alice Dixson	Stella Simbajon-Cortes	Main	Main
Ina Raymundo	Adessa Mapendo	Main	Main
Dominic Ochoa	Abel Dimaguiba	Main	Main
Christian Vasquez	Hernan A. Cortes	Main	Main
Jameson Blake	Oliver "Oli" S. Cortes	Main	Main
Elisse Joson	Christina Mapendo / Roxanne Constantino		Main
Joao Constancia	Dominic "Dom" Consuelo	Main	Main
Rio Locsin	Rosa Mapendo	Main	Main
Rosemarie Gil	Carmen Alipio Cortes	Main	Main

== Main ==
- Joshua Garcia as Innocencio "Inno" S. Cortes†: Hernan's youngest son and Stella’s stepson. All through his childhood until he became an adult, he was constantly picked on by his stepmother. Inno is Hernan's son with another woman, which is why Stella does not love him. As a result, he is anti-social and quiet. As a child, Inno donates his bone marrow to save his older brother Ollie, whom he has a close relationship with. Years later, he meets Eva and they become romantically involved. Their first conflict arises because Ollie is also in love with Eva. As an adult, Inno is a perfectionist, disciplined, and principled with no room for errors, constantly hoping to get his mother's approval. Eva changes his perspective on life. Their relationship creates a conflict within his family: his mother and grandmother look down on Eva, he and his brother fight over Eva, and Stella wants to get rid of her when she discovers Eva's true identity. In the end, he dies with Eva by Oliver's hand while trying to rescue her.
- Julia Barretto as Eva Mapendo† / Angela M. Cortes†: Eva has no recollection of her past. She does not know that she is Rodrigo Cortes’ missing daughter and legal heiress of the Cortez fortune after her father's death. Barely a few weeks old, the infant Angela is taken by the assassin Joey from her dying mother. Joey feels sorry for the newborn and brings the infant to his childless wife, Mia. They keep her hidden and name her Eva. Ten years later, the assassins are discovered and killed, but Eva escapes, her boat adrift in the open seas, then later rescued and adopted by Rosa Mapendo and her family. The trauma of her ordeal leaves her with no memories of her previous life, just her name. She grows up street-smart and dreams of giving her family a better life. She crosses paths with Inno, whom she falls in love with. He helps her regain her memories but the truth creates a conflict for their relationship. In the end, she was killed with Inno by Oliver after abducting her.
- Iza Calzado as Rebecca Marquez-Young: Angela's biological mother. She falls in love with Rodrigo Cortes, Julian's only child and heir of the Cortes fortune and family prized jewel the Nostalgia. Disapproving of their relationship, Don Julian disowns Rodrigo and he becomes estranged from his family. Rodrigo lives a simple, happy life in the province with Rebecca and their infant daughter, Angela. Their peaceful lives end abruptly upon his father's death. Rodrigo returns to attend the funeral and learns that in his will, his father leaves everything to him as sole heir. Rodrigo is murdered and in the absence of heirs, where his infant daughter is presumed dead, the Cortes empire is turned over to his stepbrother Hernan. Rebecca survives the assassination and returns two decades later as Rodrigo's former fiancé, out to get to the truth about her fiancé's death and the daughter's disappearance. She is Hernan's neighbor in Quezon and becomes business partners with Stella, hoping to uncover the truth about Rodrigo and Angela's deaths. She does not deny her identity, but secretly pursues her investigation. Upon learning the truth she plans their destruction. Complications arise when Inno and Eva fall in love. Her hatred towards the Cortes family drives a wedge between mother and daughter when she is determined to separate Inno. After Eva's death, she learns to forgive.
- Alice Dixson as Stella Simbajon-Cortez: Hernan’s wife, and daughter-in-law of Julian and Carmen Cortes. She belongs to a political family and marries into the wealthy patrician Cortes family. Her husband is Don Julian's stepson and Doña Carmen Cortes’ son from a previous marriage. Stella favors her first-born son, Ollie, over her youngest son, Inno, as he is Hernan's child with another woman. Stella is the mastermind behind the assassination of Rodrigo and Rebecca so that her husband, Hernan, as the closest remaining relative acquires the wealth of the Cortes family. They lose it a decade later when Rebecca returns and proves that Eva is Rodrigo's daughter. Stella is arraigned and jailed when Rebecca proves that Stella manipulated the DNA results to match the imposter Roxanne.
- Ina Raymundo as Adessa Mapendo: Rosa's younger sister and Eva's adoptive mother. Adessa suffers a severe mental breakdown when her infant child is abducted, but the arrival of Eva leads her back to sanity. She serves as Eva's adoptive mother and later reunites with her missing daughter Christina.
- Dominic Ochoa as Abel Dimaguiba: Eva's father figure who cares for and marries Adessa. He searches for clues on Adessa's missing child and finds her.
- Christian Vasquez as Hernan Cortes†: Doña Carmen's son from another man before marrying Julian. He is Don Julian's stepson and allows him to carry the Cortes name, but is not included in his step father's will. He is a kind and humble man, looking for a simple life. Hernan loves both his sons Inno and wants Ollie to look up to Inno as a role model and follow his actions. Hernan accidentally stabs Rodrigo after an argument with him and his mother Carmen over the Will but he doesn't kill him. His conscience is getting the best of him, and finally reveals the truth to Rebecca but is killed by Stella's assassins when he tries to protect her.
- Jameson Blake as Oliver "Ollie" S. Cortes: Inno's older half brother, favored by his mother, Stella. As a child, he is sickly and almost dies but is saved by his brother Inno's bone marrow donation. He is kind hearted and loves his brother very much, but he turns against Inno when Eva chooses Inno. He is manipulated by his mother to believe that both Inno and Eva are to blame for their family's misfortune and deaths. He suffers mental disorder. He shoots and kills them both and ends up in a mental hospital.
- Elisse Joson as Roxanne Constantino / Christina Mapendo: A girl who was paid by Stella to impersonate Angela Cortes. Later on, her testimony helps Rebecca puts Stella in jail. Roxanne turns out to be Christina Mapendo, Adessa's long lost daughter. She was stolen from her mother by Daniel Constantino, her biological father, after Rosa prohibited their relationship. He left the infant with his father who raised the child as Roxanne. Daniel never returns.
- Joao Constancia as Dominic "Dom" Consuelo: Eva's best friend, a policeman. He helps Eva and is secretly in love with her. He is very protective of Eva and dislikes Inno and Oliver.
- Rio Locsin as Rosa Mapendo: A fisherwoman who finds Eva stranded on a fishboat. She is a kindhearted woman, who adopts Eva and raises her as her own. She has a younger sister named Adessa. She later works as a maid in the Cortes household, and learns first hand about Stella's malevolence. She is ready to stand-up to Stella.
- Rosemarie Gil as Doña Carmen Cortes: The matriarch of the Cortes family, widow of the late Don Julian Cortez, billionaire and founder of the Cortez empire. Hernan is her natural son from a previous marriage. When she marries Julian, she becomes Rodrigo's stepmother. Rodrigo and his daughter Angela are the true blood heirs of the Cortes empire. In his will, Don Julian leaves everything to Rodrigo. She is dismayed when she learns that she and her son Hernan were left with nothing. Confused at the turn of events, Rodrigo discovers a letter written by his father to him, to which he confronts his step mother: his father warns him of his suspicions that Doña Carmen killed Rodrigo's mother so she could marry him. Rodrigo confronts his stepmother and a heated argument ensues. As Herman tries to defend his mother, the two brothers have a violent fight and Hernan accidentally stabs him. She pulls the distraught Hernan away and they flee the scene. Stella returns to finish her brother in law and stabs him with a pitchfork. Doña Carmen is very protective of her crown jewel, Nostalgia. She is closest to her youngest grandson, Inno, who takes over the Cortes organization after Hernan resigns from the position. She is reduced to impoverished circumstances when the court rules for Eva and declares Eva as the sole legal beneficiary of the Cortes wealth. Although she rejected Eva for Inno, she changes her attitude in the end and encourages Inno to follow his heart. Rebecca returns the Nostalgia to her at the end.
