= Boom Labrusca =

Filipino actor

- Born: Anthony Labrusca; December 2, 1976 (age 49); Manila, Philippines
- Other names: Miguel dela Rosa, Boom Antonio
- Occupation: Actor
- Years active: 1986–present
- Spouse: Desiree del Valle (m. 2018)
- Children: (2, including Tony)

Anthony "Boom" Labrusca (Tagalog pronunciation: [lɐˈbɾʊska]; born December 2, 1976) is a Filipino character actor and model.

== Recent career ==
In October 2010, he started at hosting Usapang Lalake on Studio 23 with Aran Sese, Jobert Austria and Alex Calleja.

== Personal life ==
Labrusca has a son with ex-girlfriend Angel Jones, a member of 1990s hip hop group Kulay, named Anthony "Tony" Labrusca Jr. (born 1995), who auditioned in Pinoy Boyband Superstar. Tony grew up in Canada with his mother and his stepfather, Boom Dayupay.

Labrusca is married to his Flordeliza co-star Desiree del Valle since January 2018. Del Valle confirmed their engagement on July 14, 2015.

Labrusca is a Catholic. He and del Valle have a son.

== Filmography ==
=== Film ===
Year	Title	Role	Notes	Ref.
1998	Labs Kita, Okey ka lang?	Alvin	Credited as "Miguel dela Rosa"	
1998	Magandang Hatinggabi	Darwin's friend	Segment: "Kuba"	
1998	Hiling	Jun-Jun		
1998	Soltera	Edwin		
1999	Oo Na... Mahal Na Kung Mahal	Enad's brother	Credited as "Miguel dela Rosa"	
2005	Gigil	Don	Credited as "Boom Antonio"	
2006	Shake, Rattle & Roll 8	Julio	Segment: "Yaya"	
2012	Unofficially Yours	Ipe		
2013	Bromance: My Brother's Romance	Arn-Arn		
2014	The Amazing Praybeyt Benjamin	Boomburoomboom		
2015	Honor Thy Father	Erwin		
2020	Four Sisters Before the Wedding	Edwin		

=== Television ===
Year	Title	Role	Notes	Ref.
1986	That's Entertainment	Himself	Credited as "Anthony Labrusca"	
1996	Gimik	Migs	Credited as "Miguel dela Rosa"	
1998	Esperanza	Jason	Credited as "Miguel dela Rosa"	
1999	G-mik	Paks	Credited as "Miguel dela Rosa"	
2005	Txt Tube	Himself — Host	Credited as "Miguel 'Boom' Labrusca"	
2008	Codename: Asero	Sonic		
2009	Ang Babaeng Hinugot Sa Aking Tadyang	Greg		
2009	Sine Novela: Ngayon at Kailanman	William Merador		
2009	Nagsimula sa Puso	Oliver		
2010	Wansapanataym	Vener Vernal	Episode: "Cara"	
2010–2012	Usapang Lalake	Himself — Host		
2011	Your Song Presents: Kim	Dave	Episode: "Pagkat Mahal Kita"	
2011	Guns and Roses	Franco Moreno		
2011	Maalaala Mo Kaya	Romy	Episode: "Passbook"	
2011–2012	Maria La Del Barrio	Edwin Marasigan		
2012	E-Boy	Young Tatang		
2012	Aryana	Tilapio		
2012	Precious Hearts Romances Presents: Pintada	Quintin		
2013	Wansapanataym	Sining	Episode: "Teacher's Pest"	
2013	My Little Juan	Bobby		
2013–2014	Jim Fernandez's Galema, Anak Ni Zuma	Louie Villalobos		
2013–2015	Banana Split	Himself		
2014	Goin' Bulilit Presents: The Prodigal Son	Luke's dad	Lenten Special	
2014	Maalaala Mo Kaya	Jojo	Episode: "Pedicab"	
2015	Flordeliza	Luis Jacinto		
2015	Kapamilya, Deal or No Deal	Briefcase Number 8	Contestant/Lucky Stars did not play for an episode of Batch 4	
2015	Ipaglaban Mo!	Buboy	Episode: "Pusong Mapanlinlang"	
2016	FPJ's Ang Probinsyano	Waldo		
2016	Wansapanataym	Fairy Father	Episode: "Susi Ni Sisay"	
2016	Dolce Amore	Roger		
2016	Pinoy Boyband Superstar	Himself	Episode 7	
2017	Wansapanataym	Warehouse owner of Paint Company	Episode: "Annika Pintasera"	
2017	La Luna Sangre	Victor Meneses		
2018	Sana Dalawa ang Puso	Marlon Fernandez		
2018	Ipaglaban Mo!	Mr. Lee, NBI Agent	Episode: "Set Up"	
2019	Maalaala Mo Kaya	Coach Dolo	Episode: "MVP"	
2019	Ipaglaban Mo!	Paul Bryan Reyes	Episode: "Samantala"	
2019–2020	Pamilya Ko	Sofronio Dela Paz		
2020	A Soldier's Heart			
2020	Tadhana	Raymart	Episode: "Swap"	
2021	Init sa Magdamag	Lav Del Mundo		
2021	Magpakailanman	Rolando	Episode: "Nanay Kontesera"	
2022	Dear God	Danny		
2022	Tadhana	Johnny	Episode: "Akin ang Bukas"	
2022–2023	Mars Ravelo's Darna	Pablo Guzman / Silent Shocker		
2023	Luv is: Caught in His Arms	Dencio		
2023	Tadhana	Enrico	Episode: "Tahanan"	
2025	Lolong: Bayani ng Bayan	Police Capt. Jose Dela Vega		
2025	Pepito Manaloto: Tuloy Ang Kwento	Elmer's Daddy	Episode: "Clarissa Goes to College"	
2025	Magpakailanman	Melvin	Episode: "Double Murder sa Pamilya: The Dindo Sumibcay Story"	
2025	Maka Lovestream	Doc Joel	Episode: "Manifestations 4"	
2026	A Secret in Prague	Brusko		
