= Tony Labrusca =

Philippines-based actor, model, and singer (born 1995)

- Born: Anthony Angel Labrusca Jr. (Note: Tony Labrusca was born in the United States of America. Thus, he does not possess his mother's maiden name which is Jones.); August 7, 1995 (age 31); Houston, Texas, U.S.
- Citizenship: United States
- Occupations: Model; actor; singer
- Years active: 2016–present
- Agent: Star Magic (2016–present)
- Height: 1.80 m (5 ft 11 in)
- Parents: Boom Labrusca; (father); Angel Jones; (biological mother); Desiree del Valle; (stepmother)
- Website: anthonylabrusca.com

Anthony Angel Labrusca Jr. (Tagalog pronunciation: [lɐˈbɾʊska]; born August 7, 1995) is an American actor, model, and singer based in the Philippines. Labrusca first gained his popularity via a McDonald's Philippines TV ad in 2016, Tuloy Pa Rin.

In 2016, he joined the Philippine reality search Pinoy Boyband Superstar, but did not make the cut to be part of the band. He was thenpart of a horror-fantasy drama series called La Luna Sangre. The trailer of his latest film Glorious reached more than 5 million views on its first day of release.

== Early life ==
Anthony Angel Labrusca Jr. was born on August 7, 1995, in Houston, Texas, in the United States. He is the son of Filipino actor Boom Labrusca and Filipina singer Angel Jones. He grew up in Los Angeles, California with his mother, stepfather Boom Dayupay, and sister. When he was nine, his family moved to Vancouver, British Columbia, Canada. He later flew to the Philippines to pursue his career in show business.

== Career ==
Before Labrusca auditioned for Pinoy Boyband Superstar, he was already a face of various TV commercials. He became more popular when he played the guy who broke a girl's heart (Elisse Joson) in the viral McDonald's TV ad entitled Tuloy Pa Rin in 2016.

During his audition in Pinoy Boyband Superstar, he was unexpectedly reunited with his biological father Boom Labrusca. He successfully became one of the top contenders and went up to the Top 7 for the grand finals. He did not make it to the Top 5 as the final member of BoybandPH.

He made his acting debut in 2017 via TV5's Wattpad Presents with Louise delos Reyes. Later, he joined La Luna Sangre, which is considered as his first break playing the role of Jake Arguelles.

In June 2020, Labrusca starred in the hit Filipino BL series, Hello Stranger. The series proved popular even among international fans, which led to the Hello Stranger film in 2021.

From 2023 to 2024, he played the main antagonist, Lucas Buencamino, in Nag-aapoy na Damdamin.

In February 2025, Labrusca's Star Magic contract permitted him to star in a GMA series titled Binibining Marikit, with Herlene Budol.

Labrusca portrayed the titular character in the 2025 film Dreamboi. This is his first role in an erotic film.

== Personal life ==
Labrusca is a United States citizen and a U.S. passport holder. He is unmarried.

On January 3, 2019, shortly after landing at Ninoy Aquino International Airport (NAIA), Labrusca allegedly yelled profanities at Bureau of Immigration officers after they stamped his passport for a 30-day stay – the country’s maximum visa-free period for United States passport holders. Labrusca was using his American passport and had no work visa, but mistakenly believed he was covered by the Balikbayan Program one-year visa-free stay. A spokesperson for the Bureau of Immigration explained the Balikbayan Program "is for former Filipinos and their immediate family members who are traveling with them. If these family members are not traveling with them, then they are not qualified." Labrusca was not accompanied by an immediate family member at that time. He was widely criticized for the incident, and Foreign Affairs Secretary Teodoro Locsin Jr. suggested his deportation. The following day, Labrusca apologized to immigration officials and admitted he did not know the full details of the Balikbayan Program, but maintained that he did not curse or shout at any officer.

In June 2021, Labrusca was charged with alleged acts of lasciviousness and slight physical injuries related to an incident five months prior on the night of January 16, 2021. A drunk Labrusca allegedly unstrapped a woman's top to expose her breasts before forcefully pulling her to sit on his lap, and he also allegedly choked a man that same night. In July, the physical injuries case was dismissed by the Makati prosecutor's office since the complaint was filed "more than two months from the date of its alleged commission, the crime is already extinguished by reason of prescription." In March 2022, the acts of lasciviousness case was dismissed citing no probable cause.

== Filmography ==
=== Television / Digital series ===
Year	Title	Role
2016–2024; 2026–present	ASAP XP	Himself / Performer
2016–2017	Pinoy Boyband Superstar	Himself
2017	Wattpad Presents: I'm Making Out with the Payboy at School	Damon Lawrence
2017–2018	La Luna Sangre	Jake Arguelles
2019	Sino ang May Sala?	Andrei Joseph "Drei" Montelibano
2019	Ipaglaban Mo: Saltik	Jerome
2019	Ang Babae sa Septic Tank 3: The Real Untold Story of Josephine Bracken	José Rizal
2020	24/7	Xavier Agbayani
2020	I Am U	Kyle
2020–2021	Bagong Umaga	Raphael "Ely" Florentino / Raphael "Ely" Ponce
2021	Click, Like, Share: Altered	Homer
2023–2024	Nag-aapoy na Damdamin	Lucas Buencamino
2025	Binibining Marikit	Andrew "Drew" Jimenez
2026	The Good Doctor	

=== Digital series ===
Year	Title	Role
2020	Hello Stranger	Xavier De Guzman

=== Film ===
Year	Title	Role
2017	Loving in Tandem	Vince
2018	Glorious	Niko
2018	ML	Carlo
2018	Double Twisting Double Back	Bradley
2019	The Mall, The Merrier	Gardo
2019	Ang Henerasyong Sumuko Sa Love	Kurt Adam Agapito
2020	U-Turn	Robin
2020	Love Lockdown	Darren
2020	Hindi Tayo Pwede	Gabriel F. Del Rosario
2021	Hello, Stranger: The Movie	Xavier De Guzman
2025	Dreamboi	Dreamboi
2026	All About Her	

== Awards and nominations ==
Year	Film awards/critics	Award	Nominated work	Result
2017	PMPC Star Awards for TV	Best New Male TV Personality	La Luna Sangre	Won
2018	MOR Pinoy Music Awards	MOR Best New Artist	Tanging Ikaw	Nominated
2018	Cinema One Originals Film Festival	Best Actor	Double Twisting Double Back	Nominated
2018	LionhearTV RAWR Awards	Breakthrough Artist of the Year		Won

== See also ==
- Pinoy Boyband Superstar
