= BoybandPH =

Filipino boy band

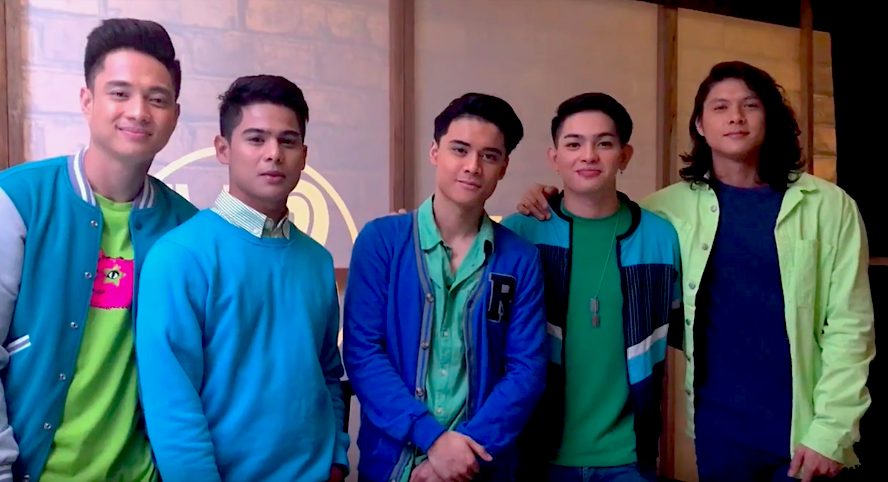
- BoybandPH in 2018 (from left to right: Ford Valencia, Niel Murillo, Russell Reyes, Joao Constancia, Tristan Ramirez)

Background information
- Origin: Manila, Philippines
- Genres: P-pop; teen pop; bubblegum pop; Reggaeton; Bachata
- Years active: 2016–2020
- Label: Star Music (2016–2020)
- Past members: Joao Constancia; Niel Murillo; Tristan Ramirez; Russell Reyes; Ford Valencia
- Website: Archived official website at the Wayback Machine (archived 2018-11-04)

BoybandPH (also known as BPH) is a Filipino boy band formed on December 11 2016, after winning ABS-CBN's reality show Pinoy Boyband Superstar, a franchise of Simon Cowell's singing competition La Banda. The group consists of Niel Murillo, Russell Reyes, Ford Valencia, Tristan Ramirez, and Joao Constancia.

After winning Pinoy Boyband Superstar, BoybandPH released their debut single, "Unli", on January 1, 2017. This was followed by a second single, a cover of Depeche Mode's ""Somebody"" on February 14, 2017. The group launched their self-titled debut album on February 4, 2017, under Star Music. On April 2, 2017, BoybandPH received the Gold Record Award, after their album sold over 7,500 copies in less than two months.

The group is managed by and has a recording contract with Star Music. Currently inactive, the members are pursuing individual projects. Joao pursued acting while Ford released a solo single in 2021.

== History ==
=== 2016: Pinoy Boyband Superstar and formation ===
In 2016, ABS-CBN announced an upcoming reality show that would feature the formation of a Pinoy Boyband, based on the television reality singing competition created by Simon Cowell. The show held auditions in eleven different locations around the Philippines as well as online and on social media. Ford Valencia, Joao Constancia, Niel Murillo, Russell Reyes, and Tristan Ramirez auditioned as solo acts, competed against other contestants, and ultimately won the competition. After winning, the members made guest appearances where they relayed their experiences during and after the competition and discussed their plans for the future, such as their debut album, singles, gigs, and tours.

=== 2017: BoybandPH ===
After winning, BoybandPH released their winning song "We Made It," followed by the official single "Unli" in 2016 and "Somebody" (originally by Depeche Mode) in 2017. All three songs were included in their self-titled debut album BoybandPH, which was released on February 4, 2017. They were also featured on Jona's single "Til the End of Time".

== Discography ==
=== Studio albums ===
Title	Album details	Peak chart positions		Certification
Title	Album details	PHI Hot	PHI Top 20	Certification
BoybandPH	Released: February 4, 2017; Label: Star Music; Formats: CD, digital download	—N/a (Note: Philippine Hot 100 and Philippine Top 20 were launched on June 12, 2017, prior to the release of their studio album, BoybandPH.)	—N/a	PARI: Gold
"—" denotes releases that did not chart or were not released in that region.

=== Singles ===
==== As lead artist ====
Title	Year	Peak chart positions		Album
Title	Year	PHI Hot	PHI Top 20	Album
"We Made It"	2016	—N/a	—N/a	BoybandPH
"Unli"	2017	—N/a	—N/a	BoybandPH
"Somebody"	2017	—N/a	—N/a	BoybandPH
"—" denotes releases that did not chart or were not released in that region.

==== As featured artist ====
Title	Year	Peak chart positions		Album
Title	Year	PHI Hot	PHI Top 20	Album
"Til the End of Time" (Jona feat. BoybandPH)	2017	—	—	Jona
"—" denotes releases that did not chart or were not released in that region.

== Filmography ==
=== Television ===
Year	Title	Role	Network
2016	Pinoy Boyband Superstar	Winners	ABS-CBN
2016	Tonight with Boy Abunda	Guests	ABS-CBN
2016	Gandang Gabi, Vice!	Guests	ABS-CBN
2016	Magandang Buhay	Guests	ABS-CBN
2017	Umagang Kay Ganda	Guests	ABS-CBN
2017	It's Showtime	Performers	ABS-CBN
2017–present	ASAP	Performers	ABS-CBN
2017	Minute to Win It	BoybandPH (Tristan as one of the winner)	ABS-CBN
2017	Myx	Celebrity VJs	Myx
2017	Family Feud	Themselves (celebrity players)	ABS-CBN
2018	I Can See Your Voice	Guest artists	ABS-CBN
2018	G Diaries (season 2)	Featured artists	ABS-CBN
2018	Wansapanataym: Ofishally Yours	Jason (Joao), Tofer (Tristan), Nigel (Niel), Froi (Ford) and Rex (Russell)	ABS-CBN
2018	Ngayon at Kailanman	Dominic (Joao), Oliver's friends (Russell & Ford)	ABS-CBN
2021	Maalaala Mo Kaya: Tungkod	Petrus (Joao)	ABS-CBN
2021	He's Into Her	Lee Roi Gozon (Joao)	ABS-CBN
2023	Can't Buy Me Love	Carlo Tan Tiu (Joao)	ABS-CBN

== Awards and nominations ==
Year	Award Giving-Body	Award(s)	Nominated work	Result
2017	Push Awards	Push Newcomer	—N/a	Nominated
2017	Rawr Awards	Favorite Group	—N/a	Won
2017	PPOP Awards for Young Artists	Rising Pop Performing Group of the Year	—N/a	Won
2018	MYX Music Awards	Group of the Year	—N/a	Won
2018	MYX Music Awards	Collaboration of the Year (with Jona)	Till The End Of Time	Nominated
2018	MYX Music Awards	Remake of the Year	Somebody	Nominated
2018	MYX Music Awards	MYX VJ of the Year	—N/a	Nominated
2018	49th Box-Office Entertainment Awards	Most Promising Recording/Performing Group	—N/a	Won
2018	MOR OPM Pinoy Music Awards	LSS Hit of the Year	Boyfriend	Nominated
2018	MOR OPM Pinoy Music Awards	Collaboration of the Year (with Jona)	Till The End of Time	Won
2018	9th PMPC Star Awards For Music	Music Video of the Year	Unli	Nominated
2018	9th PMPC Star Awards For Music	Pop Album of the Year	BoybandPH	Nominated
2018	9th PMPC Star Awards For Music	Dance Album of the Year	BoybandPH	Nominated
2018	9th PMPC Star Awards For Music	Duo/Group Artist of the Year	BoybandPH	Nominated
2018	31st Awit Awards	Best Collaboration (with Jona)	Till The End of Time	Nominated
2019	33rd PMPC Star Awards for Television	Best Male New TV Personality	Joao Constancia on "Ngayon At Kailanman"	Nominated
