= List of Nag-aapoy na Damdamin episodes =

Nag-aapoy na Damdamin (transl. Burning Feeling) is a Philippine drama romantic thriller series broadcast by Kapamilya Channel. It aired on the network's Kapamilya Gold block from July 25, 2023 to January 26, 2024.

== Series overview ==
Season	Episodes	Originally released	
Season	Episodes	First released	Last released
1	59	July 25, 2023	October 13, 2023
2	75	October 16, 2023	January 26, 2024

== Episodes ==
=== Season 1 ===
No. overall	No. in season	Title	TV title	Original release date	AGB Nielsen Ratings (NUTAM People)
1	1	"The Feud"	"Nag-aapoy na Damdamin"	July 25, 2023	1.4%
Conflicts arise between two families when Dr. Severino Salazar is indicted for medical malpractice after his best friend succumbed to a post-surgery complication. Taking the accusation to heart, the renowned surgeon makes a grave decision.
2	2	"The Sniper"	"Nag-aapoy na Puso"	July 26, 2023	1.4%
After the death of his parents, Philip plots to kill Lucas, whom he blames for his family's tragic fate. However, Philip’s plan ends up an utter failure when he realizes that he got the wrong target.
3	3	"The Wife"	"Nag-aapoy na Sugat"	July 27, 2023	1.6%
Philip rescues Olivia and keeps her under his care. After learning that Olivia loses her memory, Philip fakes her death and gives her a new identity to exact revenge on his archenemy. Meanwhile, Lucas refuses to believe that his wife is gone.
4	4	"The Weapon"	"Nag-aapoy na Kalokohan"	July 28, 2023	1.3%
Lucas completely becomes the worst version of himself as he grieves the death of his beloved wife. This, however, does not stop his friend Melinda from forcing herself on him. Philip introduces himself to Olivia as her husband.
5	5	"A New Leaf"	"Nag-aapoy na Panlilinlang"	July 31, 2023	1.6%
Philip leads a new life abroad with Olivia, who is now living under the name Claire Salazar. Meanwhile, Lucas moves on from Olivia's death and starts anew with Melinda. However, the two families' entangled past proves to be a thorn in their sides.
6	6	"The Return"	"Nag-aapoy na Plano"	August 1, 2023	1.7%
Philip is infuriated to find out that Joaquin allowed the Buencaminos to become part-owners of Salazar Medical Center. Claire's mysterious dreams and worries for Philip push her to fly back to the Philippines.
7	7	"String of Fate"	"Nag-aapoy na Isipan"	August 2, 2023	1.3%
Philip's instincts tell him there was foul play in Severino's death. With Claire's return, however, he is conflicted about whether to push through with his original plan of using her against the Buencaminos. Sofia grows curious about Philip’s wife.
8	8	"Push and Pull"	"Nag-aapoy na Harapan"	August 3, 2023	1.6%
As the Buencaminos target the board members of Salazar Medical Center, Philip thinks of a way to stop their plans. Luckily, an opportunity presents itself through Sofia.
9	9	"One Way Ticket"	"Nag-aapoy na Duda"	August 4, 2023	N/A
Philip wittingly secures his access to the Buencaminos' exclusive party. Lucas thinks of Olivia after catching sight of Claire. Later, the lawyer gets wind of Philip’s investigation into his late father’s closed case.
10	10	"Wives in Doubt"	"Nag-aapoy na Laban"	August 7, 2023	1.6%
After witnessing Philip and Lucas' heated fight, Sabrina finds herself questioning an old article she wrote about Dr. Severino Salazar. While an invitation to Victoria's party stirs Claire's curiosity, Melinda fumes over an old picture of Olivia.
11	11	"Party Crasher"	"Nag-aapoy na Resbak"	August 8, 2023	1.6%
Melinda and Lucas continue to argue over the latter’s dead wife. Philip makes his move to infiltrate the Buencaminos' grand event. Unbeknownst to Philip, Claire tries to find out the reason behind his strange actions.
12	12	"Life of the Party"	"Nag-aapoy na Pasabog"	August 9, 2023	N/A
Philip pushes through with his plan of exposing the Buencaminos at Victoria's own party. Meanwhile, Claire trusts her instincts and follows Philip to the party. There, she forms an instant connection with an unlikely person.
13	13	"Payback"	"Nag-aapoy na Eskandalo"	August 10, 2023	N/A
Philip feels a pang of guilt for having to lie to Claire about his retaliation against the Buencaminos. Greatly affected by the doctor's scandalous expose at his mother’s grand party, Lucas uses his influence to get even.
14	14	"Caged"	"Nag-aapoy na Banta"	August 11, 2023	N/A
Joaquin’s fears for Philip materialize when the authorities arrest the young doctor. An extremely worried Claire rushes to the precinct, only to be barred from seeing her husband. Philip remains unfazed, but Lucas makes sure he suffers in jail.
15	15	"The Perfect Pair"	"Nag-aapoy na Kalaban"	August 14, 2023	N/A
Lucas and Melinda rejoice as their efforts to retaliate against Philip pay off, unaware that their archnemesis manages to overturn his situation in jail. Troubled over her husband's predicament, Claire receives advice from a friend.
16	16	"The Call"	"Nag-aapoy na Kabaliwan"	August 15, 2023	N/A
After receiving pieces of advice from Sofia, a desperate Claire goes against Philip's requests and decides to contact the Buencaminos. Meanwhile, Melinda continues to live in the shadow of Lucas’ dead wife.
17	17	"Voice"	"Nag-aapoy na Alas"	August 16, 2023	N/A
Claire manages to get Lucas’ contact number. Hearing his late wife’s voice over the phone, Lucas loses focus, consequently giving Philip the upper hand during the latter’s initial hearing.
18	18	"The Room"	"Nag-aapoy na Pag-ibig"	August 17, 2023	N/A
After hearing Olivia's voice, Lucas seeks solace in a room filled with her memories. Just when Sabrina contemplates how she could develop her news story about the two families' long-standing feud, the solution to her problem finds its way to her.
19	19	"Sink or Swim"	"Nag-aapoy na Alaala"	August 18, 2023	N/A
Lucas loses another opportunity to gain the upper hand against the Salazars as memories of Olivia continue to distract him. Meanwhile, Philip starts to bounce back upon his return.
20	20	"For Better or For Worse"	"Nag-aapoy na Tapatan"	August 21, 2023	N/A
Lucas fumes when Philip earns the trust of the Salazar Medical Center's board members and receives a promotion. Claire comes clean to her husband about her attempt to approach the enemy as she conveys her support in his fight against the Buencaminos.
21	21	"Apparition"	"Nag-aapoy na Nakaraan"	August 22, 2023	N/A
After finding out that Lucas and Claire have crossed paths, Philip vows to prevent them from seeing each other again. Meanwhile, Lucas' constant longing allows him to see someone he has been yearning for.
22	22	"Reminiscence"	"Nag-aapoy na Palaisipan"	August 23, 2023	N/A
Melinda's heart shatters when she catches a drunk Lucas yearning for Olivia. As her mysterious dreams raise more questions about her life, Claire seeks help to recover her lost memories.
23	23	"Recovery Plan"	"Nag-aapoy na Pagtutuos"	August 24, 2023	N/A
Philip faces a new problem as the Buencaminos hatch another plot to bring him down, fueling Claire's desire to confront the political family. To make it up to Melinda, Lucas agrees to get rid of his secret room filled with Olivia's memories.
24	24	"Fabrication"	"Nag-aapoy na Balita"	August 25, 2023	N/A
The Buencaminos exhaust all means to push Philip into dire straits. After Sofia accuses her of being biased, Sabrina gives Philip an opportunity to address the malicious allegations against his late father.
25	25	"Refuge"	"Nag-aapoy na Kampihan"	August 28, 2023	1.7%
The Salazar Medical Center faces government inspection as the Buencaminos utilize their connections to tarnish the hospital's reputation. With this, Claire decides to take action and help Philip in his fight.
26	26	"Ghost from the Past"	"Nag-aapoy na Agawan"	August 29, 2023	N/A
Sofia’s heart shatters into pieces upon learning that her friend, Claire, is Philip’s wife. Melinda, likewise, finds herself dumbfounded when she crosses paths with Claire and notices her uncanny resemblance with Olivia.
27	27	"Turmoil"	"Nag-aapoy na Takot"	August 30, 2023	N/A
Misunderstandings arise between Claire and Philip as the latter forbids his worried wife from joining his fight against the Buencaminos. Melinda begins to live in fear of losing Lucas following her chance encounter with Claire.
28	28	"Zero In"	"Nag-aapoy na Hinala"	August 31, 2023	N/A
After learning that the woman with an uncanny resemblance to Olivia is Philip's wife, Melinda becomes more suspicious about Claire and digs into her background. Meanwhile, an incident prompts Claire to question her identity.
29	29	"Introspection"	"Nag-aapoy na Pagbabalik"	September 1, 2023	N/A
Melinda and Lucas start fresh with a new house, while Claire grows more curious about her past after recalling a forgotten skill. Philip fumes upon discovering that the Buencaminos are now the major shareholders of the Salazar Medical Center.
30	30	"A Glimpse"	"Nag-aapoy na Tensyon"	September 4, 2023	N/A
A surprise visit to the charity ward allows Claire to regain a glimpse of her forgotten memories and see Philip’s fight from a new perspective. Melinda digs deep into Philip’s mysterious wife.
31	31	"Bonds"	"Nag-aapoy na Suspetsa"	September 5, 2023	N/A
With Sofia's persuasion, Claire turns to social media to reconnect with her old friends and discover more about her past. Philip, meanwhile, grows suspicious of his ex-lover's motive in befriending his wife.
32	32	"Under New Management"	"Nag-aapoy na Kutob"	September 6, 2023	1.4%
Claire and Philip spare no effort to find help for the patients in the charity ward. However, dark clouds loom over them as the vindictive Buencaminos take control of the Salazar Medical Center.
33	33	"Lifeline"	"Nag-aapoy na Balak"	September 7, 2023	N/A
The Buencaminos rejoice in their successful take-over of the Salazar Medical Center. While Joaquin puts off his plans for the hospital for the time being, Philip wallows in sorrow as the charity ward closes down.
34	34	"Despair"	"Nag-aapoy na Galit"	September 8, 2023	N/A
The war between the two prominent families intensifies as the Buencaminos move to erase the Salazars' legacy from the hospital. Philip and Claire fight for a patient's life.
35	35	"Counterattack"	"Nag-aapoy na Sampal"	September 11, 2023	N/A
Amid the loss of a dear patient, grief ignites Claire's anger toward the Buencaminos and pushes her to strike back. Not long after, Lucas and Claire finally come face-to-face.
36	36	"Olivia"	"Nag-aapoy na Pagdududa"	September 12, 2023	1.5%
Philip strives to keep his secret hidden as Claire becomes curious about Olivia following her encounter with Lucas. Meanwhile, the troubled lawyer struggles to forget Claire's resemblances with his dead wife.
37	37	"Threatened Spouses"	"Nag-aapoy na Angkinan"	September 13, 2023	1.3%
Towering fears and suspicions prompt Melinda to confront Philip. Claire visits her mother's grave and discovers that Loleng lied to her. Meanwhile, Sofia begins to question her friend's true identity.
38	38	"Resemblance"	"Nag-aapoy na Lokohan"	September 14, 2023	1.8%
While Lucas stops at nothing to cause him trouble, Philip puts his attention on keeping Claire away from the truth. Melinda inches closer to uncovering Philip's secret.
39	39	"Envy"	"Nag-aapoy na Baliwan"	September 15, 2023	1.9%
Claire continues digging into her past after having another mysterious dream. While Lucas gets consumed with the possibility that Philip's wife is Olivia, Melinda obtains new information about her rival and pieces the puzzle together.
40	40	"Grace Under Pressure"	"Nag-aapoy na Selos"	September 18, 2023	N/A
Despite the Buencaminos’ vehement attack on her husband, Claire shows grace under pressure and approaches Lucas one more time. Witnessing this encounter, Melinda drowns her jealousy in alcohol.
41	41	"Wife Against Wife"	"Nag-aapoy na Angasan"	September 19, 2023	1.5%
Claire bravely squares up to Melinda when the latter accuses her of seducing Lucas. Concerned parents step in as Olivia remains a thorn in Lucas and Melinda's marriage.
42	42	"This Means War"	"Nag-aapoy na Face Off"	September 20, 2023	1.2%
At the business dinner for the hospital, Claire unknowingly becomes Philip's strongest weapon against the Buencaminos. Sofia uses her charms to get the truth about Claire's identity out of Emil, but to no avail.
43	43	"Yearning"	"Nag-aapoy na Gamitan"	September 21, 2023	1.4%
Philip finds himself torn between protecting his marriage and using his wife to torment his nemesis. Lucas's constant longing for Claire takes a toll on his relationship with Melinda.
44	44	"Torment"	"Nag-aapoy na Revelations"	September 22, 2023	1.8%
Claire traces her roots, while Melinda's worst nightmare turns into reality when she finally discovers Claire's true identity. Philip saves a critically wounded patient, unaware of a looming danger because of the latter.
45	45	"Ambush"	"Nag-aapoy na Ganti"	September 25, 2023	2.0%
The hospital's safety is compromised as Philip tries to save another patient. The Buencaminos see this as a chance to ruin his image and kick him out of the hospital.
46	46	"Set Up"	"Nag-aapoy na Lihim"	September 26, 2023	1.6%
Sofia finds a way to bring Claire and Lucas together. Philip sets his mind on investigating his father's death. Meanwhile, Melinda ensures that Claire's true identity remains hidden.
47	47	"Deceit"	"Nag-aapoy na Lokahan"	September 27, 2023	1.4%
Sofia forms an alliance with the enemy to break up Philip and Claire's marriage. Claire's doubts intensify as she slowly untangles Philip's web of lies. Sabrina reaches out to PO3 Paras for help in her investigation into Dr. Severino's death.
48	48	"Sneaking In"	"Nag-aapoy na Truth"	September 28, 2023	N/A
Claire dissolves in tears as she discovers the truth hidden in her parents' grave. PO3 Paras finally agrees to work with Sabrina as she remains persistent in investigating Dr. Severino's death. Lucas sneaks into the Salazars' home.
49	49	"Crossing Over"	"Nag-aapoy na Danger"	September 29, 2023	N/A
Melinda confronts Philip about his secret and uses it to threaten him. Meanwhile, Claire accepts Lucas' invitation in her desire to find out the truth about herself.
50	50	"Steering Away"	"Nag-aapoy na Bawian"	October 2, 2023	1.6%
After Lucas backed out of their plan, Sofia informs Philip of Claire and his archenemy’s meetup. Unknown to Sofia, Lucas has a more clever plan in mind.
51	51	"Within Reach"	"Nag-aapoy na Pagkikita"	October 3, 2023	1.5%
Claire's DNA test result leaves Lucas crestfallen, unaware of Melinda's plot to keep the truth from him. Claire distances herself from Philip as her doubts about him grow. Unbeknownst to them, fate has its way of reuniting two separated lovers.
52	52	"The Show"	"Nag-aapoy na Singilan"	October 4, 2023	2.0%
After an argument with Philip, Claire figures in a minor accident and regains her lost memories. Now aware of the truth, the aggrieved wife puts on an act to get back at those who manipulated her.
53	53	"Conceding"	"Nag-aapoy na Laro"	October 5, 2023	2.0%
While Philip and Joaquin work together to uncover the truth behind Severino's death, Victoria receives an alarming call. With a false front, Claire meets with Lucas and asks him about the night Olivia died.
54	54	"Already Gone"	"Nag-aapoy na Panloloko"	October 6, 2023	1.7%
Claire begins to confront the people who helped Philip deceive her one by one. After Philip obtains the police report on his father's death from Balmaceda, an unforeseen tragedy hits the Salazars. Lucas teams up with Sofia anew.
55	55	"Concealed Truth"	"Nag-aapoy na Sampalan"	October 9, 2023	N/A
Philip becomes devastated to learn that there was no foul play in his father’s death. Unknown to him, the truth has been already concealed by a faceless enemy. Claire confronts Melinda after discovering what the latter did.
56	56	"Farewell"	"Nag-aapoy na Gulit Trip"	October 10, 2023	N/A
Melinda erupts in rage when she learns about what transpired between Lucas and Claire on the night they accidentally met. While Claire lays a guilt trip on her unsuspecting confidantes, Sofia's hatred toward her rival intensifies.
57	57	"Unravel"	"Nag-aapoy na Poot"	October 11, 2023	1.6%
While Philip decides to leave his painful past behind and start fresh abroad, Claire's anger heightens when she discovers another secret of his. The doctor's plans soon take an unexpected turn after his wife fails to show up at the airport.
58	58	"Lost"	"Nag-aapoy, Nawawala"	October 12, 2023	N/A
As Claire goes missing, Philip and Lucas scramble to their feet to find her. Soon, Claire's sudden disappearance stirs up various speculations and causes more trouble.
59	59	"Suspects"	"Nag-aapoy na Katotohanan"	October 13, 2023	1.7%
Philip and Lucas leave no stone unturned to find Claire until an anonymous tip leads them to her whereabouts. Soon, a shocking revelation turns their worlds upside down.

=== Season 2 ===
No. overall	No. in season	Title	TV title	Original release date	AGB Nielsen Ratings (NUTAM People)
60	1	"Rescue"	"Nag-aapoy na Pagbabago"	October 16, 2023	1.8%
61	2	"Broken Ties"	"Nag-aapoy na Paghihiganti"	October 17, 2023	1.5%
62	3	"Down Memory Lane"	"Nag-aapoy na Mastermind"	October 18, 2023	2.0%
63	4	"Jeopardy"	"Nag-aapoy na Pa-Victim"	October 19, 2023	2.0%
64	5	"Life Lost, Life Found"	"Nag-aapoy na First Wife"	October 20, 2023	N/A
65	6	"Retribution"	"Nag-aapoy na Ganti Era"	October 23, 2023	N/A
66	7	"To Start Over"	"Nag-aapoy na Olivia"	October 24, 2023	N/A
67	8	"The Lion's Den"	"Nag-aapoy na Kaso"	October 25, 2023	1.3%
68	9	"Three's a Crowd"	"Nag-aapoy na Parusa"	October 26, 2023	1.3%
69	10	"Skeleton in the Closet"	"Nag-aapoy na Salpukan"	October 27, 2023	1.4%
70	11	"Home Sweet Home"	"Nag-aapoy na Hangalan"	October 30, 2023	1.5%
71	12	"Outcast"	"Nag-aapoy na Trick or Freak"	October 31, 2023	N/A
72	13	"Battlefield"	"Nag-aapoy, Patay na Patay"	November 1, 2023	1.4%
73	14	"Two Wives"	"Nag-aapoy na Welcome"	November 2, 2023	N/A
74	15	"Into the Rabbit Hole"	"Nag-aapoy na Two Wives"	November 3, 2023	N/A
75	16	"More Than Meets the Eye"	"Nag-aapoy na Suspicion"	November 6, 2023	1.8%
76	17	"A Sense of Purpose"	"Nag-aapoy na Simula"	November 7, 2023	N/A
77	18	"The Clash of Two Queens"	"Nag-aapoy na Sabunutan"	November 8, 2023	1.5%
78	19	"Violence"	"Nag-aapoy na Banggaan"	November 9, 2023	1.4%
79	20	"To Dig Up a Grave"	"Nag-aapoy na Kasalanan"	November 10, 2023	1.6%
80	21	"The End Times Have Begun"	"Nag-aapoy, Nagliliyab"	November 13, 2023	N/A
81	22	"Day of Reckoning"	"Nag-aapoy na Karma"	November 14, 2023	1.7%
82	23	"Separate Ways"	"Nag-aapoy na Kulungan"	November 15, 2023	1.7%
83	24	"Cutting Ties"	"Nag-aapoy na Dalaw"	November 16, 2023	2.0%
84	25	"The Offer"	"Nag-aapoy na Tiwala"	November 17, 2023	1.6%
85	26	"Protecting Justice"	"Nag-aapoy na Paglaban"	November 20, 2023	N/A
86	27	"Public Trial"	"Nag-aapoy na Siraan"	November 21, 2023	N/A
87	28	"Illicit Affairs"	"Nag-aapoy na Kabayaran"	November 22, 2023	1.5%
88	29	"Losing and Suffering"	"Nag-aapoy na Hatol"	November 23, 2023	N/A
89	30	"In the Ruins"	"Nag-aapoy, Nag Pupumiglas"	November 24, 2023	N/A
90	31	"Long Sanity"	"Nag-aapoy na Baliw"	November 27, 2023	1.9%
91	32	"Hurdles"	"Nag-aapoy na Sumpa"	November 28, 2023	1.8%
92	33	"Fuel and Fire"	"Nag-aapoy na Aminan"	November 29, 2023	1.5%
93	34	"Haven"	"Nag-aapoy na Pag-asa"	November 30, 2023	1.5%
94	35	"A Mother's Secret"	"Nag-aapoy na Pilitan"	December 1, 2023	1.9%
95	36	"Delirium"	"Nag-aapoy na Paghirap"	December 4, 2023	1.5%
96	37	"Savior"	"Nag-aapoy na Elias"	December 5, 2023	N/A
97	38	"Friend or Foe"	"Nag-aapoy na Pagkawala"	December 6, 2023	1.7%
98	39	"Knight"	"Nag-aapoy na Espiya"	December 7, 2023	2.0%
99	40	"Damage Control"	"Nag-aapoy na Alyansa"	December 8, 2023	2.2%
100	41	"Doubts"	"Nag-aapoy na Halaga"	December 11, 2023	1.7%
101	42	"Wish Granted"	"Nag-aapoy na Paghahanda"	December 12, 2023	1.8%
102	43	"Parting Ways"	"Nag-aapoy na Tagpo"	December 13, 2023	2.0%
103	44	"To Fight and To Win"	"Nag-aapoy na Hangal"	December 14, 2023	1.8%
104	45	"Everything's Fine"	"Nag-aapoy na Sakit"	December 15, 2023	1.7%
105	46	"Parting Gift"	"Nag-aapoy na Kakampi"	December 18, 2023	1.5%
106	47	"Trust Fall"	"Nag-aapoy na Fake News"	December 19, 2023	1.6%
107	48	"Backfire"	"Nag-aapoy na Kapalit"	December 20, 2023	1.9%
108	49	"Strike"	"Nag-aapoy na Palaban"	December 21, 2023	1.7%
109	50	"Trojan Horse"	"Nag-aapoy na Pusong Bato"	December 22, 2023	1.9%
110	51	"Playing Cards"	"Nag-aapoy na Mind Games"	December 25, 2023	1.2%
111	52	"Unwavering"	"Nag-aapoy na Second Chance"	December 26, 2023	1.7%
112	53	"Defeat"	"Nag-aapoy na Pagkatalo"	December 27, 2023	1.6%
113	54	"Game Face"	"Nag-aapoy na Game Face"	December 28, 2023	1.8%
114	55	"Pointing Fingers"	"Nag-aapoy na Loser"	December 29, 2023	1.8%
115	56	"The Kingdom's Downfall"	"Nag-aapoy na Bagong Taon"	January 1, 2024	1.6%
116	57	"Retaking The Throne"	"Nag-aapoy na Comeback"	January 2, 2024	1.8%
117	58	"Dethroned Queen"	"Nag-aapoy na Pagtutol"	January 3, 2024	1.8%
118	59	"Detachment"	"Nag-aapoy na Pagkatao"	January 4, 2024	2.0%
119	60	"Master Plan"	"Nag-aapoy na Kalungkutan"	January 5, 2024	1.8%
120	61	"On Watchful Eyes"	"Nag-aapoy na Expose"	January 8, 2024	1.8%
121	62	"The Untold"	"Nag-aapoy na Sulat"	January 9, 2024	1.8%
122	63	"The Lost Son"	"Nag-aapoy na Offer"	January 10, 2024	1.7%
123	64	"The True Victims"	"Nag-aapoy na Pagtatapat"	January 11, 2024	1.6%
124	65	"The Target"	"Nag-aapoy na Kadugo"	January 12, 2024	1.8%
125	66	"Knight Falls"	"Knight Falls"	January 15, 2024	1.9%
126	67	"Life and Death"	"Life and Death"	January 16, 2024	1.5%
127	68	"The Cover Up"	"Cover Up"	January 17, 2024	2.2%
128	69	"The Knight's Execution"	"Dark Secrets"	January 18, 2024	2.1%
129	70	"Wake-Up Call"	"Wake-up Call"	January 19, 2024	1.9%
130	71	"In Triumph and Defeat"	"The Final Battle"	January 22, 2024	1.9%
131	72	"One Shot"	"The Final Heartache"	January 23, 2024	1.6%
132	73	"Letting Go"	"The Final Pride"	January 24, 2024	2.3%
133	74	"The Entrapment"	"The Final Entrapment"	January 25, 2024	2.2%
134	75	"Moving On"	"The Final Checkmate"	January 26, 2024	2.2%
