= Nag-aapoy Na Damdamin =

2023–24 Philippine television drama series

- Promotional poster for season 2
- Genre: Melodrama; Revenge; Romantic thriller
- Written by: Ma. Carmela L. Abaygar; Jasper Emmanuel A. Paras; Jann Kayla C. Mendoza; Erica Frances A. Bautista
- Directed by: FM Reyes; Benedict Mique; Bjoy Balagtas
- Starring: Jane Oineza; JC de Vera; Ria Atayde; Tony Labrusca
- Music by: Francis S. Concio
- Opening theme: "Nag-aapoy na Damdamin" by Allison Tanner
- Ending theme: "Hawak Mo" by Lyka Estrella
- Composer: Jonathan Manalo
- Country of origin: Philippines
- Original language: Filipino
- No. of seasons: 2
- No. of episodes: 134 (list of episodes)

Production
- Executive producers: Jane J. Basas; Guido R. Zaballero; Carlo Katigbak; Cory Vidanes; Laurenti Dyogi
- Producers: Sienna G. Olaso; Maya M. Aralar; Marissa V. Kalaw
- Editors: Mark Segubience; Kathleen S. Chavez; Ron Joseph G. Ilagan
- Production company: JRB Creative Productions

Original release
- Network: Kapamilya Channel (Note: The series also aired on A2Z, Kapamilya Online Live, and on-demand via iWantTFC.); TV5
- Release: July 25, 2023 – January 26, 2024

Nag-aapoy na Damdamin (transl. Burning Feeling / International Title: Flames of Vengeance) is a Philippine television drama romantic thriller series broadcast by Kapamilya Channel and TV5. The series was directed by FM Reyes, Benedict Mique, and Bjoy Balagtas, and stars JC de Vera, Ria Atayde, Tony Labrusca, and Jane Oineza. It aired on the Kapamilya Channel's Kapamilya Gold afternoon block and TV5's Hapon Champion block, and worldwide via The Filipino Channel.

== Plot ==
Dr. Philip Salazar and Atty. Lucas Buencamino share a deep childhood bond rooted in their fathers' close friendship; however, tragedy strikes when Lucas' father, Congressman Javier Buencamino, dies during surgery performed by Philip's father, Dr. Severino Salazar. This incident fuels a bitter feud between the two families, exacerbated by a substantial inheritance left by Congressman Javier to the hospital founded by the elder Salazar.

Lucas' mother, also a powerful politician, launches a campaign to reclaim the inherited funds, orchestrating events that tarnish Dr. Severino Salazar's reputation by giving him the moniker of a "Killer Doctor." They manipulate circumstances and character assassinations, leading to what appears to be the elder Salazar's suicide. They bribe Chief Investigator Balmaceda to cover up evidence of murder and close the case.

Philip, devastated and seeking revenge for his father's death, plots to murder Lucas. However, an accident meant for Lucas critically injures Olivia, instead. Unbeknownst to Lucas, Philip saves Olivia and nurses her back to health. Partly in order to spite Lucas, he capitalizes on her amnesia and convinces her she is his wife, Claire. Satisfied by Lucas' loss, Philip takes Claire to America to start a new life.

Lucas, grieving for Olivia, marries his best friend and law school colleague, Melinda Avecilla, while still in mourning.

Meanwhile, the Salazar General Hospital faces financial trouble due to the Buencaminos' relentless smear campaigns and takeover attempts. Philip returns to Manila to aid his father's co-founder, Dr. Joaquin Serrano, in saving the hospital. His plan for a short visit becomes permanent. Claire travels back to the Philippines to support Philip, still believing she is his wife.

Despite warning Claire not to interfere, she champions Philip against the Buencaminos. Philip and Claire's love deepens, but Philip fears the return of Claire's memory. Philip witnesses the emotional toll Olivia's presence takes on Lucas but keeps his distance.

Claire begins to recall fragments of her past, including vivid dreams of domestic violence and flashes of Lucas's face. As she investigates her life, she discovers Philip's stories were fabricated and that she is, in fact, Olivia De Amor-Buencamino, the long-dead wife of her husband's archenemy.

Furious at Philip's lies and betrayal, she decides to keep what she knows to herself. Determined to uncover the full truth, she digs further to discover what really happened before the accident, the true nature of her life with Lucas, and why Philip was at the crash site that day.

Claire bides her time until she can finally unravel the mystery and reveal the truth to Philip and Lucas.

Philip is deceived by the false information he finds in a folder about his father's death. Believing the lies to be true, he comes to the painful realization that his long pursuit of justice has been for nothing.

Following his decision to go back to America with Claire, she stages her own kidnapping. As the people around her worry, and the two husbands race to save her, she finally reveals the truth to everyone that she is Lucas' wife. She is immediately rushed to the hospital after she abruptly faints.

As Olivia wakes up, she tells the truth about her accident and puts the blame on Philip for her staged kidnapping.

As a result, Philip is arrested for his crimes and Olivia is released from the hospital. She begins trying to rebuild her life with Lucas, much to Victoria and Melinda's dismay. Consumed by anger and a thirst for vengeance, she sets out to confront each person who betrayed her, one by one.

Inside the hospital, Emil also gets arrested, leaving he and Philip with a strained friendship in prison. Olivia returns to the Buencamino mansion after she withdraws her case against the hospital, prompting Melinda to move in the mansion once more.

With a war between Melinda and Olivia on set, the truth about Olivia's father, Luis, starts to unfold. Haunted by the past, Victoria meets with Santiago Quijada, a corrupt police officer responsible for committing Victoria's favors.

Santiago and Victoria try to cover up the past while Olivia investigates her father's death. Inside the prison, Philip's friendship with Emil starts to heal as Philip rescues him during a prison fight. After all the commotion, their fellow inmate Pablo starts to speak up about the truth of his father's death.

As Olivia's investigation reaches a conclusion, she digs up evidence from her memories and gets Victoria arrested.

In an attempt to save Victoria, Melinda tries to destroy Olivia's reputation to lose her credibility in court, including revelations of her staged kidnapping. With Philip and Victoria's trials reaching a verdict, both of them are proven to be not guilty.

Devastated by the loss, Olivia's life gets even worse as she is sent to a mental institution.

Amidst all the maltreatment Olivia faces in the institution, she meets another patient named Isabel, a mother waiting for her son, Elias.

Outside of the institution, Lucas sets Philip's house on fire. After another tragedy, Philip and Emil try to convince the institution of Olivia's sanity.

Victoria orders Santiago to kidnap Olivia and make her suffer. An unexpected person saves her.

== Cast and characters ==
Main cast

- Jane Oineza as Ana Olivia D. De Amor-Buencamino (Note: Olivia was adopted by the Natividads after becoming orphaned as a child, but retained her biological surname De Amor.) / Claire Bautista-Salazar
- JC de Vera as Dr. Philip Antonio E. Salazar (Note: Philip's middle name is Estrella per the police reports of his late parents, but was incorrectly said as Estella during the court verdict.)
- Ria Atayde as Melinda Avecilla-Buencamino
- Tony Labrusca as Atty. Lucas Iñigo O. Buencamino

Supporting cast

- Maila Gumila as Cong. Victoria A. Ocampo-Buencamino
  - Kira Balinger as young Victoria
- Joko Diaz as Dr. Joaquin Eduardo D. Serrano
  - Karl Gabriel as young Joaquin
- Nico Antonio as Dr. Emilio Renz C. Abello
- Kim Rodriguez as Sofia Serrano†
- Aya Fernandez as Sabrina Dominguez
- Jef Gaitan as Amanda Alvarez
- LA Santos as Dr. Francis Venturina
- Elyson de Dios as PSSg Tommy Paras
- Mauro Lumba as Raul / Clavio
- Carla Martinez as Loleng Arevalo
- Malou Crisologo as Minya Dela Cruz
- Lito Pimentel as Jus. Napoleon Avecilla
- Simon Ibarra as PCOL Santiago "Matias" J. Quijada
- Ejay Falcon as Elias B. Delgado† (Note: Elias and Isabel's middle name initial is B for Bermudez per his nameplate & medical records. However, on their graves, this is T.)
  - Miguel Vergara as young Elias

Guest cast

- Jeffrey Santos as Dr. Severino Immanuel Salazar†
  - Andrew Muhlach as young Severino
- Richard Quan as Cong. Javier Domingo C. Buencamino† (Note: Javier's second first name is Domingo per his medical records. However, in his last will and testament, it is Alberto.)
  - Marlo Mortel as young Javier
- Lovely Rivero as Ma. Elena Estrella-Salazar†
- Jong Cuenco as Manuel Montenegro
- William Lorenzo as Luis Natividad†
- Melissa Mendez as Rosa Natividad†
- Joyce Anne Burton as Isabel B. Delgado†
  - Claire Ruiz as young Isabel
- Dawn Chang as Dahlia Diaz-De Amor
- Eric Fructuoso as Bruno
- Raul Montesa as Professor Escario
- Giovanni Baldisseri as Benito de Mesa
- Romulo Bernabe as Co-counselor of Lucas
- Dwin Araza as Co-counselor of Lucas
- Malou Canzana as Marie
- Khaleil Patrianco as Jenny
- Melissa Tongol as Fely
- Kimmy Obena as Lena
- Rufino Ngo as Dante
- Heidi Arima as Minerva Alcantara
- Christina Aguirre as Liza
- Giulio Martile as Dimayuga
- Mark Manicad as Henry Fernandez
- David Minemoto as Atty. Denver Aranya

== Production ==
The main cast of the series was revealed on May 19, 2023, during the press conference for the then-upcoming television series. The following week, filming for the series began.

== Promotion ==
The casts held a back-to-back caravan at Vista Mall in Bataan along with the cast of Pira-Pirasong Paraiso. The official full trailer of the series was released on July 10, 2023.

The series, alongside Pira-Pirasong Paraiso, is co-produced by ABS-CBN and TV5, respectively. Unfortunately, It's Showtime's blocktime agreement with TV5 was axed on June 30, 2023. Then, it moved to GMA Network's sister channel GTV a day later before it expanded the simulcast into AMBS' All TV and GMA Network's main channel nearly a year later. Because of this, the cast was not allowed to appear on the said show to promote the series. Instead, they promoted both shows on TV5's new noontime show, Eat Bulaga! (then known by its interim title E.A.T.).

== Accolades ==
Accolades received by Nag-aapoy na Damdamin
Year	Awards ceremony	Title	Recipient	Result	Ref.
2023	Tag Awards Chicago	Best Actress	Jane Oineza	Won	
2023	Tag Awards Chicago	Best Actor	JC de Vera	Nominated	
2023	Tag Awards Chicago	Best Supporting Actress	Ria Atayde	Nominated	
2024	VP Choice Awards	TV Series of the Year (Afternoon)	Nag-aapoy na Damdamin	Nominated	
2024	VP Choice Awards	TV Actor of the Year (Afternoon)	JC de Vera	Nominated	
2024	VP Choice Awards	TV Actress of the Year	Jane Oineza	Nominated	
