= Jin Macapagal =

Filipino actor, model and dancer

- Born: Jindric Sagalongos Macapagal; July 29, 1995 (age 30); Cebu City, Philippines
- Occupations: Actor; model; dancer
- Years active: 2019–present
- Agents: Aguila Entertainment; Star Magic; Sparkle
- Height: 5 ft 8 in (1.73 m)

Jindric Sagalongos Macapagal (born July 29, 1995) is a Filipino actor, model and dancer. In 2019, he was named as the ABS-CBN Ultimate BidaMan on the It's Showtime segment BidaMan.

== Early life and education ==
Macapagal was born on July 29, 1995, in Cebu City. He is the youngest of three children of Carlo Macapagal, a Manileño, and Agnes Sagalongos, a Cebuana. His first name Jindric is derived from his elder brothers' names. Their names are Jin and Cydric.

In 2017, he graduated with a major in physical therapy from Cebu Doctors' University.

== Career ==
=== 2016: Pinoy Boyband Superstar ===
In 2016 (as Jindric Macapagal), he auditioned at ABS-CBN's competition on search for the newest boyband in the Philippines Pinoy Boyband Superstar where he got 95% of the votes from the all-girl audience on the first round. He made it at the Top 20 but did not make it at the Top 12 stage.

=== 2019–2023: It's Showtime and ASAP Natin 'To ===
In 2019, Macapagal auditioned on It's Showtime's segment BidaMan, a search for newest leading man in the Philippines. He was renamed as Jin Macapagal. On March 23, 2019, he was the Week 2 winner.

On August 10, 2019, at the grand finals, he was hailed as the Ultimate BidaMan.

From 2019 to 2023, he became a regular dance performer on ASAP Natin 'To.

=== 2024–present: GMA Network ===
In 2024, Macapagal transferred to GMA Network. He is currently an artist of Sparkle GMA Artist Center.

== Filmography ==
=== Movies ===
Year	Title	Role
2018	ML	Carlo's friend
2018	Double Twisting Double Back	man trying the slackline
2019	Damaso: The Musical	Crisostomo Ibarra
2019	Wild Little Love	Jake's brother
2019	The Mall, The Merrier	Ewan (tongue-tied boyfriend of Morissette Molina)
2020	Us Again	Paulo
2020	Suarez: The Healing Priest	young Father Fernando Suarez
2021	Hello Stranger: The Movie	James

=== Television ===
Year	Title	Role
2020	Maalaala Mo Kaya: Tren	Dale
2016	Pinoy Boyband Superstar	Himself/contestant
2019–2023	ASAP Natin 'To	Himself/dance performer
2019–2020	It's Showtime	Himself/Ultimate BidaMan/dance performer
2024	Jose and Maria's Bonggang Villa	Felipe
2024	Black Rider	Miguelito's cousin
2024	Tadhana	Tisoy dela Cruz
2024	Magpakailanman: BF Ko Ang Tatay ng BFF Ko	Mark
2024–2025	Shining Inheritance	Elmo
2025	Pepito Manaloto	Ralph
2025	Slay	Jigger

=== Web series ===
Year	Title	Role
2022	52 Weeks	Gab

== Accolades ==
=== Movies ===
Year	Category	Movie	Organization	Result	Reference
2021	New Movie Actor of the Year	Damaso: The Musical	36th PMPC Star Awards for Movies	Nominated	

=== Television ===
Year	Category	TV Program	Organization	Result	Reference
2021	New Male TV Personality	It's Showtime	34th PMPC Star Awards for Television	Nominated	
