= List of Ngayon at Kailanman episodes =

Ngayon at Kailanman (International title: Now and Forever) is a 2018 Philippine drama television series starring Julia Barretto and Joshua Garcia. The series premiered on ABS-CBN's Primetime Bida evening block and worldwide via The Filipino Channel from August 20, 2018 to January 18, 2019, replacing Bagani.

== Series overview ==
Season	Episodes	Originally released	
Season	Episodes	First released	Last released
1	110	August 20, 2018	January 18, 2019

== Episodes ==
=== Season 1 (2018–19) ===
No. overall	No. in season	Title	Original release date	Kantar Media Ratings (nationwide)
1	1	"Simula ng Kailanman"	August 20, 2018	31.2%
2	2	"Ngayon ang Bagong Buhay"	August 21, 2018	30.5%
3	3	"Ngayon Malaki na Sila"	August 22, 2018	31.1%
4	4	"Maling Akala"	August 23, 2018	30.2%
5	5	"Krus na Landas"	August 24, 2018	30.9%
6	6	"Proposal"	August 27, 2018	29.2%
7	7	"Palitan"	August 28, 2018	30.6%
8	8	"Kasunduan"	August 29, 2018	29.1%
9	9	"Kunwari"	August 30, 2018	28.7%
10	10	"Para sa Pamilya"	August 31, 2018	27.3%
11	11	"Desperada"	September 3, 2018	29.9%
12	12	"Survivor"	September 4, 2018	28.2%
13	13	"Interrogation"	September 5, 2018	27.9%
14	14	"The Secret"	September 6, 2018	28.5%
15	15	"Face to Face"	September 7, 2018	29.8%
16	16	"Imbestiga"	September 10, 2018	28.7%
17	17	"Kumpirmado"	September 11, 2018	28.4%
18	18	"Gulatan"	September 12, 2018	28.0%
19	19	"Paraparaan"	September 13, 2018	27.6%
20	20	"Ungkatan"	September 14, 2018	26.7%
21	21	"Atraksyon"	September 17, 2018	25.8%
22	22	"Autopsy"	September 18, 2018	28.5%
23	23	"Sapak"	September 19, 2018	27.0%
24	24	"Triggered"	September 20, 2018	N/A
25	25	"To the Rescue"	September 21, 2018	29.7%
26	26	"Pursigido"	September 24, 2018	28.2%
27	27	"Walang Atrasan"	September 25, 2018	29.0%
28	28	"Diskarteng Malupit"	September 26, 2018	30.2%
29	29	"Nalilito"	September 27, 2018	29.5%
30	30	"Lagot Na"	September 28, 2018	28.5%
31	31	"Tuloy Pa Rin"	October 1, 2018	28.8%
32	32	"Simula ng Ganti"	October 2, 2018	28.9%
33	33	"Paunahan"	October 3, 2018	28.2%
34	34	"Udlot"	October 4, 2018	29.4%
35	35	"Alas"	October 5, 2018	26.3%
36	36	"No Deal"	October 8, 2018	29.3%
37	37	"Bagyo"	October 9, 2018	29.5%
38	38	"Salubong"	October 10, 2018	28.5%
39	39	"Pabonggahan"	October 11, 2018	29.7%
40	40	"Copycat"	October 12, 2018	28.4%
41	41	"Apoy"	October 15, 2018	30.1%
42	42	"Laglagan"	October 16, 2018	28.9%
43	43	"Pilitan"	October 17, 2018	28.7%
44	44	"Banatan"	October 18, 2018	30.0%
45	45	"Nagpapatunay"	October 19, 2018	28.7%
46	46	"Himala"	October 22, 2018	31.1%
47	47	"Spotlight"	October 23, 2018	33.4%
48	48	"Truth and Consequence"	October 24, 2018	31.5%
49	49	"Kakakaba"	October 25, 2018	30.9%
50	50	"Gigil"	October 26, 2018	29.8%
51	51	"Pain Point"	October 29, 2018	30.0%
52	52	"Nondate"	October 30, 2018	29.4%
53	53	"Blast from the Past"	October 31, 2018	28.0%
54	54	"Finding Eva"	November 1, 2018	28.2%
55	55	"Claim Mo Na"	November 2, 2018	29.0%
56	56	"Ready or Not"	November 5, 2018	27.9%
57	57	"Flashback"	November 6, 2018	29.3%
58	58	"Step by Step"	November 7, 2018	29.1%
59	59	"Walwal"	November 8, 2018	31.0%
60	60	"The Mark"	November 9, 2018	28.6%
61	61	"Showtime"	November 12, 2018	27.1%
62	62	"Stalker"	November 13, 2018	29.5%
63	63	"Closer"	November 14, 2018	26.7%
64	64	"Playtime"	November 15, 2018	30.6%
65	65	"Kutob"	November 16, 2018	26.3%
66	66	"Dukot"	November 19, 2018	29.4%
67	67	"Slap Smack"	November 20, 2018	30.9%
68	68	"Disclosure"	November 21, 2018	31.4%
69	69	"Dudang Duda"	November 22, 2018	30.0%
70	70	"Wheel of Fortune"	November 23, 2018	28.5%
71	71	"Its Complicated"	November 26, 2018	29.1%
72	72	"Strategy"	November 27, 2018	30.0%
73	73	"Rumble"	November 28, 2018	28.7%
74	74	"Confirmed"	November 29, 2018	30.9%
75	75	"Big Reveal"	November 30, 2018	27.9%
76	76	"Red Alert"	December 3, 2018	27.6%
77	77	"May Nanalo Na"	December 4, 2018	29.5%
78	78	"Buking"	December 5, 2018	28.7%
79	79	"Damay Damay"	December 6, 2018	30.6%
80	80	"Ultimate Chaos"	December 7, 2018	27.8%
81	81	"Guilty"	December 10, 2018	28.9%
82	82	"True Confession"	December 11, 2018	30.0%
83	83	"5050"	December 12, 2018	28.3%
84	84	"Sampal"	December 13, 2018	28.6%
85	85	"Wake Up"	December 14, 2018	25.7%
86	86	"The Heiress"	December 17, 2018	29.5%
87	87	"After Year"	December 18, 2018	27.7%
88	88	"Bagong Buhay"	December 19, 2018	26.0%
89	89	"Again"	December 20, 2018	27.5%
90	90	"The Offer"	December 21, 2018	28.0%
91	91	"Selos Selos Much"	December 24, 2018	22.3%
92	92	"SMC"	December 25, 2018	23.7%
93	93	"Affected Much"	December 26, 2018	27.5%
94	94	"Sabotage"	December 27, 2018	28.5%
95	95	"Pardon"	December 28, 2018	27.8%
96	96	"Good News Bad News"	December 31, 2018	21.5%
97	97	"New Life Options"	January 1, 2019	25.2%
98	98	"Obsession"	January 2, 2019	27.5%
99	99	"Reawaken"	January 3, 2019	26.7%
100	100	"Laban Bawi"	January 4, 2019	27.7%
101	101	"Last 10 Surprises"	January 7, 2019	28.6%
102	102	"Last 9 Lies"	January 8, 2019	28.6%
103	103	"Love or H8"	January 9, 2019	27.6%
104	104	"7 Deadly Moves"	January 10, 2019	29.7%
105	105	"Sixplosive Decisions"	January 11, 2019	27.3%
106	106	"5 and Fighting"	January 14, 2019	28.5%
107	107	"4ever or Never"	January 15, 2019	29.0%
108	108	"In Dang 3r"	January 16, 2019	27.7%
109	109	"2 Do or 2 Die"	January 17, 2019	32.9%
110	110	"Dulo ng Kailanman"	January 18, 2019	34.7%
