= Pinoy Boyband Superstar =

2016 Philippine television reality show

- Title card
- Genre: Reality
- Created by: Simon Cowell
- Written by: Aol Rivera; Kaye Etong
- Directed by: Johnny Manahan
- Presented by: Billy Crawford
- Judges: Aga Muhlach; Yeng Constantino; Sandara Park; Vice Ganda
- Country of origin: Philippines
- Original language: Tagalog
- No. of seasons: 1
- No. of episodes: 30

Production
- Executive producer: Peter Edward Dizon
- Producer: Allan Sunga
- Production locations: Muntinlupa Sports Complex, Muntinlupa (Judges' Audition); Studio 10, ABS-CBN Broadcasting Center, Quezon City (Middle Rounds); Studio 2, ABS-CBN Broadcasting Center, Quezon City (Live Shows); ABS-CBN Compound, Quezon City (The Grand Reveal)
- Camera setup: Multicamera
- Running time: 30-45 minutes
- Production companies: ABS-CBN Entertainment; FremantleMedia Asia

Original release
- Network: ABS-CBN
- Release: September 10 – December 11, 2016

Pinoy Boyband Superstar is a Philippine reality singing competition shown on ABS-CBN. Hosted by Billy Crawford and judges by Aga Muhlach, Yeng Constantino, Sandara Park and Vice Ganda, it aired on the network's Yes Weekend line up from September 10 to December 11, 2016, replacing the third season of The Voice Kids and was replaced by first season of Your Face Sounds Familiar Kids . The goal of the show is to find the members for the newest "Pinoy boyband" (all-male Filipino pop group).

The 5-member Pinoy Boyband would win talent management contract from Star Magic, a recording contract from Star Music, 5 units of Yamaha Mio motorcycles and a total cash prize of ₱5,000,000 tax free from Yamaha and ABS-CBN.

Niel Murillo, Russell Reyes, Ford Valencia, Tristan Ramirez and Joao Constancia are the members of the first Pinoy Boyband called BoybandPH. They performed their first single, "We Made It", at the end of the show.

== Overview ==
Pinoy Band Superstar is based on the Latin-American singing competition series La Banda created by Simon Cowell and shown on Univision. According to ABS-CBN: "the reality show aims to find new Pinoy boy bands that will bring romance and good music to television viewers."

== Format ==
The audience will have a big part in choosing the boy bands. According to the host, performers will have to go through the all-female audience first and have at least 75% of them for approval before performing in front of the judges. Crawford also acknowledged that it would not be easy to look for new boy bands. He stated: "...it's not all about the looks -- it's about the charm, about the performance. [Judges would also have] special technical aspects [in order for them] to save a performer from the audience..."

== Development ==
On August 6, ABS-CBN uploaded a video teaser of Pinoy Boyband Superstar on YouTube. With the introduction of La Banda, the video reiterates the show's mechanics. A week later, video teasers of the four judges were shown on television one-by-one: Vice Ganda was shown first, followed by Sandara Park, and Yeng Constantino. The fourth judge was revealed to be Aga Muhlach, who made a comeback in ABS-CBN. A few days before the premiere, a trailer showing Simon Cowell promoting the show was released.

=== Host ===
The judges and host of Pinoy Boyband Superstar

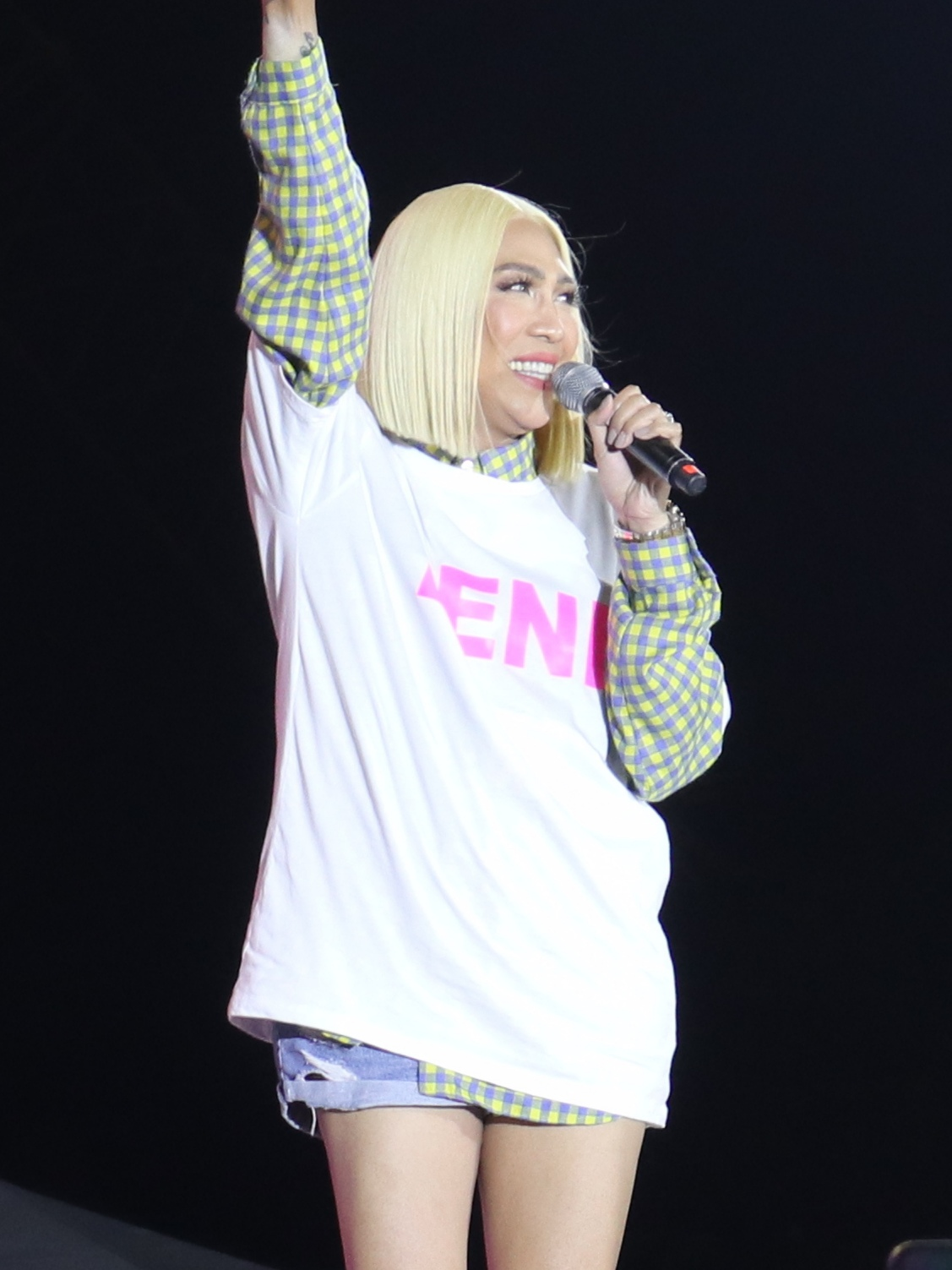
Vice Ganda

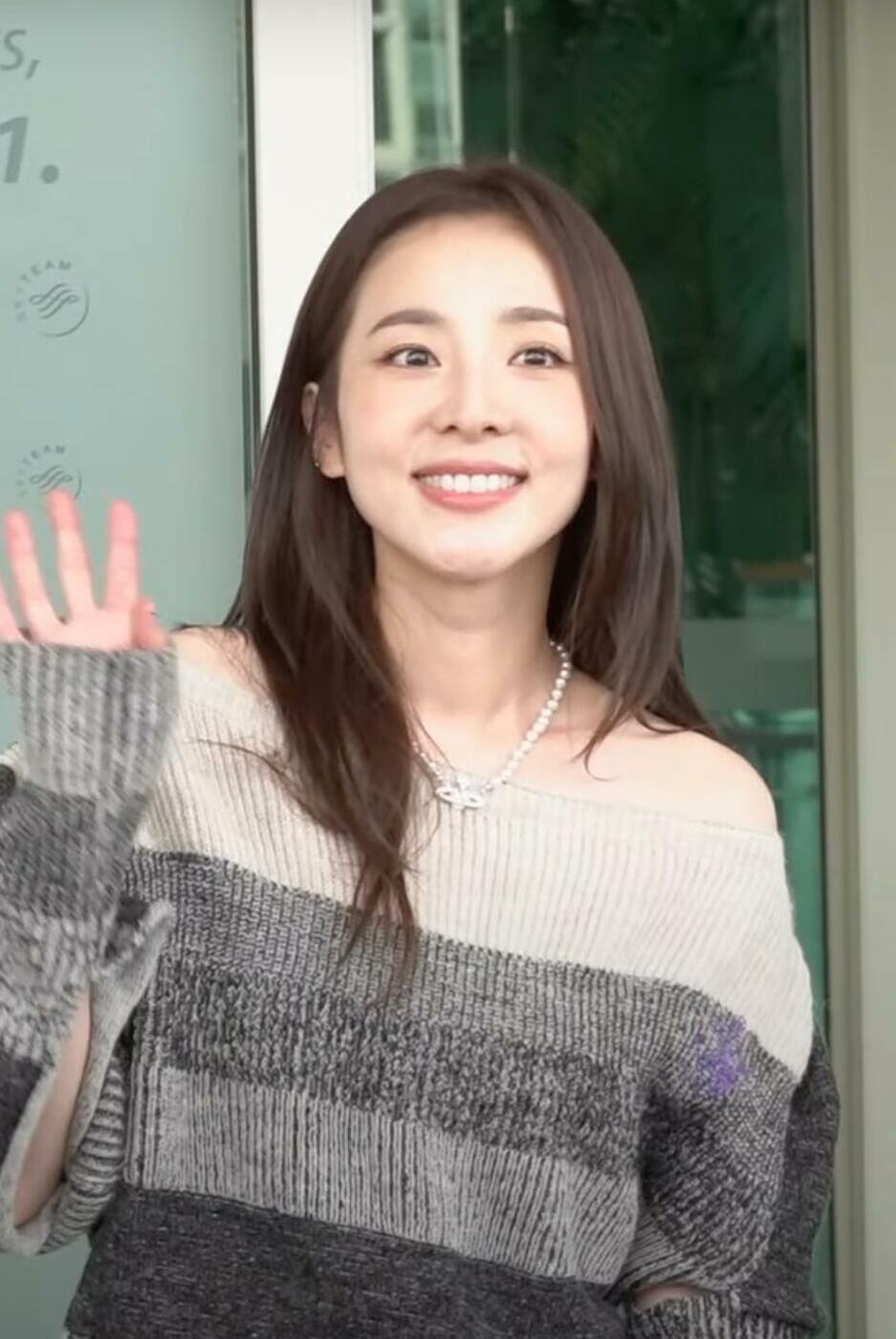
Sandara Park

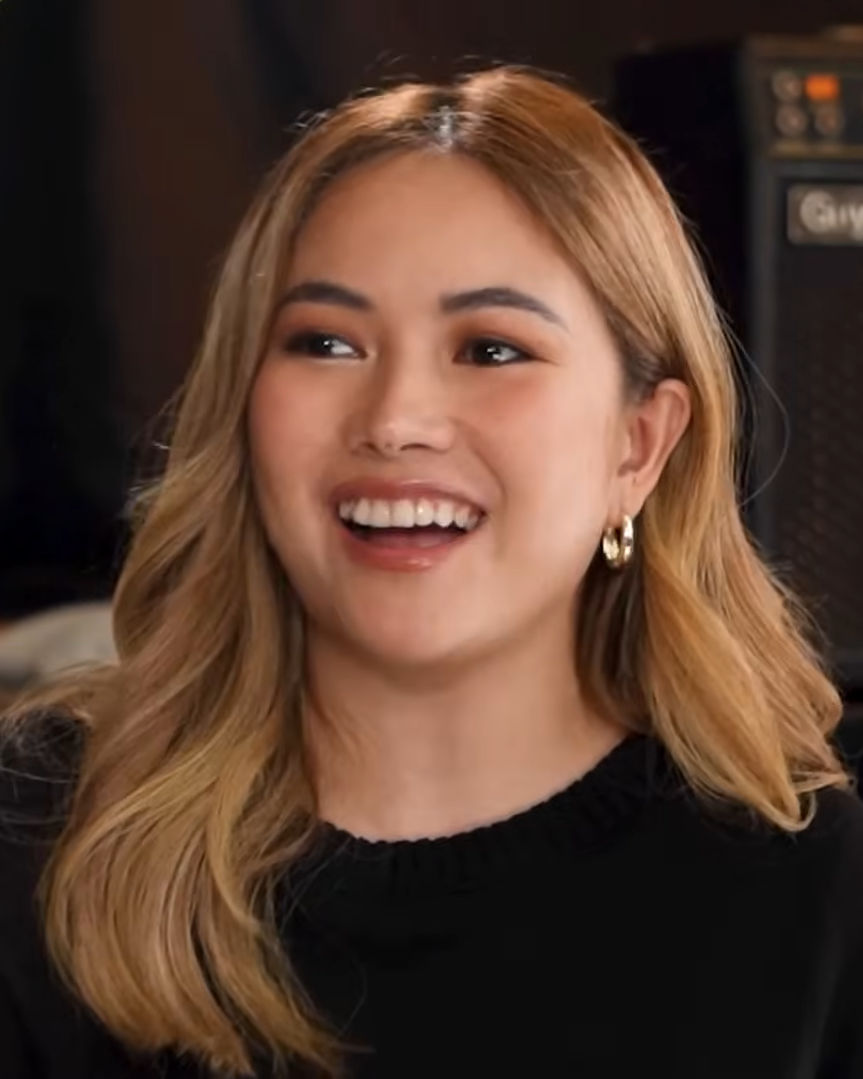
Yeng Constantino

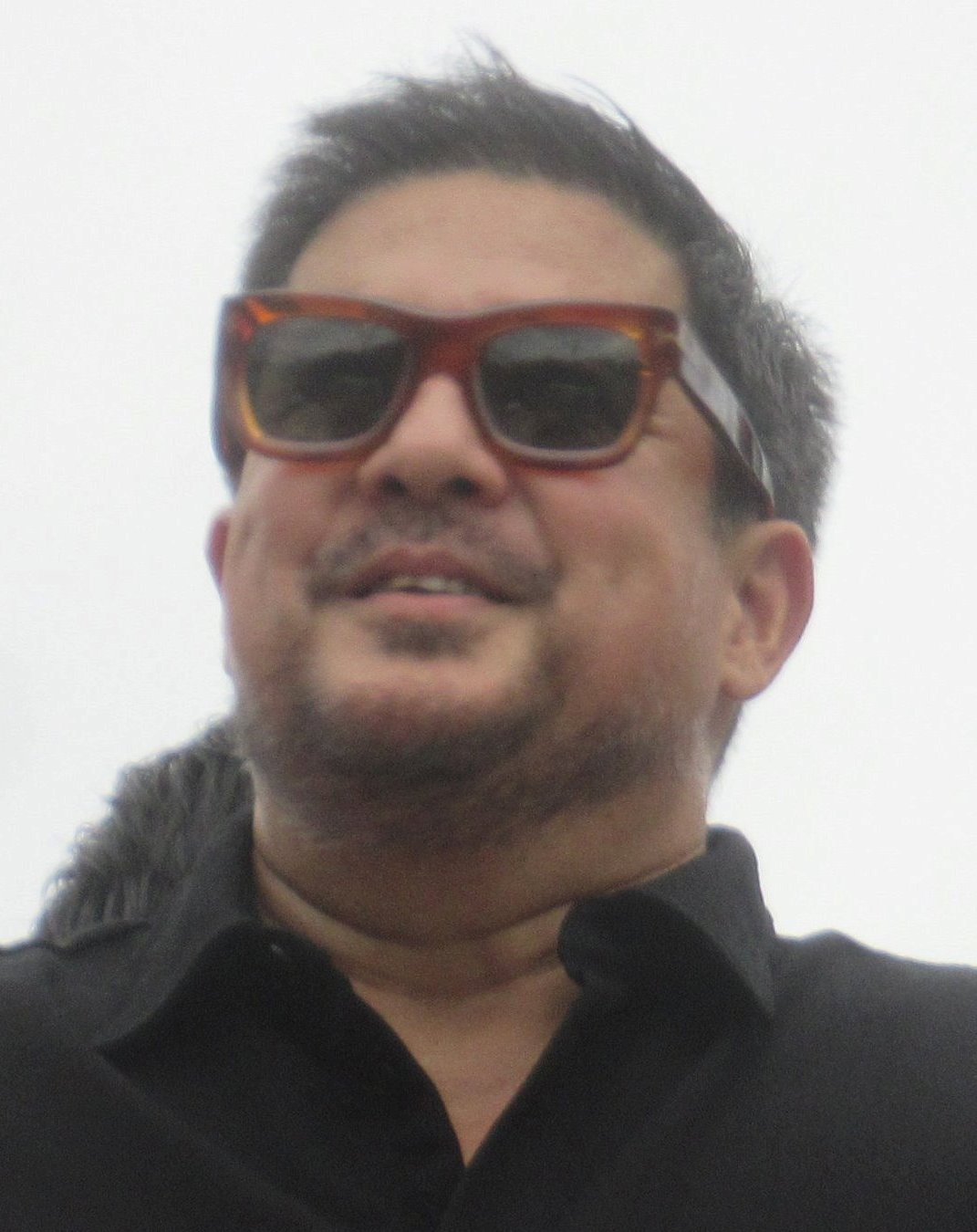
Aga Muhlach

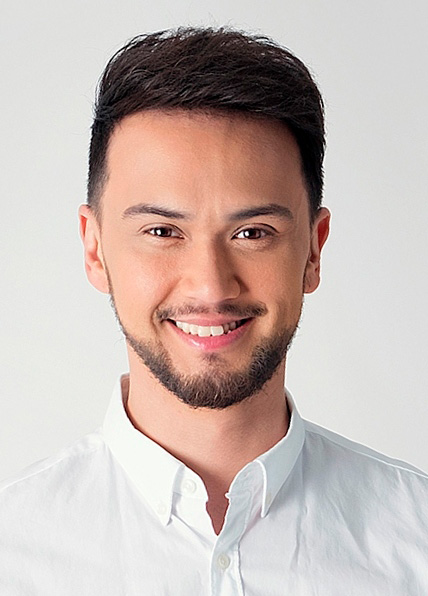
Billy Crawford

After signing his new contract with ABS-CBN, Billy Crawford was announced to host the talent show on August 16. As one of the in-demand hosts of the Philippine television today, he is set to host this show together with other television talent shows, including the Kids edition of Your Face Sounds Familiar, and the Philippine edition of Dancing With The Stars. Upon announcing his new stint, he said: "This is a new franchise and this is going to be wonderful and going to be exciting."

=== Judges ===
During the trade launch on June 28, Vice Ganda, Yeng Constantino, Aga Mulach and Sandara Park were announced to be judges for the then-upcoming talent show Pinoy Band Superstar. During this time, auditions were already ongoing. Since Park is living in South Korea, producers of the show went to the office of YG Entertainment, Park's agency, to do her video promo and photo shoot. On June 27, Star Cinema's AdProm director tweeted: "Sandara will be back!" and "Vice, Yeng and Sandara as judges!" with the hashtag #pinoyboybandsuperstar on both tweets, confirming Park's addition in the show. Star Cinema's Mico del Rosario also uploaded a short greeting of Park on Instagram as a teaser for the show. In the video, Park said, :"This is going to be exciting. See you, Kapamilya. Mahal ko kayo! (I love you all!)". Although she was occasionally seen guesting in some Philippine shows, this would be her regular television comeback after leaving for South Korea in 2007. She stated: "It is good to experience various things in various areas. I think those experiences will be a big help for me later. Philippines is a special place since I grew up here and people sent much love here."

The time Crawford was announced to host, he revealed the next judge will be formally announced on Thursday. According to him, the audience would be surprised as to who would be the next judge. Following Crawford's revelation, the fourth judge was announced to be actor Aga Muhlach two days later. He was reported to lose weight because he did not want to look like a father while being with the other judges.

=== Auditions ===
Locations where the open auditions were held

The open auditions for boys, 14 to 25 years old and can sing and groove were held in the following locations:

Date(s)	Venue	Location
June 10, 2016	Robinsons Place Pangasinan	Calasiao, Pangasinan
June 11–12, 2016	Starmall San Jose del Monte	San Jose del Monte, Bulacan
June 15–16, 2016	Centrio Mall	Cagayan de Oro, Misamis Oriental
June 17–18, 2016	KCC Mall de Zamboanga	Zamboanga City, Zamboanga del Sur
June 18–19, 2016	Starmall Alabang	Muntinlupa
June 22, 2016	KCC Mall of GenSan	General Santos, South Cotabato
June 24–25, 2016	Pacific Mall Legazpi	Legazpi, Albay
June 25–26, 2016	ABS-CBN Bacolod	Bacolod, Negros Occidental
June 25–26, 2016	Sierra Pines Hotel	Baguio, Benguet
July 16–17, 2016	Pacific Mall Mandaue	Mandaue, Cebu
July 23, 2016	Gaisano Mall of Toril	Davao City, Davao del Sur
July 24, 2016	Gaisano Mall of Davao	Davao City, Davao del Sur

The online and social network auditions were also announced which ran from July 27 to August 10, 2016.

=== Other content ===
Pinoy Boyband Superstar: Online airs their episodes on the official website and on their official YouTube channel hosted by IA and AI dela Cruz.

== Contestants ==
Color key

Winning contestant who joins the member of the Pinoy Boyband
Contestant eliminated in the Live Shows
Contestant eliminated in the Middle Rounds' Performance Night
Contestant eliminated in the Middle Rounds' Last Chance Performance Night

40 Contestants
Niel Murillo	Russell Reyes	Ford Valencia	Tristan Ramirez	Joao Constancia
Tony Labrusca	Mark Oblea	James Ryan Cesena	Allen Cecilio	Henz Villaraiz
Miko Juarez	Markus Paterson	Joshua Manio	Luigi D'Avola	Gabriel Umali
Isaiah Tiglao	Wilbert Rosalyn	Keanno dela Cruz	Raymond Mabute	Raynald Simon
Angelo Nabor	Jimsen Jison	Jindric Macapagal	Guion Antonio	Jayvee Mendoza Bjorn Mendoza
Aeiou Villanueva	Cyrill Tumamak	Kyle Dwight Sabinay	Jao Viola	Jester Hernandez
Kenith Pasco	Nhiko Sabiniano	Yuki Sakamoto	Bradyn Villanueva	Ethan Salvador
Jay Kim	Lucho Beech	Michael Diamse	Nico Nicolas	Sef Hynard

== Judges' Audition ==
Contestants travel from different parts of the Philippines: Luzon, Visayas and Mindanao, and from elsewhere in Asia, as well as from America and Europe to audition for the boyband competition. Before performing, the participants need to focus, to vocalize, to get rid of their tension because they will face the 500 girls. The girls will decide whether the contestant can enter the booth to audition for the judges. Each contestant needs to impress the girls through dancing, pick up lines and so on except singing. If they get 74% votes downward, the judges can override the girls' votes or may be it is the end of their journey but when they get 75% votes upward, they will proceed to the judges' booth and face the 4 superstar judges. In front of the judges, the contestant will perform his prepared song. He must get 3 or more yeses from the judges to pass to the next round.

Color key

✓	Judge said YES
✗	Judge said NO
	Contestant eliminated with below 75% approval rate from all-girl audience
	Contestant lost the judges' vote
	Judge override the all-girl audience's approval rate

=== Episode 1 (September 10) ===
Order	Contestant	Age	Hometown	All-Girl Audience's Approval Rate	Judge's Votes / Override			
Order	Contestant	Age	Hometown	All-Girl Audience's Approval Rate	Aga	Yeng	Dara	Vice
1	Allen Cecilio	17	Caloocan	98%	✓	✓	✓	✓
2	Alfonso Avila	19	Parañaque City	68%	–	–	–	–
3	Ford Valencia	21	Valenzuela City	83%	✓	✓	✓	✗
4	Jormiel Labador	25	Bulacan	77%	✗	✓	✗	✗
5	Niel Murillo	17	Cebu City	96%	✓	✓	✓	✓

=== Episode 2 (September 11) ===
Order	Contestant	Age	Hometown	All-Girl Audience's Approval Rate	Judge's Votes / Override			
Order	Contestant	Age	Hometown	All-Girl Audience's Approval Rate	Aga	Yeng	Dara	Vice
1	Tonio Banach	15	Cebu City	89%	✓	✓	✗	✗
2	Markus Paterson	18	Pangasinan	92%	✓	✓	✓	✓
3	Miggy Campbell	24	Antipolo	70%	–	–	–	–
4	Keanno dela Cruz	15	Pampanga	72%	✓	✓	✓	✗
5	Jayvee Mendoza Bjorn Mendoza	22	Batangas	95%	✓	✓	✓	✓

=== Episode 3 (September 17) ===
Order	Contestant	Age	Hometown	All-Girl Audience's Approval Rate	Judge's Votes / Override			
Order	Contestant	Age	Hometown	All-Girl Audience's Approval Rate	Aga	Yeng	Dara	Vice
1	Joao Constancia	19	Macau, China	94%	✓	✓	✓	✓
2	Gabriel Umali	16	Quezon City	94%	✓	✓	✓	✓
3	Mike Villamor	18	Antipolo	81%	✗	✓	✗	✗
4	Rollo Espinos	23	Bacolod	73%	–	–	–	–
5	Kokoy De Santos	18	Cavite	73%	–	–	–	–
6	Wilbert Rosalyn	19	Davao del Sur	95%	✓	✓	✓	✓

=== Episode 4 (September 18) ===
Order	Contestant	Age	Hometown	All-Girl Audience's Approval Rate	Judge's Votes / Override			
Order	Contestant	Age	Hometown	All-Girl Audience's Approval Rate	Aga	Yeng	Dara	Vice
1	Jay Kim	20	Manila	79%	✓	✓	✓	✓
2	Sean Cruz	18	Pampanga	72%	–	–	–	–
3	James Ryan Cesena	17	California, USA	90%	✓	✓	✓	✗
4	Miko Juarez	20	Canada	97%	✓	✓	✓	✓
5	Mark Oblea	21	Cavite	84%	✓	✓	✓	✓

=== Episode 5 (September 24) ===
Order	Contestant	Age	Hometown	All-Girl Audience's Approval Rate	Judge's Votes / Override			
Order	Contestant	Age	Hometown	All-Girl Audience's Approval Rate	Aga	Yeng	Dara	Vice
1	Raymond Mabute	20	Quezon City	94%	✓	✓	✓	✓
2	Nico Nicolas	20	Manila	95%	✓	✓	✓	✗
3	Sef Hynard	24	Pasig	94%	✓	✓	✓	✓
4	Jead Ramirez	19	Olongapo City	55%	✗	✗	✗	✗

=== Episode 6 (September 25) ===
Order	Contestant	Age	Hometown	All-Girl Audience's Approval Rate	Judge's Votes / Override			
Order	Contestant	Age	Hometown	All-Girl Audience's Approval Rate	Aga	Yeng	Dara	Vice
1	Jindric Macapagal	21	Cebu	95%	✓	✓	✓	✓
2	Ralph Gica	21	Cebu	86%	✗	✓	✗	✓
3	Michael Diamse	22	Davao	94%	✓	✓	✓	✓
4	Alfonso Vivar	18	Quezon City	77%	✗	✗	✗	✗
5	Aeiou Villanueva	21	Quezon City	81%	✓	✓	✓	✓

=== Episode 7 (October 1) ===
Order	Contestant	Age	Hometown	All-Girl Audience's Approval Rate	Judge's Votes / Override			
Order	Contestant	Age	Hometown	All-Girl Audience's Approval Rate	Aga	Yeng	Dara	Vice
1	Henz Villaraiz	19	Taguig	85%	✓	✓	✓	✗
2	Alexis Mancenido	20	Davao	70%	–	–	–	–
3	Joshua Manio	20	Olongapo City	75%	✓	✓	✓	✓
4	Nhiko Sabiniano	16	Marikina	80%	✓	✓	✓	✗
5	Tony Labrusca	21	Pasig	98%	✓	✓	✓	✓

=== Episode 8 (October 2) ===
Order	Contestant	Age	Hometown	All-Girl Audience's Approval Rate	Judge's Votes / Override			
Order	Contestant	Age	Hometown	All-Girl Audience's Approval Rate	Aga	Yeng	Dara	Vice
1	Yuki Sakamoto	25	Quezon City	96%	✓	✓	✓	✓
2	Keirt Aivan Sabinay	19	Cebu	95%	✗	✓	✗	✓
2	Kyle Dwight Sabinay	17	Cebu	95%	✓	✓	✗	✓
3	Isaiah Tiglao	14	Bulacan	94%	✓	✓	✓	✓
4	Thomas "Tim" Feller	17	Pampanga	75%	✗	✗	✗	✗
5	Russell Reyes	17	Chicago, Illinois	80%	✓	✓	✓	✓

=== Episode 9 (October 8) ===
Order	Contestant	Age	Hometown	All-Girl Audience's Approval Rate	Judge's Votes / Override			
Order	Contestant	Age	Hometown	All-Girl Audience's Approval Rate	Aga	Yeng	Dara	Vice
1	Luigi D'Avola	21	Cebu	96%	✓	✓	✓	✗
2	Michael Lopes	22	Sweden	87%	✗	✗	✗	✗
3	Cyrill Tumamak	14	Parañaque	74%	✓	✓	✓	✓
4	Tristan Ramirez	23	Bulacan	90%	✓	✓	✓	✓

=== Episode 10 (October 9) ===
Order	Contestant	Age	Hometown	All-Girl Audience's Approval Rate	Judge's Votes / Override			
Order	Contestant	Age	Hometown	All-Girl Audience's Approval Rate	Aga	Yeng	Dara	Vice
1	Kenith Pasco	19	Davao City	61%	✓	✓	✓	✗
2	Allen Abrenica	17	Batangas City	89%	✗	✗	✗	✗
3	Jimsen Jison	20	Marikina	96%	✓	✓	✓	✓
4	Angelo Sison	21	Muntinlupa	84%	✓	✗	✗	✓
5	Jao Viola	22	Malabon	96%	✓	✓	✓	✗

=== Episode 11 (October 15) ===
Order	Contestant	Age	Hometown	All-Girl Audience's Approval Rate	Judge's Votes / Override			
Order	Contestant	Age	Hometown	All-Girl Audience's Approval Rate	Aga	Yeng	Dara	Vice
1	Jester Hernandez	19	Quezon City	90%	✓	✓	✓	✗
2	Michael Hogan	18	Quezon City	76%	✗	✓	✓	✗
3	Ralph Victorino	17	Bulacan	73%	✗	✗	✗	✗
4	Guion Antonio	21	Baguio	91%	✓	✓	✓	✗
5	Ethan Salvador	19	Quezon City	88%	✓	✓	✓	✗
6	Julijo Pisk	15	Cavite	75%	✓	✗	✗	✗
7	Bradyn Villanueva	16	San Diego, California	77%	✓	✓	✓	✗

=== Episode 12 (October 16) ===
Order	Contestant	Age	Hometown	All-Girl Audience's Approval Rate	Judge's Votes / Override			
Order	Contestant	Age	Hometown	All-Girl Audience's Approval Rate	Aga	Yeng	Dara	Vice
1	Angelo Nabor	21	Pampanga	89%	✓	✓	✓	✓
2	Lucho Beech	19	Makati City	81%	X	✓	✓	✓
2	Joelo Beech	21	Makati City	81%	✗	✗	✗	✗
3	Aaron Saguin	21	Cavite	78%	✗	✗	✗	✗
4	Raynald Simon	18	Sta. Rosa, Laguna	73%	✓	✓	✓	✓

== Middle Rounds ==
From 40 contestants who passed the auditions, the judges choose the top 20 boys with the best combination of charm, personality and knowledge of singing. They group the top 20 boys into 4 boybands with 5 members each, and a 5th boyband which comes from 5 members of the bottom 20 boys. 5 boybands will perform in front of the judges and the girls wherein they will choose who will be in the top 12 that will perform in the "Live Shows."

=== Judges' Deliberation ===
The judges unanimously decided who are going to be part of the top 20 except for a few contestants.

Some of the contestants were given an assignment by the judges and it is to study the Filipino language to sing the OPM songs which is important in a Pinoy boyband. So during the deliberations, the judges decided to determine the results of the challenge provided to them.

James Ryan Cesena, Sef Hynard and Russell Reyes were requested by the judges to perform on stage and sing an OPM song.

Episode	Order	Contestant	Song
Episode 13 (Saturday, October 22)	1	Russell Reyes	"Kung Ako Na Lang Sana"
Episode 13 (Saturday, October 22)	2	James Ryan Cesena	"Hallelujah"
Episode 13 (Saturday, October 22)	3	Sef Hynard	"Walang Iba"

After the judges heard the Tagalog performances of Russell, James and Sef, the top 20 boys were completed.

At the end of the deliberation, the judges formed from top 20 boys into 4 groups with 5 members each who are to sing in the Middle Rounds' Performance Night. The groups will perform in ballad, acoustic, pop and R&B genres. While the 5th group will be the chosen 5 of bottom 20 who will also perform the upbeat genre.

==== Announcement ====
Color key

Contestant made it to the top 20
Contestant belonged to the bottom 20

Order	Contestants				
1	Joshua Manio	Joao Constancia	Henz Villaraiz	Mark Oblea	Luigi D'Avola
2	Gabriel Umali	Markus Paterson	Isaiah Tiglao	Wilbert Rosalyn	Russell Reyes
3	Yuki Sakamoto	Jayvee Mendoza Bjorn Mendoza	Jao Viola	Aeiou Villanueva	Jester Hernandez
4	Nico Nicolas	Ethan Salvador	Michael Diamse	Bradyn Villanueva	Tristan Ramirez
5	Niel Murillo	Allen Cecilio	Keanno dela Cruz	Raymond Mabute	Raynald Simon
6	Kenith Pasco	Nhiko Sabiniano	Guion Antonio	Kyle Dwight Sabinay	Cyrill Tumamak
7	Angelo Nabor	Tony Labrusca	Jimsen Jison	Ford Valencia	Jindric Macapagal
8	Lucho Beech	Miko Juarez	James Ryan Cesena	Sef Hynard	Jay Kim

The top 20 grouped into 4 of 5 contestants who will perform on the "Middle Rounds' Performance Night."

Top 20
Group 1	Group 2	Group 3	Group 4
Joshua Manio; Joao Constancia; Henz Villaraiz; Mark Oblea; Luigi D'Avola	Gabriel Umali; Markus Paterson; Isaiah Tiglao; Wilbert Rosalyn; Russell Reyes	Niel Murillo; Allen Cecilio; Keanno dela Cruz; Raymond Mabute; Raynald Simon	Angelo Nabor; Tony Labrusca; Jimsen Jison; Ford Valencia; Jindric Macapagal

=== Last Chance Performance Night ===
The judges divide the remaining 20 into 2 groups and each group is required to perform a boyband hit. They give 24 hours to rehearse the song. This is the last chance to perform in front of the judges and the girls. But still the judges will select the 5th group.

Color key

Contestant selected by the judges
Contestant was eliminated

Episode	Order	Group	Contestants	Song
Episode 14 (Sunday, October 23)	1	Group 1	Aeiou Villanueva	"Quit Playing Games (with My Heart)"
Episode 14 (Sunday, October 23)	1	Group 1	Jayvee Mendoza & Bjorn Mendoza	"Quit Playing Games (with My Heart)"
Episode 14 (Sunday, October 23)	1	Group 1	Cyrill Tumamak	"Quit Playing Games (with My Heart)"
Episode 14 (Sunday, October 23)	1	Group 1	Kyle Dwight Sabinay	"Quit Playing Games (with My Heart)"
Episode 14 (Sunday, October 23)	1	Group 1	Guion Antonio	"Quit Playing Games (with My Heart)"
Episode 14 (Sunday, October 23)	1	Group 1	Jao Viola	"Quit Playing Games (with My Heart)"
Episode 14 (Sunday, October 23)	1	Group 1	Jester Hernandez	"Quit Playing Games (with My Heart)"
Episode 14 (Sunday, October 23)	1	Group 1	Kenith Pasco	"Quit Playing Games (with My Heart)"
Episode 14 (Sunday, October 23)	1	Group 1	Nhiko Sabiniano	"Quit Playing Games (with My Heart)"
Episode 14 (Sunday, October 23)	1	Group 1	Yuki Sakamoto	"Quit Playing Games (with My Heart)"
Episode 14 (Sunday, October 23)	2	Group 2	Bradyn Villanueva	"As Long as You Love Me"
Episode 14 (Sunday, October 23)	2	Group 2	Ethan Salvador	"As Long as You Love Me"
Episode 14 (Sunday, October 23)	2	Group 2	James Ryan Cesena	"As Long as You Love Me"
Episode 14 (Sunday, October 23)	2	Group 2	Jay Kim	"As Long as You Love Me"
Episode 14 (Sunday, October 23)	2	Group 2	Lucho Beech	"As Long as You Love Me"
Episode 14 (Sunday, October 23)	2	Group 2	Michael Diamse	"As Long as You Love Me"
Episode 14 (Sunday, October 23)	2	Group 2	Miko Juarez	"As Long as You Love Me"
Episode 14 (Sunday, October 23)	2	Group 2	Nico Nicolas	"As Long as You Love Me"
Episode 14 (Sunday, October 23)	2	Group 2	Sef Hynard	"As Long as You Love Me"
Episode 14 (Sunday, October 23)	2	Group 2	Tristan Ramirez	"As Long as You Love Me"

The contestants of the 5th group who will perform on the "Middle Rounds' Performance Night."

Group 5
Miko Juarez	Tristan Ramirez	Jayvee Mendoza & Bjorn Mendoza	Guion Antonio	James Ryan Cesena

=== Performance Night ===
5 groups with 5 members each will perform. Each group will perform a boyband hit assigned to them: a ballad, a pop song, acoustic, upbeat and of course R&B. They will perform as a group but each contestant will be judged individually. In this round, they will perform with their group mates. At the same time, they will use their charm, personality and talent. From 25 contestants, the top 12 will advance to the next round: 3 boys from the girl fans' votes while 9 boys will be chosen by the judges.

Color key

Contestant voted by the girl fans
Contestant chosen by the judges
Contestant was eliminated

Episode	Order	Group	Contestants	Vocal Coach	Genre	Song
Episode 15 (Saturday, October 29)	1	Group 1	Henz Villaraiz	Belinda "Lindie" Achacoso	Acoustic	"Sukob Na"
Episode 15 (Saturday, October 29)	1	Group 1	Joshua Manio	Belinda "Lindie" Achacoso	Acoustic	"Sukob Na"
Episode 15 (Saturday, October 29)	1	Group 1	Luigi D'Avola	Belinda "Lindie" Achacoso	Acoustic	"Sukob Na"
Episode 15 (Saturday, October 29)	1	Group 1	Mark Oblea	Belinda "Lindie" Achacoso	Acoustic	"Sukob Na"
Episode 15 (Saturday, October 29)	1	Group 1	Joao Constancia	Belinda "Lindie" Achacoso	Acoustic	"Sukob Na"
Episode 15 (Saturday, October 29)	2	Group 2	Gabriel Umali	Eugene Cailao	R&B	"This I Promise You"
Episode 15 (Saturday, October 29)	2	Group 2	Isaiah Tiglao	Eugene Cailao	R&B	"This I Promise You"
Episode 15 (Saturday, October 29)	2	Group 2	Markus Paterson	Eugene Cailao	R&B	"This I Promise You"
Episode 15 (Saturday, October 29)	2	Group 2	Wilbert Rosalyn	Eugene Cailao	R&B	"This I Promise You"
Episode 15 (Saturday, October 29)	2	Group 2	Russell Reyes	Eugene Cailao	R&B	"This I Promise You"
Episode 15 (Saturday, October 29)	3	Group 3	Allen Cecilio	Sammy Gaddi	Pop	"Love Me for a Reason"
Episode 15 (Saturday, October 29)	3	Group 3	Keanno dela Cruz	Sammy Gaddi	Pop	"Love Me for a Reason"
Episode 15 (Saturday, October 29)	3	Group 3	Raymond Mabute	Sammy Gaddi	Pop	"Love Me for a Reason"
Episode 15 (Saturday, October 29)	3	Group 3	Raynald Simon	Sammy Gaddi	Pop	"Love Me for a Reason"
Episode 15 (Saturday, October 29)	3	Group 3	Niel Murillo	Sammy Gaddi	Pop	"Love Me for a Reason"
Episode 16 (Sunday, October 30)	1	Group 4	Angelo Nabor	Thor	Ballad	"Nanghihinayang"
Episode 16 (Sunday, October 30)	1	Group 4	Ford Valencia	Thor	Ballad	"Nanghihinayang"
Episode 16 (Sunday, October 30)	1	Group 4	Jimsen Jison	Thor	Ballad	"Nanghihinayang"
Episode 16 (Sunday, October 30)	1	Group 4	Jindric Macapagal	Thor	Ballad	"Nanghihinayang"
Episode 16 (Sunday, October 30)	1	Group 4	Tony Labrusca	Thor	Ballad	"Nanghihinayang"
Episode 16 (Sunday, October 30)	2	Group 5	Guion Antonio	Annie Quintos	Upbeat	"Uptown Girl"
Episode 16 (Sunday, October 30)	2	Group 5	James Ryan Cesena	Annie Quintos	Upbeat	"Uptown Girl"
Episode 16 (Sunday, October 30)	2	Group 5	Miko Juarez	Annie Quintos	Upbeat	"Uptown Girl"
Episode 16 (Sunday, October 30)	2	Group 5	Tristan Ramirez	Annie Quintos	Upbeat	"Uptown Girl"
Episode 16 (Sunday, October 30)	2	Group 5	Jayvee Mendoza & Bjorn Mendoza	Annie Quintos	Upbeat	"Uptown Girl"

The top 3 contestants voted by the girl fans.

Group	Contestant	Votes Percentage
Group 1	Joao Constancia	42.97%
Group 3	Allen Cecilio	25.61%
Group 3	Niel Murillo	23.14%

== Live Shows ==
In order to form a final group of five, a selection process is used to eliminate participants. During the judges' selection process, one participant is eliminated every week until there are only seven remaining. From these seven, five are chosen to form the first "superstar-boyband" for the country.

The superstar judges select the strongest and the weakest group. The strongest group will be declared as the boyband of the week. While the members of the weakest group would have to individually sing their survival songs. Aside from the talent, the young heartthrobs will be judge in their overall character and performance onstage.

One or two will be saved by the votes of the viewing public. One will be saved by the superstar judges. In case of a tie, the next highest number of public votes will be saved. And the remaining contestant will be eliminated from the competition.

Color key

Group announced as boyband of the week / Contestant announced as a member of boyband of the week
Group announced as the weakest group / Contestant announced as the weakest in the group
Contestant was saved by the public votes
Contestant was saved by the judges
Contestant was eliminated

=== Week 1: Top 12 (November 5 and 6) ===
==== Group Performances ====
The top 12 cast lots to determine who will form the 4 groups with 3 members each.

Episode	Order	Group	Song
Episode 17 (Saturday, November 5)	1	Ford Valencia; James Ryan Cesena; Joao Constancia	"Picture of You"
Episode 17 (Saturday, November 5)	2	Henz Villaraiz; Markus Paterson; Niel Murillo	"I Want It That Way"
Episode 17 (Saturday, November 5)	3	Mark Oblea; Tony Labrusca; Tristan Ramirez	"Because of You"
Episode 17 (Saturday, November 5)	4	Allen Cecilio; Miko Juarez; Russell Reyes	"Tearin' Up My Heart"

==== Individual Performances ====
Episode	Order	Contestant	Song
Episode 18 (Sunday, November 6)	1	Henz Villaraiz	"Liwanag Sa Dilim"
Episode 18 (Sunday, November 6)	2	Niel Murillo	"I Lay My Love on You"
Episode 18 (Sunday, November 6)	3	Markus Paterson	"Stay with Me"

==== Non-Competition Performance ====
Order	Performer	Song
18.1	Boyband of the Week (Ford Valencia, James Ryan Cesena and Joao Constancia)	"What Makes You Beautiful"

=== Week 2: Top 11 (November 12 and 13) ===
==== Group Performances ====
The boys were divided into three groups: two 4-member and one 3-member groups and their challenge is to sing the OPM hits.

Episode	Order	Group	Song
Episode 19 (Saturday, November 12)	1	Joao Constancia; Niel Murillo; Russell Reyes; Tony Labrusca	"Dahil Mahal Kita"
Episode 19 (Saturday, November 12)	2	Henz Villaraiz; James Ryan Cesena; Mark Oblea; Miko Juarez	"Ako'y Iyong-Iyo"
Episode 19 (Saturday, November 12)	3	Allen Cecilio; Ford Valencia; Tristan Ramirez	"Bakit Labis Kitang Mahal"

==== Individual Performances ====
Two contestants with the highest number of public votes will be saved.

Episode	Order	Contestant	Song
Episode 20 (Sunday, November 13)	1	Mark Oblea	"The Time of My Life"
Episode 20 (Sunday, November 13)	2	Miko Juarez	"This Time"
Episode 20 (Sunday, November 13)	3	Henz Villaraiz	"25 Minutes"
Episode 20 (Sunday, November 13)	4	James Ryan Cesena	"Say Something"

==== Non-Competition Performance ====
Order	Performer	Song
20.1	Boyband of the Week (Joao Constancia, Niel Murillo, Russell Reyes and Tony Labrusca)	"Kasayaw"

=== Week 3: Top 10 (November 19 and 20) ===
==== Group Performances ====
Episode	Order	Group	Song
Episode 21 (Saturday, November 19)	1	Allen Cecilio	"Best Song Ever"
Episode 21 (Saturday, November 19)	1	Niel Murillo	"Best Song Ever"
Episode 21 (Saturday, November 19)	1	James Ryan Cesena	"Best Song Ever"
Episode 21 (Saturday, November 19)	2	Henz Villaraiz	"One Thing"
Episode 21 (Saturday, November 19)	2	Russell Reyes	"One Thing"
Episode 21 (Saturday, November 19)	2	Tony Labrusca	"One Thing"
Episode 21 (Saturday, November 19)	3	Ford Valencia	"Hanggang Kailan (Umuwi Ka Na Baby)"
Episode 21 (Saturday, November 19)	3	Joao Constancia	"Hanggang Kailan (Umuwi Ka Na Baby)"
Episode 21 (Saturday, November 19)	3	Mark Oblea	"Hanggang Kailan (Umuwi Ka Na Baby)"
Episode 21 (Saturday, November 19)	3	Tristan Ramirez	"Hanggang Kailan (Umuwi Ka Na Baby)"

==== Individual Performances ====
Episode	Order	Contestant	Song
Episode 22 (Sunday, November 20)	1	Ford Valencia	"Angels Cry"
Episode 22 (Sunday, November 20)	2	Henz Villaraiz	"Ang Huling El Bimbo"
Episode 22 (Sunday, November 20)	3	Allen Cecilio	"Hinahanap-hanap Kita"

==== Non-Competition Performance ====
Order	Performer	Song
22.1	Boyband of the Week (James Ryan Cesena, Joao Constancia, Mark Oblea, Niel Murillo, Russell Reyes, Tony Labrusca and Tristan Ramirez)	"Boys Do Fall in Love"

=== Week 4: Top 9 (November 26 and 27) ===
==== Group Performances ====
Episode	Order	Group	Song
Episode 23 (Saturday, November 26)	1	Allen Cecilio	"Gusto Kita"
Episode 23 (Saturday, November 26)	1	Mark Oblea	"Gusto Kita"
Episode 23 (Saturday, November 26)	1	Tony Labrusca	"Gusto Kita"
Episode 23 (Saturday, November 26)	2	Ford Valencia	"I Swear"
Episode 23 (Saturday, November 26)	2	Niel Murillo	"I Swear"
Episode 23 (Saturday, November 26)	2	Russell Reyes	"I Swear"
Episode 23 (Saturday, November 26)	3	James Ryan Cesena	"Rude"
Episode 23 (Saturday, November 26)	3	Joao Constancia	"Rude"
Episode 23 (Saturday, November 26)	3	Tristan Ramirez	"Rude"

==== Individual Performances ====
Episode	Order	Contestant	Song
Episode 24 (Sunday, November 27)	1	Russell Reyes	"Bakit Pa Ba"
Episode 24 (Sunday, November 27)	2	James Ryan Cesena	"Just the Way You Are"
Episode 24 (Sunday, November 27)	3	Allen Cecilio	"Kumusta Ka"

==== Non-Competition Performance ====
Order	Performer	Song
24.1	Boyband of the Week (Ford Valencia, Joao Constancia, Mark Oblea, Niel Murillo, Tony Labrusca and Tristan Ramirez)	"Nasa Iyo Na Ang Lahat"

=== Week 5: Top 8 (December 3 and 4) ===
==== Sudden Death Challenge ====
Episode	Order	Winner	Loser	Song
Episode 25 (Saturday, December 3)	1	Joao Constancia	Tristan Ramirez	"What Do You Mean?"
Episode 25 (Saturday, December 3)	2	Russell Reyes	James Ryan Cesena	"I Don't Wanna Miss A Thing"
Episode 25 (Saturday, December 3)	3	Niel Murillo	Ford Valencia	"So Sick""
Episode 25 (Saturday, December 3)	4	Mark Oblea	Tony Labrusca	"You'll Be Safe Here"

==== Individual Performances ====
Two contestants with the highest number of public votes will be saved.

Episode	Order	Contestant	Song
Episode 26 (Sunday, December 4)	1	Tristan Ramirez (Note: Tristan has been passed to the Grand Final (via public vote) had he tied with James in Judges' vote.)	"Knocks Me Off My Feet"
Episode 26 (Sunday, December 4)	2	Tony Labrusca	"Pagkat Mahal Kita"
Episode 26 (Sunday, December 4)	3	James Ryan Cesena	"Sunday Morning"
Episode 26 (Sunday, December 4)	4	Ford Valencia	"I'm Not the Only One"

==== Non-Competition Performance ====
Order	Performer	Song
26.1	Vice Ganda feat. Boyband of the Week (Joao Constancia, Russell Reyes, Mark Oblea, Niel Murillo)	"Ang Kulit"

== The Grand Reveal ==
They will perform in 3 groups consists of 2 duos and 1 trio. Seven remaining heartthrobs are left in the grand finals to prove to the judges and the public that they deserve a spot on the Superstar Boyband. And from the seven, five boyband aspirants will be chosen to form the first superstar boyband of the country will be named as "BoybandPH".

The superstar judges will give individual scores based on the performances of the grand finalists, it will be combined to make the half of the criteria completed. The other half of the criteria is done by public voting thru text and google votes.

One grand finalists will be named Saturday night as part of the Superstar Boyband, and four other members will be named Sunday night. And the remaining 2 grand finalists will not be mentioned will be eliminated from the competition and occasionally didn't make it to the Boyband.

Color key

Winning contestant who joins the member of the Pinoy Boyband
Contestant was failed to make it to the Pinoy Boyband and yet eliminated from the competition

=== Finals Week: Top 7 (December 10) ===
==== Group Performances ====
The top 7 formed in 3 groups consists of 2 duos and 1 trio. This will not be judge as a group overall to pick the weakest and strongest group. Each grand finalists will be scored individually.

Episode	Order	Group	Song
Episode 27 (Saturday, December 10)	1	Ford Valencia; Joao Constancia; Mark Oblea	"Bailamos"
Episode 27 (Saturday, December 10)	2	Niel Murillo; Russell Reyes	"Cold Water"
Episode 27 (Saturday, December 10)	3	Tony Labrusca; Tristan Ramirez	"Treasure"

Niel Murillo garnered a total of 98.63% of the combined judges scores and public votes declaring him the first member of BoybandPH.

==== Non-competition Performance ====
Order	Performer	Song
27.1	Dara feat. Pinoy Boyband Superstar Top 7 (Niel Murillo, Russell Reyes, Ford Valencia, Tristan Ramirez, Joao Constancia, Tony Labrusca and Mark Oblea)	"Kiss"
27.2	Niel Murillo	"I Won't Give Up"

=== Finals Week: Top 6 (December 11) ===
==== Individual Performances ====
The top 6 remaining grand finalists will prove once again to the judges and the public for the very last time that they deserved to be a member of the BoybandPH. On the other hand, the voting percentages are all revert to zero. The 6 remaining grand finalists will battle it out for the last 4 coveted spots to make it to the Superstar Boyband.

Episode	Order	Contestant	Song
Episode 28 (Sunday, December 11)	1	Joao Constancia	"Twerk It Like Miley"
Episode 28 (Sunday, December 11)	2	Tony Labrusca	"Kulang Ako Kung Wala Ka"
Episode 28 (Sunday, December 11)	3	Ford Valencia	"Without You"
Episode 28 (Sunday, December 11)	4	Mark Oblea	"Mangarap Ka"
Episode 28 (Sunday, December 11)	5	Tristan Ramirez	"Can't Stop the Feeling!"
Episode 28 (Sunday, December 11)	6	Russell Reyes	"All I Ask"

Russell Reyes, Ford Valencia, Tristan Ramirez and Joao Constancia announced as the other 4 members of the Superstar Boyband. They emerged as the winners of the competition aside Niel Murillo to form the Superstar Boyband called "BoybandPH".

==== Non-competition Performance ====
Order	Performer	Song
28.1	Ogie Alcasid	"Sumayaw Sumunod / What Do You Mean?"

==== Winning Performance ====
Order	Performer	Song
29	Boyband PH (Niel Murillo, Russell Reyes, Ford Valencia, Tristan Ramirez and Joao Constancia)	"We Made It"

BoybandPH release their first single entitled "We Made It" written by Kiko Salazar and is yet to be released digitally later this year and its produced by Star Music.

== Elimination Chart ==
Color key

Winning contestant who joins the member of the Pinoy Boyband
Contestant in the strongest group or strongest contestant in the group and announced as safe
Contestant announced as safe
Contestant in the weakest group or weakest contestant in the group and was saved by the public votes
Contestant in the weakest group or weakest contestant in the group and was saved by the judges
Contestant in the weakest group or weakest contestant in the group and was eliminated

Live show results per week
Contestant		Week 1	Week 2	Week 3	Week 4	Week 5	The Grand Reveal
Niel Murillo		Safe	Safe	Safe	Safe	Safe	First Member
Russell Reyes		Safe	Safe	Safe	Safe	Safe	Second Member
Ford Valencia		Safe	Safe	Safe	Safe	Safe	Third Member
Tristan Ramirez		Safe	Safe	Safe	Safe	Safe	Fourth Member
Joao Constancia		Safe	Safe	Safe	Safe	Safe	Fifth Member
Tony Labrusca		Safe	Safe	Safe	Safe	Safe	Eliminated
Mark Oblea		Safe	Safe	Safe	Safe	Safe	Eliminated
James Ryan Cesena		Safe	Safe	Safe	Safe	Eliminated	Eliminated (Week 5)
Allen Cecilio		Safe	Safe	Safe	Eliminated	Eliminated (Week 4)	
Henz Villaraiz		Safe	Safe	Eliminated	Eliminated (Week 3)		
Miko Juarez		Safe	Eliminated	Eliminated (Week 2)			
Markus Paterson		Eliminated	Eliminated (Week 1)				
Public Votes Percentage (Text and Google votes)		Niel Murillo; 56.09% Markus Paterson; 29.86% Henz Villaraiz; 14.05%	James Ryan Cesena; 33.03% Henz Villaraiz; 30.95% Mark Oblea; 18.71% Miko Juarez; 17.30%	Allen Cecilio; 40.45% Ford Valencia; 37.57% Henz Villaraiz; 21.98%	Russell Reyes; 44.31% Allen Cecilio; 41.38% James Ryan Cesena; 14.31%	Ford Valencia; 42.56% Tony Labrusca; 33.19% Tristan Ramirez; 12.71% James Ryan Cesena; 11.54%	*Niel Murillo; 98.63% Russell Reyes; 100% Joao Constancia; 87.81% Ford Valencia; 82.03% Tristan Ramirez; 69.27% Tony Labrusca; 66.93% Mark Oblea; 51.03%
Judges' Votes to Save	Aga	Henz Villaraiz	Mark Oblea	Ford Valencia	James Ryan Cesena	James Ryan Cesena	Not implemented anymore
Judges' Votes to Save	Yeng	Henz Villaraiz	Mark Oblea	Ford Valencia	Allen Cecilio	Tristan Ramirez	Not implemented anymore
Judges' Votes to Save	Sandara	Henz Villaraiz	Miko Juarez	Ford Valencia	James Ryan Cesena	James Ryan Cesena	Not implemented anymore
Judges' Votes to Save	Vice	Markus Paterson	Mark Oblea	Ford Valencia	James Ryan Cesena	Tristan Ramirez	Not implemented anymore

Note: (*) Niel Murillo enters the first cut to make on the Superstar Pinoy Boyband by receiving the highest percentage of combined judges scores and public votes. Regardless, all scores of the 6 grand finalists are revert to zero, the remaining grand finalists battle for the last 4 coveted slots to make it to the Superstar Boyband namely "BoybandPH".

== Contestants who appeared on previous shows ==
- Allen Cecilio and Mark Oblea were on the Spogify feat. Singing Baes segment of Eat Bulaga! and were eliminated during the daily round.
- Markus Paterson appeared on ASAP and as an occasional guest on ASAP Chillout.
- Ethan Salvador was one of the current Star Magic Artist and also he's a current co-host of "Swak Na Swak".
- Miggy Campbell was a supporting cast on You're My Home. He also appeared on the music video of "Pare, Mahal Mo Raw Ako", as well as the movie version of the same name.
- Jayvee Mendoza and Bjorn Mendoza were featured on the Ano Ka Hello? singing battle segment of Kapuso Mo, Jessica Soho.
- Kokoy de Santos is a TV commercial actor and a former co-host in Walang Tulugan with the Master Showman. He was cast in various drama series (Futbolilits, Makapiling Kang Muli, Kidlat, My Husband's Lover, Oh My G!, #ParangNormal Activity) and films (Bromance: My Brother's Romance, Kimmy Dora: Ang Kiyemeng Prequel, Kid Kulafu, Kip Oebanda, Tumbang Preso). He also starred in numerous Maalaala Mo Kaya episodes including "Kamao", "Bimpo", "Family Picture", "Red Envelope", "Korona", "Sketch Pad", "Lubid", "Puno", "Picture", and "Hijab".
- Wilbert Rosalyn joined the Tawag ng Tanghalan segment of It's Showtime though he was eliminated during the daily round.
- Julijo Pisk was a contestant of ABS-CBN's Star Circle Summer Kid Quest and was named as the 2nd runner-up.
- Luigi D'Avola was a contestant of Myx VJ Search in MYX back in 2014 and was named as one of the winners of the show.
- Joao Constancia appeared in The Ryzza Mae Show as a contestant in Picture o Tanong? segment and in Eat Bulaga! as part of the audience.

== Reception ==
=== Television Ratings ===
Television ratings for the Pinoy Boyband Superstar on ABS-CBN were gathered from two major sources, namely from AGB Nielsen and Kantar Media. AGB Nielsen's survey ratings were gathered from Mega Manila households; it is worth noting that since July 2016, AGB Nielsen expanded their coverage to include urban Luzon. On the other hand, Kantar Media's survey ratings were gathered from urban and rural households all over the Philippines.

Episode		Original Airdate	Timeslot (PST)	AGB Nielsen			Kantar Media			Source
Episode		Original Airdate	Timeslot (PST)	Rating	Timeslot	Primetime	Rating	Timeslot	Primetime	Source
1	"Judges' Audition Premiere"	September 10, 2016	Saturday, 7:15 p.m.	21.0%	#2	#3	34.4%	#1	#1	
2	"Judges' Audition, Part 2"	September 11, 2016	Sunday, 7:00 p.m.	21.0%	#1	#2	36.4%	#1	#1	
3	"Judges' Audition, Part 3"	September 17, 2016	Saturday, 7:15 p.m.	18.5%	#2	#4	31.5%	#1	#2	
4	"Judges' Audition, Part 4"	September 18, 2016	Sunday, 7:00 p.m.	19.3%	#2	#4	33.6%	#1	#1	
5	"Judges' Audition, Part 5"	September 24, 2016	Saturday, 7:15 p.m.	20.5%	#2	#3	34.5%	#1	#1	
6	"Judges' Audition, Part 6"	September 25, 2016	Sunday, 7:00 p.m.	21.7%	#1	#1	36.3%	#1	#1	
7	"Judges' Audition, Part 7"	October 1, 2016	Saturday, 7:15 p.m.	19.1%	#2	#5	32.9%	#1	#1	
8	"Judges' Audition, Part 8"	October 2, 2016	Sunday, 7:00 p.m.	19.2%	#1	#3	34.9%	#1	#1	
9	"Judges' Audition, Part 9"	October 8, 2016	Saturday, 7:15 p.m.	19.8%	#2	#4	32.6%	#1	#1	
10	"Judges' Audition, Part 10"	October 9, 2016	Sunday, 7:00 p.m.	17.4%	#2	#4	32.5%	#1	#1	
11	"Judges' Audition, Part 11"	October 15, 2016	Saturday, 7:15 p.m.	18.6%	#2	#4	30.6%	#1	#1	
12	"Judges' Audition, Part 12"	October 16, 2016	Sunday, 7:00 p.m.	17.4%	#2	#6	29.9%	#1	#1	
13	"Middle Rounds, Judges' Deliberation"	October 22, 2016	Saturday, 7:15 p.m.	16.4%	#2	#4	28.5%	#1	#1	
14	"Middle Rounds, Last Chance Performance Night"	October 23, 2016	Sunday, 7:00 p.m.	16.5%	#2	#6	30.3%	#1	#2	
15	"Middle Rounds, Performance Night 1"	October 29, 2016	Saturday, 7:15 p.m.	14.5%	#2	#5	26.7%	#2	#2	
16	"Middle Rounds, Performance Night 2"	October 30, 2016	Sunday, 7:00 p.m.	15.4%	#2	#5	28.2%	#1	#1	
17	"Live Shows, Top 12 Performance"	November 5, 2016	Saturday, 7:15 p.m.	16.5%	#2	#4	28.5%	#2	#2	
18	"Live Shows, Top 12 Results"	November 6, 2016	Sunday, 7:00 p.m.	15.5%	#2	#6	30.9%	#1	#1	
19	"Live Shows, Top 11 Performance"	November 12, 2016	Saturday, 7:15 p.m.	15.6%	#2	#4	26.0%	#1	#1	
20	"Live Shows, Top 11 Results"	November 13, 2016	Sunday, 7:00 p.m.	14.5%	#2	#7	27.7%	#1	#1	
21	"Live Shows, Top 10 Performance"	November 19, 2016	Saturday, 7:15 p.m.	13.6%	#2	#6	Unavailable			
22	"Live Shows, Top 10 Results"	November 20, 2016	Sunday, 7:00 p.m.	13.4%	#2	#6	Unavailable			
23	"Live Shows, Top 9 Performance"	November 26, 2016	Saturday, 7:15 p.m.	13.3%	#3	#6	25.5%	#1	#3	
24	"Live Shows, Top 9 Results"	November 27, 2016	Sunday, 7:00 p.m.	12.8%	#2	#6	27.3%	#1	#2	
25	"Live Shows, Top 8 Performance"	December 3, 2016	Saturday, 7:15 p.m.	16.7%	#2	#4	25.7%	#1	#1	
26	"Live Shows, Top 8 Results"	December 4, 2016	Sunday, 7:00 p.m.	17.5%	#2	#4	26.8%	#1	#2	
27	"The Grand Reveal, Part 1"	December 10, 2016	Saturday, 7:15 p.m.	16.4%	#2	#5	26.2%	#1	#2	
28	"The Grand Reveal, Part 2"	December 11, 2016	Sunday, 7:00 p.m.	17.4%	#2	#4	29.8%	#1	#1	
