= Joao Constancia =

Filipino actor, dancer, and singer (born 1996)

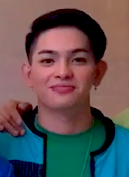
- Constancia in 2018
- Born: João Micael Villanueva Constancia; December 22, 1996 (age 29); Portuguese Macau
- Occupations: Actor; dancer; singer
- Years active: 2016–present
- Agent: Cornerstone Entertainment Star Magic
- Known for: He's Into Her, BoybandPH
- Musical career
- Genres: Pop; OPM; P-pop; EDM
- Instrument: Vocals
- Label: Star Music (2016–present)
- Formerly of: BoybandPH

João Micael Villanueva Constancia (born December 22, 1996) is a Filipino actor, dancer and singer. Constancia is known for his roles in Four Sisters Before the Wedding (2020) and He's Into Her (2021), both produced by Star Cinema. His other notable credits include Ngayon at Kailanman (2018), Can't Buy Me Love (2023), and a lead role in My Lockdown Romance (2020) with Jameson Blake.

Apart from his acting career, Constancia is also a member of boyband group BoybandPH.

== Early life ==
Constancia was born and raised in Macau to Filipino parents. He is the eldest among three siblings.

In an interview published in StarStudio Magazine, Constancia stated that despite having lived in Macau, he is still Filipino at heart and determined to pursue his dream of becoming an actor in Philippine entertainment. In a separate interview, Constancia stated that his dream of becoming an actor was inspired by watching Pinoy Big Brother, particularly the Teen Clash 2010 edition featuring James Reid. As a result, he auditioned for the show as well as Pinoy Boyband Superstar, which were holding auditions at the same time. His audition for Pinoy Big Brother was unsuccessful, but he received a callback for Pinoy Boyband Superstar.

== Career ==
In September 2016, Constancia auditioned for ABS-CBN's Philippine reality boyband search, Pinoy Boyband Superstar. Later in the same year, he emerged as one of the winners alongside four other aspirants Niel Murillo, Russell Reyes, Tristan Ramirez and Ford Valencia, to form BoybandPH. They released their debut self-titled album in February 2017, under Star Music.

Subsequent to BoyBandPH, Constancia pursued his acting career. He played a supporting role in the ABS-CBN romantic drama television series Ngayon at Kailanman as young police officer Dominic Consuelo. The following year, he made his film debut with a small part in Mae Cruz-Alviar's 2019 film Unbreakable. In 2020, Constancia was cast as Chad Quinto (originally played by Bernard Palanca), the love interest of Bobbie Salazar (played by Alexa Ilacad) in Four Sisters Before the Wedding, also directed by Cruz-Alviar. The film, a prequel to the hit 2013 film Four Sisters and a Wedding, received a limited theatrical run during the COVID-19 pandemic. In the same year, Constancia starred alongside Jameson Blake in the film My Lockdown Romance. In March 2021, Constancia appeared in an episode of Maalaala Mo Kaya, the Philippines' longest-running anthology drama series. His performance as the visually impaired Petrus was well received, with one commentator noting his "outstanding acting talent." In preparation for the role, Constancia consulted YouTube videos of people with disabilities, and modelled his performance on Al Pacino's in Scent of a Woman.

Constancia also starred as Lee Roi Gozon in the iWantTFC romantic comedy series He's Into Her (2021–2022), starring Belle Mariano and Donny Pangilinan, and based on the popular Wattpad novel by Maxine Lat Calibuso. In 2023, he played the character of Carlo Tiu in the ABS-CBN romantic drama television series Can't Buy Me Love. In 2024, Constancia starred again with Jameson Blake in TV5's comedy-drama television series Padyak Princess, headed by Miles Ocampo. Constancia also starred alongside Vivoree Esclito in the 20th edition of "Wishdate: Rewrite", a concert experience blending film and live music presented by Wish 107.5 and KDR Music House.

== Filmography ==
=== Film ===
Year	Title	Role	Ref(s)
2019	Unbreakable	Alfred	
2020	My Lockdown Romance	Kendrick Villaverde	
2020	Four Sisters Before the Wedding	Chad Quinto	
2026	Poon †		

=== Television ===
Year	Title	Role	Notes	Ref(s)
2018	Wansapanataym	Jason Mallari	Episodes 395-403: "Ofishially Yours"	
2018	Alamat Ng Ano	Benji	Episode: "Bayawak Band"	
2018–2019	Ngayon at Kailanman	Dominic "Dom" Dupaya	Supporting role	
2020	Ipaglaban Mo!	Movie actor	Episode: "Ungol"; cameo appearance	
2021	Maalaala Mo Kaya	Petrus Niño Samonte	Episode: "Tungkod"	
2021–present	ASAP Natin 'To	Himself	Performer	
2021–2022	He's Into Her	Lee Roi Gozon	Supporting role	
2023	PIE Shorts: Cool Off	Christian	YouTube miniseries	
2023	Can't Buy Me Love	Carlo Tiu	Supporting role	
2024	Padyak Princess	Miko Santos	Main role	
2025	Vibe	Himself	Host, Performer	
2025	Till Debt Do Us Part	Joaquin Alejandro	BingoPlus x Dashflix vertical series	
2025	Ang Prinsesa at Ang Pooreza	Kadyo	CignalPlay microdrama/vertical series	
2026	My Bespren Emman	Daniel		

== Discography ==
=== Studio albums ===
Year	Album title	Recording Label	Certification
2017	BoybandPH - EP	Star Music	Gold Record

=== Singles ===
Title	Year	Album	Recording Label
"We Made It"	2016	BoybandPH - EP	Star Music
"Unli"	2017	BoybandPH - EP	Star Music
"Somebody"	2017	BoybandPH - EP	Star Music
"Pretty Mama"	2021	Non-album single	Cornerstone Music
