= Ngayon at Kailanman (2018 TV series) =

2018–19 Philippine television drama series

- Title card
- Also known as: Now and Forever
- Genre: Romantic drama
- Created by: Jay Fernando; Henry King Quitain
- Written by: Benjamin Lingan; Generiza Reyes Francisco; Ronalisa Co; Maan Dimaculangan-Fampulme
- Directed by: Mae Cruz-Alviar; Elfren P. Vibar; Richard I. Arellano
- Starring: Joshua Garcia; Julia Barretto
- Opening theme: "Ngayon at Kailanman" by Jona
- Composer: George Canseco
- Country of origin: Philippines
- Original language: Filipino
- No. of seasons: 1
- No. of episodes: 110 (list of episodes)

Production
- Executive producers: Carlo Katigbak; Cory Vidanes; Laurenti Dyogi; Malou Santos; Des De Guzman
- Producers: Jennifer Soliman-Bolalin; Ronald L. Faina; Kristine P. Sioson; Marie Kris Macas
- Editors: Kathryn Jerry Perez; Joshua Ducasen; BJ Karganilla; Jenilie Pelayo; Raymond Samaniego; Alan Pimentel
- Running time: 30–42 minutes
- Production company: Star Creatives

Original release
- Network: ABS-CBN
- Release: August 20, 2018 – January 18, 2019

Ngayon at Kailanman (International title: Now and Forever) is a Philippine television drama romance series broadcast by ABS-CBN. Directed by Mae Cruz-Alviar, Elfren P. Vibar and Richard I. Arellano, it stars Joshua Garcia and Julia Barretto. It aired on the network's Primetime Bida line up and worldwide on TFC from August 20, 2018 to January 18, 2019.

== Premise ==
The series follows Eva, who seeks the truth about a secret held by the Cortes Clan, one of the country's wealthiest families, and tries to reclaim her place as heiress to the family's fortune and to the Nostalgia, a necklace that has been among the family's most important possessions for almost a century. Her search becomes entangled with a love story involving Inno and Oliver, the sons of Cortes matriarch Stella. As Eva contends with people pursuing the Cortes wealth and name, and as the Nostalgia is returned to her, she comes to value family, forgiveness, redemption and love.

== Cast and characters ==
Cast

Joshua Garcia

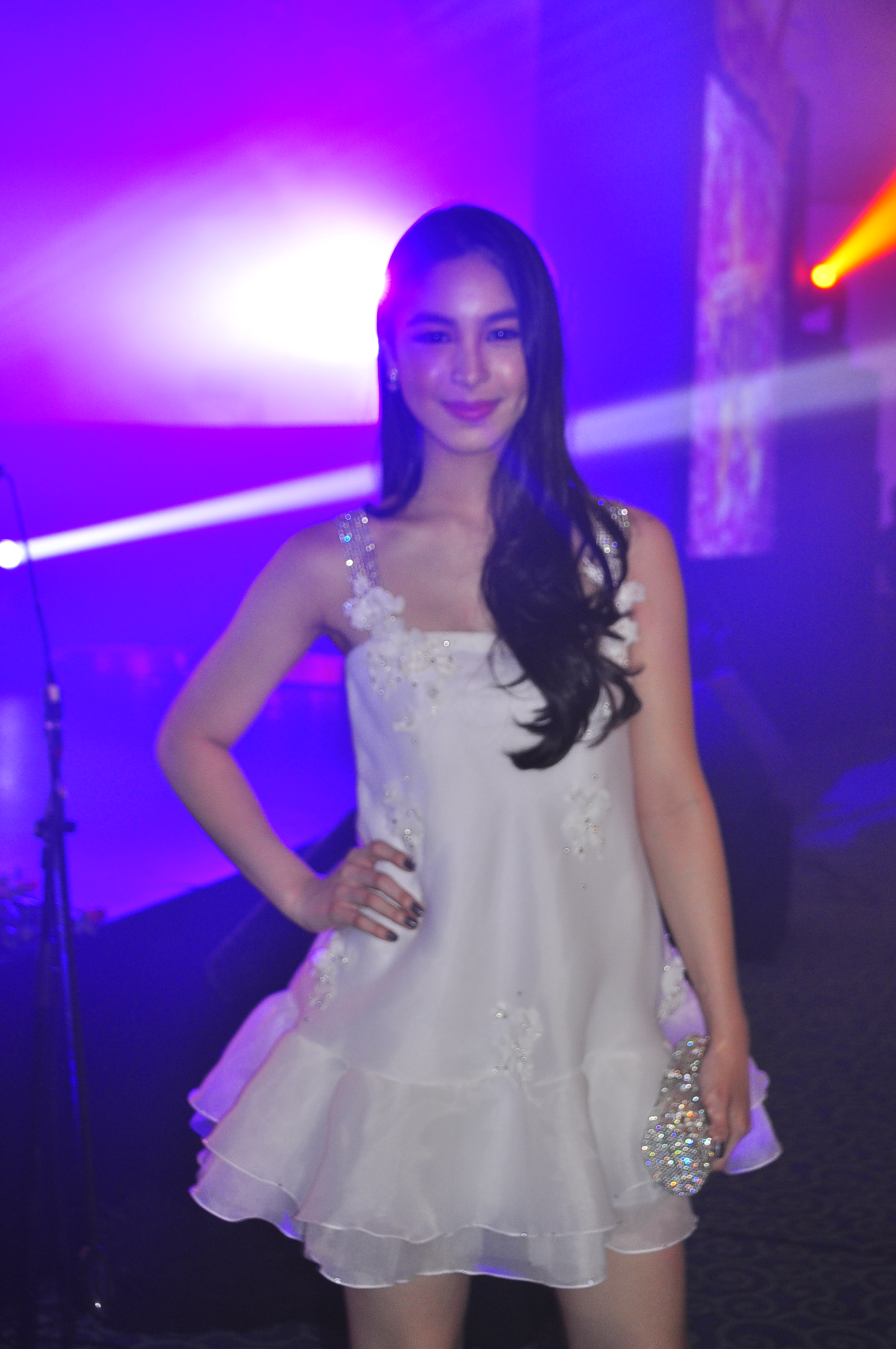
Julia Barretto

=== Main cast ===
- Joshua Garcia as Innocencio "Inno" S. Cortes
- Julia Barretto as Eva Mapendo / Angela M. Cortes

=== Supporting cast ===
- Iza Calzado as Rebecca Marquez-Young
- Alice Dixson as Stella Simbajon-Cortes
- Ina Raymundo as Adessa Mapendo
- Dominic Ochoa as Abel Dimaguiba
- Christian Vasquez as Hernan A. Cortes
- Jameson Blake as Oliver "Oli" S. Cortes
- Joao Constancia as Dominic "Dom" Consuelo
- Rio Locsin as Rosa Mapendo
- Rosemarie Gil as Doña Carmen Alipio-Cortes
- Elisse Joson as Roxanne / Christina M. Constantino

=== Recurring cast ===
- Leo Rialp as Mayor Nanding Simbajon
- Maria Isabel Lopez as Lucia Simbajon
- Rey Abellana as Atty. Alfred Cortes
- Ana Capri as Ising Bernabe
- Erika Padilla as Mariel Saavedra
- Claire Ruiz as Cathy Bermudez
- Cai Cortez as Mela
- Pen Medina as Lodi
- Jason Gainza as Macoy
- Kristel Fulgar as Queenie
- Igi Boy Flores as Owa
- BJ Forbes as Buboy
- Yayo Aguila as Sonia
- Ruby Ruiz as Miding

=== Minor cast ===
- William Lorenzo as Larry
- Jef Gaitan as Janix
- Joe Vargas as Kiko
- Mark Neumann as Jin
- Kokoy de Santos as Carl
- MJ Cayabyab as Isda
- Drake Ventenilla as Popo
- Bradley Holmes as Bryan
- Dwight Gaston as Botong
- Gerard Acao as Mokmok
- Via Antonio as Mimay
- Mark Oblea as Dario
- Gem Ramos as Elaine
- TJ Valderrama as Ferdie
- Richard Manabat as Ricky
- Ethyl Osorio as Jennifer
- Joel Molina as Emil
- Jojo Riguerra as Victor
- Keann Johnson as Marc
- Royce Cabrera as the Boyfriend of Oliver's lover

=== Guest cast ===
- Karen Reyes as Elisse
- Chienna Filomeno as Maxine
- Cindy Miranda as Victoria
- Nanette Inventor as Rosemarie
- Dindo Arroyo as Zach
- Jonic Magno as Paul
- Giovanni Baldisseri as Omar
- Nina Ricci Alagao as Betsy
- Eric Tai as Neil
- Juan Miguel Severo as a spoken word artist

=== Special participation ===
- Ruffa Gutierrez as Loreta Miranda
- Dante Rivero as Don Julian Cortes
- TJ Trinidad as Rodrigo Cortes
- Mercedes Cabral as Mia Bartolome
- Manuel Chua as Joey Bartolome
- Sophia Reola as young Angela/Eva
- Andrez del Rosario as young Inno
- Nezzar Piti-Ilan as young Oli

== Production ==
The series was first announced in November 2017 with a working title Nostalgia. On August 8, 2018, the full of trailer of the series was released, with Ngayon at Kailanman being the official title.

== Reception ==
Kantar Media National TV Ratings (8:40PM PST)
Pilot Episode	Finale Episode	Peak	Average
31.2% August 20, 2018	34.7% January 18, 2019	34.7% January 18, 2019	28.5%

== Broadcast ==
=== Original run ===
Ngayon at Kailanman premiered on August 20, 2018 and completed on January 18, 2019.

=== Re-runs ===
The show aired re-runs on Jeepney TV from November 9, 2020 to May 9, 2020 (replacing the re-runs of Since I Found You and was replaced by the re-runs of Starla); and March 28 to October 3, 2021 (replacing the re-runs of Pangako sa 'Yo 2015 and was replaced by the re-runs of Born for You).

It also aired re-runs on ALLTV from September 14, 2022 to January 1, 2023 (as part of its first programming on the network and was replaced by the re-runs of Till I Met You); and April 17 to August 4, 2023 (replacing the re-runs of Till I Met You and was replaced by the re-runs of Sino ang Maysala?: Mea Culpa).

== Awards and nominations ==
Year	Award giving body	Category	Recipient	Results
2019	33rd PMPC Star Awards for TV	Best Primetime Drama Series	Ngayon at Kailanman	Nominated

== See also ==
- List of programs broadcast by ABS-CBN
- List of programs broadcast by Jeepney TV
- List of ABS-CBN Studios original drama series
