= 1997 in the Philippines =

- Decades: 1970s; 1980s; 1990s; 2000s; 2010s
- See also: List of years in the Philippines; films

1997 in the Philippines details events of note that happened in the Philippines in the year 1997.

== Incumbents ==
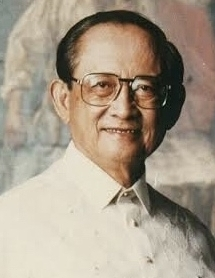
Fidel V.
Ramos

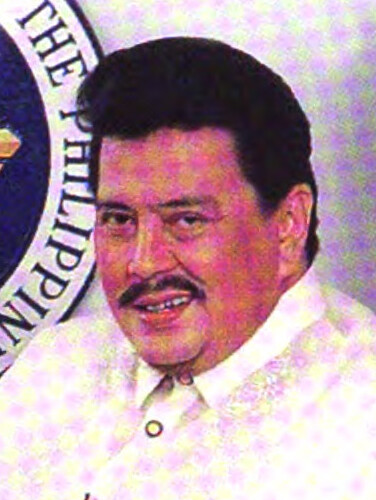
Joseph E.
Estrada

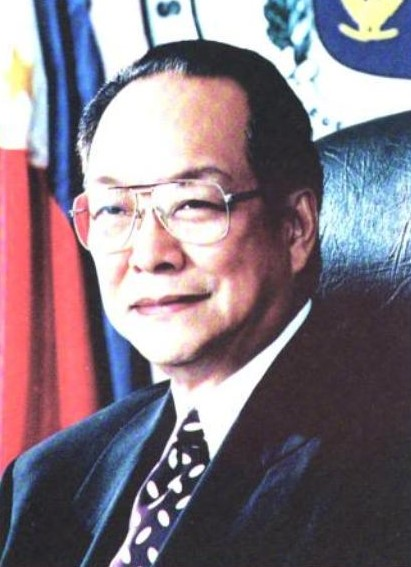
Ernesto M.
Maceda Sr.

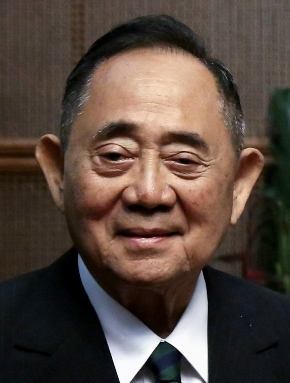
Jose C.
de Venecia Jr.

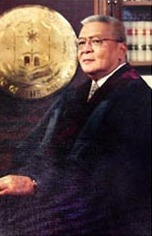
Andres D.
Narvasa

- President: Fidel Ramos (Lakas)
- Vice President: Joseph Estrada (LAMMP)
- Senate President: Ernesto Maceda
- House Speaker: Jose de Venecia, Jr.
- Chief Justice: Andres Narvasa
- Philippine Congress: 10th Congress of the Philippines

== Events ==
=== January ===
- January 3 – The Bureau of Immigration adopts a policy against foreigners with unauthorized stay in the country, by virtue of the Alien Social Integration Act.
- January 7 – A Presidential citation is given to Rhona Mahilum, who was noted for rescuing her siblings from their burning house in Negros Occidental.
- January 8 – President Ramos announces the renewal of ban from entering the country on Timorese independence leader and Nobel Peace Prize winner José Ramos-Horta of Indonesia on the basis of "national security". It is the third time Ramos-Horta who has been banned from the country in November 1996, has been given such restriction since 1994.
- January 15 – A memorandum of understanding is signed by the Department of Social Welfare and Development and Japanese non-governmental organization Asian Women's Fund, aiming to provide assistance to former comfort women.
- January 16 – The Cagayan de Oro regional court sentences Alex Bartolome to death for the repeated sexual abuse of his underage daughter between 1993 and 1995. His execution by lethal injection in January 2000 would be the last to be carried out in the Philippines before the abolition of capital punishment in 2006.
- January 17 – Zamboanga del Norte representative Romeo Jalosjos is arrested in Bagac, Bataan. Jalosjos, being charged of statutory rape and acts of lasciviousness, has been subjected to a nationwide manhunt by the National Bureau of Investigation as ordered by the Makati Regional Trial Court (RTC) on December 26, 1996.
- January 26 – Police arrests William Batungbakal, a former member of the Alex Boncayao Brigade and the gunman in the 1995 ambush-killing of Police Chief Inspector Jose Pring, in Malate, Manila.
- January 27:
  - A ceasefire agreement between the national government, through the Philippine Army, and the Moro Islamic Liberation Front (MILF) is signed in Maguindanao, ending more than a week of fighting in Buldon.
  - A passenger bus, traversing the Pilar–Manila route, plunges into a ravine in Labo, Camarines Norte, killing nineteen people including the driver.
- January 28–31 – The Department of Environment and Natural Resources exterminates through lethal injection 596 monkeys at a breeding farm in Calamba, Laguna, on order of the Department of Health to prevent the possible outbreak of the Ebola Reston virus that has killed seven others. A news blackout occurs where journalists are forcibly barred and later restricted from covering the process.
- January 29 – President Ramos signs the law strengthening the country's science and technology program (Republic Act No. 8248).
- January 31:
  - First Lady Amelita Ramos leads the launching of the country's bulk carrier, Sea Amelita, in Tsuneishi shipyard in Balamban, Cebu.
  - The Court of Appeals (CA), acting on a petition by private individuals led by Rizal governor Casimiro Ynares and former representative Francisco Sumulong, temporarily cancels the privatization of the Metropolitan Waterworks and Sewerage System (MWSS), preventing the government from finalizing the sale to the winning bidders. Benpres and Ayala groups have won a 25-year deal for the world's largest privatization of a water utility, being announced on January 23.
  - A state of calamity is declared in Agusan del Sur, Davao del Sur and Davao Oriental due to flash floods caused by continuous rains on January 12.

=== February ===
- February 3 – The Supreme Court votes, 11–4, to stop the sale of 51 percent of the Manila Hotel to Malaysian company Renong Berhad, and orders its owner, the Government Service Insurance System, to sell it instead to Manila Prince Hotel, citing the constitution's "Filipino first" provision and the hotel being part of the "national patrimony". The Committee on Privatization would later file a petition for rebidding.
- February 4 – Three gunmen assassinate Bishop Benjamin de Jesus in front of Jolo Cathedral in Jolo, Sulu, in what would be the country's first killing of a Roman Catholic bishop.
- February 5 – President Ramos signs Republic Act No. 8249, amending the charter of Sandiganbayan.
- February 8 – Republic Act No. 8180, the law deregulating the oil industry, takes effect, ending twenty years of government control of oil companies and removing subsidies. As early as February 5, several protest rallies, demanding the repeal of the said law, have been conducted.
- February 13 – A Beechcraft Baron explodes and crashes off Naic and Cavite City in Cavite, while on its way to Manila from Mindoro. All six individuals are either confirmed or presumed dead.
- February 14 – A Beechcraft RPC 1919 crashes upon takeoff at an airport in Jolo, Sulu, killing retired Cotabato City auxiliary bishop Antonino Nepomuceno and 3–4 other individuals. The plane crash is initially believed caused by either being shot or a pilot error.
- February 18 – A Senate resolution affirming their absolute opposition to the constitutional amendments is adopted.
- February 19:
  - The Court of Appeals dismisses a petition by a Rizal-based group against the privatization of the Metropolitan Waterworks and Sewerage System (MWSS), citing lack of merit; upholding a Manila RTC ruling. MWSS would be awarded to the winning bidders two days later.
  - Sandiganbayan orders a 90-day suspension of senator Miriam Defensor-Santiago in relation to graft charges filed in 1995 while she was the chief of the Bureau of Immigration and Deportation.
- February 21 – A House resolution granting amnesty to the members of Reform the Armed Forces Movement – Soldiers of the Filipino People – Young Officers Union (RAM–SFP–YOU), concurring with Proclamation No. 723, is approved.
- February 22 – Joel Arnan, leader of Kuratong Solido group, and two fellow inmates, escape from a municipal jail in San Pedro, Laguna, during a noise barrage and despite being guarded by the elite force from Western Police District Command.
- February 23 – During a private meeting at the residence of Christopher Carrion in Ayala Alabang Village, in Muntinlupa, President Fidel Ramos informs the former President Corazon Aquino that he could not halt the campaign on Constitutional reform in the Philippines, citing it as a violation of freedom of expression. Ramos emphasized his commitment to uphold the Constitution and denied involvement in the initiative.

=== March ===
- March 1 – South African president Nelson Mandela, beginning his three-day state visit, arrives in the country.
- March 17 – The longest bridge in Pangasinan, connecting the municipalities of Santa Maria and Asingan, is inaugurated.
- March 19 – President Ramos grants temporary asylum to Hwang Jang-yop, the top ideologue from North Korea.
- March 26 – Las Piñas becomes a highly urbanized city in Metro Manila through ratification of Republic Act 8251.

=== April ===
- April 8 – The Supreme Court issues a temporary restraining order from the government's implementation of the national identification system.
- April 9 – President Ramos orders the release of ₱595 million, which is intended for the partial payment for pension adjustment of the World War II veterans.
- April 16 – As part of the government campaign to prevent polio in the country, five million children are given free anti-polio vaccines.
- April 20 – The main camp of the MILF in Sirawai, Zamboanga del Norte, is captured by the government forces, with seven rebels killed.
- April 21 – Malacañang confirms the government's dropping of its opposition to the asylum application of communist leader Jose Maria Sison, then exiled in the Netherlands.
- April 24 – The leadership of the Armed Forces of the Philippines (AFP) affirms banning of homosexuals in the military.
- April 27 – MILF confirms that five thousand Moro National Liberation Front rebels have been defected to their side, citing the allegedly slow implementation of the government's livelihood programs.
- April 29–30 – The military dispatches marine reinforcements to the disputed Spratly Islands following reports that three armed Chinese Navy warships have been deployed there. Jet fighters are deployed the following day to augment the contingent, at the same time of Manila's protest demanding Beijing's explanation. On May 3, China, stressing its sovereignty over the area, insists of legal rights to dispatch their vessels.

=== May ===
- May 2 – The Supreme Court affirms the validity of the country's membership in the World Trade Organization.
- May 9 – The World Bank approves new loans, worth about $1 billion, to the country, which will cover programs on poverty alleviation, infrastructure, and natural resources, for the next three years.
- May 11 – Military personnel in election duty are attacked in Lantawan, Basilan by thirty Abu Sayyaf members, with seven from the latter killed in the gunfight.
- May 20 – The Philippines rejects the proposed exploration with China on the disputed Scarborough Shoal. Eight days later, President Ramos favors the agreement on the countries' joint development of the area.
- May 21 – The Philippine Coast Guard arrests twenty-one Chinese fishermen at the Scarborough Shoal. On May 30, Taiwan, claiming that the area is part of their sovereign territory, complains the said arrest. On May 26, foreign ministry officials of the Philippines and China meet in Beijing, in an attempt to de-escalate tension caused by conflicting claims in the area.
- May 26 and June 4 – President Ramos declares a state of calamity in Metro Manila and the provinces of Bataan, Bulacan, Pampanga, Rizal and Zambales due to the impact of Tropical Depression Bining.
- May 28 – The launch of the country's first electronic library project in Manila Hotel is led by the Commission on Higher Education and Department of Education, Culture and Sports.
- May 31 – Sandiganbayan dismisses graft charges against former First Lady Imelda Marcos on the allegations of receiving bribes while she was the minister of human settlements, citing insufficient evidence.

=== June ===
- June 4:
  - Vice president Estrada resigns as chairperson of the Presidential Anti-Crime Commission, reportedly to prepare for his presidential bid.
  - A state of calamity (man-made) is declared in Basilan, Maguindanao, Sulu, Zamboanga del Norte and Zamboanga del Sur due to sporadic fighting between the government and outlaw groups.
- June 5 – A state of calamity is declared in Cotabato City and the municipality of Pilar, Sorsogon, both affected by fires that separately occurred on April 26.
- June 10 – The Supreme Court dismisses with finality the motion for reconsideration submitted by PIRMA proponents and government counsel for the constitutional reform, upholding its earlier decision stopping such attempts.
- June 14 – FVR declares that he had authorized the Legislative-Executive Development Advisory Council (LEDAC), to expedite a bill on people's initiative based on the reasons provided by the Supreme Court in rejecting the petition.
- June 16 – Forty-three surveyors from a state-run oil firm are captured by suspected MILF guerrillas in Sultan sa Barongis, Maguindanao, but are later freed. This led to a massive army offensive against the MILF that would begin the following day, occurred in Pagalungan, also in Maguindanao, and in parts of Cotabato. As of June 28, clashes have killed 146 from the MILF and twelve troops.
- June 22 – President Ramos signs Proclamation No. 1030 declaring the Philippine tarsier a specially protected fauna.
- June 23 – The military fires warning shots at a Chinese fishing vessel, which anchored near a Filipino-held island in the Spratlys.
- June 26:
  - Some 110 active law enforcement personnel are placed by the Intelligence community on a wanted list for alleged role in kidnapping activities.
  - Sixty passengers are seized by 150 MILF separatists from two buses at a road block in Maguindanao; 41 of them escapes. The rebels later flee to Kabacan, Cotabato, where a shootout occurs, leaving seven people dead. Among the civilian hostages, two are killed, while ten are still being held as of the following day.
  - Government troops capture Camp Rajamuda, a major MILF base, in Pikit, Cotabato.
- June 27:
  - An army detachment in Kabacan is attacked by 50 MILF fighters, 13 of whom will be killed in a gunbattle.
  - A state of calamity (man-made) is declared in some municipalities in Cotabato (Carmen, Kabacan and Pikit) and Maguindanao (Datu Piang, Kabuntalan, Pagalungan, S.K. Pendatun and Sultan sa Barongis) due to the ongoing armed conflict between the AFP and the MILF.

=== July ===
- July 11 – The Philippines begin to experience the effect of the Asian financial crisis; the peso devalues by 11.5% with the peso-dollar rate recorded at ₱29.45. Further depreciation causes the Philippine Stock Exchange composite index to go down, and mainly affects the country's economic growth, with annual nominal GDP per capita drops by 12.5% from the previous year. The crisis affects numerous countries in East and Southeast Asia.
- July 16 – Sisters Marijoy and Jacqueline Chiong were abducted and killed in Cebu City, the suspects were later sentenced to death, which in turn would lead to the abolition of death penalty in 2006.

=== August ===
- August 2 – Kabankalan becomes a component city in the province of Negros Occidental through ratification of Republic Act 8297.
- August 15:
  - Ferry boat F/B King Roger, on board 43 tourists from Hong Kong, overturns and capsizes off Manila South Harbor while returning to the Manila Yacht Club marina from a tour of Manila Bay, killing seven.
  - Passenger ferry M/V Kalibo Star, with a Cebu–Tacloban route, overturns and sinks off Biliran, leaving at least 12 dead and 13 missing.
- August 19 – Agila-2 communications satellite was launched from China and began commercial service. It is the first satellite of the country not acquired while in orbit.

=== September ===
- Early September:
  - Simultaneous grenade explosions at bus terminals in Manila and Bulacan, targeting commuters, kill six and injure 105. A previously unknown, pro-government group Filipino Soldiers for the Nation claims responsibility for these attacks.
  - The ruling party suspends legislative deliberations on proposed constitutional amendments, including lifting of the term limits, withdrawing a House resolution seeking to convene Congress into a Constituent Assembly to discuss such.
- September 15 – A state of calamity is declared in Aurora, Batanes, Cagayan and Isabela due to the impact of Typhoon Miling.
- September 21 – Church leaders spearhead massive, multi-sectoral protests nationwide to oppose charter change, particularly another term for President Ramos, and dictatorship, coinciding with the anniversary of the 1972 declaration of martial law and joined by over a million people including local officials. In Rizal Park in Manila, Cardinal Jaime Sin and former president Corazon Aquino led the rally of about 600,000 people, including members of leftist groups, in the country's largest rally in more than a decade. A day prior, Ramos announces stepping down at the end of his 6-year term in 1998, and that he is pushing for a constitutional convention to discuss amendments thereafter.
- September 22 – Two overloaded PNR Metro trains collide, causing a train coach to hit into a squatter area in Muntinlupa, killing nine people and injuring more than 200 in one of the country's worst railway accidents.
- September 23 – The Supreme Court unanimously (13–0) rejects the petition of the People's Initiative for Reform, Modernization and Action (PIRMA) to reconsider its "people's initiative" to amend the constitution, and for the Commission on Elections to validate signatures of six million individuals who have been in favor, ending all efforts for such. Eight justices claim there is no enabling law, while six others say the petition is faulty.
- September 25 – A clash between the armed supporters of provincial governor Abdusakur Tan and Jolo municipal mayor Sout Tan occurs at the municipalities of Maimbung and Indanan in Sulu, killing 17 from both camps.
- September 29 – A state of calamity is declared in Tangub, Misamis Occidental, which was affected by flash flood caused by heavy rains in December 1996.
- September 30 – Anti-Rape Law (Republic Act 8353) is passed.

=== October ===
- Early October:
  - A cargo truck collides into a minibus in Tampilisan, Zamboanga del Norte, reportedly killing 25 people, mostly secondary students aboard the truck, in then the worst road accident in the Zamboanga peninsula area.
  - The Supreme Court, acting on one of two motions filed by Bataan representative Enrique Garcia, stops the imposition of price increases of petroleum products for 30 days.
  - President Ramos, in his visit to Boracay in Aklan, announces that the waters surrounding the island are safe, following the coliform scare in July that has caused significant decline on tourist arrivals.
- October 6 – The MILF publicly executes by firing squad two individuals, having been convicted of various crimes by its Shariah court, beside the town hall of Masiu, Lanao del Sur; photographs of which are published in the October 9 issue of Philippine Daily Inquirer. The executions later cause massive condemnations; charges are later filed by the police against some individuals including MILF members.
- October 14 – Two foreign terrorists, identified as an Egyptian and a Saudi, conduct a suicide attack on Camp Siongco, a Philippine Army headquarters near Cotabato City, killing three soldiers before being killed; their two Filipino companions then escape.
- Mid-October – The national government and the MILF signs implementing guidelines for the ceasefire agreement, which would cover Mindanao, Palawan and Sulu.
- October 19 – Twenty-one inmates facing various charges escape from the Las Piñas city jail; one of them is shot, while another surrenders shortly. The pre-dawn jailbreak prompts a massive police manhunt.
- October 20 – The MILF orders to stop its public executions of convicts, reportedly by the virtue of Islamic Shariah law, temporarily deferring such until November 12 following the national government's condemnation on the Lanao del Sur incident.
- October 27 – President Ramos signs RA No. 8368 repealing the Anti-Squatting Law (Presidential Decree No. 772); decriminalizing squatting but maintaining sanctions against professional squatters and squatting syndicates.
- October 28 – President Ramos signs into law RA No. 8369, creating special courts exclusively for the cases involving children and family relations.
- October 29:
  - President Ramos signs Indigenous Peoples' Rights Act (RA No. 8371), a law protecting the rights of the indigenous sector to their ancestral domains and creating the National Commission on Indigenous Peoples.
  - The Supreme Court upholds the rejection by the Philippine Stock Exchange of the application for listing of Puerto Azul Land Inc. (PALI) in March 1996, stopping the public listing of the company's shares. PALI was sequestered from the Marcoses; and its transfer of its property has been questioned.

=== November ===
- November 5 – The Supreme Court votes, 9–2, to declare as unconstitutional a law (RA No. 8180) that deregulated the oil industry, citing that it impedes free competition and the Congress should pass a new one conforming with the constitution.
- Mid-November:
  - Clashes between the MILF and guards of a coconut plantation in Maguindanao, reportedly owned by the Dimaporo family, during an attempt by the former to attack the area result in the deaths of eight rebels, including their leader, and two civilians.
  - Ombudsman Aniano Desierto orders the dismissal of Moalboal, Cebu, mayor Alfredo Marcelo Abrenica for his involvement in the killing of a resort owner in 1996.
- November 14 – The national government and the MILF sign an agreement detailing the operational guidelines for the general ceasefire.
- Late November – President Ramos declares a state of calamity over Metro Manila and Bulacan due to water shortage caused by the El Niño; and approves the imposition of water rationing in these areas, along with Cavite and Rizal, effective December 1.

=== December ===
- Early December – In the United States, a Federal appeals court dismisses a lawsuit filed in Los Angeles by alleged victims of human rights violations under Marcos administration, seeking to freeze nearly $500 million in Marcos assets in two banks in Switzerland, citing possible violation of the Act of State doctrine. The Swiss high court has already ordered the freezing of the bank accounts in 1990.
- December 12 – The Makati RTC convicts representative Jalosjos of crimes against chastity in relation to the cases filed by a female minor, and sentences him to life imprisonment.
- December 18 – Binan, Laguna, mayor Bayani Almonte, along with an alleged pimp, is convicted by a judicial court of rape despite the victim's desistance, and is sentenced to life imprisonment.
- December 22 – President Ramos signs seven social reform bills into law, including computerization of the electoral process beginning in the following year (RA No. 8436); proposed autonomy for the Cordilleras; agriculture and fisheries modernization; magna carta for science and technology; and extension of recognition to the WWII veterans and confirmation of their services.
- December 26 – Heavy rains cause the collapse of the gold mine tunnels in Mount Diwata in Monkayo, then part of Davao del Norte; five are rescued; later reports confirm that 80 miners are killed.

== Holidays ==
As per Executive Order No. 292, chapter 7 section 26, the following are regular holidays and special days, approved on July 25, 1987. Note that in the list, holidays in bold are "regular holidays" and those in italics are "nationwide special days".

- January 1 – **New Year's Day**
- March 27 – **Maundy Thursday**
- March 28 – **Good Friday**
- March 29 – Holy Saturday
- April 9 – **Araw ng Kagitingan** (Day of Valor)
- May 1 – **Labor Day**
- May 12 – Barangay elections
- June 12 – **Independence Day**
- August 31 – **National Heroes Day**
- November 1 – All Saints Day
- November 30 – **Bonifacio Day**
- December 25 – **Christmas Day**
- December 26 – additional special day
- December 30 – **Rizal Day**
- December 31 – Last Day of the Year

In addition, several other places observe local holidays, such as the foundation of their town. These are also "special days."

== Business and economy ==
- January 3 – The Bangko Sentral ng Pilipinas (BSP) extends the use of old peso coins for transactions. All coins released before 1995, when the new series began to circulate, have been ordered demonetized at this year's start, effectively excluding in circulation 2-peso and 50-centavo coins. For the entire 1997, old coins are still accepted in banks.
- April 23 – Thirty-one branches of Monte de Piedad, the Asia's oldest thrift bank formerly owned by the Archdiocese of Manila, go on "bank holiday" after being declared insolvent by the BSP. Church officials, including Cardinal and archbishop Sin, have been accused of causing the collapse of the bank. The bank reopens on May 8 under the Singaporean conglomerate Keppel Group.

== Entertainment and culture ==
- February 6 – Entertainment magazine columnist Cristy Fermin is convicted by a judicial court of libel, filed in 1995 by actress Annabelle Rama, whom she accused of embezzlement, along with her husband Eddie Gutierrez, in the United States. She is given a maximum of 1½-year prison sentence.
- February 22 – Jaya wins the grand prize in the 2nd Asian Song Festival held in Hong Kong, for her rendition of the song "You Lift Me Up".
- December – An episode of Batibot, a production being aired over GMA-7, on "Child of Labor: Sugarcane Workers" wins the UNICEF Prize from the 24th Japan Prize International Educational Program Contest; the prize is received at awarding ceremonies held in Tokyo.

== Sports ==
- January:
  - Filipino participants win the team events at the Hong Kong International Archery Championships, after the men's and women's teams defeat the Chinese Taipei and the China–Guangdong teams, respectively.
  - Ed Fajermo, a 1991 Southeast Asian Games gold medalist, wins the over-all title in the 6-day Boracay International Funboard Cup; becoming the first Filipino winner in the cup's nine-year history.
  - Filipino boxers defeat Australian opponents in their respective matches. Junior lightweight Ian Fajardo wins unanimously over Karim Nasher, so as Tiger Ari in the lightweight class over champion Tony Miller.
- February 20 – Gerry Peñalosa defeats defending champion Hiroshi Kawashima of Japan in their boxing match in Tokyo, winning the WBC super flyweight title through a unanimous decision.
- May 17 – Luisito Espinosa retains the WBC featherweight title after defeating Mexican challenger Manuel Medina in Rizal Park in Manila.
- June 14 – Gerry Peñalosa defeats challenger Seung Koo-Lee of South Korea, retaining his WBC super flyweight title.
- October 19 – The 19th Southeast Asian Games in Jakarta, Indonesia, ends with the Philippine team placing fourth with 43 gold, 57 silver and 109 bronze medals.
- November 10 – The Philippine Racing Commission declares a state of emergency in the local horse racing industry and cancels all the races due to the equine influenza epidemic which has affected nearly 90% of the race horse population and later kills at least 18. As a result, on November 26, the commission suspends horse races, effective until mid-December.
- December 7 – The Asia Pacific Motocross Championship, organized by the National Motorcycle Sports and Safety Association and sanctioned by the Fédération Internationale de Motocyclisme, is held in Marikina; the country's first hosting of such international event.
- December 20 – Joseph Oncada sets a record in downhill mountain biking at the Philippine National Games, standing at 54.06 seconds, faster than both his old national record set at the Asian Cycling Championships in October and the Asian record set by Tsukanato Takashi of Japan.

== Births ==
=== January ===
- January 12 – Felip, singer-songwriter, rapper, dancer, producer, and member of SB19
- January 20 – Kim Last, actor and member of That's My Bae
- January 28 – Arthur Nery, singer and songwriter

=== February ===
- February 3 – Rhap Salazar, singer, songwriter and actor
- February 15 – Kit Thompson, actor
- February 19 – Justine Baltazar, basketball player

=== March ===
- March 10 – Julia Barretto, actress
- March 13 – Lou Yanong, actress and model
- March 16 – Roxie Smith, actress, model, endorser, event and television presenter, and beauty pageant titleholder

=== April ===
- April 3 – RK Ilagan, basketball player
- April 7 – Quinley Quezada, footballer
- April 29 – Sara Eggesvik, footballer

=== May ===
- May 1 – Miles Ocampo, actress
- May 6:
  - Maymay Entrata, model, singer, composer, dancer and actress
  - Ranz Kyle, YouTube personality and dancer
- May 17 – Vinny Marcos, socialite and engineer
- May 25 – Ahtisa Manalo, beauty pageant titleholder and actress

=== June ===
- June 10 – Ser Geybin, vlogger and YouTuber
- June 17:
  - Jameson Blake, actor and member of Hashtags
  - Wilbert Ross, actor, singer, dancer, and member of Hashtags

=== July ===
- July 2 – Jackie Buntan, Muay Thai kickboxer
- July 20 – Meryll Serrano, footballer
- July 29 – Mathew Custodio, footballer
- July 31:
  - Barbie Forteza, actress and dancer
  - EJ Laure, volleyball player

=== August ===
- August 5 – Jeremiah Tiangco, singer
- August 16 – Angela Beard, footballer

=== September ===
- September 9 – Ian Pangilinan, actor and singer
- September 14 – Iñigo Pascual, actor and singer
- September 16 – Julian Trono, actor
- September 19 – Kobe Paras, basketball player
- September 22 – Maris Racal, actress, singer and dancer

=== October ===
- October 2 – Liezel Lopez, actress
- October 7:
  - Joshua Garcia, actor
  - J. Rey Soul, singer
- October 12 – Jimboy Martin, actor and member of Hashtags
- October 14 – Olivia McDaniel, footballer
- October 16 – Leila Alcasid, singer-songwriter and actress
- October 20 – Nicole Dulalia, actress
- October 22 – Kiara Takahashi, actress
- October 27 – Paulo Angeles, actor and member of Hashtags

=== November ===
- November 3 – Renee Co, lawyer and politician
- November 4 – Bea Binene, actress, broadcast journalist and television host
- November 28 – Claire Ruiz, actress

=== December ===
- December 4 – Ruru Madrid, actor
- December 17 – Jazz Ocampo, actress
- December 15 – Celeste Cortesi, actress and beauty pageant titleholder
- December 18 – Mikee Quintos, actress and singer

== Deaths ==
- February 4 – Benjamin de Jesus, Jolo-based Roman Catholic bishop
- February 7 – Jose Garcia Villa, Filipino poet, writer and painter, National Artist of the Philippines (b. 1908)
- February 14 – Miguel Rodriguez, actor (b. 1962)
- April 6 – Max Alvarado, actor (b. 1929)
- April 21 – Diosdado Macapagal, former President of the Philippines (b. 1910)
- June 27 – Cesar Alzona, former author (b. 1926)
- July 2 – Chiquito, comic actor (b. 1928)
- July 7 – Rolando Tinio, filipino poet, dramatist, actor, essayist, and educator (b. 1937)
- October 7 – Felicisimo Ampon, tennis player (b. 1920)
- October 10 – Dencio Padilla, actor-comedian (b. 1929)
