= 1993 in the Philippines =

- Decades: 1970s; 1980s; 1990s; 2000s; 2010s
- See also: List of years in the Philippines; films

1993 in the Philippines details events of note that happened in the Philippines in the year 1993.

== Incumbents ==
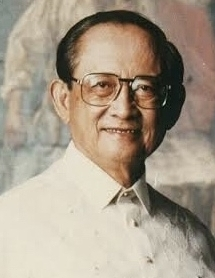
Fidel V.
Ramos

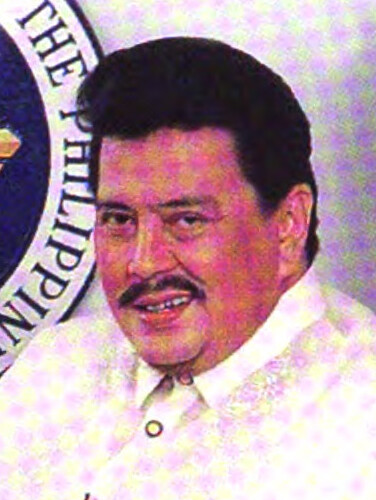
Joseph E.
Estrada

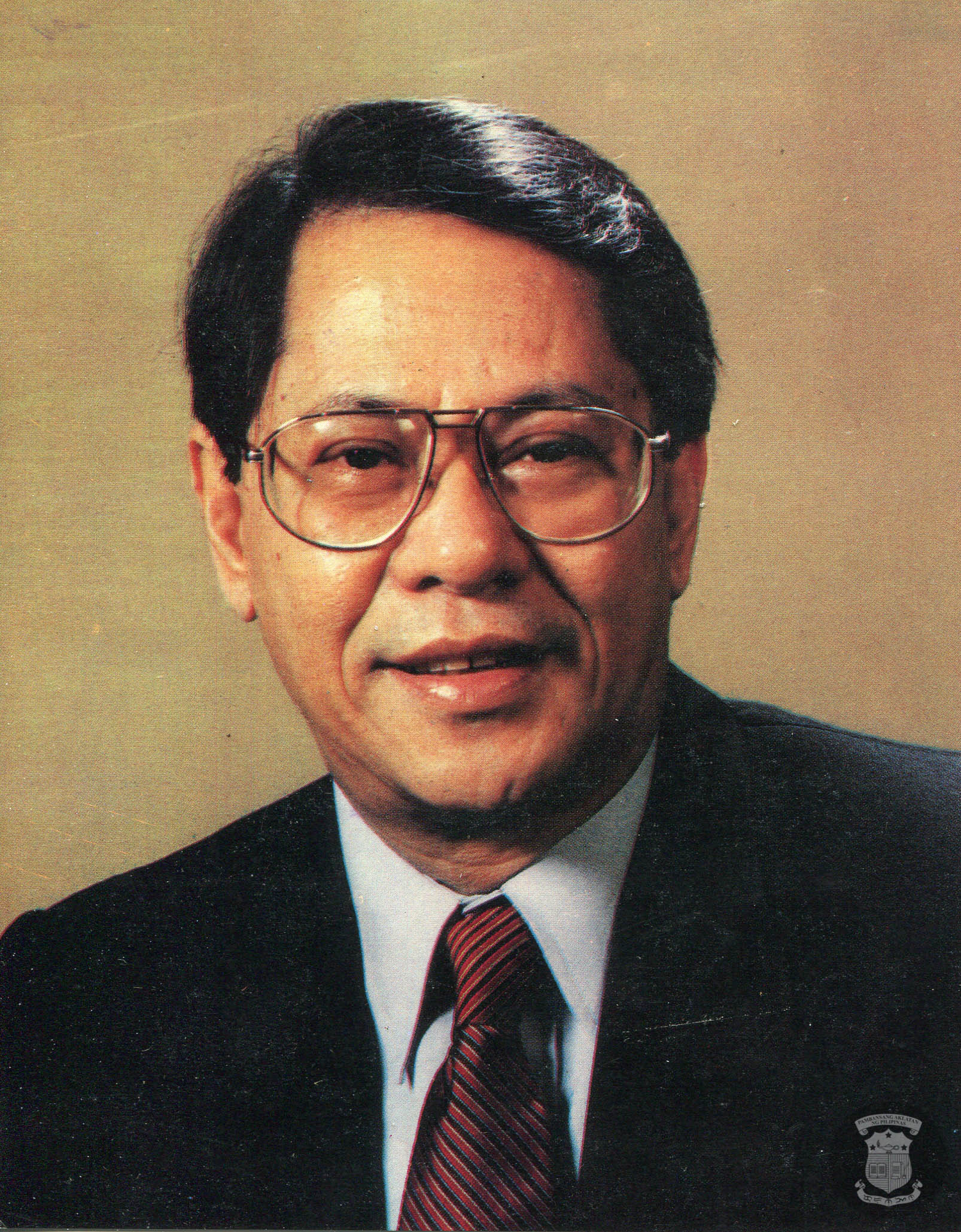
Edgardo J.
Angara

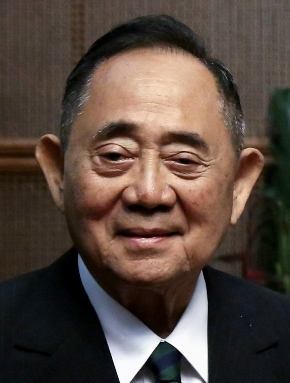
Jose C.
de Venecia Jr.

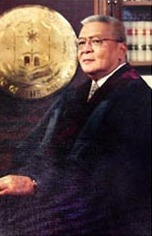
Andres D.
Narvasa

- President: Fidel Ramos (Lakas)
- Vice President: Joseph Estrada (NPC)
- Senate President:
  - Neptali Gonzales (until January 18)
  - Edgardo Angara (starting January 18)
- House Speaker: Jose de Venecia, Jr.
- Chief Justice: Andres Narvasa
- Philippine Congress: 9th Congress of the Philippines

== Events ==
=== January ===
- January 5 – A state of public calamity is declared in Davao Oriental and Surigao del Sur due to torrential rains and heavy flooding.
- January 10 – A state of calamity is declared in Malita, Don Marcelino and Jose Abad Santos in Davao del Sur due to heavy rains on the previous day that results to floods.

=== February ===
- February 2 – Mayon volcano in Albay begins to erupt, spewing ash and 10-kilometer high steam. Volcanic landslides also occur. Until March 20, 72 people are reported killed; with 118 others injured and 25 missing. On February 3, the entire province is placed under a state of public calamity.
- February 2 and 7 – A state of public calamity is declared in the eastern part of Northern Mindanao (Agusan del Norte, Agusan del Sur, Surigao del Norte; and the cities of Butuan and Surigao) due to torrential rains and heavy flooding.
- February 9 – About 200 suspected guerrillas of the separatist Moro National Liberation Front kill 29 troops of a platoon in an ambush in Tuburan, Basilan.
- February 10 – A state of calamity is declared in Southern Leyte due to heavy rains that has flooded ten of its municipalities.
- February 17 – Alfredo de Leon, a renegade communist who has been the suspected leader of the Red Scorpion Gang and the country's most wanted kidnapper, is killed in a police raid in his residence in Calumpit, Bulacan. The operation breaks up the country's largest kidnapping organization which has been involved in about a hundred kidnappings and bank robberies since 1989.
- February 21 – A state of public calamity is declared in Basilan due to military operations against the Moro National Liberation Front rebels.

=== March ===
- March 5 – A state of public calamity is declared in Aparri, Cagayan due to a cold spell that has killed at least 25 people.
- March 21 – A convoy onboard Vice President Estrada, also the chairperson of the Presidential Anti-Crime Commission, is ambushed by suspected renegade communist rebels near Santo Tomas, Batangas, injuring two policemen.
- March 29:
  - A state of calamity is declared in the city of San Pablo and the municipalities of Nagcarlan and Rizal, all in Laguna, due to a fish kill that has affected six lakes in the province.
  - A state of calamity is declared in Gumaca, Quezon due to a conflagration in the municipality on March 1.

=== April ===
- April 5 – The Congress approves Republic Act No. 7648 (Electric Power Crisis Act), granting special emergency powers to President Ramos to resolve a nationwide energy crisis that has been occurring since 1991, particularly daily power outages which began on October 1, 1992.
- April 24 – The entire leadership of the Philippine National Police, including 23 generals, is dismissed for corruption.

=== May ===
- Early May – President Ramos partially opens the diesel-fired Batangas Power Plant in an attempt to end the power crisis.
- May 11 – A Taiwanese businessman is abducted by an unidentified, newly-formed kidnap-for-ransom gang in Metro Manila. He is brought to Laguna and is released on May 17 after a ransom is paid in Hong Kong. Police later believes that the gang has international links and flees Manila thereafter.
- May 14 – A firewall at the Guzman Institute of Technology building, damaged by a fire in December 1992 and being demolished, collapses onto an estimated 20 houses in Quiapo, Manila, killing at least 12 people and injures about 29 others; with almost 20 reported trapped. Two days later, criminal charges are filed against the contractor who is in charge of the demolition.
- May 21 – The Supreme Court upholds another ruling by the Court of Appeals which has favored the civil suits filed by residents of Norzagaray, Bulacan, against the National Power Corporation; thus eventually finding the latter liable in connection with the flooding of the municipality during Typhoon Kading in 1978, which was purportedly caused by the release of water from Angat Dam.

=== June ===
- June 23–27 – Typhoon Goring causes massive damage to the provinces in Northern and Central Luzon, leaving 51 people dead, 5 missing, 109 injured and ₱2.775 billion in damages.
- June 28 – University of the Philippines Los Baños students, Eileen Sarmenta and Allan Gomez, are abducted by the men of Calauan, Laguna mayor Antonio Sanchez, later killed and found dead the following day. Sanchez is arrested on Aug. 13; with his six henchmen, would be convicted in 1995.

=== July ===
- July 2 – An overcrowded barge carrying pagoda sinks on the Bocaue river during an annual religious festival in Bocaue, Bulacan. Official death toll is 315 including 30 missing; although some reports ranging it from more than 260 up to 326. It is the country's deadliest accident involving river procession.
- July 6 – President Ramos declares a state of public calamity in the entire Ilocos and Cordillera Administrative Regions, and the provinces of Aurora, Cagayan, Isabela, Nueva Ecija (including the cities of Cabanatuan and Palayan), Nueva Vizcaya, Quezon and Quirino, which have been affected by Typhoon Goring.
- July 8 – In New York, United States, a district court sentences mercenary Robert Steele to a 7-year prison term on the bank secrecy charge and a 5-year probation on the arms violation, after pleading guilty in connection to a failed plan in early 1986 to overthrow the government of Corazon Aquino, who ousted president Ferdinand Marcos. Steele was hired by Marcos to carry out the plot.
- July 19 – The national government and the Marcos family announce agreeing to the planned return to the country of the body of former President Marcos, who died in exile in Hawaii, United States, in 1989. However, the interment would be held in his hometown in Ilocos Norte instead of Manila.
- July 22 – A state of public calamity is declared in General Santos due to torrential rains and flash floods.
- July 23 – A state of calamity in connection to a massacre in Tungawan, Zamboanga del Sur, is declared, which was later applied to the said municipality.
- July 27 – President Ramos declares a state of calamity in the coastal areas of Metro Manila and the provinces of Bataan, Bulacan, Cavite and Pampanga, due to the recurrence of red tide and infestation in Manila Bay.

=== September ===
- September 7–10 – In Ilocos Norte, the remains of former president Marcos arrive in Laoag International Airport, being held as part of an earlier deal. His body is then brought to Laoag Cathedral and the provincial capitol, both also in Laoag. Three days later, he is entombed in a family mausoleum in Batac, lying in state until 2016.
- September 24 – The Sandiganbayan convicts former first lady Imelda Marcos and former transport minister Jose Dans of two graft charges, each having prison terms of 9–12 years, and acquits them of three other charges; all involving five contracts in which the state-run Light Rail Transit Authority awarded property leases to the Philippine General Hospital Foundation. It is both the first concluded trial and conviction for Marcos' alleged corruption that linked to her husband's presidency. However, the two remain free on bail; and in 1998, the Supreme Court would acquit Marcos by overturning the judgment on appeal.

=== October ===
- Early October – The national government tentatively agrees to drop fraud charges against Westinghouse Electric Corporation in exchange for power-generating equipment, in an effort to end a decade-long dispute over a nuclear power plant which was eventually mothballed after the ouster of President Marcos. Earlier in May, the company has been cleared of charges of bribery in relation to the contract with the Marcos administration.
- October 1 – A state of calamity is declared in eleven municipalities in Maguindanao (Ampatuan, Buluan, Datu Paglas, Datu Piang, Dinaig, Kabuntalan, Maganoy, Pagalungan, Pendatun, Sultan sa Barongis, Talayan) and in Lambayong, Sultan Kudarat, in connection with the overflowing of the Allah River and Rio Grande de Mindanao.
- October 7 – The musical Les Misérables opens at Meralco Theater.
- October 8 – A state of calamity is declared in Pagadian, Zamboanga del Sur, due to a large fire that has hit the city's commercial district.
- October 18 – President Ramos declares a state of public calamity in the provinces of Aurora, Bataan, Bulacan, Batanes, Pampanga, Pangasinan, Tarlac, Zambales; the cities of Angeles and San Jose; and few municipalities in Metro Manila (Marikina and Navotas) and Rizal (Rodriguez and San Mateo); due to massive flooding caused due to Tropical Storm Kadiang.

=== November ===
- November 9 – A state of calamity is declared in Columbio, Sultan Kudarat, which has been affected by the harassment of armed men, resulting in the deaths of four persons and injuries of 18 others, with one reported missing.

=== December ===
- December 3 – A state of calamity is declared in Kalingalan Caluang, Sulu, which has been affected by the armed conflict between two clans.
- December 6–8 – President Ramos declares a state of public calamity in the provinces of Albay, Batangas, Camarines Norte, Camarines Sur, Catanduanes, Cavite, Laguna, Marinduque, Mindoro Occidental, Mindoro Oriental and Quezon; the cities of Batangas, Cavite, Iriga, Legazpi, Lipa, Lucena, Naga, San Pablo, Tagaytay and Trece Martires; and the municipalities of Abuyog and Mahaplag in Leyte; due to the impact of Typhoon Lola (Monang).
- December 11–12 – Typhoon Manny hits Visayas and southern Luzon, killing 67.
- December 13 – President Ramos signs a law restoring the death penalty for thirteen crimes including plunder. The death penalty, last imposed in the country in the 1970s, was abolished in the 1987 Constitution.
- December 14 – A state of calamity is declared in nine municipalities (Cuartero, Dao, Dumarao, Ma-ayon, Mambusao, Panitan, Pilar, Pontevedra, and Sigma) in Capiz due to the impact of typhoon Saling.
- December 15 – A C-130 military plane crashes into a hill and explodes in Libmanan, Camarines Sur; out of about 30 people on board, twenty-four bodies are retrieved from the crash site.
- December 23 – President Ramos declares a state of public calamity in the provinces of Masbate, Northern Samar, Romblon and Sorsogon due to the impact of typhoon Naning.
- December 24 – A grenade attack at a public market in Ozamiz, Misamis Occidental, kills 5 individuals and injures 47–48 others.
- December 26–28 – Four separate grenade attacks occur in Davao City. The first one, during an evening mass at San Pedro Cathedral, kills 6–7 people and injures more than 130 others. In the following two days, three mosques are likewise attacked, injuring six in the second one.

== Holidays ==
As per Executive Order No. 292, chapter 7 section 26, the following are regular holidays and special days, approved on July 25, 1987. Note that in the list, holidays in bold are "regular holidays" and those in italics are "nationwide special days".

- January 1 – **New Year's Day**
- February 25 – Anniversary of the 1986 EDSA Revolution
- April 8 – **Maundy Thursday**
- April 9:
  - **Good Friday**
  - **Araw ng Kagitingan** (Day of Valor)
- April 10 – Holy Saturday
- May 1 – **Labor Day**
- June 12 – **Independence Day**
- August 29 – **National Heroes Day**
- November 1 – All Saints Day
- November 2 – All Souls' Day
- November 30 – **Bonifacio Day**
- December 25 – **Christmas Day**
- December 30 – **Rizal Day**
- December 31 – Last Day of the Year

In addition, several other places observe local holidays, such as the foundation of their town. These are also "special days."

== Sports ==
- June 12–20 – The Philippines participates in the 1993 Southeast Asian Games.

== Television ==
Unknown

- Maskman on IBC-13
- Shaider on IBC-13
- Metalder on IBC-13
- Kamen Rider Black or Masked Rider Black on IBC-13
- Machineman on IBC-13
- Koseidon on ABS-CBN

(Premiere)

- Bioman on IBC-13
- Candy Crush on ABS-CBN

== Births ==
- January 4 – Marlo Mortel, actor
- January 17 – Ken Chan, actor and singer
- January 20 – Meg Imperial, actress
- January 25 – Kylie Padilla, actress and singer
- February 10 – Kevin Ingreso, football player
- February 11 – Marlann Flores, actress and comedienne
- February 12 – Mac Belo, basketball player
- February 13 – Nikko Natividad, members of Hashtags
- February 17 – AJ Perez, actor (d. 2011)
- February 19 – Empress Schuck, actress and commercial model
- March 18 – Leandro Leviste, businessman and politician
- March 26 – Kevin Ferrer, basketball player
- April 13 – Juancho Trivino, actor
- April 17 – Lauren Reid, actress and commercial model
- May 4 – Joyce Pring, television personality and host
- May 10 – Ian Tayao, singer
- May 11 – James Reid, actor and singer
- May 14 – Albie Casiño, actor
- May 20 – Devon Seron, member of Girltrends
- June 5 – Tsuyoshi Anthony Horibata, baseball player and politician
- June 18 – Arno Morales, actor
- June 20 – Jasmine Alkhaldi, swimmer
- June 29 – Alyssa Valdez, volleyball player
- July 12 – Scottie Thompson, basketball player
- July 22 − Toni Fowler, actress, singer and social media personality
- September 1 – Arianne Bautista, actress and commercial model
- September 12 – Myla Pablo, volleyball player
- September 23 – Lloyd Cadena, vlogger, radio personality, and author (d. 2020)
- September 26 – Dindin Santiago-Manabat, volleyball player
- September 29 – Teejay Marquez, actor
- September 30 – Kim Fajardo, volleyball player
- October 9:
  - Sarah Lahbati, actress
  - Jhoana Marie Tan, actress
- October 10 – Paolo Onesa, singer
- October 12 – Carl John Barrameda, actor
- October 16 – Jovit Baldivino, singer (d. 2022)
- October 27 – Kiefer Ravena, basketball player
- October 31 – Nadine Lustre, singer-actress
- November 4 – Moira Dela Torre, singer
- November 8 – Lauren Young, actress
- November 13 – Maria dela Cruz, football player
- December 2 – Jak Roberto, actor
- December 8 – Yamyam Gucong, actor and comedian
- December 11 – Mikoy Morales, actor and singer
- December 19 – Katrina Guillou, footballer
- December 23 – Jessie Lacuna, swimmer

== Deaths ==
- February 25 – Mary Walter, actress (b. 1912)
- March 31 – Chichay, actress and comedian (b. 1918)
- May 25 – Rogelio Roxas, treasure hunter involved in a case surrounding Yamashita treasure
- May 26 – Fernando Lopez, Vice President of the Philippines (b. 1904)
- July 24 – Rene Requiestas, actor and comedian (b. 1957)
- August 27 – Richard Abelardo, director and visual effects artist (b. 1900)
- October 18 – Salvador P. Lopez, writer, journalist and diplomat (b. 1911)
- November 7 – Jon Hernandez, Filipino actor (b. 1969)
