= 1998 in the Philippines =

- Decades: 1970s; 1980s; 1990s; 2000s; 2010s
- See also: List of years in the Philippines; films

1998 in the Philippines details events of note that happened in the Philippines in the year 1998.

The year was also designated as the country's year-long 100th centennial anniversary of the Philippine Declaration of Independence, as known by its theme, "100 Kalayaan: Kayamanan ng Bayan (1898–1998)" (lit. transl. "100 Freedom: Treasure of the People (1898–1998)").

== Incumbents ==
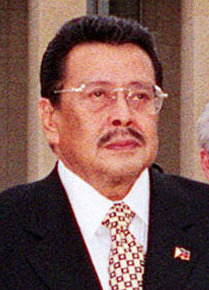
Joseph E.
Estrada

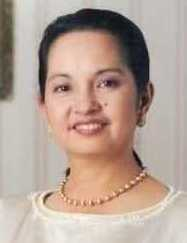
Gloria M. Macapagal
Arroyo

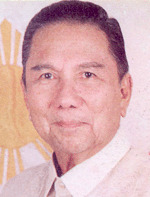
Marcelo B.
Fernan

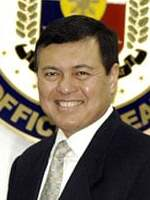
Manny B.
Villar Jr.

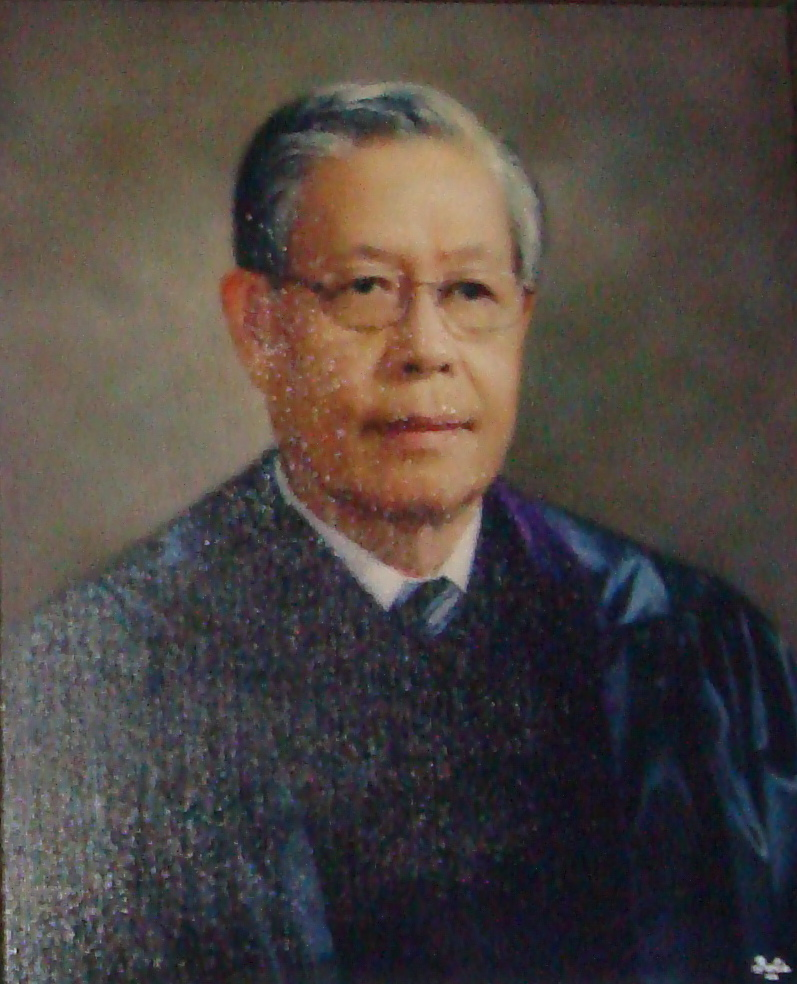
Hilario G.
Davide Jr.

- President
  - Fidel Ramos (Lakas) (until June 30)
  - Joseph Estrada (LAMMP) (starting June 30)
- Vice President
  - Joseph Estrada (LAMMP) (until June 30)
  - Gloria Macapagal Arroyo (Lakas) (starting June 30)
- Senate President
  - Ernesto Maceda (until January 26)
  - Neptali Gonzales (January 26 – June 30)
  - Marcelo Fernan (starting July 27)
- House Speaker
  - Jose de Venecia (until June 30)
  - Manny Villar (starting July 27)
- Chief Justice
  - Andres Narvasa (until November 30)
  - Hilario Davide (starting November 30)
- Philippine Congress
  - 10th Congress of the Philippines (until June 5)
  - 11th Congress of the Philippines (starting July 27)

== Events ==
=== January ===
- January 3 – A power interruption affects the entire Luzon for almost 7 hours, caused by a broken power line after a Meralco utility post has fallen in Laguna.

=== February ===
- February 2 – Cebu Pacific Flight 387 crashes on the slopes between Mount Sumagaya and Mount Lumot in Claveria, Misamis Oriental, killing all 104 people on board. It is once considered as the country's worst air accident since 1964, before another one to happen in 2000.
- February 11 – Talisay becomes a component city in the province of Negros Occidental through ratification of Republic Act 8489.
- February 14 – Santiago's independent component city status is downgraded through the enactment of Republic Act 8528 which amended certain sections of Republic Act 7720 into a component city in the province of Isabela.
- February 23 – Republic Act 8535 creating the City of Novaliches is signed into law.
- Late February to early March – A malaria outbreak in two islands in Siasi, Sulu causes the reported deaths of more than 140 residents.

=== March ===
- March 7
  - Majority of voters in the Cordillera Administrative Region reject the creation of an autonomous region in the second plebiscite for their autonomy, as mandated by the Republic Act No. 8438, with Apayao as the only province to vote for it.
  - Samal becomes a component city in the province of Davao del Norte through ratification of Republic Act 8471.
  - Compostela Valley becomes a province in the region of Davao Region through ratification of Republic Act 8470 approved on January 30. The name of Davao changed back to Davao del Norte.
  - Tagum becomes a component city in the province of Davao del Norte through ratification of Republic Act 8472.
- March 14 – Passi becomes a component city in the province of Iloilo through ratification of Republic Act 8469.
- March 20 – San Fernando becomes a component city in the province of La Union through ratification of Republic Act 8509.
- March 21
  - Calapan becomes a component city in the province of Oriental Mindoro through ratification of Republic Act 8475.
  - Urdaneta becomes a component city in the province of Pangasinan through ratification of Republic Act 8480.
  - Victorias becomes a component city in the province of Negros Occidental through ratification of Republic Act 8488.
- March 22
  - Kidapawan becomes a component city in the province of Cotabato through ratification of Republic Act 8500.
  - Malaybalay becomes a component city in the province of Bukidnon through ratification of Republic Act 8490.
  - Parañaque becomes a highly urbanized city in Metro Manila through ratification of Republic Act 8507 which was approved on February 13.

=== April ===
- April 4 – Antipolo becomes a component city in the province of Rizal through ratification of Republic Act 8508.
- April 19 – Tarlac becomes a component city in the province of Tarlac through ratification of Republic Act 8593.

=== May ===
- May 11 – Synchronized national and local elections were held.
- May 16 – A fire guts the Lung Center of the Philippines, wherein at least 22 patients die, as well as the adjacent National Kidney and Transplant Institute, in Quezon City.

=== June ===
- June 6 – Carmela Arcolas–Gamboa of Negros Occidental, was crowned Miss Philippines Centennial 1998.
- June 12 – The Philippines celebrates the centennial of its independence.
- June 30 – Former vice president Joseph Estrada is sworn in as the 13th president of the Philippines, succeeding Fidel Ramos. Senator Gloria Macapagal Arroyo also sworn as tenth vice president of the Philippines as the latter's successor.
- June–September – Dry spell felt in 16 regions amid country's four-year growth, with ₱9 billion worth of agricultural damages.

=== July ===
- Early July – Department of Agriculture reports that the drought and pest infestation to crops in Southern Mindanao region between November 1997 and June 1998 have affected some 254,000 hectares of farmlands, have destroyed 360,037 metric tons of crops worth at least ₱2-billion; rice and corn lands are the severely damaged.

=== September ===
- September 18 – Passenger ferry MV Princess of the Orient, taking its Manila–Cebu route at the height of Typhoon Vicki (Gading), sinks at sea off Fortune Island, Nasugbu, Batangas; 150 are either reportedly dead or missing.
- September 23 – Philippine Airlines (PAL) suspends its operations for days effective midnight, as it has announced on Sept. 17 to "permanently" halt, as a result of the Asian financial crisis and industrial action by its unions. Two separate strikes have been staged, by approximately 600 pilots in June, on the claims of unfair labor practice and union-busting by PAL, affecting PAL's operations; and by almost 2,000 union members in July, following the June 15 retrenchment of about 5,000 employees as part of its measure to counter financial losses. Pres. Estrada has made a series of interventions in an effort to resolve the labor dispute until certain agreements are made between PAL Employees Association and the airline management. On Oct. 7, PAL partially resumes operations, as announced by Pres. Estrada, Sept. 28. Supreme Court would uphold in 2016 the dismissal of 24 PAL pilots, and in 2018 the retrenchment of some 1,400 cabin crew.
- September 29 – The Supreme Court unanimously rejects the appeal of convicted rapist Alex Bartolome, paving the way for his execution in January 2000. Bartolome was the last prisoner to be executed in the Philippines.

=== October ===
- October 6 – Supreme Court votes, 8–5, to acquit former First Lady Imelda Marcos and to reverse a 1993 Sandiganbayan verdict convicting her of graft in connection with the construction of the Philippine General Hospital.
- October 14 – 15 – Super typhoon Zeb (Iliang) landfalls in Isabela and lashes through Northern Luzon as well as parts of Nueva Ecija and Rizal; causing massive damages worth around a billion pesos; reported death toll is 83.
- October 21 – 23 – Super typhoon Babs (Loleng) landfalls in Catanduanes and Aurora and rampages across Metro Manila and provinces in Central and Southern Luzon, Eastern Visayas, Negros as well as Baguio and parts of Ilocos Sur; confirmed death toll is 221; damages cost around ₱3-billion in total.

=== December ===
- December 3 – A fire devastates private orphanage Bahay Kalinga, run by women's organization Asociacion de Damas de Filipinas Inc., in Paco, Manila, with at least 30 people confirmed dead, mostly children who have been admitted there.
- December 18 – An encounter between Abu Sayyaf founding leader and the country's most wanted outlaw, Abdurajak Janjalani, with 20 rebels, and the 12-member government forces, occurred in Lamitan, Basilan; Janjalani and two of his men are killed, while two government men are killed and two are reported missing.
- December 30 – Valenzuela becomes a highly urbanized city in Metro Manila through ratification of Republic Act 8526.

== Holidays ==
As per Executive Order No. 292, chapter 7 section 26, the following are regular holidays and special days, approved on July 25, 1987. Note that in the list, holidays in bold are "regular holidays" and those in italics are "nationwide special days".

- January 1 – **New Year's Day**
- April 9:
  - **Maundy Thursday**
  - **Araw ng Kagitingan** (Day of Valor)
- April 10 – **Good Friday**
- May 1 – **Labor Day**
- June 12 – **Independence Day**
- August 30 – **National Heroes Day**
- November 1 – All Saints Day
- November 30 – **Bonifacio Day**
- December 25 – **Christmas Day**
- December 30 – **Rizal Day**
- December 31 – Last Day of the Year

In addition, several other places observe local holidays, such as the foundation of their town. These are also "special days."

== Sports ==
- January 17 – The Tanduay Gold Rhum Masters achieves their 6th title of the PBL after their winning against AGFA HDC Films in Game 5 of the 1998 PBL All-Filipino Cup Finals, 82–76.
- March 7 – The Inauguration games of the Metropolitan Basketball Association is held at Don Narciso Ramos Sports Complex in Lingayen, Pangasinan.
- May 8 – The Alaska Milkmen regains the 1998 PBA All-Filipino Cup crown with a 4–3 series victory against the San Miguel Beermen and repeated as back-to-back title, Alaska winning their 8th PBA title.
- July 6 – The Tanduay Centennial Rhum Masters are crowned as the PBL Basketball champions of the 1998 Yakult PBL Centennial Cup after beating Batang Red Bull in the Game 3 of the finals series, 71–65. and also breaking its seventh title drought.
- August 14 – The Alaska Milkmen wins their 9th straight PBA title, defeating the San Miguel Beermen for the second time in the season, winning in six games.
- October 6 – The Mobiline Phone Pals wins the PBA Centennial Cup title, defeating the Formula Shell Super Unleaded in winning the overtime 67–66.
- October 31 – The Pampanga Dragons wins as the first MBA champions, winning against Negros Slashers 4–1. The Dragons clinch the first MBA national championship.
- December 6 – 20 – The **Philippines** participates in the 1998 Asian Games held in Bangkok, Thailand The country ranks 21st with one gold medal, five silver medals and 12 bronze medals with a total of 18 over-all medals.
- December 9 – Formula Shell Super Unleaded wins their third PBA title and their first in six years, with a 4–3 series victory over the Mobiline Phone Pals.

== Births ==
- January 4 – Liza Soberano, actress
- January 10 – Ayra Mariano, actress
- January 24 – JC Alcantara, actor
- February 3 – James Teng, actor
- February 4 – Chandler McDaniel, football player
- February 10 – Donny Pangilinan, actor
- February 24 – Mariel Pamintuan, actress
- March 11 – Rhenz Abando, basketball player
- March 14 – Elaine Duran, singer
- March 21 – Buboy Villar, actor
- March 27 – BJ Forbes, actor
- March 30 – Janella Salvador, actress
- April 16 – Paul Salas, actor
- May 15 – Kokoy de Santos, actor, singer, dancer and commercial model
- May 18 – Eunice Lagusad, actress and vlogger
- May 22:
  - Kath Arado, volleyball player
  - Malupiton, social media personality and content creator
- May 25 – Ricci Rivero, actor and basketball player
- May 28 – Luis Gabriel Moreno, archer and Youth Olympic Games medalist
- June 3 – Markus Paterson, actor
- June 22 – Maureen Wroblewitz, Asia's Next Top Model winner and TV co-host
- June 27 – Tomas Rodriguez, actor and singer
- July 7 – Tots Carlos, volleyball player
- July 16 – Carlo Paalam, boxer
- July 25 – Paolo Gumabao, actor and model
- July 27 – Javi Gómez de Liaño, basketball player
- August 1 – Barbie Imperial, actress
- August 17 – Gel Cayuna, volleyball player
- August 19 – Ella Guevara, actress
- August 21 – Prince Villanueva, actor
- August 25 – Maz Pacheco, football player
- August 23 – Russell Reyes, member of BoybandPH
- August 24 – Sofia Andres, actress
- September 1 – Argel Saycon, actor
- September 2 – Dwight Ramos, basketball player
- September 6 – Angel Guardian, actress
- September 12 – Kiko Barzaga, politician
- September 21:
  - Charisa Lemoran, football and futsal player
  - Miguel Tanfelix, actor
- October 10 – Nash Aguas, actor
- November 10:
  - Claudine Co, singer and influencer
  - Renz Valerio, actor
- November 22 – Jane de Leon, actress
- November 28 – Jeremiah Lisbo, actor
- December 2 – Gabbi Garcia, actress and endorser
- December 9 – Mika Dela Cruz, actress
- December 11 – Zeinab Harake, vlogger
- December 26 – Ashley Ortega, actress

== Deaths ==
- January 9 – Charito Solis, actress (b. 1935)
- January 14 – Arturo Enrile, Secretary of Transportation and Communications and former Chief of Staff of the Armed Forces of the Philippines (b. 1940)
- April – Pancho Magalona, Philippine actor (b. 1921)
- June 11 – Leopoldo Salcedo, actor (b. 1912)
- August 27 – Babalu, actor and comedian (b. 1942)
- September 1 – Francisco Coching, Filipino comic books illustrator and writer (b. 1919)
- September 4 – Willy Garte, singer (b. 1961/1962)
- September 6 – Ric Segreto, recording artist (b. 1952)
- October 9 – Anthony Alonzo, Filipino actor and politician (b. 1948)
- October 23 – Adrian Gonzales, Filipino comic book artist (b. 1937)
- November 21 – Gen. Fabian Ver, former Chief of Staff of the Armed Forces of the Philippines.
- December 17 – Alberto Jover Piamonte, fourth Archbishop of Jaro in the Philippines (b. 1934)
- December 18 – Abdurajak Abubakar Janjalani, chief founder and leader of Abu Sayyaf (b. 1959)

=== Unknown date ===
- Mariano Tolentino, Olympic Basketball Player (b. 1928)
- Manuel C. Herrera, Filipino judge (b. 1924)
