= 1996 in the Philippines =

- Decades: 1970s; 1980s; 1990s; 2000s; 2010s
- See also: List of years in the Philippines; films

1996 in the Philippines details events of note that happened in the Philippines in the year 1996.

== Incumbents ==
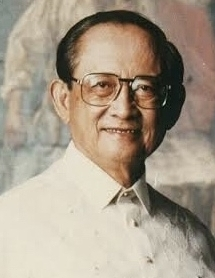
Fidel V.
Ramos

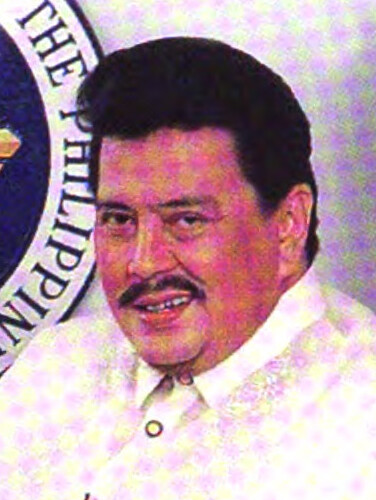
Joseph E.
Estrada

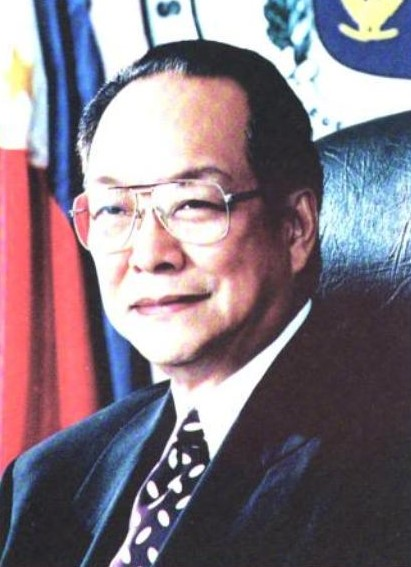
Ernesto M.
Maceda Sr.

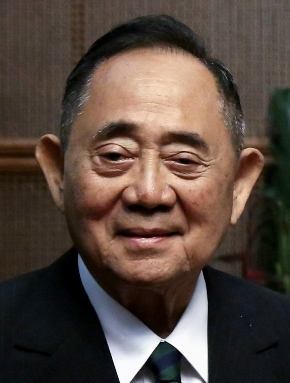
Jose C.
de Venecia Jr.

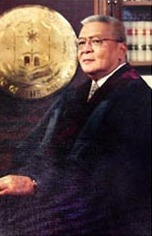
Andres D.
Narvasa

- President: Fidel Ramos (Lakas)
- Vice President: Joseph Estrada (NPC)
- Senate President
  - Neptali Gonzales (until October 10)
  - Ernesto Maceda (starting October 10)
- House Speaker: Jose de Venecia, Jr.
- Chief Justice: Andres Narvasa
- Philippine Congress: 10th Congress of the Philippines

== Events ==
=== January ===
- Production of oil at West Linapacan, then the country's largest oilfield, stops due to increasing water in its wells.
- January 14 – President Ramos orders a nationwide crackdown on police and military personnel being under the influence of drugs, and suspected drug lords.
- January 22 – A 90-minute evening shootout takes place between a Philippine Navy gunboat and two Chinese vessels entering the country's territorial waters in the South China Sea off Capones Island in Zambales. The skirmish will become public four days later, with the involvement of the government of China in the incident being denied and no diplomatic protest filed. It is the first violent incident involving the two nations since the 1995 confrontation of their navies near Mischief Reef in the Spratly Islands.
- January 23 – A mass wedding is held by South Korea-based religious group Holy Spirit Association for the Unification of World Christianity at the Philippine International Convention Center in Manila, and is participated by 984 couples, mostly Filipino women and Korean men, amid allegations by authorities that the group has been involved in illegal recruitment of women.

=== February ===
- February 10 – Navy patrol gunboats exchange fire with a suspected Chinese vessel entering the country's waters off Zambales. The latter, along with its 20 crew, later surrenders. The encounter is the second such incident in the area.
- February 14 – At an air base in Puerto Princesa, Palawan, the police clashes violently with about a thousand Vietnamese asylum seekers, having stormed out of a refugee camp to protest the voluntary return to Vietnam of 84 citizens. As early as February 8, security forces have stormed the Philippine First Asylum Camp in an attempt to forcibly repatriate refugees, later causing tensions. The camp has been closed in 1995 and its United Nations funding would be cut off in June; as up to 2,500 "boat people" have been failed to qualify as political refugees. A day after the incident, the national government halts its forced repatriation policy due to the opposition from the Catholic Church.
- February 18 – Overcrowded ferry ML Gretchen I, traveling from Cebu, overturns and sinks at the entrance to the port of Cadiz, Negros Occidental; by the end of the month, fifty-one people are reported killed. It happens when passengers shifted to one side to avoid high waves.

=== March ===
- March 18 – Fire breaks out at the Ozone Disco Pub in Quezon City, packed with hundreds, mostly school graduates. More than 150 people are killed. It is the country's worst fire and one of the world's worst nightclub fires.
- March 24 – A mining disaster occurs on the island province of Marinduque when the leftover mine tailings from the drainage of the Marcopper Mining Corporation are leaked into the river and spilled into the sea.

=== April ===
- April 17 – The Environment Department imposes a ban on the export of live monkeys and a quarantine on Ferlite Scientific Research that had shipped the monkeys to the United States on March 12, where the deaths of two of them in Texas are later found caused by a Reston virus. On April 29, the national government orders the quarantine on five monkey-breeding farms. The export ban is lifted on June 10 while Ferlite remains under quarantine.

=== June ===
- June 13 – Retired P/Col. Rolando Abadilla, intelligence officer during the Marcos administration, is assassinated in Quezon City. Communist Alex Boncayao Brigade claims responsibility. Five of the seven accused would be convicted in 1999.

=== July ===
- The Supreme Court upholds the death sentence for Leo Echegaray, who was convicted of rape in 1994 by a lower court. Echegaray is initially scheduled to be executed by lethal injection in Muntinlupa in July 1997.
- July 31 – Sarah Balabagan, a migrant worker sentenced and imprisoned in the United Arab Emirates for almost two years for killing her employer in self-defense, is freed. She returns to the country the next day.

=== August ===
- August 1 – Mabuhay, moves to its new orbital slot. Mabuhay satellite, previously named Palapa B-2P, was acquired by Mabuhay Philippines Satellite Corporation on an earlier date this year. Mabuhay became one to be owned by a Filipino entity.
- August 10 – Sagay becomes a component city in the province of Negros Occidental through ratification of Republic Act 8192.

=== September ===
- September 1–8 – An outbreak of cholera occurs in Manila, affecting Paco and San Andres and isolating 33 patients admitted to three hospitals. Five die due to severe dehydration.
- September 2 – A permanent peace agreement is signed by the national government and the Moro National Liberation Front at Malacañang Palace, concluding negotiations in Libya, Indonesia, and Mindanao, and ending the 26-year conflict in the southern islands.

=== October ===
- October 3 – A judicial court acquits San Ildefonso, Bulacan, mayor Honorato Galvez in relation to the murder of Alvin Vinculado and injuring of his brother.
- October 15 – The foreign department confirms the denial by Myanmar of visa application of former president Corazon Aquino following her remarks against the former's ruling junta in the United States four days earlier.
- October 24 – The national government bans José Ramos-Horta, an East Timorese resistance leader from Indonesia and Nobel Peace Prize winner, from entering the country by rejecting his visa application. Ramos-Horta has been invited by the leftist group Manila People's Forum as a keynote speaker in a November conference. It is the second time he has been banned since 1994.
- October 28 – Transport groups nationwide hold the Welgang Bayan to protest oil price hike and oil deregulation. However, only Makati, Las Piñas, Parañaque and Pateros in Metro Manila, as well as Bacolod, are affected by the strike.
- October 30 – The Philippine Airlines Employees Association, consisting of three labor unions, begins to go on the first of a series of strikes, resulting to cancellation of flights; continuing despite an ultimatum set on November 1 and until the month's first week as negotiations are later held. The strike is due to a labor dispute having been caused by the privatization of the airline by the Lucio Tan group in January 1995 and the employees' pending collective bargaining agreement.
- October 30–31 – In Cotabato City, business establishments are closed amid a general strike in protest over incidents of kidnap-for-ransom by the bandits.

=== November ===
- November 5 – A police raid in Tagaytay, Cavite, led by provincial governor Epimaco Velasco, results to the confiscation of more than 200 kilograms of shabu and heroin worth ₱800 million, becoming the largest drug bust since the 1972 arrest of Lim Seng. Hongkonger Wai Kuen Alan Tong (Lucky Lau), a suspected member of the 14K syndicate, is arrested for drug trafficking; while another escapes.
- November 6 – In Kuala Lumpur, Malaysia, the country's government bans RC Constantino, chairperson of militant group Sanlakas; with immigration authorities eventually deporting him after detaining him for 12 hours since arrival at Subang International Airport. Constantino is scheduled to attend the second Asia-Pacific Conference on East Timor (APCET) in relation to the area being occupied by Indonesia.
- November 9 – Forty-one inmates of the New Bilibid Prison in Muntinlupa begin to hold a hunger strike to demand an amnesty from the president. At least seven of the protesters are later hospitalized.
- November 11 – Eleven Filipino delegates to the APCET are likewise deported from Malaysia; almost all of them return to the country. They have been arrested by the police after about 400 members of the youth wing of the ruling United Malays National Organization break up the forum at the Kuala Lumpur Hotel; and then detained for two days.
- November 12 – Labor leader Filemon Lagman is arrested for murder in relation to the 1992 assassination of police intelligence officer Ibarra de Guzman, allegedly by the Alex Boncayao Brigade (ABB), in Marikina. While in detention, Lagman later goes on a hunger strike to protest his arrest; lasting for 12 days until November 27, when the Quezon City Regional Trial Court (RTC) rules his detention being illegal, leading to his release.
- November 22:
  - The APEC business forum begins.
  - President Ramos signs two bills into law—one on sin tax on beer and cigarettes effective in 1997; and another imposing stiffer penalties for holders of fake passports.
- November 23 — Security personnel recover explosives on a bridge in Manila, as the United States Secret Service foils a suspected assassination plot by the Al Qaeda on president Bill Clinton upon his arrival.
- November 24–25 – 8th Asia-Pacific Economic Cooperation (APEC) Summit is held in Subic, Zambales; the first time the country hosted the event.
- November 26 – Chinese and Filipino trade officials sign four agreements, including the continuation of operation of the Philippine Consulate in Hong Kong after the end of British colonization; the establishment of Consular Offices in Guangzhou and Cebu City; and the construction of two power plants in the country. This occurs during a 3-day state visit of Chinese president Jiang Zemin that lasts until November 28.
- November 27 – The police raids an alleged shabu laboratory in Parañaque where five Hongkongers, suspected members of the 14K gang, escape. It is the third major operation since President Ramos ordered a crackdown on drug trafficking in October.
- November 28 – The Manila RTC sentences Rommel Concepcion to life imprisonment for murder. Concepcion, who shot to death fellow student Jellico Gamilla during an alleged fraternity war in front of the Far Eastern University on July 14, 1994, has earlier been granted bail.
- November 29 – Senate president Maceda, in his privilege speech, reveals a ₱120-million land deal between the Public Estates Authority (PEA) and Amari Coastal Bay Development Corporation (ACBDC), which was signed by then PEA chairperson and transportation secretary Amado Lagdameo, citing numerous alleged violations including being underpriced. The deal is part of "Boulevard 2000", the government's plan to develop the Manila Bay area, which involves land reclamation; as Amari is said controlled by Thailand-based real estate company Ital-Thai. Massive investigations would later be launched.

=== December ===
- December 3 – A fire, considered the largest in Lipa, Batangas, hits an entire purok, caused by an explosion in a public market and resulting to massive damages.
- December 4 – The National Bureau of Investigation and the Presidential Security Group raid the national headquarters of COBSAF (Cool But Sure And Firm Foundation) in Intramuros, Manila, and arrest a couple and a pastor. COBSAF, initially a non-government organization, is later alleged illegally using the presidential seal and President Ramos in its operations.
- December 7 – Marikina becomes a highly urbanized city in Metro Manila through ratification of Republic Act 8223 which was approved on November 6.
- December 10 – The Supreme Court rejects a petition from the Presidential Commission on Good Government to keep five individuals appointed to the 15-member board of directors of the San Miguel Corporation, allowing former Marcos crony Danding Cojuangco to regain his shares, including the company, which were sequestered by the government after the 1986 ouster of president Ferdinand Marcos.
- December 13 – The police arrests Arnold Salazar, alleged ABB leader, in a drug bust in Cubao, Quezon City. Salazar has been suspected of killing Rey dela Cruz, barangay captain of Quiapo, Manila, and former police colonel Reynaldo Dino in 1990.
- December 20:
  - The Supreme Court, acting on a petition filed by senator Miriam Santiago, issues a temporary restraining order to PIRMA, suspending the signature campaign for constitutional amendment and lifting of term limits on elected officials, and barring the Commission on Elections from hearing the group's petition.
  - About 300 employees from German company Telefunken Microelectronics, led by leftist labor leader Filemon Lagman, barge into the premises of the Labor Department and take over the office of the secretary to demand their reinstatement at work amid a year-long dispute with their employer. The occupation lasts until December 31 when they are arrested and briefly detained by the police.
- December 30 – President Ramos signs four bills into law, including the final phase of the Salary Standardization Law, the increasing of the internal revenue allotments for local government units, the expansion of the Court of Appeals, and the extension of the Alien Social Integration Act for a year.

== Holidays ==
As per Executive Order No. 292, chapter 7 section 26, the following are regular holidays and special days, approved on July 25, 1987. Note that in the list, holidays in bold are "regular holidays" and those in italics are "nationwide special days".

- January 1 – **New Year's Day**
- April 4 – **Maundy Thursday**
- April 5 – **Good Friday**
- April 9 – **Araw ng Kagitingan** (Day of Valor)
- May 1 – **Labor Day**
- June 12 – **Independence Day**
- July 4 – 50th Anniversary of the Philippine-American Friendship Day (Through Proclamation No. 811, s. 1996)
- August 25 – **National Heroes Day**
- November 1 – All Saints Day
- November 30 – **Bonifacio Day**
- December 25 – **Christmas Day**
- December 30 – **Rizal Day**
- December 31 – Last Day of the Year

In addition, several other places observe local holidays, such as the foundation of their town. These are also "special days."

== Sports ==
- May 26 – The Alaska Milkmen defeats the Purefoods TJ Hotdogs, 93-92 in overtime to win the 1996 PBA All-Filipino Cup finals.
- July 19–August 4 – The Philippines participate in the 1996 Summer Olympics in Atlanta, Georgia, United States and rank 61st. Athlete Mansueto Velasco receives his silver medal and placed second in boxing.
- September 10 – The Alaska Milkmen wins against the Formula Shell Zoom Masters, grabbing their second championship for the season.
- November – Paeng Nepomuceno wins the 32nd Bowling World Cup in Northern Ireland—his fourth championship—after defeating Drew Hylen of the United States, 243–172. Nepomuceno has been listed in the Guinness Book of World Records as the first bowler to become the World Cup champion thrice. Bong Coo likewise joins the event.
- December – Golfers Tony Lascuna, Rey Pagunsan, and Richard Sinfuego defend the country's title in the Putra Cup, winning over Indonesia, with Lascuna winning the individual title.
- December 17 – The Alaska Milkmen wins the coveted grandslam, winning the series over Ginebra San Miguel, 4-1.

== Entertainment and culture ==
- November 23 – Alanis Morissette holds a concert at the Araneta Coliseum.
- December 8–10 – Michael Jackson's concert is held in Asiaworld in Parañaque. Jackson stays in the country on December 5–11.
- December 16 – Talent manager Lolit Solis is sentenced by a judicial court to two-year imprisonment after pleading guilty to estafa in relation to the 1994 Manila Film Festival scandal.

== Births ==
- January 3 – Calvin Oftana, basketball player
- January 4 – Joshua Colet, actor and model
- January 6 – Elisse Joson, actress and model
- January 10 – Joshua Pacio, mixed martial artist and current MMA World Champion
- January 15 – Julian Estrada, actor
- January 21 – Hannah Arnold, beauty queen
- January 22 – Khalil Ramos, actor and singer
- February 15 – Skusta Clee, rapper, member of Ex Battalion
- February 18 – Elle Villanueva, actress and model
- March 16 – Kaila Estrada, actress and model
- March 26 – Kathryn Bernardo, actress
- April 2 – Kib Montalbo, basketball player
- April 12 – Charlie Dizon, actress
- April 20 – Miggy Tolentino, actor and That's My Bae contestant
- May 10 – Anjo Damiles, actor
- May 14 – Jessica Villarubin
- May 21 – Jay Arcilla, actor
- June 1 – Dawn Macandili, volleyball player
- June 2 – Morissette, singer, songwriter, and actress
- June 9 – Marvelous Alejo, actress and singer
- June 30 – Sarina Bolden, footballer
- July 20 – Sue Ramirez, actress
- July 22 – Jane Oineza, actress
- July 23 – Viy Cortez, vlogger
- July 28 – Yasser Marta, actor
- August 9 – Sanya Lopez, actress
- August 13:
  - Thea Tolentino, actress
  - Eli San Fernando, labor leader and politician
- August 15:
  - Analyn Barro, actress
  - Flow G, rapper
- August 17 – Ella Cruz, actress
- August 24 – Faye Lorenzo, actress and model
- September 4 – Sisi Rondina, volleyball player
- September 8 – Krystal Reyes, actress and vlogger
- September 13 – CJ Navato, actor
- September 27 – Remedy Rule, swimmer
- October 17:
  - Nikki De Guzman, journalist
  - Karen Reyes, actress
- October 26 – Ronnie Alonte, actor and singer
- November 4 – Michael Christian Martinez, figure skater
- November 7:
  - Luke Gebbie, swimmer
  - Luigi Villafuerte, politician
- November 11 – Mimiyuuuh, vlogger
- November 14 – Rabiya Mateo, actress, model and beauty pageant titleholder
- December 5 – Sara Castañeda, footballer
- December 17 – Thirdy Ravena, basketball player
- December 22:
  - Makisig Morales, actor and singer
  - Joao Constancia, actor and member of BoybandPH
- December 25 – Ivana Alawi, actress and vlogger

== Deaths ==
- January 7 – Bienvenido Santos, Filipino-American fiction, poetry and nonfiction writer. (b. 1911)
- March 17 – Rey Cuenco, basketball player (b. 1960)
- June 2 – Ishmael Bernal, Filipino film, stage and television director, actor and screenwriter (b. 1938)
- August 11 – Ambrosio Padilla, basketball player and senator (b. 1910)
- September 18 – Tomás Cloma, lawyer and businessman (b. 1904)
- October 28 – Irene R. Cortes, Filipino judge (b. 1921)
- November 2 – Arnie Tuadles, basketball player (b. 1956)
- November 27 – Balot, comedian, film, television and stage actor (b. 1926)
