= 1999 in the Philippines =

- Decades: 1970s; 1980s; 1990s; 2000s; 2010s
- See also: List of years in the Philippines; films

1999 in the Philippines details events of note that happened in the Philippines in the year 1999.

== Incumbents ==
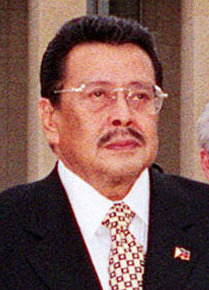
Joseph E.
Estrada

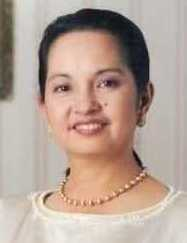
Gloria Macapagal
M. Arroyo

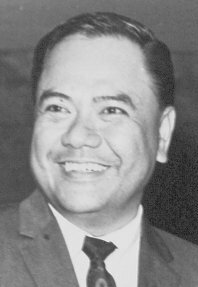
Blas F.
Ople

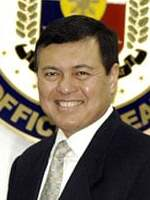
Manny B.
Villar Jr.

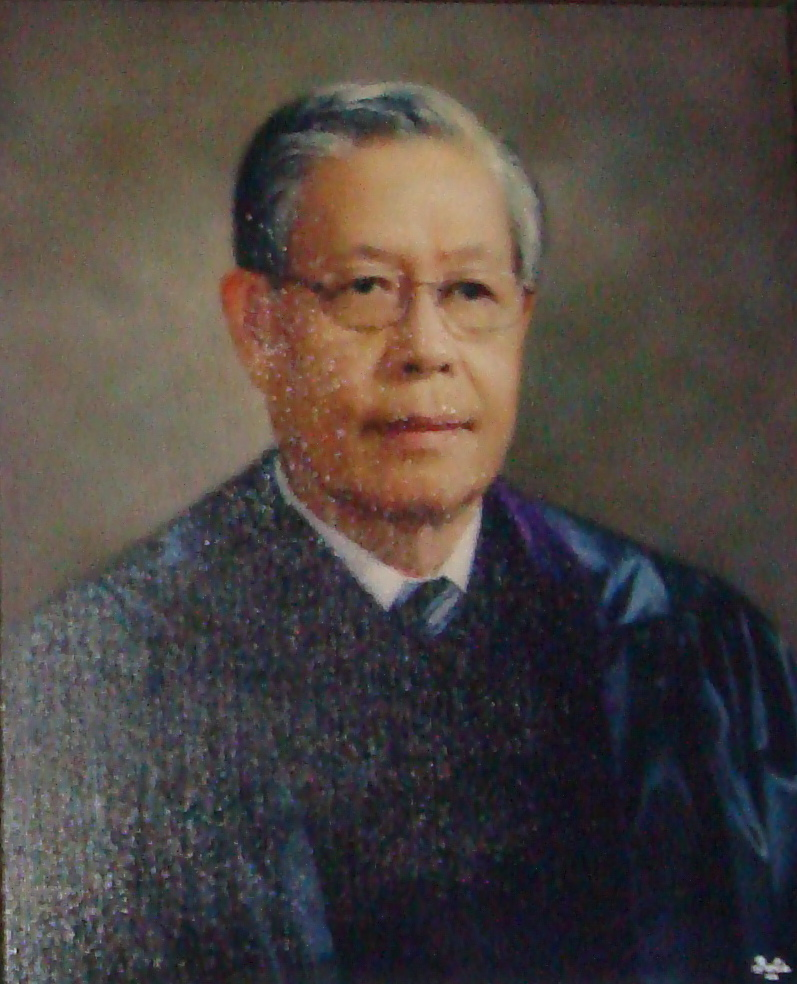
Hilario G.
Davide Jr.

- President: Joseph Estrada (LAMMP)
- Vice President: Gloria Macapagal Arroyo (Lakas)
- Senate President:
  - Marcelo Fernan (until June 28)
  - Blas Ople (starting June 29)
- House Speaker: Manuel Villar
- Chief Justice: Hilario Davide Jr.
- Philippine Congress: 11th Congress of the Philippines

== Events ==
=== January ===
- January – Diplomatic relations between Palau and the Philippines reach an all-time low with Palau President Kuniwo Nakamura threatening to sever diplomatic ties between his country and the Philippines over repeated crossing of Filipino fishers into Palau's EEZ.
- January 6 – A giant wave hits the wharf of Sitangkai, Tawi-Tawi, causing damages to properties and reported deaths of 18 people.
- January 19 – During a fluvial procession in Lumban, Laguna, a float hits an electric cable which later falls, causing devotees aboard to get either electrocuted or drowned as they jump into the river; 13 are confirmed dead, others are reported missing.
- January 20 – A passenger bus falls into a ravine after overshooting a sharp curve on Naguilian Road in Sablan, Benguet, killing 22 people.

=== February ===
- February 5 – Rape convict Leo Echegaray is executed by lethal injection at the National Penitentiary in Muntinlupa; becoming the first Filipino to be meted the sentence since the country's last public execution in 1976 and the reinstatement of the death penalty in 1993; also first execution by that method. Prior to this, on Jan. 19, the Supreme Court lifted the Temporary Restraining Order issued on Jan. 4, the day of his supposed execution, as the representatives submit to them their resolution, which has passed the same day, favoring the Death Penalty Law (Republic Act 7659).

=== March ===
- March 14 – Electorates of the municipality of Ilagan, in the province of Isabela turn down the cityhood law under the Republic Act 8474 which seeks to convert the town into a component city.

=== April ===
- April 15 – A bomb explosion in Batan Island, Rapu-Rapu, Albay reportedly kills at least 13 and injured more than 70 others.

=== May ===
- May 26 – Miriam Quiambao is proclaimed 1st runner-up in the Miss Universe 1999 pageant night was held in the Chaguaramas Convention Centre, Chaguaramas, Trinidad and Tobago.
- May 27 – New Visiting Forces Agreement (VFA) with the United States is ratified by the Senate, returning American military presence in the country.
- May 29 – The Manhunt International World Finals (1999) was held in Manila, Philippines. About 43 participants competed in this edition.

=== June ===
- June 22 – Mayon Volcano in Albay suddenly and shortly erupts, emitting ash as high as 7 to 10 kilometers; ashfalls are reported in Camalig; there are no casualties.

=== August ===
- August 3 – At least 58 people die and hundreds of homes are buried in a massive landslide in Cherry Hills subdivision in Antipolo, Rizal, which has caused by the heavy rains brought by Typhoon Olga (Ising).
- August 11 – A police officer and four others, all involved in the 1996 murder of former MISG chief and former Ilocos Norte Gov. Rolando Abadilla, are convicted by the Quezon City Regional Trial Court, another two are acquitted. In 2008, the Court of Appeals would reduce the death sentence, originally given to them, to reclusión perpetua; the Supreme Court would affirm the verdict in 2010.
- Mid-August to early September – Sixty-eight residents mysteriously died in Clark, Pampanga. In October, a task force reported that the deaths were caused by tons of toxic waste abandoned in the former US air base.
- August 20 – Former president Corazon Aquino and Cardinal Jaime Sin lead a rally on Ayala Avenue in Makati against the Constitutional Correction for Development, President Estrada's version of charter change.
- August 26 – An armed encounter between the Philippine Army soldiers and Moro Islamic Liberation Front (MILF) forces in Tipo-Tipo, Basilan kills at least 47 guerillas.

=== September ===
- September 15 – A landslide, triggered by heavy rains, buries a van with 18 people on board along Kennon Road in Tuba, Benguet, killing 17 of them.
- September 16 – The Supreme Court grants a petition declaring Republic Act 8528 unconstitutional which amended certain sections of Republic Act 7720, citing lack of plebiscite. Thus, the component city of Santiago in the province of Isabela is reverted to an independent component city. (Note: Event occurred Sept. 16 based on court records. At least another source states the date as late as Dec. 29; however, this information conflicts with the former.)

=== October ===
- October 23 – A plebiscite creating the city of Novaliches is held but the proposal is turned down by the electorate.
- October 31 – An overloaded jeepney plunges into the ravine in Itogon, Benguet, killing 21 passengers out of 34 people on board.

=== November ===
- November 4 – A bus falls into a ravine in Atok, Benguet, killing at least 19 people.
- November 18 – At least 32 die in separate clashes between MILF rebels and government troops in the provinces of Lanao del Sur and Maguindanao, a day after their declaration of a ceasefire.
- November 27–28 – ASEAN Informal Summit meeting is held in Manila.

=== December ===
- December 7 – Asian Spirit Flight 100 is crashed onto a mountainside between the municipalities of Kasibu, Nueva Vizcaya and Cabarroguis, Quirino, 17 passengers were killed.
- December 10–11 – A massive power failure hits the entire Luzon overnight, caused by an invasion of an estimated 50 tons of giant jellyfish in a generating plant in Sual, Pangasinan.
- December 12 – A magnitude 6.8 earthquake hits parts of Luzon, with the epicenter located near Lingayen, Pangasinan; reportedly killing 6 people.
- December 15 – The Metro Rail Transit Line 3 (MRT 3) is opened to the public with operations running along a 16.9-kilometer route from North Avenue in Quezon City to Taft Avenue in Pasay City.
- December 18:
  - Malolos becomes a component city in the province of Bulacan through ratification of Republic Act 8754.
  - Tuguegarao becomes a component city in the province of Cagayan through ratification of Republic Act 8755.

== Holidays ==
As per Executive Order No. 292, chapter 7 section 26, the following are regular holidays and special days, approved on July 25, 1987. Note that in the list, holidays in bold are "regular holidays" and those in italics are "nationwide special days".

- January 1 – New Year's Day
- April 1 – Maundy Thursday
- April 2 – Good Friday
- April 9 – Araw ng Kagitingan (Day of Valor)
- May 1 – Labor Day
- June 12 – Independence Day
- August 29 – National Heroes Day
- November 1 – All Saints Day
- November 30 – Bonifacio Day
- December 25 – Christmas Day
- December 30 – Rizal Day
- December 31 – Last Day of The Year

In addition, several other places observe local holidays, such as the foundation of their town. These are also "special days."

== Sports ==
- January 21 – Dr J Ana Water Dispenser captured the 1999 2nd Yakult PBL Centennial Cup crown, becoming the 1st title to win the tournament, defeating Tanduay Gold Rhum Masters, three games to two.
- June 6 – Formula Shell Zoom Masters captured the 1999 PBA All-Filipino Cup crown, becoming the 10th team to win the league's most prestigious tournament, defeating Tanduay Rhum Masters, four games to two, for their fourth championship and repeated as back-to-back champions.
- July 1 – The Welcoat House Paints were crowned the 1999 Yakult-PBL Challenge Cup champions after clinching an 80–74 victory over the Red Bull energy Drink in a Game 4 for the title at the Makati Coliseum
- August 7–15 – The Philippines participated at the 20th Southeast Asian Games were held in Bandar Seri Begawan, Brunei Darussalam. It ranked fifth place, with an overall medal tally of 87.
- September 15 – The San Miguel Beermen won their 12th Straight PBA title defeated the Formula Shell Zoom Masters The Beermen wins two straight title-winning runs and won their first championship in five years.
- October 7 - The DLSU Green Archers defeated the UST Growling Tigers for the championship of the 62nd season of UAAP.
- October 31–November 6 – Cebu City hosted the 1999 IPSC Handgun World Shoot XII.
- November 7–21 – The Iloilo and Bacolod Hosting the 1999 AFC Women's Championship was held from 7 to 21 November 1999 in the Philippines.
- December 8 – The Manila Metrostars rout the Cebu Gems, 101–83 in Game Six, before a hometown crowd at the Mail & More Sports Complex in San Andres and crowned themselves the 1999 MBA national champions.
- December 12 – The San Miguel Beermen captured their second straight title of the season with a 4–2 series victory over Alaska Milkmen. The Beermen won their 13th PBA crown and are now the winningest ballclub, tied with the famed Crispa Redmanizers for most titles.

== Births ==
- January 8 – Kelvin Miranda, actor
- January 12 – Niel Murillo, member of BoybandPH
- January 25 – Ysabel Ortega, actress
- February 16 – Sofia Wunsch, football player
- March 20 – Eya Laure, volleyball player
- April 1 – Jairus Aquino, actor
- April 3 – Emman Nimedez, vlogger and online sensation (d. 2020)
- April 5 – Sharlene San Pedro, actress
- April 20 – Celine Domingo, volleyball player
- April 21 – Loisa Andalio, actress and dancer
- May 1 – Kisses Delavin, actress and beauty queen
- May 14 – Francis Magundayao, Filipino actor
- August 23 – Herlene Budol, actress
- September 18 – Jeremy Glinoga, actor and singer
- October 5 – Pauline Mendoza, actress and model
- October 8 – Sophia Senoron, actress and beauty queen
- October 13 – Yong Muhajil, actor
- October 14 – Chelsea Manalo, beauty queen
- October 23 – Joseph Andre Garcia, actor
- October 30 – Jessika Cowart, football player
- November 8 – Jennifer Nierva, volleyball player
- November 25 – Heaven Peralejo, actress
- November 27 – Maki, singer-songwriter
- December 5 – Julia Buencamino, actress (d. 2015)
- December 16 – Anicka Castañeda, football player
- December 20 – Migo Adecer, actor and singer

== Deaths ==
- February 5 – Leo Echegaray, rape convict. (b. 1960)
- May 16 – Eva Macapagal, Ninth First Lady of the Philippines (b. 1915)
- May 20 – Carlos Quirino, Filipino biographer and historian (b. 1910)
- June 28 – Eugenio Lopez, Jr., businessman, head of the Lopez Group of Companies. (b. 1928)
- July 11 – Marcelo Fernan, Lawyer (b. 1927)
- July 25 – Raul Manglapus, Filipino Senator (b. 1918)
- September 15 – Renato Constantino, Filipino historian (b. 1919)
- November 28 – N.V.M. Gonzalez, Filipino writer (b. 1915)
- December 24 – Antonio V. Raquiza, Filipino politician and lawyer (b. 1908)
- December 31 – Conrado Balweg, former priest and known communist leader in the Cordillera. (b. 1942)
