= 1995 in the Philippines =

- Decades: 1970s; 1980s; 1990s; 2000s; 2010s
- See also: List of years in the Philippines; films

1995 in the Philippines details events of note that happened in the Philippines in the year 1995.

== Incumbents ==
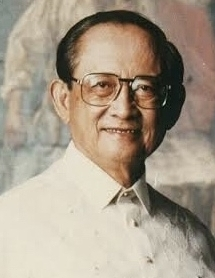
Fidel V.
Ramos

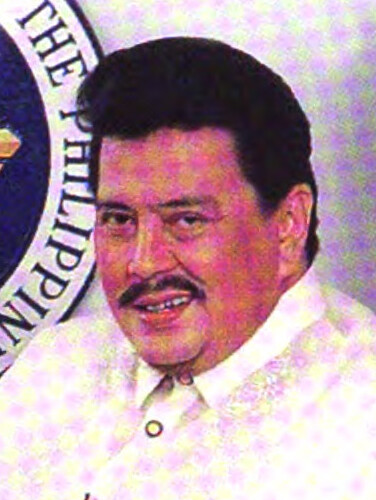
Joseph E.
Estrada

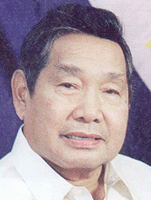
Neptali A.
Gonzales Sr.

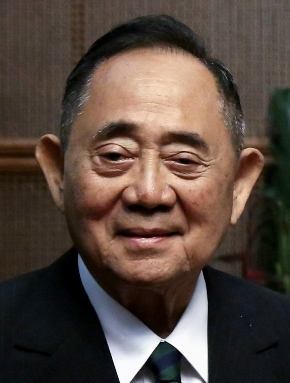
Jose C.
de Venecia Jr.

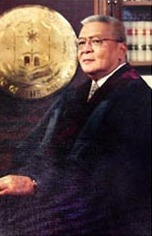
Andres D.
Narvasa

- President: Fidel Ramos (Lakas)
- Vice President: Joseph Estrada (NPC)
- Senate President:
  - Edgardo Angara (until August 28)
  - Neptali Gonzales (starting August 29)
- House Speaker: Jose de Venecia, Jr.
- Chief Justice: Andres Narvasa
- Philippine Congress:
  - 9th Congress of the Philippines (until June 9)
  - 10th Congress of the Philippines (starting July 24)

== Events ==
=== January ===
- January 3 – An overloaded passenger bus crashes into a ravine in Echague, Isabela, killing at least 31 and injuring 36.
- January 6 – The police discovers what will be called Bojinka plot following a minor fire in an apartment building in Malate, Manila. The failed plot by Islamic militants, later reportedly linked to Al-Qaeda, has planned to assassinate Pope John Paul II in the country and to bomb U.S. airplanes later that month.

Abdul Hakim Murad is arrested while Ramzi Yousef escapes. Murad would be extradited later to the United States.

- January 10–15 – World Youth Day 1995.
- January 12–16 – Second pastoral and state visit of Pope John Paul II in the country, coinciding with the 10th World Youth Day (WYD) and marking the fourth centenary of the Archdiocese of Manila and the Dioceses of Cebu, Caceres and Nueva Segovia. On Jan 15, the Mass he led in Luneta, marking the end of WYD, draws a crowd of an estimated 4-million, the largest gathering at such papal Mass at that time.
- January 13 – A clash between the Philippine Army and some 120 Abu Sayyaf Group (ASG) members in Basilan results in the deaths of 42 extremists and 7 from the government troops; uncovers the terrorist group's existence for the first time since its establishment. Cirilito Sobejana, who led the team, would be awarded the Medal of Valor by the Armed Forces of the Philippines in 1996.
- January 21 – Pasig becomes a highly urbanized city in Metro Manila through ratification of Republic Act 7829.

=== February ===
- Early February – The Philippine Navy discovers ships and structures being built, all by the Chinese, in Mischief Reef (Panganiban Reef) in the Spratly Archipelago (Kalayaan Island Group), South China Sea off Palawan; such occupation since the previous year causes the Government to take legal diplomatic actions against China and further tensions between two countries, especially in May when two Chinese ships will block that of the Department of National Defense attempting to approach the area.
- February 4 – Makati becomes a highly urbanized city through ratification of Republic Act 7854.

=== March ===
- March 8 – Former Antique assemblyman Arturo Pacificador, who have been implicated in the 1984 Sibalom massacre and the 1986 assassination of former provincial governor Evelio Javier, surrenders to the authorities.
- March 9 – The daughter of Alex Bartolome reports him to the police for raping her during the previous year and a half, leading to his conviction and execution in January 2000. He was the last prisoner to be executed by the Philippines.
- March 14 – In a highly publicized trial, the Pasig City Regional Trial Court (RTC), in its decision dated Mar 11, convicts former Calauan, Laguna mayor Antonio Sanchez and six of his men for the deaths of two University of the Philippines Los Baños students in 1993, sentencing them to reclusión perpetua.
- March 17 – Flor Contemplacion, a household worker convicted of murder by the High Court of Singapore in 1994, is executed by hanging, causing diplomatic tensions between the Philippines and Singapore.

=== April ===
- April 2 - SM Southmall opens as the fifth SM mall in the Philippines and the first SM mall in Las Piñas and southern Metro Manila.
- April 4 – Some 200 heavily armed men, ASG members and Moro National Liberation Front renegades, raid Ipil town, then part of Zamboanga del Sur; set afire and rob the town center; kill 53 people, with five reportedly from the government. The bandits later take about 52 civilians hostage as they retreat; by mid-April, they would reportedly kill 20 of them in the municipalities of Siocon, R.T. Lim, and Tungawan; 32 would escape.
- April 7 – Following the Ipil raid, battles between combined government forces and ASG gunmen in Siocon and Roseller T. Lim reportedly kill 12 extremists in both encounters, as well as three militiamen and 5 civilian hostages in Siocon.
- April 30 – President Ramos inaugurates the opening of the 722-million-peso Subic International Airport (formerly a United States military base). This indicates growth after the removal of military bases in the country.

=== May ===
- May 8:
  - National legislative and local elections are held. Winning the most seats in the House of Representatives is the administration party Lakas–NUCD–UMDP, in the Senate is their national coalition with the oppositionist LDP.
  - Majority of voters in Kalinga-Apayao ratified in a plebiscite RA 7878, signed on Feb 14, converting the sub-provinces into new provinces of Kalinga (its capital will be Tabuk) and Apayao (new capital will be Kabugao).
  - Muntinlupa becomes a highly urbanized city in Metro Manila through ratification of Republic Act 7926.
- May 16 – Overloaded inter-island ferry M/V Viva Antipolo VII catches fire and sinks in Tayabas Bay while approaching the port of Lucena; as of May 20, seventy passengers are killed, 52 others are reported missing.
- May 18 – Eleven Kuratong Baleleng crime syndicate members are killed in Quezon City in a reported summary execution by the police. Two more members are also found dead separately in Pasig City and Laguna. On Nov 2, multiple murder charges will be filed by Ombudsman Aniano Desierto before the Sandiganbayan against then P/Chief Supt. Panfilo Lacson and 26 other Philippine National Police officers implicated in the Quezon City incident; however, in 2003, the city court would dismiss the case, to be further affirmed twice by the Supreme Court.

=== June ===
- June 7 – Intercountry Adoption Act (RA 8043) is enacted, allowing Filipino children to be adopted by foreigners if cannot be adopted by qualified Filipinos; strengthening protection against the sale and trafficking abroad.
- June 20 – Majority of voters reject in a plebiscite RA 7891, which has signed on Feb 20, seeking division of the province of Isabela into proposed Isabela del Norte and Isabela del Sur.
- June 27 – Supreme Court orders permanent cease of operations of jai alai frontons in the country. It has decided with finality that the sport is illegal following opposition from the government.

=== July ===
- July 17 – The Philippines signs The Hague Convention on Protection of Children and Co-operation in Respect of Intercountry Adoption, which would be ratified and enforced the following year.
- July 28 – The Makati City RTC convicts former P/Col. (P/SSupt.) Reynaldo Berroya and two others for the 1993 abduction of a Taiwanese businessman, and sentences them to life imprisonment. The ruling would be overturned by the Supreme Court in 1997.

=== August ===
- August 3 – The National Bureau of Investigation (NBI) arrests a Reform the Armed Forces Movement (RAM) member, former Sgt. Filomeno Maligaya, a co-conspirator in the 1986 killing of trade union leader Rolando Olalia and his driver. The RAM will be later cleared by the NBI shortly after the case is reopened. By late 2021, Maligaya is among the nine of 13 RAM members, charged in 1998 with the double murders, still at large.
- August 10 – Department of Justice files charges of rape and murder against eight sons of prominent families, including Hubert Webb, identified by star witness Jessica Alfaro, along with a former policeman, all accused in the deaths of three Vizconde family members in 1991. The case has reopened upon appearance and confession of Alfaro; trial will begin later in the Parañaque RTC.
- August 25 – Movie star Robin Padilla surrenders to police in Camarines Norte after four weeks in hiding as the Court of Appeals has upheld in July the 1994 conviction by a RTC for illegal possession of firearms, ordering him to begin serving the prison sentence. He would be released after being given conditional pardon by then Pres. Ramos; would be given absolute pardon by Pres. Duterte in 2016.
- Late August – Seventeen Senators vote to declare the Senate Presidency vacant, removing Sen. Edgardo Angara; Sen. Neptali Gonzales is elected later as replacement.

=== September ===
- September 6 – Apparent explosions trigger collapse of crater wall of Mt. Parker in T'boli, South Cotabato, overflowing Lake Maughan atop, causing what would be the worst floods in central Mindanao area affecting mostly tribal communities; by Sep 12, reported deaths are at least 70 while 125 are missing, with damages worth ₱346-million.
- September 16 – An Emirates Islamic court sentences to death Sarah Balabagan, a household worker who has convicted of murder by another court in June 26 for killing her employer in self-defense in 1994, reversing the earlier imposed prison sentence. Following protests, in the third trial in October, an appeal court will reduce the punishment. She would return in the country in 1996.
- September 30 – Tropical Storm Sybil (Mameng) causes destruction in 32 provinces within eight regions, especially in Central Luzon wherein lahar flows and floods occur in some parts of Pampanga; also affects Metro Manila and those in Southern Tagalog, most of the Visayas, and the provinces of Pangasinan, Albay and Bukidnon. It results in ₱3.17-billion worth of damages and 116 deaths.
- September – Nationwide inflation rate increases to 11.8%, the highest in 45 months, which has caused by rice and sugar crises.

=== October ===
- October 1 – In what will be the Mt. Pinatubo's worst lahar calamity since its eruption, rainfall during Tropical Storm Mameng causes lahars washing down from the volcano's slopes to the Pasig-Potrero River and its tributaries including the Gugu Creek, quickly burying the entire barangay Cabalantian in Bacolor, Pampanga. As of October 7, 100 are reported dead and 252 missing, although fatalities are claimed to be probably more than a thousand. Thousands of houses in the area and 4 other barangays are buried into deposits about 9 meters deep; lahar flows also bury parts of San Fernando.
- October 13 – The Government signs a peace agreement with rebels of the Reform the Armed Forces Movement (RAM-SFP-YOU) at Camp Aguinaldo, formally ending the latter's seven-year revolt that occurred mostly in the time of the previous administration.
- October 19 – Opening of Enchanted Kingdom theme park.
- October 24
  - The last total solar eclipse of the century is witnessed mostly in Tawi-Tawi, lasting for more than two minutes.
  - Series of tropical disturbances begin with tropical depression Oniang, Oct 24, passing over Luzon and causing floods in Bulacan and renewed lahar flows in Central Luzon. Tropical Storm Zack (Pepang), from Oct 28 to 29, batters Visayas and Palawan, triggering massive floods; results in 265 deaths and ₱424-million worth of damages.

=== November ===
- November 2–3 – The most destructive of the series of tropical cyclones, Super Typhoon Angela (Rosing) rampages across southern Luzon with strong winds; devastates half of the country's regions including Bicol Region, the hardest hit, as well as the mainland part of the Southern Tagalog Region, Metro Manila, and Bataan. Final data reports 936 deaths and ₱10.829-billion worth of damages.
- November 14 – The Court of Appeals reverses the 1992 libel conviction by the Manila RTC and acquits The Philippine Star publisher Maximo Soliven and the late journalist Luis Beltran, charged in connection with the latter's comments about Pres. Cojuangco–Aquino after a 1987 coup attempt.
- November 16 – Supreme Court denies with finality the motion for reconsideration filed by Kilosbayan, Inc. questioning an agreement between Philippine Charity Sweepstakes Office and Philippine Gaming Management Corporation on the on-line lottery operations, thus legalizing lotto.
- November 27 – The construction of the US$1.15-billion Skyway project is initiated, the biggest infrastructure project in the country, intended to ease the flow of traffic in Metro Manila.

=== December ===
- December 11 – Communist hit squad Alex Boncayao Brigade (ABB) perpetrates three separate ambushes targeting prominent Chinese-Filipino businessmen, killing four people including industrialist Leonardo Ty and his driver in Quezon City, as well as a Singaporean child. In 2004, two suspected ABB members masterminding the murder of Ty would be convicted by a city RTC.
- December 13 – A fire at inter-island passenger ferry M/V Kimelody Cristy near Fortune Island off Batangas leaves 24 people dead, 13 more are missing.
- December 16–17 – Seven suspected Pakistani terrorists are arrested in Bulacan and Manila; are later charged with plotting to disrupt the 1996 APEC Summit. Two others would surrender later at the Philippine National Police headquarters in Quezon City.
- December 29–30 – Fifteen individuals said to be part of Pakistan-based radical group Mahajar Qumi Movement are arrested in separate police raids in their safehouses in Manila. By year-end, 29 suspected foreign terrorists have been arrested in the country.

== Holidays ==
As per Executive Order No. 292, chapter 7 section 26, the following are regular holidays and special days, approved on July 25, 1987. Note that in the list, holidays in bold are "regular holidays" and those in italics are "nationwide special days".

- January 1 – **New Year's Day**
- April 9 – **Araw ng Kagitingan** (Day of Valor)
- April 13 – **Maundy Thursday**
- April 14 – **Good Friday**
- May 1 – **Labor Day**
- June 12 – **Independence Day**
- August 27 – **National Heroes Day**
- November 1 – All Saints Day
- November 30 – **Bonifacio Day**
- December 25 – **Christmas Day**
- December 30 – **Rizal Day**
- December 31 – Last Day of the Year

In addition, several other places observe local holidays, such as the foundation of their town. These are also "special days."

== Sports ==
- November 17–21 – 1995 World Taekwondo Championships is held in Manila, Philippines
- December 9–21 – The Philippines participates in the 1995 Southeast Asian Games

== Concerts ==
- February 26 – Pearl Jam Vitalogy Tour: Folk Arts Theater, Pasay
- March 3 – Janet Jackson Janet World Tour: Folk Arts Theater, Pasay
- June 2–3 – La Toya Jackson live at the Music Museum, San Juan, Metro Manila

== Births ==
- January 4 – Ara Galang, volleyball player
- January 5:
  - Joyce Ching, actress
  - Lexi Fernandez, actress
- January 21 – Hali Long, football player
- January 26 – Coleen Perez, actress
- January 27 – Kat Tolentino, volleyball player
- February 3 – Kim Domingo, actress, TV commercial and model
- February 20 – McCoy de Leon, actor and member of Hashtags
- February 23:
  - Dave Bornea, actor
  - Beatrice Gomez, beauty queen
- March 3 – Maine Mendoza, YouTube sensation, actress, comedian, and host
- March 16 – Shy Carlos, actress
- March 19:
  - Julia Montes, actress
  - Fumiya Sankai, actor and reality show contestant
- March 27 – Koreen Medina, actress and beauty queen
- April 24:
  - Amani Aguinaldo, football player
  - Michelle Dee, actress and beauty queen
- April 25 – Arra San Agustin, actress
- April 26 – Daniel Padilla, actor and singer
- May 3 – Shaira Diaz, actress
- May 10 – Jia Morado, volleyball player
- May 11 – Yassi Pressman, actress and dancer
- May 19 – Abel Estanislao, actor and model
- May 21 – Diego Loyzaga, actor
- May 23 – Eula Caballero, actress
- June 4 - Jerome Ponce, actor
- June 15 – David Licauco, actor
- June 24 – Mark Stephen Loman, mixed martial artist and former MMA World Champion
- June 28 – Krizza Neri, singer
- July 18 – Phytos Ramirez, actor, TV commercial and model
- July 23 – James Wright, singer and recording artist
- July 26 – Kim Kianna Dy, volleyball player
- July 29:
  - Jin Macapagal, actor, model, and dancer
  - Kiray, actress
- August 1 – Derrick Monasterio, actor, dancer and singer
- August 7 – Tony Labrusca, actor
- August 18 – Jon Lucas, actor
- August 21 – Gil Cuerva, actor
- August 23 – Eliza Pineda, actress
- August 29 – Aria Clemente, actress and singer
- August 30 – Addy Raj, actor, singer, and model
- September 6 – John Manalo, actor
- September 15 – Rita Daniela, actress and singer
- September 24 – Gigi De Lana, actress and singer
- September 25 – Kristina Knott, track and field athlete
- September 28 – Danny Kingad, mixed martial artist
- October 27 – Maika Rivera, actress and tennis player
- October 29 – Eumir Marcial, boxer
- November 1 – Andre Paras, actor and basketball player
- November 17 – EJ Obiena, pole vaulter
- November 26 – Michael Pangilinan, singer-songwriter
- November 27 – Yohan Hwang, singer
- December 10 – Majoy Baron, volleyball player
- December 26 – Gazini Ganados, beauty queen

== Deaths ==
- February 28 – Tito Espinosa, Masbate Representative
- March 8 – Ike Lozada, comedian, actor, and TV host (b. 1940)
- March 17 – Flor Contemplacion, household worker (b. 1953)
- April 22 – Honorato Perez, mayor of Cabanatuan
- April 28 – Wilfrido Ma. Guerrero, playwright, director, teacher and theater artist (b. 1911)
- May 11 – José T. Joya, Filipino abstract artist (b. 1931)
- June 11 – Rodel Naval, singer, songwriter and actor (b. 1953)
- June 24 – Eduardo Masferré, photographer (b. 1909)
- August 4 – Alejandro Almendras, senator (b. 1919)
- September 5 – Andy Poe, actor (b. 1943)
- September 30 – Nestor Redondo, comic book artist (b. 1928)
- December 9 – Eugene Barutag, Filipino boxer (b. 1976)
- December 11 – Leonardo Ty, Filipino-Chinese industrialist (b. 1913)
- December 16 – Bert Marcelo, actor and comedian (b. 1936)
- December 18 – Panchito Alba, actor and comedian (b. 1925)

=== Unknown ===
- Carlos Magdaluyo, businessman (b. 1921)
