= 1994 in the Philippines =

- Decades: 1970s; 1980s; 1990s; 2000s; 2010s
- See also: List of years in the Philippines; films

The following events happened in the Philippines in the year 1994.

== Incumbents ==
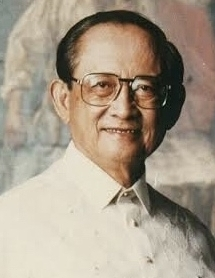
Fidel V.
Ramos

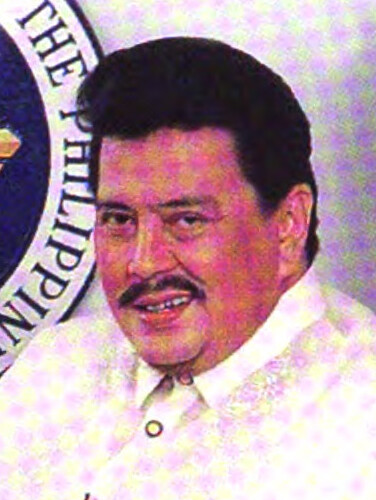
Joseph E.
Estrada

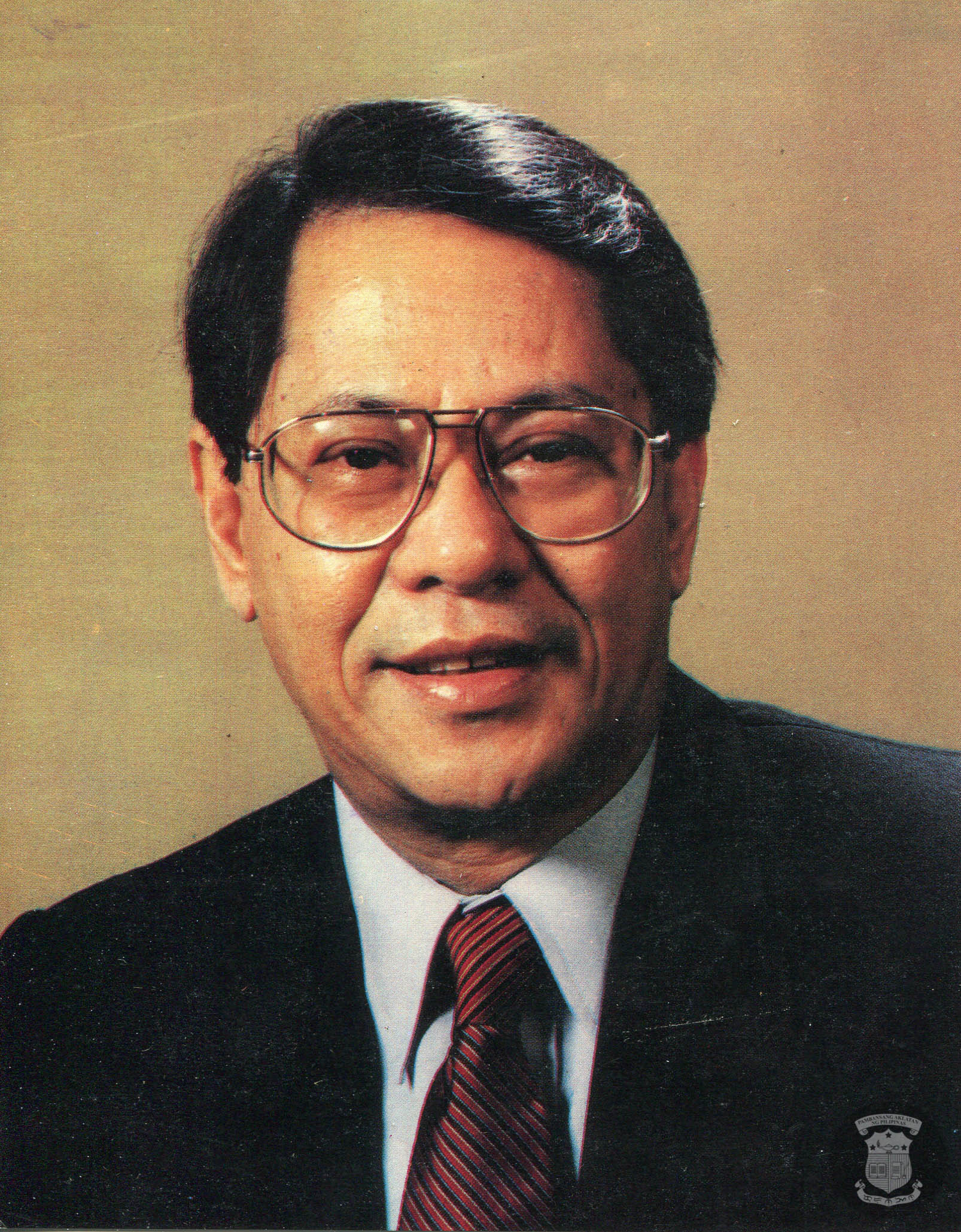
Edgardo J.
Angara

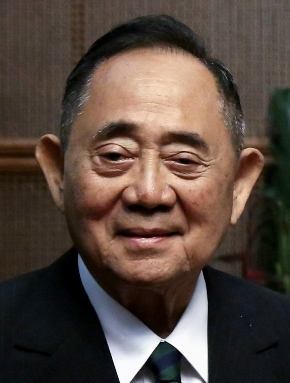
Jose C.
de Venecia Jr.

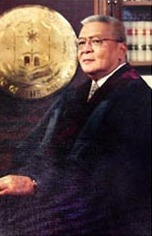
Andres D.
Narvasa

- President: Fidel Ramos (Lakas)
- Vice President: Joseph Estrada (NPC)
- Senate President: Edgardo Angara
- House Speaker: Jose de Venecia, Jr.
- Chief Justice: Andres Narvasa
- Philippine Congress: 9th Congress of the Philippines

== Events ==
=== February ===
- February 19 – Separate grenade attacks in Isulan, Sultan Kudarat and Davao City kill 11 people and injure 22.

=== March ===
- March 29 – The Philippines gets connected to the Internet. The Philippine Network Foundation (PHNet) connected the country to Sprint in the United States via a 64 kbit/s link.

=== April ===
- April 8 – The Pasig Regional Trial Court (RTC) acquits eight individuals charged in 1992 of kidnapping three Taiwanese children; among them police chief inspectors, dismissed Maj. Timoteo Zarcal and Maj. Jose Pring. The said police officers would be assassinated in separate incidents by the Alex Boncayao Brigade (ABB), a unit of the New People's Army, later that year.
- April 10:
  - The massacre of Helen, Chelsea Liz and Anne Geleen Arandia in Lipa City, Batangas.
  - Mandaluyong becomes a highly urbanized city through ratification of Republic Act 7675.
- April 19 – Fernando Galera, a fish vendor accused of robbery with rape in January, is convicted by the Quezon City RTC and sentenced to death for the first time since the restoration of the capital punishment in the country on January 1. Soon before his supposed execution in 1997, Galera would be acquitted and ordered released by the Supreme Court after the judgement is reversed, following appeals for re-trial of the case.
- April 25 – Actor Robin Padilla is convicted for illegal possession of firearms; he would begin to serve the prison sentence in 1995. He would be released after being given conditional pardon by then Pres. Ramos; would be given absolute pardon by Pres. Duterte in 2016.
- April 26 – The Supreme Court votes, 7–6, to void a contract between the Philippine Charity Sweepstakes Office and a Malaysian firm to conduct an online lotto in the country, stating that it violates the law.

=== May ===
- May – A scam, involving undelivered treasury bills, perpetrated by some people in Bancapital Development Corp., is discovered by the authorities. It costs close to a billion peso potential losses in the banking system.
- May 21 – Miss Universe 1994, the 43rd Miss Universe pageant, was held in Manila. Outgoing Miss Universe Dayanara Torres of Puerto Rico crowned the pageant winner, Sushmita Sen of India.
- May 26 – Filemon Lagman, leader of Communist Party of the Philippines' (CPP) urban hit squad ABB, is arrested by the military in Quezon City.

=== June ===
- June 5 – A conference on Indonesia's annexation of East Timor is held.
- June 8 – Abu Sayyaf Group extremists seize about 52 civilians on a highway in Isabela, Basilan, including 50 passengers of a convoy on the way to Lantawan, as well as Lamitan Roman Catholic priest Rev. Cirilo Nacorda; release all hostages but 36 Christians; 15 of them are shot dead and one escape. On June 13, twenty of those held will be freed after ransom money has paid to the captors, as Nacorda only remains in captivity.
- June 10 – Bomb attacks in Zamboanga City, perpetrated by the Abu Sayyaf Group, kill 71 people.

=== July ===
- July – Former members of the MNLF's Bangsa Moro Army kidnap city sports official So Kim Cheng in Davao City; despite closed negotiations, captors did not release the victim and later killed him instead after they learned of a group of operatives conducting own rescue attempt.
- July 6
  - The municipality of Santiago in the province of Isabela becomes an independent component city through ratification of Republic Act No. 7720.
  - Nancy Siscar, a 22-year-old elementary school teacher was raped and killed by brothers Jurry Andal, Ricardo Andal and Edwin Mendoza in Barangay Banoyo, San Luis, Batangas.

=== August ===
- August 8 – Fr. Nacorda, having been turned over by ASG to the Moro National Liberation Front (MNLF) on July 26 as part of efforts for his freedom, is released unharmed, ending a hostage situation that has lasted for about two months.
- August – The Supreme Court declares the controversial VAT (value-added tax) Law legal, and rules as well that the enacted law does not interfering human rights. In response, the Energy Regulatory Board (ERB) later orders a rollback of gasoline prices by ₱1, and also orders the National Power Corporation to lower fuel price cost adjustment charges covering a 17-day period in the first quarter of the year.
- August 14 – A huge demonstration against birth control is held by hundreds of thousands of Filipinos led by Cardinal Sin, in Luneta Park, Manila.
- August 27 – Moro Islamic Liberation Front (MILF) rebels hold 8 South Koreans and 30 Filipinos, all working at the construction site of a government's irrigation project in Mindanao, claiming that it intrudes on their territory; hostages are released, Sep 4, following negotiations.
- August 29 – A coal mine explosion in Malangas, then part of Zamboanga del Sur, kills 119 people in what would be the country's deadliest mine disaster.

=== September ===
- September 1 – 5 – The government and the Moro National Liberation Front sign a ceasefire agreement, aiming to end guerrilla war.
- September 4 – Unidentified men abduct traders Sixto Escudero, Sr. in M'lang, Cotabato and Jorge Lim and his two children in General Santos; victims were rescued later by the authorities.
- September 15 – The Manila RTC, through a temporary restraining order, stops an order from Malacañang disallowing jai alai.
- September 23 – A mudslide in Mount Pinatubo, triggered by heavy rains a day prior, reportedly kills 20, with 3 missing. Debris flowed include lahars that were released by an eruption in 1991.

=== October ===
- October – Rebel group MILF attack towns in Cotabato, wherein they burn a church and 10 houses in Aleosan, and take hostage 26 civilians in Kabacan, which are freed later on. Within this month, series of terror attacks in the province result in the death of 50 people from both the rebel and government side and displace thousands from four municipalities; are prevented upon ceasefire by end of the month.

=== November ===
- November – Graft charges are filed against dismissed Bureau of Immigration and Deportation chief Zafiro Respicio and 2 others regarding anomalous deportation of 11 Indians facing drug charges in court.
- November 14 – Eugene Tan, former president of the Integrated Bar of the Philippines, and his driver are abducted by six armed men in Muntinlupa and killed in Silang, Cavite; their bodies will be found four days later in neighboring Dasmariñas. In 2011, the Cavite RTC would only convict the gunman, sentencing to reclusión perpetua, and acquit all other involved.
- November 15 – An earthquake (Magnitude: 7.1 M_{w}) followed by huge waves ravages Mindoro, killing at least 65 people and injuring more than 130 others.

=== December ===
- December 2 – Inter-island ship MV Cebu City and Singapore-registered freighter Kota Suria collide in Manila Bay, between Corregidor Island and Maragondon, Cavite, killing more than a hundred, with scores feared drowned.
- December 8 – Dennis Venturina, a member of UP Sigma Rho fraternity was murdered by five members of the Scintilla Juris Fraternity inside the UP premises.
- December 11 – A bomb, allegedly planted by Ramzi Yousef, explodes aboard Philippine Airlines Flight 434 bound for Tokyo, killing a Japanese businessman. The bombing, with another one at a movie theater in Manila on Dec. 1, is part of a test run for Project Bojinka.
- December 14 – Senate votes, 18–5, to ratify the Uruguay Round on the General Agreement on Tariffs and Trade (UR-GATT), a trade treaty on liberalized worldwide trading system, to be imposed in the country on the first day of 1995.

== Holidays ==
As per Executive Order No. 292, chapter 7 section 26, the following are regular holidays and special days, approved on July 25, 1987. Note that in the list, holidays in bold are "regular holidays" and those in italics are "nationwide special days".

- January 1 – **New Year's Day**
- March 31 – **Maundy Thursday**
- April 1 – **Good Friday**
- April 9 – **Araw ng Kagitingan** (Day of Valor)
- May 1 – **Labor Day**
- June 12 – **Independence Day**
- August 28 – **National Heroes Day**
- November 1 – All Saints Day
- November 30 – **Bonifacio Day**
- December 25 – **Christmas Day**
- December 30 – **Rizal Day**
- December 31 – Last Day of the Year

In addition, several other places observe local holidays, such as the foundation of their town. These are also "special days."

== Sports ==
- October 2 – 16 – The **Philippines** participates in the 1994 Asian Games held in Hiroshima, Japan from October 2 to 16, 1994. It Ranks 14th with three gold medals, two silver medals and eight bronze medals with a total of 13 over-all medals.

== Entertainment and culture ==
- June 22 – The annual Manila Film Festival awards ceremony at the Manila Midtown (Ramada) Hotel is marred by allegations of rigging of results for the best actor and actress. The so-called "Filmfest Seven", including the false winners, will later be charged with fraud, with Lolit Solis only sentenced to be placed under court supervision.

== Television ==
=== Premieres ===
- Kousoku Sentai Turboranger on IBC-13 – June 25; Saturday 6:00 pm
- Chikyuu Sentai Fiveman on IBC-13 – June 25; Saturday 6:30 pm
- Sailor Moon on ABC-5 (now on TV5) – July 2; Saturday 6:00 pm
- Yaiba on ABC-5 (now on TV5) – July 3; Sunday 6:30 pm
- Captain Power and the Soldiers of the Future – July 3; Sunday 6:00 pm
- UAAP – UAAP Season 57 on New Vision 9 (later RPN-9 and now RPTV) – July 9
- NCAA – NCAA Season 70 on PTV-4 – June 25

== Births ==
- January 3 – Akiko Solon, singer and actress
- January 6 – Catriona Gray, model and Miss Universe 2018
- January 7 – Jessica Marasigan, member of Girltrends and Miss Philippines Water 2017
- January 11 – Ritz Azul, actress
- January 15 – Vince Gamad, actor
- February 1 – Anthony Rosaldo, actor and singer
- February 8 – Inna Palacios, football player
- February 9 – Jo Berry, actress
- March 7 – Sandro Marcos, politician
- March 21 – Jeron Teng, basketball player
- April 5 – Mylene Paat, volleyball player
- April 6 – Jasmine Curtis-Smith, actress
- April 10 – Ingrid dela Paz, actress and model
- April 23 – Miko Manguba, actor and member of Top One Project (T.O.P.)
- April 27 – Elmo Magalona, actor and singer
- May 17 – Julie Anne San Jose, singer, actress and host
- May 27 – Nicole Kim Donesa, actress
- June 21 – Mika Aereen Reyes, volleyball player
- July 9 – Donnalyn Bartolome, actress and singer
- July 12 – Junnie Boy, vlogger
- July 24 – Franki Russell, actress
- July 30 – Isabella de Leon, actress and singer
- August 14 – Kim Rodriguez, actress
- August 16 – Tippy Dos Santos, actress and singer
- September 9 – Ganiel Krishnan, beauty queen and courtside reporter
- September 20 – Daisuke Sato, football player
- September 22 – Avery Paraiso, actor
- September 23 – Frances Molina, volleyball player
- October 13 – Ian Lariba, table tennis player (d. 2018)
- November 2 – Denise Barbacena, singer and actress
- November 7 – Hiro Peralta, actor
- November 17 – Emmanuelle Vera, actress and singer
- November 20 – Kristofer Martin, actor
- November 23 – Monica Cuenco, actress and singer
- November 26:
  - Noven Belleza, singer
  - Yves Flores, actor
- December 5 – Katrina Velarde, singer
- December 7 – Myrtle Sarrosa, actress and cosplayer
- December 14 – Joshua Dionisio, actor
- December 17 – Darwin Ramos, street child and Servant of God (d. 2012)
- December 27 – Camille Rodriguez, football player
- December 29 – Kristel Fulgar, actress

== Deaths ==
- January 28 – Betty Go Belmonte, Filipina journalist and newspaper publisher (b. 1933)
- March 25 – Jesus M. Vargas, Secretary of National Defense (b. 1905)
- April 7 – Cesar Legaspi, art director, National Artist of the Philippines (b. 1917)
- May 17 – Leonila Garcia, 8th First Lady of the Philippines (b. 1906)
- September 6 – Luis Beltran, journalist (b. 1936)
- November 14 – Eugene A. Tan, president of the Integrated Bar of the Philippines (b. 1945)
- November 15 – Leandro Locsin, architect, National Artist of the Philippines (b. 1928)
