= Dimaporo =

Dimaporo is a surname. It refers to a political family in The Philippines.

== People with the surname ==
- Abdullah D. Dimaporo, Filipino politician
- Aminah Dimaporo (born 1986), Filipina politician
- Mohamad Khalid Dimaporo (born 1980), Filipino economist and politician
- Imelda Dimaporo (born 1959), Filipina politician
- Mohammad Ali Dimaporo (1918 –2004), Filipino politician

== See also ==
- Sultan Naga Dimaporo, municipality
