= Ser Geybin =

Filipino vlogger (born 1997)

- Born: Gavin De Rueda Capinpin; June 10, 1997 (age 29); Cabanatuan, Nueva Ecija, Philippines
- Education: Nueva Ecija University of Science and Technology
- Parents: Pedro Capinpin (father); Elizabeth De Rueda (mother)

Instagram information
- Page: ser.geybin
- Followers: 1.8 million

TikTok information
- Page: ser.geybin
- Followers: 11.9 million

YouTube information
- Channel: Ser Geybin
- Years active: 2012–present
- Genres: vlog; travel; comedy; pranks; family
- Subscribers: 8.37 million
- Views: 3.84 billion
- Last updated: Aug 22, 2026

Gavin De Rueda Capinpin (born June 10, 1997), also known as Ser Geybin, is a Filipino vlogger and former teacher. He is known for his pranks, challenges, and glimpses into his daily life on Facebook, TikTok and YouTube.

== Early life ==
Gavin de Rueda Capinpin was born on June 10, 1997, in Cabanatuan, Nueva Ecija, Philippines to his parents, Elizabeth Reyes De Rueda and Pedro Diaz Capinpin (d. 2021). He is the eldest son among his siblings.

== Career ==
Geybin began uploading videos to YouTube in 2012. He started out as a musician in YouTube and rose to fame in the Philippines by uploading comedy skits and pranks to the platform with his brothers: Allen Capinpin, also known as Chief Allen and Kelzy Capinpin, also known as Capt. Kelzy.

According to Capinpin, he was inspired by fellow content creator Cong TV, who motivated him to start creating vlogs and comedy skits.

== Personal life ==
Geybin grew up in Nueva Ecija, where he and his brothers also produce most of their vlogs. For two decades, he and his family resided in a rental home. According to his mother, they occasionally struggled to pay the rent. In December 2023, they surprised their mother with three newly built houses in Cabanatuan as a birthday and Christmas gift.

He was in a relationship with content creator and former teacher Elma Abesamis Asagra.

On a recent series of posts, the couple announced their breakup, leaving many fans with mixed opinions about the news.

On June 2, 2026, Geybin's brothers Allen and Kelzy, his cousin Kalo, and his longtime partner Elma, released a vlog detailing the events that led to Geybin's hospitalization. They said they found Geybin having difficulty breathing, his eyes rolling upward and his body becoming rigid, and they immediately took him to a hospital. The family later said he was still under care and recovering after the incident.
