= Manuel C. Herrera =

- Born: c. 1924; Wawa, Pilar, Bataan, Philippine Islands
- Died: 1998
- Occupation: Lawyer

Hon. Manuel Cruz Herrera (c. 1924–1998) was a lawyer, an instructor in the University of the Philippines and Manuel Luis Quezon University, and a deputy tanod bayan (Ombudsman at present) during the Marcos regime and later, head of the prosecution panel in the Benigno Aquino Jr. murder case that led to the EDSA Revolution of 1986. And then became one of the justices of the Court of Appeals from 1987 to 1997, and chair of the National Unification Commission.

Born in Wawa, Pilar, Bataan, Manuel Herrera was the second of nine children of Jose S. Herrera Sr., third municipal Mayor of Pilar (sheriff at that time) and Brigida Cruz, both natives of Wawa, Pilar, Bataan. He studied law at Manuel L. Quezon University while working as a janitor. Herrera was known for his generosity towards his fellow kababayans, his bravery, kindness, nationalism, and integrity, especially as a justice of the Court of Appeals.

Despite their courageous efforts in presenting new evidences and eyewitnesses, he felt that there was really a conspiracy to assassinate not only former senator Ninoy Aquino but also the fall guy Rolando Galman. On January 10, 1985, he and his prosecution team together by presiding Justice Manuel Pamaram were called by President Marcos to a meeting in Malacañan Palace, insinuating that Galman was really the communist who shot Aquino and defended the accused. Herrera tried to voice out his opinion by telling that Galman was a fall guy and there was an ongoing conspiracy but Pamaran told him not to contradict Marcos because he was sick at that time and the President might collapse. But it only swelled the flood of dissatisfaction of his regime, less than a year the EDSA People Power Revolution occurred and Marcos found himself out in power. In March 1986 he revealed that Marcos did in fact try to influence, if not direct, the outcome of the first Sandiganbayan. Herrera then became one of the Associate justices of the Court of Appeals until his retirement. Herrera died of a heart attack at the age of 74.

A road (Herrera Road, Brgy. Malagasang ll-C, Imus, Cavite) was named after him in honor of his great contributions to the people and love of his fellows kabarangays.
