= Maria dela Cruz =

Filipino footballer (born 1993)

Personal information
- Full name: Maria Charizze Ina Dela Cruz
- Date of birth: 13 November 1993 (age 32)
- Place of birth: Cagayan de Oro, Philippines
- Height: 5 ft 4 in (1.63 m)
- Position: Goalkeeper

Youth career
- ?–2011: Granite Bay Grizzlies

College career
Years	Team	Apps	(Gls)
2011–?	Idaho State Bengals		

International career^{‡}
	Philippines	4	(0)
- ‡ National team caps and goals as of 3 January 2014

Maria Charizze Ina Dela Cruz (born 13 November 1993) is a Filipino footballer who plays as a goalkeeper.

== Early life and education ==
Maria dela Cruz was born on 13 November 1993 in Cagayan de Oro, Philippines to Lew Chaney and Evelyn dela Cruz. Dela Cruz move to the United States at age 4 and spent some of her childhood in Roseville, California. Dela Cruz graduated from Granite Bay High School. She played for her high school's basketball and association football team for three years and four years respectively. She later moved to Idaho to study at Idaho State University.

== International career ==
In 2013, Dela Cruz was called up by the Philippines for the 2014 AFC Women's Asian Cup qualifiers. She made her first international debut against Iran and kept a clean sheet against her team's opponents. The final scoreline for the match was 6–0.
