= Richard Abelardo =

Filipino film director (1902–1993)

Richard Velayo Abelardo (29 September 1902 – 27 August 1993) was a Filipino film director.

== Early life ==
Abelardo was born to Juan Henson Abelardo, a painter, and Cecilia Velayo in San Miguel de Mayumo, Bulacan. At a young age, he boarded a ship destined for California. Upon arriving, he jumped ship and was later hired as a service painter in theaters with the Flag Company. He secured a painting job at Universal Pictures. Proving himself at Universal, he was given work at Warner Brothers and MGM.

== Career ==
He married an embroiderer from Malate, Salud (née Carmona), and had two daughters, Louise and Rita. In 1935, the whole family went back to the Philippines due to the Depression.

Abelardo's most famous films were:

- El Diablo – starring Leopoldo Salcedo and Rebecca Gonzales, script written by him based on the story, Faustus, one of the first Filipino movies that had the main lead die. Many trick shots were displayed here.
- Mutya ng Pasig – based on the music of his cousin, Nicanor Abelardo, it stars Rebecca Gonzales and Roger Nite.

Abelardo was noted for the special effects he employed in his films. In Encantada, he showed his superb camera work by the aging changes in Dizon. In Kambal sa Sinukuan, starring Rogelio de la Rosa, Rogelio played three persons and the film showed them touching one another. In Ibon Adarna, people were transformed into stone.

== Death ==
Richard Abelardo died on 27 August 1993 in Quezon City, aged 90.

== Filmography ==
- 1948 - Malikmata (In the Wink of an Eye)
- 1950 - Mutya ng Pasig (The Muse of Pasig)
- 1950 - Nuno sa Punso
- 1950 - Doble Cara (Two-Faced)
- 1950 - Doctor X
- 1951 - Shalimar
- 1951 - Haring Cobra (King Cobra)
- 1952 - Taong Paniki
- 1953 - 3 Labuyo
- 1954 - Krus na Bakal (Metal Crucifix)
- 1955 - Mariang Sinukuan
- 1955 - Anak ng Berdugo (Son of the Executioner)
- 1956 - Big Shot
- 1956 - Higit sa Korona (More than the Crown)
- 1957 - Conde de Amor (Count of Love)
- 1957 - Si Meyor Naman (Oh Mayor)
- 1958 - Zarex
