= Interrogation (disambiguation) =

Interrogation is interviewing for the purpose of gaining information.

Interrogation may also refer to:

== Film ==
- Visaranai (Interrogation), an Indian docudrama crime-thriller by Vetrimaaran
- Interrogation (2016 film), an American action film
- Interrogation (1982 film), a Polish drama film
- Interrogation (1979 film), a Soviet crime/drama film

== Television ==
=== Episodes ===
- "Interrogation", Alex Rider season 1, episode 2 (2020)
- "Interrogation", Ang Probinsyano season 8, episode 251 (2021)
- "Interrogation", Dick Powell's Zane Grey Theatre season 4, episode 1 (1959)
- "Interrogation", Ngayon at Kailanman (2018) season 1, episode 13 (2018)
- "Interrogation", Lilet Matias: Attorney-at-Law episode 38 (2024)
- "Interrogation", Mind Field season 2, episode 3 (2017)
- "Interrogation", Royal Blood episode 29 (2023)
- "Interrogation", Special Forces: World's Toughest Test season 1, episode 10 (2023)
- "Interrogation", The Good Son episode 8 (2017)
- "Interrogation", The Iron Heart season 1, episode 28 (2022)

=== Shows ===
- Interrogation (TV series), a 2020 American true crime frame television series

== Other uses ==
- Polling (computer science), or polling, in computer science

== See also ==
- The Interrogation (disambiguation)
- The Interrogator (disambiguation)
