= The Interrogation =

The Interrogation may refer to:

== Film ==
- The Interrogation (film) (Finnish: Kuulustelu), a 2009 Finnish war drama by Jörn Donner

== Literature ==
- The Interrogation (French: Le Procès-Verbal), a 1963 novel by J. M. G. Le Clézio
- The Interrogation, a 2002 novel by Thomas H. Cook

== Television ==
- "The Interrogation", 18 Wheels of Justice season 2, episode 22 (2001)
- "The Interrogation", Clarence season 2, episode 1 (2016)
- "The Interrogation", Cold Case Files season 5, episode 13 (2006)
- "The Interrogation", Designated Survivor season 1, episode 6 (2016)
- "The Interrogation", Dragnet (1967 TV series) season 1, episode 4 (1967)
- "The Interrogation", Greenhouse Academy season 2, episode 2 (2019)
- "The Interrogation", Planet of the Apes episode 10 (1974)
- "The Interrogation", Right Now Kapow episode 18b (2017)
- "The Interrogation", The Champions episode 18 (1969)
- "The Interrogation", Tough Love Couples episode 5 (2010)

== See also ==
- Interrogation (disambiguation)
- The Interrogator (disambiguation)
