= The Interrogator =

The Interrogator may refer to:

== Literature ==
- The Interrogators, a 1965 novel by Allan Prior
- The Interrogator, a 2009 novel by Andrew Williams

== Television ==
- The Interrogator (TV play), a 1961 British TV play
- "The Interrogator", Mission: Impossible season 3, episode 25 (1969)
- "The Interrogator", The DuPont Show of the Week season 2, episode 2 (1962)

== Other uses ==
- The Interrogator (wrestler), alias used by wrestler Robert Maillet

== See also ==
- The Interrogation (disambiguation)
- Interrogation (disambiguation)
