= List of The Good Son episodes =

The Good Son (formerly known as Kung Kailangan Mo Ako / lit. ' If You Need Me'), was a Philippine family drama television series starring Jerome Ponce, Joshua Garcia, McCoy de Leon and Nash Aguas. The series premiered on ABS-CBN's Primetime Bida evening block and worldwide on The Filipino Channel on September 25, 2017 to June 13, 2018, replacing A Love to Last.

The mystery, family drama revolves around Victor Buenavidez (Albert Martinez), a good father in the eyes of his sons, Enzo (Jerome Ponce) and Calvin (Nash Aguas). Behind their father's image lies a dark secret: he has another son, Joseph (Joshua Garcia). Joseph and his half brother Obet (McCoy de Leon) grew up fatherless, each from a different father. Victor returns to Joseph's life and things are starting to get better for their family, but Victor dies suddenly. The two families clash with each other to clear their names for the latter's demise. How will Victor's three sons face the challenges presented by his sudden death?

== Episodes ==
=== 2017 ===
==== September ====
Episode			Original Air Date	Social Media hashtag	Synopsis	Kantar Media Nationwide Rating
#	Title		Original Air Date	Social Media hashtag	Synopsis	Kantar Media Nationwide Rating
1	"The Birthday"	Ang Kaawaran	September 25, 2017	#TGSTheBirthday	Despite their unhappy marriage, Victor chooses to stay with his wife Olivia for the sake of their sons, Enzo and Calvin. Unknown to Enzo and Calvin, their father hides another son named Joseph, Victor's illegitimate child with a woman named Racquel. Joseph grows up to be a kind and loving son even without a father. On his 40th birthday, Victor comes up with a drastic decision to leave Olivia and to make up for his lost time with Joseph. However, a tragic event suddenly unfolds, leaving Victor's loved ones devastated. Olivia and Racquel, along with their sons, grieve over Victor's death. Filled with regrets for failing to fix their relationship, Olivia recalls the first time Victor left her after a quarrel. During the time he left Olivia, Victor meets Racquel and develops feelings for her. Racquel soon conceives a child, only to learn that she got into a relationship with a married man. Meanwhile, Olivia resolves to uncover the identity of Victor's mistress to keep the latter away from her family. Anthony hopes to have the strength to fulfill his promise to Victor. He then gathers Victor's loved ones, including Racquel and Joseph, as he reads his brother's last will. After finding out that Victor left his illegitimate child an inheritance, Olivia and her sons are devastated, especially Enzo who worked hard to gain his father's attention. Hurt by the insults from Victor's legal family, Racquel and Joseph resolve to waive their rights to the inheritance. Later, Anthony gets an update about the autopsy he requested for Victor. Matilda and Olivia concoct a plan against Victor's other family. Later, a group of men startles Racquel's household as they force them to leave Victor's house. Not yet fully recovered from their ordeal, Racquel is caught off guard by Olivia's accusation of killing the Buenavidez patriarch. The authorities, however, refuse to apprehend Joseph's mother due to lack of substantial evidence. Soon, as the investigation begins, everyone becomes the primary suspect in Victor's murder.	18.1%
2	"Ang Mga Nakaraan	The Past	September 26, 2017	#TGSAngMgaNakaraan		17.7%
3	"Father and Son	Ama at Anak	September 27, 2017	#TGSFatherandSon		17.2%
4	"Unang Paghaharap	First Confrontation	September 28, 2017	#TGSUnangPaghaharap		17.6%
5	"The Suspects	Ang Mga Suspek	September 29, 2017	#TGSTheSuspects		17.8%

==== October ====
Episode			Original Air Date	Social Media hashtag	Synopsis	Kantar Media Nationwide Rating
#	Title		Original Air Date	Social Media hashtag	Synopsis	Kantar Media Nationwide Rating
6	"Kulong"	Locked Up	October 2, 2017	#TGSKulong	Matilda's plan to avenge for Olivia brings shame to the Reyeses. Joseph then confronts Olivia, but he ends up behind bars. There, an inevitable interrogation linking to Victor's demise reopens Joseph's old wounds. After his brief confinement, Joseph decides to go against the Buenavidezes. The Reyeses begin a new chapter in their lives as Joseph transfers to Brisard University and as Raquel assumes the daunting task of being Buenavidez Rice Company's newest board member. On his first day of school, Joseph tries his best not to get involved in any conflict with Enzo. Enzo, however, is out to make things complicated for Joseph. Raquel gets into another altercation with Olivia. Meanwhile, SPO1 Colmenares and his investigation team consider everyone in Victor's life as suspects. While Olivia insists her family's innocence, a revelation from someone within her circle sparks new speculations on the murder case. Meanwhile, an opportunity awaits Joseph as he gets the chance to show off his talent in basketball. Joseph decides to have a fresh start in the university by setting aside his differences with Enzo. Enzo, however, continues to give his father's illegitimate child the cold shoulder. Later, Joseph tries his best to persuade his other half-brother, Calvin, to work with him in his search for truth behind Victor's demise. The Reyeses and the Buenavidezes come face-to-face as they commemorate the 40th day since Victor's passing. In order to divert SPO1 Colmenares' investigation on her daughter, Matilda orders her private investigator to speed up his background check on Raquel. Meanwhile, Raquel deems it necessary to keep mum about Obet's real father. Soon, an unfortunate event befalls the Reyeses.	19.1%
7	"New Beginning"	Bagong Simula	October 3, 2017	#TGSNewBeginning		19.5%
8	"Interrogation"	Interogasyon	October 4, 2017	#TGSInterrogation		19.3%
9	"Reach Out"	Tumulong Sa	October 5, 2017	#TGSReachOut		17.3%
10	"40 Days"	Apatnapung Araw	October 6, 2017	#TGS40Days		17.9%
11	"Pagsubok"	Trial	October 9, 2017	#TGSPagsubok	Problems lay much deeper for the Reyeses and the Buenavidezes as they face unexpected setbacks in their lives. While Matias is taken to the hospital after losing consciousness, an unforeseen circumstance strikes the Buenavidezes once again. Anthony, on the other hand, finds himself caught in the middle as he does his best to attend to Victor's two families. Meanwhile, Obet's fate draws him closer to someone who will bring sunshine into his days. Meanwhile, the Buenavidez Rice Company faces a brewing crisis as Olivia makes a huge decision for her family's business. Matilda, however, has another plan in mind to keep the company afloat from its ongoing woes. Elsewhere, SPO1 Colmenares comes across a piece of information that might take a turn in the investigation on Victor's murder case. Joseph gets involved in another accusation. SPO1 Colmenares forces Raquel to revisit her harrowing past as he carries on with his investigation. Because of this, the Reyeses are left wondering on who is trying to damage their reputation. To make things worse, Joseph earns the public ire after being involved in an allegation. A surprising ally, however, comes to his aid to clear his name. Following the incident involving some of the Blue Jaguar players, the Brisard University's basketball coach makes an unsettling decision. As a result, Joseph gets the chance to redeem himself in his first basketball game with the team. Enzo, on the other hand, is left with no choice but to cooperate with his half-brother. A person from Raquel's past is all set for his return. Although the Blue Jaguars won the game, Enzo fails to contain his ire towards Joseph. Anthony feels dejected for failing to get Enzo and Joseph in good terms. Meanwhile, Raquel asserts her innocence against SPO1 Colmenares' accusation.	17.5%
12	"Bintang"	Suspicion	October 10, 2017	#TGSBintang		16.1%
13	"Desperado"	Desperate	October 11, 2017	#TGSDesperado		17.4%
14	"Supalpal"	Mouth Drop	October 12, 2017	#TGSSupalpal		16.5%
15	"Lagot Ka, Raquel!"	You're in Trouble, Raquel!	October 13, 2017	#TGSLagotKaRaquel		16.3%
16	"Bulilyaso"	Unsuccessful	October 16, 2017	#TGSBulilyaso	After hearing Raquel's side of the story, SPO1 Colmenares comes to a just decision. The verdict, however, does not sit well with Olivia who becomes frustrated by the turn of events. Furious, Olivia resorts to a blame game as she pours out her resentments toward Victor. Raquel, on the other hand, tries her best to shrug off criticisms surrounding her. Eventually, a new information leads the investigating team to her distant past. Anthony accompanies Raquel to San Leonardo to resolve the issues of the company with the farmers. The two receive an icy reception, but Raquel is unfazed and initiates a peaceful dialogue with the distressed farmers. An unfortunate event, however, leads Raquel and Anthony to get to know more about each other. As she arrives home, Raquel receives an unexpected call from a person in her past. A new information leads SPO1 Colmenares and his team to another visit to the Reyeses. There, they interrogate Raquel about Obet's father, Arthur. Confused about the latest development in Victor's murder case, Joseph and Obet demand the truth from Raquel. Meanwhile, Anthony makes a way to help Enzo, Cal, and Joseph patch up their differences. Anthony's effort, however, fails to sit well with Enzo. Obet is at breaking point after learning that Raquel has been lying to him about his father. Joseph runs to Obet's side and talks him into understanding Raquel's reasons. Soon, Raquel finally musters up her courage to tell Obet everything about Arthur. Upon paying Arthur a visit, Olivia coerces him to connive with her against Raquel. Meanwhile, Hazel decides to meet up with the mysterious guy she had been exchanging letters with. Finally, Sabina sympathizes with Obet's situation after crossing paths with him again.	17.1%
17	"Tawag"	Call	October 17, 2017	#TGSTawag		17.2%
18	"Bonding"	Pagsasama-sama	October 18, 2017	#TGSBonding		15.9%
19	"Koneksyon"	Connection	October 19, 2017	#TGSKoneksyon		16.3%
20	"Suhol"	Bribe	October 20, 2017	#TGSSuhol		15%
21	"Banta"	Threats	October 23, 2017	#TGSBanta	Arthur tries to manipulate Olivia's situation to his own advantage. Obet and Raquel finally patch up their differences. Not long after, their wounds reopen when Raquel is forced to confront her past. After finding himself in trouble, Enzo gets an unlikely ally. After a violent incident that struck Enzo and Joseph, the half-brothers are immediately rushed to the hospital. There, a new chaos breaks out between the Buenavidezes and the Reyeses. Soon, Olivia grows concern of Enzo and demands him to tell the absolute truth. Enzo, however, keeps mum about what happened and entreats his mother not to file any legal complaints on the matter. Eventually, the news about Enzo's brawl reaches SPO1 Colmenares. The recent brawling incident involving Enzo has made SPO1 Colmenares waste no time in interrogating the former. Enzo, however, does his best to brush off the allegations. Meanwhile, Joseph tails Enzo.The police officer, however, remains adamant in pursuing a background check on Enzo. Soon, SPO1 Colmenares finds a suspicious information about the young Buenavidez. Meanwhile, Joseph reacts harshly to Enzo's strange demeanor. Elsewhere, Obet begins his quest in looking for his estranged father, Arthur. After hearing Obet's ill-feelings, Raquel obliges to her son's request. With this, Obet finally gets the chance to meet the person he has been longing for.	16.1%
22	"Bugbog"	Bruises	October 24, 2017	#TGSBugbog		17.7%
23	"Sundan"	Alert	October 25, 2017	#TGSSundan		15.6%
24	"Paratang"	Alert	October 26, 2017	#TGSParatang		17%
25	"Unang Pagkikita"	First Meeting	October 27, 2017	#TGSUnangPagkikita		13.3%
26	"Galit"	Mad	October 30, 2017	#TGSGalit	Joseph delves into the information at hand and soon discovers Enzo and Trey's broken friendship. Thinking that Trey holds the key to Enzo's secret, Joseph comes to a decision of approaching Enzo's estranged friend. Joseph, eventually, proves that his intuition is true when Trey makes a shocking revelation. Meanwhile, SPO1 Colmenares suspects that someone is out to stop him from investigating Victor's demise. Despite Enzo's efforts to bury the memory of his tattered friendship with Trey, his harrowing past catches up to him. Soon, Anthony discovers Enzo's well-kept secret, forcing the latter to demand the truth from his nephew. Meanwhile, Cal introduces Justine to Olivia. Later, the Buenavidezes receive unwelcome guests in their mansion. Obet receives a shower of blessings.	17.7%
27	"Sumbong"	Complaint	October 31, 2017	#TGSSumbong		19.1%

==== November ====
Episode			Original Air Date	Social Media hashtag	Synopsis	Kantar Media Nationwide Rating
#	Title		Original Air Date	Social Media hashtag	Synopsis	Kantar Media Nationwide Rating
28	"Bumaligtad"	Reverse	November 1, 2017	#TGSBumaligtad	Joseph, soon, becomes upset as the interrogation with Trey turns out differently than he expected. Unknown to Joseph, Olivia manages to pull some strings to cover up Enzo's dark secrets. Joseph begins to see the good side of Enzo after having a heartfelt conversation with his half-brother. Wanting to end the tension between their respective families, Joseph offers Enzo to go hand in hand in seeking justice for Victor. Meanwhile, Olivia and SPO1 Colmenares find each other wrestling with contending desires. While the authorities are determined to dig up the truth behind the murder case, Olivia, on the other hand, is out to protect her sons from getting involved in the investigation. With an ulterior motive, Enzo tries to get on Joseph's good side. Joseph discovers the mysterious girl he had been exchanging letter with. However, their first meeting did not go well. Later, the Buenavidezes and Reyeses prepare for the company party.	17.5%
29	"Balikan"	Return	November 2, 2017	#TGSBalikan		17.5%
30	"Balatkayo"	Disguise	November 3, 2017	#TGSBalatkayo		18.6%
31	"Dukot"	Pull	November 6, 2017	#TGSDukot	The lives of Enzo and Joseph were in jeopardy after they were abducted by Toto's henchmen. Meanwhile, at the party, Raquel defends Obet and Joseph from Olivia when she accused Obet of slacking off instead of working. Olivia and Raquel were appalled when they found out that Matilda had a connection to the kidnapping of Joseph and Enzo because of her gambling addiction. Raquel and Olivia express their resentment over the abduction of Enzo and Joseph. Olivia apologizes to Enzo for failing to protect him while Raquel advises Joseph to refrain from hanging out with Enzo. Joseph calls the police after seeing one of his kidnappers entering a casino.	20.2%
32	"Ransom"	Agawin	November 7, 2017	#TGSRansom		21%
33	"Sikreto"	Secret	November 8, 2017	#TGSSikreto		20.8%
34	"Pruweba"	Proof	November 9, 2017	#TGSPruweba		17.4%
35	"Sabwatan"	Conveyance	November 10, 2017	#TGSSabatawan		18.2%
36	"Lason"	Poison	November 13, 2017	#TGSPoison	Joseph goes through great lengths to chase his and Enzo's abductors. His efforts finally pay off as Toto's henchman falls in the hands of SPO1 Colmenares. Following the arrest of the henchman, the authorities conduct a thorough search at the Buenavidezes’ residence. After failing to gather enough evidence against Matilda, SPO1 Colmenares shifts his focus to another suspect. Unknown to the officer, Dado has found a way to veer his investigation away from the old woman. An altercation erupts between Joseph and Enzo regarding the former's continuous interference in Victor's case. Joseph then proceeds to the Buenavidezes’ residence in hopes of reconciling with his half-brother. There, he witnesses a shocking moment between Dado and Olivia. Meanwhile, Anthony discovers another anomaly in the Buenavidez Rice Company. Obet reveals to Racquel the reason he works hard to earn money, prompting the latter to make a shocking revelation about Arthur. Disheartened, Obet musters up the courage to face his father. Armed by Joseph's statement, SPO1 Colmenares talks to Dado. Later, Joseph receives a threat from an anonymous person. SPO1 Colmenares' unexpected visit to the Castillos' residence paves way for Hazel to discover Dado's alleged affair with Olivia. Through Enzo, Hazel finds out who made this accusation against her father. This prompts the young lady to confront Joseph. Meanwhile, another intense argument sparks between Olivia and Raquel. Elsewhere, SPO1 Colmenares and PO1 Narciso try their best to find evidence that can support Joseph's claim against Dado and Olivia. The Buenavidezes face another problem as rumors spread about Olivia's alleged affair with Dado.	18.9%
37	"Relasyon"	Relation	November 14, 2017	#TGSRelasyon		18.2%
38	"Binenta"	Sold	November 15, 2017	#TGSBinenta		19.4%
39	"Kaaway"	Enemy	November 16, 2017	#TGSKaaway		17.8%
40	"Pagtatago"	Hidden	November 17, 2017	#TGSPagtatago		18.8%
41	"Binantaan"	Threatened	November 20, 2017	#TGSBinantaan	Determined to save Olivia from further scrutiny, Enzo thinks of a way to downplay the rumors surrounding her mother and Dado. Later, he gets into another argument with Joseph regarding the school fair. Upon learning about Anthony and Raquel's closeness, Olivia devises a plan to shift everyone's attention away from her. Meanwhile, Anthony squeezes the truth out of Randy about BDG's missing funds. Elsewhere, SPO1 Colmenares finds a lead that intensifies his suspicion about Olivia and Dado's affair.	17.8%
42	"Sisante"	Fired	November 21, 2017	#TGSSisante	SPO1 Colmenares goes through great lengths to confirm his suspicion about Dado and Olivia. After talking to Dado, SPO1 Colmenares finds a puzzling angle out of the former's statement. Armed by her newest discovery, Raquel confronts Olivia about BDG's missing funds. Meanwhile, Matilda fires Dado to stop the rumors about him and Olivia. Elsewhere, Emma finds something suspicious on Dado's phone.	17.5%
43	"Walang Takot"	Not Afraid	November 22, 2017	#TGSWalangTakot	Hazel learns why Emma is still sticking with Dado despite his obvious feelings for Olivia. With Anthony and Raquel drawing closer in uncovering her misconduct, Olivia resorts to a different plan. SPO1 Colmenares, on the other hand, continues to stalk Olivia and Dado in hopes of finding out more about their alleged affair. Meanwhile, Sabina discovers Obet's secret. Later, an argument erupts between Enzo and Joseph at the school fair.	18.6%
44	"Napahiya"	Humiliation	November 23, 2017	#TGSNapahiya	Hazel unexpectedly picks Joseph as her date for Brisard University's school fair. Left with no choice, Hazel and Joseph try to get along with each other. However, their date turns into a fiasco because of a careless conversation. Meanwhile, Obet and Raquel receive bad news about Arthur. Bothered by her conscience, Sabina tries to make amends with Obet after hurting his feelings.	19.2%
45	"Pananakot"	Intimidation	November 24, 2017	#TGSPananakot	After hearing the news that Arthur was stabbed in prison, Obet and Raquel pay him a visit. There, Arthur apologizes for his shortcomings and tries to fix his broken relationships with Raquel and their son. Meanwhile, Olivia thinks of a way to divert the authorities’ attention from her. Elsewhere, Enzo dares Joseph to prove his mother's affair with Dado.	19%
46	"Huling Huli"	Caught in the Act!	November 27, 2017	#TGSHulingHuli	Joseph and Enzo emerge as unlikely partners as they try to investigate Olivia and Dado's alleged affair. Together with Hazel, the half-brothers encounter a misfortune that tested their patience. Despite this, Enzo and Joseph set aside their differences in hopes of uncovering the truth. Later, the trio finds a way to enter the hotel where Olivia and Dado are staying. There, Enzo witnesses a scene that might give him the confirmation he dreads. Meanwhile, Olivia puts on a false front to gain Raquel's trust.	19.9%
47	"Umaarte"	Acting	November 28, 2017	#TGSUmaarte	Olivia comes up with a brilliant idea to divert the police's investigation away from her and Dado. Later, she puts up a façade to support her scheme, then lays the blame on an innocent individual. Enraged by what he witnessed between his mother and Dado, Enzo inadvertently puts Hazel's life in danger. Puzzled by Enzo's actions, Joseph presses his half-brother to reveal the reason behind his sudden change of emotions.	18.6%
48	"Ipagtanggol"	Protect	November 29, 2017	#TGSIpagtanggol	Infuriated by what happened to Hazel, Dado loses his cool upon seeing Joseph in the hospital. Olivia then seizes the opportunity to accuse Joseph of threatening her. In a stunning turn of events, an unlikely ally comes to Joseph's defense. Meanwhile, Enzo learns about Dado's impact on his mother's life. Elsewhere, SPO1 Colmenares acquires a puzzling piece of information about Dado on the night Olivia claimed she received a threat.	20.7%
49	"Naglayas"	Run Away	November 30, 2017	#TGSNaglayas	Olivia finds herself on pins and needles after Enzo moved out of their house. Eager to ease his mother's worries, Cal vows to find his brother. SPO1 Colmenares arrives at a conclusion after examining the threats Olivia received. The investigator then questions Dado's presence in Olivia's hotel room the night she claimed receiving a threat. Meanwhile, Joseph pays Hazel a surprise visit.	19.6%

==== December ====
Episode			Original Air Date	Social Media hashtag	Synopsis	Kantar Media Nationwide Rating
#	Title		Original Air Date	Social Media hashtag	Synopsis	Kantar Media Nationwide Rating
50	"Happy Family"	Masayang Pamilya	December 1, 2017	#TGSHappyFamily	Feeling betrayed after discovering his mother's affair, Enzo runs away from home. However, he soon finds himself having no place to stay. Joseph, meanwhile, seizes the opportunity to reach out to his brother after sensing the latter's predicament. He then urges Enzo to come home with him and stay with his family. Elsewhere, Olivia and Cal worry for Enzo.	20.5%
51	"Sugod Bahay"	House Raid	December 4, 2017	#TGSSugodBahay	Not wanting to cause another conflict, Hazel distances herself from Joseph. As soon as Olivia learns where Enzo is, she storms the Reyeses’ residence to take her son back. Enzo, however, refuses to come with her. Eager to prove Olivia's innocence in Victor's murder, Enzo urges his mother to admit to the investigators her affair with Dado. Later, SPO1 Colmenares interrogates Joseph and Enzo about what transpired in Antipolo.	19.1%
52	"Duguan"	Bloody	December 5, 2017	#TGSDuguan	The life of SPO1 Colmenares is in danger after an incident happened as he was about to look at an important video. Hazel becomes concerned about Joseph after learning what happened to SPO1 Colmenares. Joseph calls the ambulance and hopes that SPO1 will be safe to continue the investigation.	21%
53	"Colmenares"	SPO1 Leandro Colmenares	December 6, 2017	#TGSColmenares	Joseph and Anthony pay SPO1 Colmenares a visit at the hospital. There, a commotion breaks out, which again endangers the police officer's life. After receiving a visit from PO1 Narciso and PO2 Torres, Emma confronts Dado about what transpired the other night. Meanwhile, Enzo decides to return home despite his resentment toward Olivia. Elsewhere, Arthur heads to Raquel's house as soon as he gets out of prison.	20.4%
54	"Bagong Laya"	Fresh Start	December 7, 2017	#TGSBagongLaya	Overjoyed by Arthur's release, Obet invites his father to stay with his family. Arthur, however, feels that he is not welcome in the Reyeses’ home. Meanwhile, Romeo takes over the Buenavidez murder case after transferring to his brother's station. Still perturbed by SPO1 Colmenares’ demise, Joseph suspects that the incident is connected with Victor's murder. Elsewhere, Olivia tries to reconcile with Enzo.	20.8%
55	"Bistado"	Secret Exposed	December 8, 2017	#TGSBistado	Beset with problems at home and in the company, Olivia decides to move her entire family abroad. When Dado finds out about Olivia's plans, he tries to stop her from leaving. Failing that, Dado takes drastic measures to convince Olivia to stay. Joseph, meanwhile, remains determined to seek justice for the deaths of SPO1 Colmenares and Victor. However, he soon discovers that his quest comes at the risk of his family's lives.	20.4%
56	"Natatago"	Hiding	December 11, 2017	#TGSNagtatago	Dado's past misdeeds are coming to light after the authorities unearth a piece of evidence against him. On the verge of being captured, Dado manages to run away from his pursuers. Dado's wife, Emma, now struggles with feelings of regret for turning him to the police. She is even forced to reveal the truth about Dado and Olivia's alleged relationship. Later on, Dado receives help from a long-time friend.	19.8%
57	"Lumaban"	Fight	December 12, 2017	#TGSLumaban	Now that the police are looking for Dado, Joseph hopes that Victor's murder will soon be resolved. Thinking that she and Olivia must help the police find Dado, Matilda storms the Castillos’ house and accuses Emma of hiding her husband. Hazel, on the other hand, receives backlash for being the daughter of a suspected murderer. Meanwhile, Romeo suspects that Dado has a connection with Olivia. The police officer later discovers that Dado had an accomplice when he attacked SPO1 Colmenares.	20%
58	"Kadugo"	Blood Relatives	December 13, 2017	#TGSKadugo	The police starts to eye Hazel as a person of interest after discovering that Dado had a kinsman for an accomplice. Suspecting that Olivia knows Dado's relatives, PO1 Narciso asks her for information. Dado is vexed upon hearing this and resolves to deal with it. Later, Romeo asks Hazel to undergo DNA test, causing much anxiety to Emma. Elsewhere, Obet is invited to audition for a commercial.	18%
59	"Bad Influence	Masamang Impluwensya	December 14, 2017	#TGSBadInfluence	Hazel gets the shock of her life when Emma reveals the truth about her identity to dispel the police’s suspicions against her. Even after learning that she is adopted, Hazel still feels grateful to Emma and Dado. She, however, cannot help but become curious about her real family. In the midst of her struggles, Joseph offers Hazel a shoulder to cry on. Meanwhile, Arthur gradually poisons Obet’s mind against the Reyeses.	19.2%
60	"Ibang Babae"	Another Woman	December 15, 2017	#TGSIbangBabae	Searching for the missing pieces of her identity, Hazel prepares to go to Bataan with Joseph. Though distraught, Emma fully supports her daughter's decision. When Olivia finds out about Hazel's plans, she immediately pulls some strings to prevent the young Castillo from finding the truth. Meanwhile, the authorities continue to dig deeper into Dado's past. Elsewhere, Dado observes his family and enemy from afar.	18.9%
61	"Tunay Na Ina"	The True Mother	December 18, 2017	#TGSTunayNaIna	Joseph accompanies Hazel to her real parents’ hometown. There, they find out that Hazel's biological mother has died. Though relieved to know how much her real mother loves her, Hazel regrets not having met the former personally. Hazel and Joseph also learn that Dado has another child. Meanwhile, during their investigation, the police officers discover about Dado's affair with another woman.	20.7%
62	"Nagkainitan"	Hot	December 19, 2017	#TGSNagkainitan	Anthony pays the Reyeses a visit to check on Joseph. He, however, gets into a fight with Arthur after intervening in the latter and the Reyeses’ argument. This later causes conflict between Joseph, who berated Arthur for causing trouble, and Obet, who believes that his family is ganging up on his father. Meanwhile, Dado cooks up a plan against Joseph. After learning that Dado has another child, the police officers become suspicious of Olivia.	19.4%
63	"Pagtatanong"	Questioning	December 20, 2017	#TGSPagtatanong	Still suspicious of Olivia, Joseph is anxious to find out who Dado's biological child is. Cal, meanwhile, breaks down upon witnessing Enzo pressure Olivia to reveal the truth. Later, Anthony resolves to find out who between Enzo and Cal is his real nephew.	19.3%
64	"Gumanti"	Retaliate	December 21, 2017	#TGSGumanti	Dado finds a way to get back at Joseph for putting him and Olivia in a predicament. Cal gets into a brawl over accusations of his involvement with Dado and Hazel. Being suspicious of Cal, Joseph follows the former, causing him to miss his meetup with Obet. When Joseph fails to show up after his commercial shoot, Obet decides to go home alone. Soon, he is attacked by a mysterious man.	20.3%
65	"Resulta"	Result	December 22, 2017	#TGSResulta	Obet sustains an unsightly scar on his face in the aftermath of the assault against him, rendering him unable to pursue his dreams. With no one to blame, Obet holds Joseph responsible for going back on his promise to meet him after his taping. The Reyeses try their best to prevent Obet from sinking into depression. In the meantime, Joseph suspects that Dado might have assaulted Obet to get back at him. Meanwhile, Anthony makes a shocking discovery of Olivia's betrayal against Victor.	19.7%
66	"Ama"	Father	December 25, 2017	#TGSAma	Still unable to accept his situation, Obet refuses to be comforted by his family. He only cheers up when Sabina pays him a visit and brings him a well-wishing gift from his coworkers. Certain that he carried out his plan well, Dado reassures Olivia that their secret will not be revealed. Meanwhile, Anthony is torn between revealing his discovery or remaining silent to protect his loved ones.	17.9%
67	"Justine"	Justine Asuncion	December 26, 2017	#TGSJustine	Obet fails to control his temper as he continues to harbor resentment over his plight. Though worried about his brother, Joseph remains hopeful that Obet will get through his ordeal. Meanwhile, bothered by his family's secret, Anthony urges Cal to take the DNA test. This perturbs Cal, who then seeks solace from Justine. However, Cal becomes even more agitated when Enzo uncovers the truth about his friend.	19.7%
68	"Schizo"	Schizophrenia	December 27, 2017	#TGSSchizo	Surmising that Olivia has known all along about Cal's mental condition, Enzo pressures his mother to tell him the truth about his brother's health. Though reluctant, Olivia reveals to Enzo how she discovered that Cal has schizophrenia. She then asks Enzo to help her protect Cal and their family.	19.4%
69	"Kasabwat"	Conspirator	December 28, 2017	#TGSKasbwat	Olivia does her best to help Cal manage his condition, promising him that she will always stay by his side. Meanwhile, Joseph remains resolute in uncovering the truth about his father's death. This leads him to a revelation about Cal's identity. Later, Enzo confronts Cal about the latter's possible involvement in Victor's murder.	19.9%
70	"Aminin"	Confess	December 29, 2017	#TGSAminin	Cal is bowled over by Enzo's furious onslaught of accusations. Convinced that his brother plans to report him to the authorities, Cal runs away. Upon learning of Cal's disappearance, Enzo immediately heads out to search for his brother. He reaches out to his contacts, one of which being Anthony.	21.7%

=== 2018 ===
==== January ====
Episode			Original Air Date	Social Media hashtag	Synopsis	Kantar Media Nationwide Rating
#	Title		Original Air Date	Social Media hashtag	Synopsis	Kantar Media Nationwide Rating
71	"Imbitado"	Invitation	January 1, 2018	#TGSImbitado	Enzo faces a daunting choice between protecting his family's reputation and doing the right thing. Upon realizing that Calvin needs his full support and understanding, Enzo resolves to cover up the truth for his brother's sake. He then tries to make amends with Cal, but the latter continues to give him a cold shoulder. Meanwhile, Joseph helps Obet reach out to Sabina. The Reyeses and the Buenavidezes set aside their respective problems to celebrate Christmas.	16.8%
72	"Proteksyon"	Protection	January 2, 2018	#TGSProteksyon	Still discontented with the Buenavidezes' statements, Romeo and his subordinates ask Joseph for an interrogation. Joseph tells everything he knows, including his observation on Cal's sudden change of behavior. This then leads the police to set out another investigation to confirm Cal's alibi on the night of SPO1 Colmenares' assault. Meanwhile, Arthur devises a plan to help Obet see Sabina. Elsewhere, Joseph makes an eye-opening discovery about Cal.	17.7%
73	"Magpanggap"	Acting	January 3, 2018	#TGSMagpanggap	Arthur and Obet meet Ernesto's wrath upon managing to sneak into the latter's home to see Sabina. Worried that Arthur might lead Obet astray, Raquel then compels to make a startling decision. Arthur, on the other hand, remains resolute to win back his estranged wife's heart. Meanwhile, Romeo and his team obtain more information about Dado's alleged son. Elsewhere, Enzo finally meets Justine.	19.6%
74	"Palabas"	Stunt	January 4, 2018	#TGSPalabas	After gaining pieces of information about Dado's alleged son, the authorities' suspicion of Cal's involvement in SPO1 Colmenares' death intensifies. To prove his innocence, Cal agrees to undergo an interrogation and give testimonies to the police. Much to Cal's surprise, an unlikely ally comes to his aid to solidify his statements. Later, Olivia surmises that someone within her circle has a hand in the police's investigation on Cal. Meanwhile, Arthur asserts to Raquel his rights as Obet's father.	18.9%
75	"Pasabog"	Destroy	January 5, 2018	#TGSPasabog	Despite coming into the company New Year celebration in peace, Olivia still finds ways to take jabs at the Reyeses. Another quarrel ensues as Ernesto catches Obet together with his daughter, Sabina. Fuming and feeling disrespected, the Reyeses threaten to leave the event. Much to everyone's shock, a tragedy occurs in the middle of the celebration. Unbeknownst to Raquel, another plan is being orchestrated at her family's expense.	19.2%
76	"Plinanta"	Planted	January 8, 2018	#TGSPlinanta	After the tragic event that befell Olivia, the Buenavidezes are left pondering on the mystery behind her condition. Soon, the elite family learns that Olivia has been poisoned. Upon regaining consciousness, Olivia immediately releases statements, incriminating one of the Reyeses to her misfortune. SPO1 Alfonso and his subordinates then act to prove Olivia's claims. Not long after, the authorities uncover a piece of evidence that might derail their double investigation on Victor's and SPO1 Colmenares' demise.	19.7%
77	"Suspinde"	Suspended	January 9, 2018	#TGSSuspinde	Joseph is granted temporary release from jail after being accused of poisoning Olivia. The news of Joseph's release, however, does not sit well with Enzo. Not wanting to make things worse for her son, Raquel urges Joseph to keep his hands off the probe. Anthony, meanwhile, forces Olivia to tell the truth behind her mishap. Infuriated, Olivia threatens to expose her brother-in-law's well-kept secret.	18.8%
78	"Problemado"	Problems	January 10, 2018	#TGSProblemado	Intimidated by Olivia's threats, Anthony finds himself in an upsetting situation. Raquel then offers to be his sounding board. Thereafter, Raquel gets more than she bargained for after discovering Anthony's secret. Adding to Raquel's misery, Joseph informs her about his suspension from school. Meanwhile, Obet begins to have a sudden change of heart toward Joseph after a person dear to him bids goodbye.	17.9%
79	"Kilalanin"	Identify	January 11, 2018	#TGSKilalanin	Obet musters up his courage to finally reveal to the authorities the information he holds regarding Joseph's case. Romeo and his subordinates then begin to consider Obet's testimonies and look at the crime in a different light. With the investigation still in motion, the Reyeses compel Joseph not to take matters into his own hands. Meanwhile, Olivia wants Dado to slow down with their plans. Elsewhere, Cal gets to know more about Tinay.	19.2%
80	"Natunton"	Track and Follow	January 12, 2018	#TGSNatunton	On her return, Olivia remains relentless in accusing the Reyeses of poisoning her. Afterwards, she makes a huge decision which schocks the entire board of directors. Sensing that the Buenavidez Rice Company president is trying to spare herself from trouble, Raquel drops a bombshell concerning the company's impending collapse. Despite being polar opposites, Cal and Tinay's relationship, meanwhile, gets closer. On the other hand, Sabina defies her father.	19.6%
81	"Ama at Anak"	Father and Son	January 15, 2018	#TGSAmaAtAnak	The authorities' suspicion on Olivia and Dado's connivance intensifies after finding the latter in one of the Buenavidezes' properties. Wanting to prove their theory, Romeo and his deputy question Olivia if she has been aiding her former driver. Despite convincing the police with her airtight alibi, Olivia decides to cut ties with Dado. Unbeknownst to Olivia, Dado seeks Cal's help. Elsewhere, Hazel starts looking for Dado.	18.8%
82	"Selebrasyon	Raquel's Birthday Celebration	January 16, 2018	#TGSSelebrasyon	After hearing Cal and Olivia's conversation regarding Dado, Enzo demands his mother to tell the truth. Enzo then learns of another dark secret lurking in their family. Seeing Joseph as the thorn in his side, Dado devises a plan to get him completely out of his way. Dado soon rushes to the Reyeses who are in the middle of Raquel's birthday party. Meanwhile, Hazel grows skeptical of Cal and Justine's friendship.	17.2%
83	"Panganib"	Danger	January 17, 2018	#TGSPanganib	Dado's personal vendetta against the Reyeses puts Raquel's life in danger. His vengeance suddenly backfires as he engages in a brawl with Anthony. Facing another ordeal in their family, Obet puts the blame on Joseph. Upon learning of the tragic event, Olivia decides to make Dado her sacrificial lamb. Meanwhile, Cal wants Dado to disappear together with his dark secrets.	19.5%
84	"Huli Ka!"	Caught You!	January 18, 2018	#TGSHuliKa	Hoping to put an end to her anxiety, Olivia anonymously gives the police information about Dado's hideout. The authorities eventually confirm the tip as they catch hold of the notorious suspect. At the police station, Dado takes full responsibility for all the crimes he allegedly committed. Joseph then finds this opportunity to unleash his anger toward his family's assailant. Meanwhile, Emma and Olivia come to blows over who pushed Dado to go to the extremes.	20.2%
85	"Blackmail"		January 19, 2018	#TGSBlackmail	Following Dado's confession, Cal fears that his biological father will throw him under the bus. Olivia then brushes off his worry by reminding them of their immediate trip abroad. As the Buenavidez matriarch itches to get out of trouble, Joseph, on the other hand, is determined to prevent their departure. The authorities, meanwhile, are skeptical of Dado's guilt. Finally, Raquel regains consciousness.	18.9%
86	"Pahihirapan"	Pain	January 22, 2018	#TGSPahihirapan	Seeing himself at a crossroads in his quest for justice, Joseph seeks Victor's guidance. He soon makes up his mind after Hazel shares a plan with him. Meanwhile, Arthur pays Dado a surprising visit in prison. Unbeknownst to Dado, Arthur has something up his sleeves. Anthony finally professes his love to Raquel.	19.8%
87	"Pagtakas"	Escaped	January 23, 2018	#TGSPagtakas	Just when Olivia thought the stars have finally aligned for her and her family, an unexpected turn of events suddenly dims her bright escape plan. Anthony, being the harbinger of bad news, informs her that the company has filed embezzlement charges against her. Soon after, Olivia's conspirator reappears and threatens to expose her dark secrets. Meanwhile, Obet and Arthur are disheartened by Raquel's stunning revelation. Joseph meets Victor in his dream.	20.2%
88	"Boses"	Voices	January 24, 2018	#TGSBoses	Much to Olivia's dismay, Mr. Villamanca drops the bomb regarding her involvement in the anomalies in the company. Amid harsh allegations, Olivia asserts her innocence, while his sons try to cope with the derailment of their plan to start afresh. Seeing Anthony as a threat to his desire of having a complete family, Obet urges Joseph to intervene. Raquel, on the other hand, is compelled to reconsider her priorities. Anxiety puts Cal on the edge as he begins to hear a strange voice inside his head.	20%
89	"Ninakawan"	Robbery	January 25, 2018	#TGSNinakawan	Another tension at Brisard University broke out with Joseph's return, while Olivia's world collapsed on his discovery.	20%
90	"Paglilitis"	Trial	January 26, 2018	#TGSPaglilitis	Olivia gets the biggest shock of her life after discovering that her funds from her personal bank account are missing. Surmising that Anthony is responsible for the deficit, Olivia threatens to expose his unlawful acts. Unperturbed, Anthony exerts his effort in feeding his insatiable appetite for truth. Meanwhile, Joseph gets into an outright brawl with Enzo on his return to Brisard University. Raquel has finally made it clear what her heart truly desires.	18.6%
91	"Umamin"	Confess	January 29, 2018	#TGSUmamin	Consumed by her frustration, Olivia throws a fit of rage at the thought of Anthony putting her plans in vain. To make things worse, Enzo learns another of Olivia's twisted truth after witnessing her outburst. Thinking that her son might go astray with what he discovered, Olivia explains her side of the story. Meanwhile, Joseph and Hazel fail to find a concrete evidence that would solidify their suspicion on Cal. While the two resolve into shifting the track of their secret investigation, an impending danger looms over them.	20.1%
92	"Kinumpirma"	Confirmation	January 30, 2018	#TGSKinumpirma	Vowing to make her family her top priority, Raquel decides to keep her feelings for Anthony at bay. The distraught Anthony, on the other hand, still mulls over Raquel's earnest request. While Anthony has enough on his plate, the return of a significant person from his past is poised to make things more complicated. Meanwhile, Joseph and Hazel's secret investigation on Cal takes them to Justine. Pushed to the brink, Olivia concocts a plan to ensure Anthony's downfall.	19.2%
93	"Nagmamahalan"	Loving	January 31, 2018	#TGSNagmamahalan	Still perplexed by Justine's testimonies, Joseph and Hazel ask Cal their most pressing questions. Completely taken aback by his half-siblings' interrogation, Cal decides to make a bold move for his family, but someone dear to him attempts to intervene. In prison, Dado contacts Olivia and informs her of some important information he holds regarding Victor's murder case. Unbeknowsnt to Dado, a police officer discovers his secret alliance with Olivia. Meanwhile, Anthony and Raquel are unable to keep denying what they feel about each other any longer.	19.8%

==== February ====
Episode			Original Air Date	Social Media hashtag	Synopsis	Kantar Media Nationwide Rating
#	Title		Original Air Date	Social Media hashtag	Synopsis	Kantar Media Nationwide Rating
94	"Natakasan"	Dismissal	February 10, 2018	#TGSNatakasan	Wanting to start with a clean slate, Anthony speaks with the Reyeses regarding his blossoming relationship with Raquel. While Joseph and Matias willfully give the lawyer their blessings, rebellion brews deep inside Obet's mind. He then confides in Arthur about Anthony's admission, causing the two men to be at each other's throats. Meanwhile, Joseph and Hazel learn more information about Cal upon their return to Justine's neighborhood. Olivia goes to desperate lengths to help Cal recuperate from his mental unrest.	19.6%
95	"Lumalala"	Worsening	February 2, 2018	#TGSLumalala	After managing to outsmart the policemen, Olivia takes Cal to a psychiatrist away from the city. However, their sigh of relief suddenly shifts into worry upon learning about his worsening condition. Unfortunately for the Buenavidezes’, their problems continue to pile up as news of Joseph and Hazel's interrogation reaches them. This prompts Olivia to lash out. Despite feeling sympathy for his father's heartbreak, Obet, meanwhile, makes an eye-opening plea to Arthur. On the other hand, the rice company's stockholders issue a daunting threat to Ernesto and Anthony.	18.6%
96	"Inako"	Claim	February 5, 2018	#TGSInako	Cal becomes agitated upon learning that Joseph and Hazel interrogated Justine. Dado, on the other hand, does everything in his power to protect his son. Later, Joseph chances upon a possible angle in Victor's death after convincing Enzo to undergo DNA testing. He then wastes no time in informing the authorities about his recent discovery. Meanwhile, Anthony tries to reach out to Obet.	18.9%
97	"Talunan"	Defeated	February 6, 2018	#TGSTalunan	Obet is in hot water after he intentionally failed to show up at his and Anthony's meetup. While Raquel fails to hide her disappointment in her son, Arthur continues to poison Obet's mind against Joseph and Anthony. Cal, on the other hand, finds himself on pins and needles as Olivia is about to face the verdict on her estafa case. Later, Ernesto and Olivia hold their breaths as the court announces its decision. Meanwhile, Justine gets interrogated by the police regarding her earlier statement about Cal's alibi.	19%
98	"Nagsasaya"	Frolic	February 7, 2018	#TGSNagsasaya	After winning her estafa case, Olivia sets her sights on regaining her position at BDG and making Anthony's and Raquel's lives miserable. Amid the turmoil, Justine arrives at a difficult decision that leaves Cal devastated. SPO2 Alfonso, on the other hand, realizes that one person could be the key to SPO1 Colmenares’ case. Later, Romeo and PO1 Narciso pull out all the stops to verify Justine's statement about Cal's alibi. Meanwhile, Obet finds solace in Sabina as he gets haunted by his painful past. Elsewhere, Joseph and Hazel's budding romance is slowly becoming evident to the people around them.	17.5%
99	"Kabado"	Nervous	February 8, 2018	#TGSKabado	Cal's stunning discovery about Anthony's clandestine action triggers the former's paranoia. Olivia then capitalizes on the opportunity to turn her son against Anthony. Alarmed by what he discovered, Cal resolves to make a bold move in hopes of protecting his secret. Eager to help Arthur win back Raquel, Obet finds a way to help his father. Meanwhile, Romeo and PO2 Torres obtain vital information about Justine and Cal. Elsewhere, Matias gives Joseph a love advice.	19.6%
100	"Pagluhod"	Kneel	February 9, 2018	#TGSPagluhod	Calvin breaks inside Anthony's home to retrieve his DNA results. However, before Calvin could steal the documents, Anthony arrives with Joseph. Calvin then tries to escape but Joseph stops him. Soon, Anthony brings Calvin to the precinct, while Joseph files a complaint against his stepbrother. When Olivia learns about this, she desperately begs Joseph to take pity on Calvin.	20%
101	"Pagbawi"	Recover	February 12, 2018	#TGSPagbawi	Joseph faces a big dilemma after an incident occurred at the police station. Later, he arrives at a difficult decision regarding Cal's case. However, his decision does not sit well with Obet, who immediately shares his frustrations to Arthur and Sabina. Later, Romeo and PO1 Narciso manage to acquire a crucial piece of information after questioning Joseph about Cal's condition. Meanwhile, Matilda confronts Olivia about Cal's situation.	17.3%
102	"Pasalamat"	Thanks	February 13, 2018	#TGSPasalamat	The police officers then waste no time in questioning Dado, who gets alarmed after learning about Cal's recent incident. Later, Dado sees a window of opportunity to protect his son. Soon, Cal suffers another schizophrenic episode upon hearing startling news about his friend. Meanwhile, as Sabina struggles to live independently, she encounters an unfortunate incident. Elsewhere, Arthur expresses excitement as Obet organizes a date for him and Raquel.	17.9%
103	"Paglalahad"	Unfolding	February 14, 2018	#TGSPaglalahad	Despite Olivia's objection, Cal makes his way to the police station to help Justine. Wanting to keep his friend out of his family's predicament, Cal hurls a series of shocking revelations. Later, Obet's organized date for Arthur and Raquel turns into an absolute disaster. This prompts Matias to confront his daughter's former husband. Scorned, Arthur recalls an enticing offer from an unlikely ally.	19%
104	"Pagsisi"	Blaming	February 15, 2018	#TGSPagsisi	Olivia pulls out all the stops to prevent SPO2 Alfonso from detaining Cal. However, her plea falls on deaf ears. Seeing Cal in an unfavorable situation, Olivia blames Anthony for her son's plight. Obet, on the other hand, gloats over Cal's misfortunes. Armed with Cal's confession, PO1 Narciso and PO2 Torres try to interrogate Dado. Meanwhile, Arthur fumes upon receiving an unexpected court order.	20.2%
105	"Tumakas"	Escape	February 16, 2018	#TGSTumakas	Obet finally makes a decision to stay with Arthur. He then resolves to leave despite Joseph's and Raquel's appeals. Meanwhile, Dado seizes the opportunity to break out of jail. He then vows to seek retribution against the people who wronged him. Elsewhere, Enzo comforts his disturbed brother.	18.6%
106	"Yakap"	Cry	February 19, 2018	#TGSYakap	Olivia watches helplessly as Cal gets grilled in the courtroom. However, an unforeseen occurrence halts the trial. Amid trying times, an unexpected gesture leaves Olivia in tears. Joseph, on the other hand, gives Anthony and Hazel an update about Cal's hearing. Unbeknownst to him, a dangerous enemy is patiently waiting for the opportune time to strike. Meanwhile, Raquel tries to persuade Obet to return home.	19.7%
107	"Itinago"	Hide	February 20, 2018	#TGSItinago	Olivia's world-shattering revelation plunges Enzo into deep misery. Devastated by what he learned, Enzo drowns himself in alcohol. Meanwhile, Joseph expresses his desire to spend Valentine's Day with Hazel. Later, Obet receives a timely surprise from Sabina on Valentine's Day. However, their special day is cut short when an unexpected problem occurred. This leads to Joseph's stunning discovery.	21%
108	"Bugbugan"	Quarrel	February 21, 2018	#TGSBugbugan	Obet bristles with rage when Joseph discloses Sabina's whereabouts to the de Guzmans. Joseph's revelation later leads to a physical altercation between him and his half-brother. Being blamed for Obet's violent behavior, Arthur resolves to take the low road. Meanwhile, a psychiatrist tries to squeeze the truth out of Cal about his involvement in SPO1 Colmenares’ death. Cal then reveals the secret he has been protecting all along. Elsewhere, Anthony recalls one of his arguments with his late brother.	19.6%
109	"Traydor"	Traitor	February 22, 2018	#TGSTraydor	Plagued with guilt, Cal apologizes to Enzo for all the pain he caused him. Later, Anthony pays Cal a visit and learns about his step-nephew's involvement in Victor's death. He then shares the daunting news to Joseph. Olivia, on the other hand, finally finds Mr. Villamanca and demands him to return the money. Upon failing to get what she wanted, Olivia wastes no time to search for Villamanca's accomplice. Meanwhile, Obet musters up the courage to face Ernesto in hopes of reuniting with Sabina.	18.2%
110	"Sugod"	Dash	February 23, 2018	#TGSSugod	Olivia accuses Anthony of stealing the company's money. Later, Anthony and Raquel face difficulties with their relationship, making things worse for him. With this, Anthony starts to blame his brother for his misfortunes. Elsewhere, Obet is determined to fix his relationship with Sabina. However, their relationship becomes more complicated because of Enzo.	18.4%
111	"Hiwalay"	Separated	February 26, 2018	#TGSHiwalay	Raquel endures the emotional pain of her breakup with Anthony. Anthony, on the other hand, recalls his painful memories of Victor upon seeing a memento. Later, the Buenavidezes fail to control their emotions as Cal submits to psychiatric rehabilitation. Determined to help her son, Olivia meets with Dado. In a shocking turn of events, Dado makes a stunning revelation about Cal that gives Olivia renewed hope.	19.6%
112	"Pagtatalo"	Argument	February 27, 2018	#TGSPagtatalo	Armed with Dado's revelation, Olivia asks Cal to narrate the events the night Victor died. Determined to prevent Cal from going behind bars, Olivia insists her son's innocence to the authorities. Later, SPO2 Alfonso and PO1 Narciso stumble upon a potential lead in Victor's case. This prompts the police officials to interrogate Anthony. Meanwhile, a visitor brings happiness into Cal's complicated life.	17.2%
113	"Nawawala"	Missing	February 28, 2018	#TGSNawawala	Following Olivia's command, Arthur breaks into Anthony's house. Olivia then makes a shocking discovery about her brother-in-law upon obtaining the files Arthur acquired from the lawyer's abode. Later, Raquel's family learns that Anthony is considered a suspect in Victor's case. Things become even more complicated when the Buenavidezes learn about Anthony's sudden disappearance. Meanwhile, the incident in Anthony's house leaves a hanging question on the minds of the authorities.	19.2%

==== March ====
Episode			Original Air Date	Social Media hashtag	Synopsis	Kantar Media Nationwide Rating
#	Title		Original Air Date	Social Media hashtag	Synopsis	Kantar Media Nationwide Rating
114	"Kampihan"	Siding	March 1, 2018	#TGSKampihan	A scandalous problem arises due to Enzo's negligence. This leads to an altercation between him and Joseph. Ernesto's initiative to mend his ties with Sabina greatly affects the latter's relationship with Obet. Later, Obet projects his frustrations onto his half-brother. Meanwhile, Olivia gives Dado an arduous task.	16.3%
115	"Bangkay"	Found Dead	March 2, 2018	#TGSBangkay	Joseph becomes upset with Hazel after seeing her with Enzo. Frustrated, he finally admits his feelings for the young woman. Meanwhile, Joseph's and Enzo's families learn about the death of one of their relatives. Guilt-ridden, Raquel grieves and expresses her regret for her shortcomings. Olivia, elsewhere, gloats about the person's demise.	19.9%
116	"Sadness"		March 5, 2018	#TGSSadness	Raquel still reels from shock over Anthony's untimely death. Later on, the Reyeses and the Buenavidezes come face-to-face as they pay their respects to the late lawyer. While Enzo and Calvin are very much grieving over the loss of their beloved uncle who has been like a father to them, Olivia feigns sympathy for her brother-in-law's death. Meanwhile, SPO3 Encarnacion takes charge of the Buenavidez murder case.	18.7%
117	"Inheritance"		March 6, 2018	#TGSInheritance	SPO3 Encarnacion leads his team in investigating Anthony's death. They interview Anthony's colleagues and learn about Arthur's rift with the late lawyer. Wanting to prove Calvin's innocence, Enzo pleads with Hazel to help him. Joseph, on the other hand, resolves to keep his distance from the two to avoid any more conflict. Meanwhile, Olivia learns that Joseph will get a share of Anthony's assets.	19.6%
118	"Steal"		March 7, 2018	#TGSSteal	SPO3 Encarnacion and his team release Arthur after failing to find evidence of his involvement in Anthony's death. They go back to the drawing board and begin eyeing the other persons of interest in the Buenavidez brothers’ murder cases. Soon, SPO3 Encarnacion uncovers a new lead. Meanwhile, Raquel struggles to keep Victor's company afloat. Olivia, on the other hand, tries to look for Anthony's missing assets.	17.8%
119	"New Suspect"		March 8, 2018	#TGSNewSuspect	Matias is taken in for questioning after SPO3 Encarnacion discovered that he followed Victor on the night of his death. Matias reveals that he threatened Victor to end his relationship with Raquel, but insists that he did not kill Victor. However, the police's suspicion against Matias intensifies when his dark past is uncovered. Meanwhile, Olivia shows up at the police station and causes a ruckus. She resolves to find solid evidence that will implicate Matias and the Reyeses in Victor's murder.	18%
120	"Admit"		March 9, 2018	#TGSAdmit	Certain that the Buenavidezes will file a case against Matias, Obet enlists Arthur's help. Enzo, on the other hand, tries to convince Hazel to help him find evidence against the Reyeses. When Hazel refuses, Enzo's desperation compels him to confront Matias face-to-face. Meanwhile, Olivia takes matters into her own hands as financial setbacks begin to hit her family. Elsewhere, Joseph discovers a man secretly investigating Matias.	17.2%
121	"Follow"		March 12, 2018	#TGSFollow	Olivia receives an update on Mr. Villamanca's whereabouts. She then enlists Dado's help to extract information about the company's missing funds. Meanwhile, Joseph surmises that Olivia is keeping a close watch over his family after learning of her persistent accusations against Matias. Determined to find out what Olivia has been up to, he decides to follow her. Joseph soon comes face-to-face with Dado.	17.4%
122	"Lies"		March 13, 2018	#TGSLies	Joseph informs the police about Olivia's meeting with Dado. Olivia, however, is firm in her denial to the authorities and to Enzo. Unknown to them, she later meets with Dado and agrees to his condition to get rid of their enemies. Later, Enzo visits Calvin at the institution and informs him of Joseph's continuous harassment of their mother. Meanwhile, several interested parties learn that Mr. Villamanca has been found.	16.8%
123	"Stay Away"		March 14, 2018	#TGSStayAway	Upon learning of Mr. Villamanca's whereabouts, Raquel, Ernesto, and Olivia immediately set out to find him. Raquel and Ernesto arrive first and come face-to-face with Mr. Villamanca, who later reveals to them Anthony's involvement in the company's missing funds. Olivia, however, only finds an empty house. Meanwhile, an enraged Calvin threatens Joseph to stop bothering Olivia. This prompts Joseph to confront Enzo about poisoning his brother's mind.	18.5%
124	"The Beach"		March 15, 2018	#TGSTheBeach	Worried that Enzo might steal Sabina from him, Obet decides to follow them to Batangas. He soon becomes enraged at the sight of the two together. During their leadership training activity, Enzo picks a fight with Joseph . They later get into serious trouble after Hazel went missing. Meanwhile, wanting to protect Olivia from Joseph, Calvin asks Tinay for a favor.	17.8%
125	"Real Killer"		March 16, 2018	#TGSRealKiller	Dado escapes from the scene of the crime after unintentionally harming Enzo. This pushes Olivia to turn her back on her former accomplice. Arthur, meanwhile, becomes more determined to get back at Dado for once again threatening Obet's life. Elsewhere, SPO3 Encarnacion orders Romeo to investigate the incident involving Dado and Enzo. Soon after, a shocking truth about Anthony's murderer surfaces.	19.1%
126	"Escape"		March 19, 2018	#TGSEscape	Dado, in his desperation, finds a way to be reunited with Olivia and Calvin. After causing a commotion in the psychiatric facility, he abducts Calvin. Dado then uses his son to stop Olivia from deserting him. The news eventually reaches Joseph, who refuses to be at ease until Dado is caught. Meanwhile, Raquel despairs over the company's dire financial situation.	19.6%
127	"Depart"		March 20, 2018	#TGSDepart	Worried for her son's safety, Olivia resolves to save Calvin at all costs. Upon her arrival at their designated meeting place, Dado gives her an ultimatum. Olivia's decision devastates Enzo, who is left with no choice but to shoulder his family's plight on his own. Meanwhile, Raquel remains resolute in saving the company. Her determination eventually bears fruit and paves the way for the company's recovery.	19.9%
128	"Fix"		March 21, 2018	#TGSFix	Joseph and Enzo start their internship at Buenavidez-de Guzman Corporation. Despite the unfortunate turn in his life, Enzo remains determined not to lose to the Reyeses. Raquel and her colleagues prepare for an event to celebrate the company's recovery. Meanwhile, Dado leads a simple life with Calvin and Olivia. While Calvin grows affectionate of his father, Olivia looks for a way to escape Dado.	19.4%
129	"Flee"		March 22, 2018	#TGSFlee	Raquel and Joseph work hard to prepare for the upcoming event. Enzo, on the other hand, is having difficulty fitting into the company. Before the celebration, Enzo and the Reyeses visit Victor's tomb to commemorate his death anniversary. Olivia and Calvin, still imprisoned in the island by Dado, commemorates the death anniversary of Victor alone. Soon after, Olivia executes her plan to get her and her son, Calvin, back to Manila. She sets the hut on fire, hoping Dado would perish with it. As they flee, Dado catches up with them.	17.8%
130	"Tragedy"		March 23, 2018	#TGSTragedy	With Dado on Olivia's tail, they flee to a Buenavidez-de-Guzman Corporation celebration, notifying Raquel and the others about Dado's incoming. He ruins a special night for Raquel and holds them hostage on the rooftop. Enzo and Joseph try to fight of Dado, hoping it would keep the others safe. As Raquel makes a run for it, she gets hit by Dado and hangs off on the side of the top of the building. Joseph holds on to her, but calls for Enzo to help. Enzo makes a decision to help his family instead, causing Raquel to lose her grip, falling to the ground. Calvin is still entrapped with Dado.	20.2%
131	"Revenge"		March 26, 2018	#TGSRevenge	Dado escapes from the authorities to be with his son Calvin. However, Calvin gets separated from him, giving the police a chance to corner him. Just as Dado is about to be arrested, an unexpected turn of events catches Calvin off guard. Olivia, on the other hand, stops at nothing to implicate Dado. Meanwhile, Raquel's tragic death leaves a void in the hearts of her loved ones.	22.1%
132	"Wake"		March 27, 2018	#TGSWake	The Reyeses and the people who care for Raquel mourn for her death. Obet and Joseph openly express their grief as they say goodbye to their mother. Filled with guilt, Enzo visits Raquel's wake to pay his respects. His appearance, however, infuriates Obet and Joseph. Olivia, meanwhile, has her mind set on finding Calvin and fulfilling her plans for her family.	20.6%
133	"Funeral"		March 28, 2018	#TGSFuneral	Raquel's family and colleagues pay their last respects to her. Still embittered by their mother's demise, Joseph and Obet stew in their anger. Soon, Obet concocts a dangerous plan to avenge Raquel's death. Meanwhile, Joseph finds Olivia visiting Raquel's tomb. This encounter provokes Joseph's anger toward her.	20.2%

==== April ====
Episode		Original Air Date	Social Media hashtag	Synopsis	Kantar Media Nationwide Rating
#	Title	Original Air Date	Social Media hashtag	Synopsis	Kantar Media Nationwide Rating
134	"Blood"	April 2, 2018	#TGSBlood	Determined to get back everything her family deserves, Olivia enlists Ernesto's help in reclaiming her position in the company. Joseph then lashes out on Olivia as he learns of her plan. Not wanting the Buenavidez matriarch to succeed, Obet does the unthinkable to Olivia. Upon learning of his mother's humiliation, Enzo confronts the Reyeses. Because of this, an awful incident befalls on another of the Reyeses.	19.0%
135	"Threat"	April 5, 2018	#TGSThreat	Matias tries to talk some sense into Obet after discovering that he is hiding a firearm. Obet, however, becomes even more determined to get back at the Buenavidezes. Meanwhile, Olivia receives a threat from a mysterious person. She tries to brush it off, only to learn later on that one of her loved ones is in peril. Upon finding out who is responsible for the attack, Olivia is determined to press charges against him.	20.4%
136	"Prison"	April 4, 2018	#TGSPrison	Obet is put behind bars after the Buenavidezes filed a complaint against him. However, the court dismisses his case for the lack of substantial evidence. Upon learning about what happened to Obet, Arthur resolves to reveal to the authorities what he knows about Olivia. Olivia soon finds herself refuting Arthur's accusations. Later on, the Buenavidezes are caught off guard after learning that both Enzo and Joseph received threats.	18.8%
137	"Search"	April 5, 2018	#TGSSearch	Due to her growing unrest, Olivia is set on finding Dado. She soon learns that Joseph and Hazel are also looking for the latter's father. Olivia then instructs her investigator to mislead the two teens and bring them into trouble. Because of this, Joseph arrives at an important decision regarding his relationship with Hazel. Meanwhile, Cal wakes up at a hospital.	19.3%
138	"Mastermind"	April 6, 2018	#TGSMastermind	Upon regaining consciousness, the distraught Cal leaves the hospital and calls Tinay. Tinay, perplexed by her friend's inexplicable allusions, turns to the Buenavidezes for help. Olivia eventually finds her missing son, but Cal opts to run away again. Unbeknownst to him, danger is just on the horizon. Meanwhile, Obet discovers Joseph's other side.	17.6%
139	"Found"	April 9, 2018	#TGSFound	Calvin holds a disturbing secret regarding Victor's death. He then becomes more determined to find his missing brother at all costs. Little did Enzo know, Joseph is hiding Cal in a safe refuge. Obet, meanwhile, prepares to strike back, fearing that his past actions might come to light. Elsewhere, a shocking news turns Olivia to become increasingly concerned for her family's safety.	20.5%
140	"Recorded"	April 10, 2018	#TGSRecorded	Determined to know what Joseph is up to, Obet tails his brother and discovers his secret. Enzo shows up not long after, and a violent confrontation ensues. A harrowing incident, however, paves the way for Obet and Joseph to reconcile and settle their differences. In order to protect his family, Enzo makes the ultimate sacrifice. Meanwhile, Dado is sent to his final resting place.	21%
141	"Truth"	April 11, 2018	#TGSTruth	The authorities deem it necessary to further cross-examine Enzo after he admitted to murdering Victor. Surprised by Enzo's move, Joseph tries to talk him out of it. The two half-brothers then come up with plan against the real culprit. Meanwhile, Olivia grows worried for Enzo after learning what he did. Soon, however, the Buenavidez matriarch gets the shock of her life after learning that her son turned against her.	22.2%
142	"Forgive"	April 12, 2018	#TGSForgive	Seeing that she could no longer convince Enzo to take her side, Olivia starts enacting her plan to escape from the country. Enzo realizes what his mother is up to and informs Joseph about it. Soon, the authorities waste no time in tracking down the Buenavidezes' whereabouts. As the truth about Victor's death slowly unravels, will Enzo and Joseph find it in their hearts to forgive each other?	22.1%
143	"Case Closed"	April 13, 2018	#TGSCaseClosed	Joseph begins to take stock of his life as his birthday approaches. Later, his family and friends prepare a surprise bash for him, which fills his heart with love and gladness. Unbeknownst to Joseph, Olivia is just lurking around. What is supposed to be a joyous celebration takes a tragic turn when the Buenavidez matriarch sets her nefarious plans into motion. Will Joseph still attain the ever-elusive justice for Victor's death?	24.5%
